= Ashti, Khed =

Village in Maharashtra

Ashti
- Village
- Location in Maharashtra, India Ashti (India)
- Coordinates: 17°38′13″N 73°23′4″E
- Country: India
- State: Maharashtra
- District: Ratnagiri
- Elevation: 12 m (39 ft)

Population (2010)
  - Total: 2,000

Languages
  - Official: Kokni & Marathi
- Time zone: UTC+5:30 (IST)
- PIN: 415709
- Telephone code: 02356
- Nearest city: Khed
- Lok Sabha constituency: Ratnagiri
- Vidhan Sabha constituency: Khed
- Climate: 28°-45°(Summer-Daytime) & 15°-30°(Winter-Daytime) (Köppen)

Ashti is a small village on the banks of the Jagbudi River in the region of the Western Ghats (also known as the Sahyadri mountains, in the Indian state of Maharashtra. It is located in the Khed taluka of Ratnagiri district, and is 17 km (11 mi) from the town of Khed.

The population of Ashti is 2000, with around 150 dwellings. Most of the people are engaged in farming and fisheries, but some have also expatriated to countries in the Middle East and Africa to work. The main religion followed is Islam.

== History ==
Since antiquity, the Konkan coast has had maritime mercantile relations with major ports on the Red Sea and the Persian Gulf. Konkani Muslims can trace their ancestry to traders from Hadhramaut (in Yemen or South Arabia), some who fled from Kufa in the Euphrates valley, about the year 700, the North of Indian (Haryana/Punjab) as well as various regions of Arabia and broader Middle East. others arriving as traders or mercenaries. By the 10th century, Ceul (Chaul), Dabhol had a significant Muslim presence with mosques and self-governance. Subsequent waves of migration were driven by upheavals like the Karmatian revolt (923–926 CE) and Mongol invasions (1258 CE). Despite (Chaul) and Dabhol prominence under the Ahmadnagar kingdom (1490–1626), Muslim rule was never firmly established in Konkan, and forced conversions were absent. Most Konkani Muslims are thus of mixed foreign descent. . According to Jalal al-Din al-Suyuti, Muslims first arrived in the Konkan region in 699 CE—less than 70 years after the death of Prophet Muhammad in 632 CE.

In the later eighteenth and early nineteenth centuries, Konkani Muslims became influential sailors, merchants, and government employees as the port city of Bombay (present Mumbai) began developing.

== Education ==
There are two schools in Ashti. One is an English Medium primary school named National English Medium School, and the other is a government-run Urdu medium secondary school.

== Transport and communication ==
In addition to being connected to Khed via ST Bus Service, boat services are also available through Ashti Port (Pakti) which connects Ashti to Aamshet.

== Surnames ==
Some of the people living here have surnames like Gondhlekar, Rawal, Bijle, Chougle, Jasnaik, Maldolkar, Parkar, Arawkar, Sange, Khatib, Sain, Bukhari, Inarkar and Nilikkar.

== Climate ==
The climate is cool and pleasant during the months between November and February. The Summer season lasts from March to Mid-June, when the temperature can reach in the 37 °C (99 °F). The rainy season lasts from June to September.

== See also ==
- Bahirwali
- Bhoste
- Karji
- Kondivali
- Ratnagiri
- Savnas
- Shirshi
