= Shirshi =

Village in Maharashtra

- village
- Location in Maharashtra, India Shirshi (India)
- Coordinates: 17°39′56″N 73°23′5″E
- Country: India
- State: Maharashtra
- District: Ratnagiri

Languages
  - Official: Kokni
- Time zone: UTC+5:30 (IST)
- PIN: 415727
- Telephone code: 02356
- Vehicle registration: MH-08
- Climate: Very hot in Apr–May and very cold in Dec–Jan (Köppen)

Shirshi is a village in Kokan on the banks of the Jagbudi River. It is part of Khed Taluka of Ratnagiri.

Shirshi, situated in the Ratnagiri district of Maharashtra, is renowned for its exquisite Alphonso mangoes, alongside a variety of seasonal fruits such as jackfruit, cashew nuts, jamun, and chikoo.

The primary agricultural activity in the region is rice cultivation, supplemented by the production of three varieties of grains, collectively referred to in the Kokni language as Toor Dal.

The village is characterized by numerous residential clusters, commonly referred to as Mohallas and Vadis, which include:

Varachi Vadi Khalchi Vadi Madhli Vadi Mukadam Vadi Chauan Vadi Patil Vadi Gurav Vadi Chinkate Vadi Buddha Vadi Mali Vadi These distinct enclaves contribute to the cultural and social fabric of Shirshi, reflecting the community's heritage and agricultural practices.

== Location ==
The village has a beautiful view from the Konkan Railway bridge, looking over a long stretch of green rice fields that reach the hills. It has around 300 houses, mostly built on higher ground to stay safe from heavy rains and floods. The village is halfway between the towns of Khed and Panhalje, and about 15 kilometers (9.3 miles) from Khed

== History ==
Since antiquity, the Konkan coast has had maritime mercantile relations with major ports on the Red Sea and Persian Gulf. Konkani Muslims can trace their ancestry to traders from Hadhramaut (in Yemen or South Arabia), some who fled from Kufa in the Euphrates valley, about the year 700, the North of Indian (Haryana/Punjab) as well as various regions of Arabia and broader Middle East. others arriving as traders or mercenaries. By the 10th century, Ceul (Chaul), Dabhol had a significant Muslim presence with mosques and self-governance. Subsequent waves of migration were driven by upheavals like the Karmatian revolt (923–926 CE) and Mongol invasions (1258 CE). Despite (Chaul) and Dabhol prominence under the Ahmadnagar kingdom (1490–1626), Muslim rule was never firmly established in Konkan, and forced conversions were absent. Most Konkani Muslims are thus of mixed foreign descent. . According to Jalal al-Din al-Suyuti, Muslims first arrived in the Konkan region in 699 CE—less than 70 years after the death of Prophet Muhammad in 632 CE.

In the later eighteenth and early nineteenth centuries, Konkani Muslims became influential sailors, merchants, and government employees as the port city of Bombay (present Mumbai) began developing.

== Facilities ==
Unlike many other villages in India, Shirshi and nearby villages have modern services like Electricity, Mobile Network, TV, and internet. When phones first came to India in the mid-1980s, the village leader got the first phone line for Shirshi. TV also arrived around that time, and now the village has cable TV along with satellite services from companies like TATA, Airtel, and Reliance.

All major mobile networks work in Shirshi, and landline phones are available from MTNL and BSNL. The State Bank of India, India’s biggest bank, has a branch in Karji, about 3 kilometers (1.9 miles) from Shirshi. The village also has a Post Office that handles mail and Postal Savings Accounts for the people. Each day, mail is sent to the Karji Post Office, with the main Post Office for the area in Khed.

=== Education ===
Shirshi is home to an Urdu Primary School (up to Standard 7) and a Marathi High School (up to SSC). In addition to these local institutions, several other schools and educational facilities are located nearby. Students who complete their primary education in Urdu often pursue higher studies at Adarsh High School in Karji, Haji Mukadam School in Khed, L.T.T. English Medium School and Junior College in Khed, or the National School in the neighboring village of Savnas. There is also a Marathi medium High School in Shiv, situated across the Jagbudi River.

For junior college and degree education, various institutes in Khed are available, and DBJ College in Chiplun is well-regarded for post-secondary education. Recently, the establishment of Yogita Dental College in Khed has significantly enhanced opportunities for students seeking dental education.

=== Transportation ===
==== Air ====
The nearest Airport is Mumbai's Chhatrapati Shivaji Airport, located at around 250.0 km (155.3 miles) to the north from the village.

==== Railways ====
Khed railway station is about 17.0 km (10.6 miles) from the village, and is one of the main stations of the Konkan Railway line. Major trains going towards Mumbai and the southern region have their halts at the Khed railway station. The famous Dadar-Ratnagiri Passenger train has one full boogie reserved for the people boarding from Khed.

==== Road ====
The village is connected to the Khed town and hence to the NH-17 (Mumbai to Goa) through the local regional road (first it connects to Khed-Dapoli SH-104 and this road then connects to the NH-17 at Bharne Naka). State Transport buses famously called the ST buses (locally pronounced as 'aeshtee') run frequently to and from the Khed ST Depot. Direct buses are available for Mumbai, Pune, Thane, Kalyan, Kolhapur, Ratnagiri, Miraj, Vitthalwadi, Chiplun and many other nearby towns like Dapoli, Mandangad etc. from the Khed depot. From the Bharne Naka (about 2.0 km (1.2 miles) from Khed depot, it is a small junction at the NH-17), one can avail buses to virtually all the corners of Maharashtra, Goa and Karnataka. Auto Rickshaws are in abundance. With the two wheeler industry in full swing youngsters enjoy their conveyance through the motorbikes.

== Notable people ==
The people of Shirshi have a distinction of showing their presence in some of the Maharashtra's well known cities like Mumbai, Thane, Pune, Bhiwandi, Jalgaon, Khamgaon, Jalna, Akole, Latur and Solapur. Village people also live in Kuwait, Dubai, KSA, Qatar, Oman.

Majority of the people have their surnames as Hamdulay (or Hamdule), Mukadam, Chinkate, Patil and Chauhan. The other surnames include Siddique, Mandlekar, Walapkar, Tambe and Mali.

== See also ==
- Arabian Sea
- Ashti, Khed
- Bahirwali
- Bhoste
- Karji
- Kondivali
- Ratnagiri
- Savnas
