= Konkani Muslims =

Muslims of Konkan region

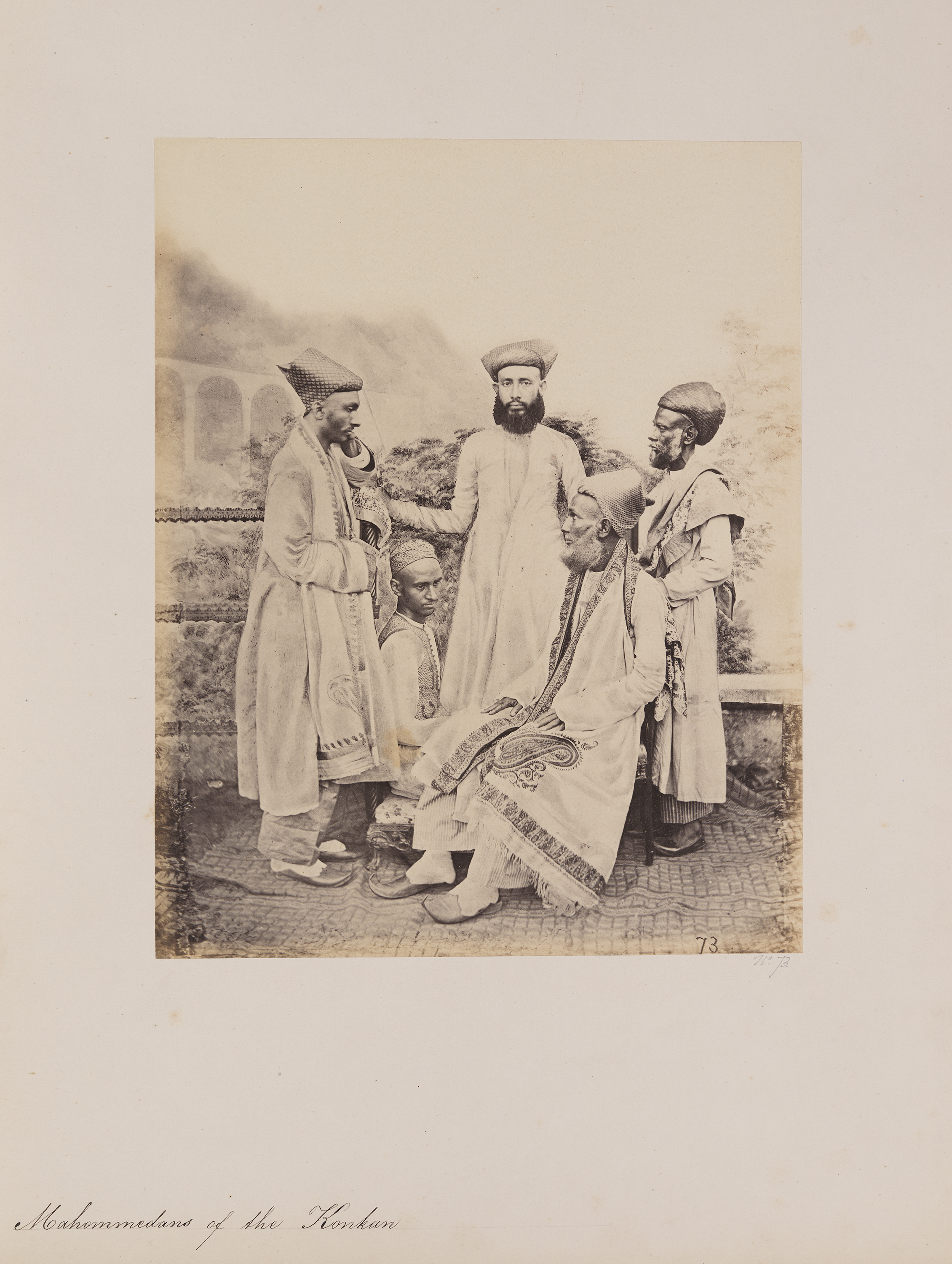
Mahommedans of the Konakan (1855-1862)

Konkani Muslims (or Kokani Muslims) are an ethnoreligious subgroup of the Konkani people of the Konkani region along the west coast of India, who practice Islam. Nawayath and "Nakhuda" Muslims from the North Canara district of Karnataka have similar origin as Konkani Muslims, but show a distinct ethnolinguistic identity due to geographical isolation of the Canara coast from the Konkan coast.

== Geography ==
The Konkani Muslim community forms a part of the larger Konkani-speaking demographic and are predominantly located in the Konkan division of the Indian state of Maharashtra. This includes the administrative districts of Mumbai, Mumbai Suburban, Palghar, Thane, Raigad, Ratnagiri, and Sindhudurg.

There is a Konkani Muslim community diaspora is based in the Persian Gulf states, the United Kingdom, and South Africa. Some Konkani Muslims migrated to Pakistan after the partition of India in 1947, and are presently settled in Karachi, as part of the larger Muhajir community.

== History ==
Since antiquity, the Konkan coast has had maritime mercantile relations with major ports on the Red Sea and Persian Gulf. Konkani Muslims can trace their ancestry to traders from Hadhramaut (in Yemen or South Arabia), some who fled from Kufa in the Euphrates valley, circa 700 CE, North India (Haryana or Punjab) as well as various regions of Arabia and broader Middle East. Others arrived as traders or mercenaries. By the 10th century, Ceul (Chaul), Dabhol had a significant Muslim presence with mosques and self-governance. Subsequent waves of migration were driven by upheavals like the Karmatian revolt (923–926 CE) and Mongol invasions (1258 CE). Despite (Chaul) and Dabhol prominence under the Ahmadnagar kingdom (1490–1626), Muslim rule was never firmly established in Konkan, and forced conversions were absent. Most Konkani Muslims are thus of mixed foreign descent. According to Jalal al-Din al-Suyuti, Muslims first arrived in the Konkan region in 699 CE — less than 70 years after the death of Prophet Muhammad in 632 CE.

In the late 18th and early 19th centuries, Konkani Muslims became influential sailors, merchants, and government employees as the port city of Bombay (present Mumbai) began developing. Dr. B. R. Ambedkar is believed to have visited Furus on May 17, 1937, while en route to Dapoli, and spent the night at Buddhawadi, Furus.

== Demography ==
Ancestry formed the basis for social stratification: Konkani people are direct descendants of Arab traders who formed an elite class over those who had indirect descent through intermarriages with local women converts to Islam. The Konkani people have a varied ethnic background as most Muslims within the region are descendants of people who migrated from the Delhi region, Hadhramaut (in Yemen or South Arabia), Iran and other parts of Arabia and the Middle East.

== Religion ==
Konkani Muslims follow the Shafi’i Islamic jurisprudence. This is in contrast to the Deccan regions, where Muslims adhere to the Hanafi school.

== Language ==
Konkanis speak a variety of dialects of Konkani collectively called Konkan Marathi.

== Cuisine ==
The cuisine of Konkani Muslims is meat and seafood. Its staple food is rice and bread made of rice (preferred at dinners) with meat/fish and lentils or vegetables. It is mainly influenced by Kashmiri people who settled in the late 1800s, fleeing tensions in the North of India.

== Notable Konkani Muslims ==
- A. R. Antulay - Indian politician, ex-Chief Minister of Maharashtra
- Hamid Dalwai - writer and social reformer
- Dawood Ibrahim, Indian crime boss and terrorist
- Zakir Naik - Islamic comparative theologian
- Ghulam Ahmed Hasan Mohammed Parkar, cricketer from Kalusta, Chiplun taluka, Ratnagiri district
- Fareed Zakaria - journalist
- Rafiq Zakaria - Indian politician, ex-Deputy Chairman, Rajya Sabha & Cabinet Minister in Maharashtra State

== See also ==
- Sapta Konkan
  - Furus
