= Karji =

Village in Maharashtra, India

Karji Karjee
- village
- Location in Maharashtra, India Karji (India)
- Coordinates: 17°38′45″N 73°22′30″E
- Country: India
- State: Maharashtra
- District: Ratnagiri

Government
  - Body: Grampanchyat

Population
  - Total: 415,727

Languages
  - Official: Marathi
- Time zone: UTC+5:30 (IST)
- PIN: 415727
- Telephone code: 02356
- Vehicle registration: MH -08
- Nearest city: Khed
- Literacy: 70%%
- Lok Sabha constituency: Raigard
- Vidhan Sabha constituency: Guhagar
- Civic agency: Grampanchyat

Karji is a small village in the Ratnagiri district of the State of Maharashtra, India. The village's code is 03988500, and its PIN code is 415727.

== History ==
Since antiquity, the Konkan coast has had maritime mercantile relations with major ports on the Red Sea and Persian Gulf. Konkani Muslims can trace their ancestry to traders from Hadhramaut (in Yemen or South Arabia), some who fled from Kufa in the Euphrates valley, about the year 700, the North of Indian (Haryana/Punjab) as well as various regions of Arabia and broader Middle East. others arriving as traders or mercenaries. By the 10th century, Ceul (Chaul), Dabhol had a significant Muslim presence with mosques and self-governance. Subsequent waves of migration were driven by upheavals like the Karmatian revolt (923–926 CE) and Mongol invasions (1258 CE). Despite (Chaul) and Dabhol prominence under the Ahmadnagar kingdom (1490–1626), Muslim rule was never firmly established in Konkan, and forced conversions were absent. Most Konkani Muslims are thus of mixed foreign descent. . According to Jalal al-Din al-Suyuti, Muslims first arrived in the Konkan region in 699 CE—less than 70 years after the death of Prophet Muhammad in 632 CE.

In the later eighteenth and early nineteenth centuries, Konkani Muslims became influential sailors, merchants, and government employees as the port city of Bombay (present Mumbai) began developing.

== Geography ==
Karji is located in the heart of Khadipatan, Taluka of Khed, on the Khed - Bahirwali road, about 18.0 km (11.2 miles) from Khed, and 20.0 km (12.4 miles) from its railway station. The village is surrounded by two rivers, one of which is the Jagbudi.

== Demographics ==
Karji consists of four sub-villages (Tambe Mohallah, Chougle Mohallah, Rehmat Mohallah, Amshet and Karji Gavalwadi), with over 600 homes and a total population approaching 3000. Community surnames include Jadhav, Tambe, Parkar, Chougle, Yedre, Burte, Dhanavade, Devrukhkar, Nadkar, Jagde and Gawade. The main religions are Hinduism, Buddhism and Islam (Hindu kunbi samaj). The main source of income is rice-farming, and most of the village's youth work in the Middle Eastern countries of Oman, Saudi Arabia, Kuwait, United Arab Emirates, Bahrain and Qatar. Some of them are settled in the United Kingdom, United States of America, South Africa and other countries.

== Amenities ==
Education is available in both Urdu and Marathi. A local high school and junior college in Karji was among the first institutions at this level in the region.

The village is equipped with a water supply system, a telephone exchange, and internet services including dial-up, postpaid, and broadband connectivity. Mobile phone services are available through multiple network providers. The village also has a government hospital, a postal facility, and a local bank branch. A bridge over a nearby creek connects to the Jagbudi River. Public transportation is provided by the state-run bus service.

== See also ==
- Ashti, Ratnagiri
- Bahirwali
- Kondivali
- Savnas
- Shirshi
