= Kondivali =

Village in Maharashtra

Kondivali Kondvil
- village
- Location in Maharashtra, India Kondivali (India)
- Coordinates: 17°40′37″N 073°23′01″E
- Country: India
- State: Maharashtra
- District: Ratnagiri
- Taluka: Khed

Area
  - Total: 3.88 km^{2} (1.50 sq mi)
- Elevation: 25 m (82 ft)

Population
  - Total: 739
  - Density: 190/km^{2} (493/sq mi)

Languages
  - Official: Marathi
  - Spoken: Konkani
- Time zone: UTC+5:30 (IST)
- Telephone code: 91-2356
- Vehicle registration: MH-08

Kondivali is a small village in Khed Taluka of Ratnagiri district in Maharashtra, India. The village is also known as 'Kondvil'. The main languages spoken here are Marathi and Konkani.

== History ==
The Prakritized form of the Sanskrit name "Kundin-palli" is mentioned as a name of Kondivali in the 15th-17th century Marathi-language text Mahikavatichi Bakhar, "palli" being the Shilahara-era suffix for a small village.

== Location ==
Kondivali is located on the banks of Jagbudi River, about 7.0 km (4.3 miles) southwest of the town of Khed, via the bridge over the Jagbudi River. Villages between Kondivali and Khed are Bhoste, Alsuray and Nilik. The village of Shiv Budruk is located about 3.0 km (1.9 miles) southeast along the river. Ghotan Nadi Dam is on the northern side of the village.

== Community ==
Kondivali consists of around 500 households in all, with a population of not less than 1500 people.^{[year not stated in source]} The main groups are Hindu Maratha, Muslims, and Buddhists. All live in communal harmony. Local Maratha families are Shinde, Utekar, Bhatose, Masaram, Karbele, Bhave Chavan (Kunbi), Kapse and Kondvilkar. Muslim surnames here are Dawre, Potrick, Mullaji, Sardar, Mukadam, Metkar, Mapkar and Katmale.

Hindu Maratha, Kunbis, Muslims and Buddhists are the village's landlords, but most of the Muslims now work abroad or in other places in India, whereas Hindus work in Mumbai and Surat. Other sects are engaged in agriculture and service. The district reported that 54.3% of the total populace were employed in agricultural activity. Shinde's have the biggest population in the village. Rentals are not available here.

== Amenities ==
Kondivali has many gardens for Alphonso mangoes, coconuts and cashews. Besides a huge well, there is a huge dam which impounds the Kondivali Reservoir, and allows for irrigation here and in neighboring villages, which provides water for the locals, besides serving as a picnic spot for a lot of people around the taluka. Given that the Konkan Railway runs amid the village, passing through the nearby tunnels and over a nearby bridge, a lot of people get attracted to this place. It has access to cable network, mobile internet connection (and thus a network for mobile phones). All of the houses are provided with electricity. With regard to sports], the village has a well-maintained cricket ground where hard-ball tournaments take place every year. In addition, Kondivali has an active gram panchayat role in its development, and a sub-post office, but the nearest post office is in Shiv Budruk.

=== Educational facilities ===
Kondivali has Z P Marathi Secondary School and an Urdu primary school. There is also a madrasa for girls from this village, and nearby villages.

=== Transport ===
Earlier, travel to Kondivali was by boat, walking or bicycle. Nowadays rickshaw or private cars are in action, and there is bus service from the government (MHSRT).

== See also ==
- Ashti, Khed
- Bahirwali
- Bhoste
- Karji
- Savnas
- Shirshi
