= Savnas =

Village in Maharashtra

- village
- Interactive map of Savnas
- Country: India
- State: Maharashtra
- District: Ratnagiri

Languages
  - Official: Konkani, Marathi, Urdu
- Time zone: UTC+5:30 (IST)
- Website: www.konkantimes.com

Savnas is one of the biggest villages in Khed Taluka at the bank of the Jagbudi River.

== History ==
Since antiquity, the Konkan coast has had maritime mercantile relations with major ports on the Red Sea and Persian Gulf. Konkani Muslims can trace their ancestry to traders from Hadhramaut (in Yemen or South Arabia), some who fled from Kufa in the Euphrates valley, about the year 700, the North of Indian (Haryana/Punjab) as well as various regions of Arabia and broader Middle East. others arriving as traders or mercenaries. By the 10th century, Ceul (Chaul), Dabhol had a significant Muslim presence with mosques and self-governance. Subsequent waves of migration were driven by upheavals like the Karmatian revolt (923–926 CE) and Mongol invasions (1258 CE). Despite (Chaul) and Dabhol prominence under the Ahmadnagar kingdom (1490–1626), Muslim rule was never firmly established in Konkan, and forced conversions were absent. Most Konkani Muslims are thus of mixed foreign descent. . According to Jalal al-Din al-Suyuti, Muslims first arrived in the Konkan region in 699 CE—less than 70 years after the death of Prophet Muhammad in 632 CE.

In the later eighteenth and early nineteenth centuries, Konkani Muslims became influential sailors, merchants, and government employees as the port city of Bombay (present Mumbai) began developing.

== Demographics and Religion ==
The majority of the population in Savnas practices Islam, with a significant presence of Buddhists, particularly in the area known as Buddha Wadi, and Hindus. The common surname "Surve" is shared by most inhabitants. Despite the religious diversity, the village has maintained peaceful relations among its communities. There are four Masjids in the village: Jaama, Minara, Baugh Mohalla, and Aameena Masjid (Kabrastan Masjid), serving the Muslim population. Additionally, there is a Dargah on a hilltop, which organizes an annual Urs, though the number of devotees has been declining in recent years. A Buddhist temple and a Hindu temple also add to the spiritual fabric of the village.

== Education and Economy ==
Savnas offers education through a primary school up to Grade 7. The high school, which used to extend to Grade 10, has closed due to a decrease in student enrollment. For further studies, most students travel to colleges in nearby towns like Karji or Khed. Economically, the village's major source of income comes from remittances sent by the semi-skilled and skilled workforce employed in the Gulf countries. While agriculture, animal husbandry, and fishing were once the backbone of the local economy, they have been neglected since the 1970s as younger generations seek better-paying jobs abroad.

== Culture and Traditions ==
The people of Savnas maintain strong cultural ties, often returning to visit despite working in different professions such as doctors, engineers, and lawyers. Traditional attire in the village includes shirts and lungis for men, and sarees or salwar suits for women. Despite the shift in economic focus and the modern influences from abroad, the village has preserved its cultural and religious harmony, making it a unique example of peaceful coexistence amidst diversity.

== Transportation ==
The village is well connected by road with distance of 24 km from the nearest KHED town. There are about six MSRTC buses which daily run between Savnas village & Khed town. Daily there are three MSRTC (Maharashtra State Road Transport Corporation) buses commuting between Mumbai & Thane cities from Savnas village.

== Geographical location ==
The village of Savnas is blessed with plains, mountains and a river.

== See also ==
- Ashti, Khed
- Bahirwali
- Bhoste
- Karji
- Kondivali
- Shirshi
