= Kelane =

Kelane may refer to:

- Kelane (bread), a type of Kurdish bread or pastry
- Kelane (village), a small village in Khed, in Ratnagiri district, Maharashtra State in India
