= Aryadurga devi, Devihasol =

Hindu temple in Maharashtra, India

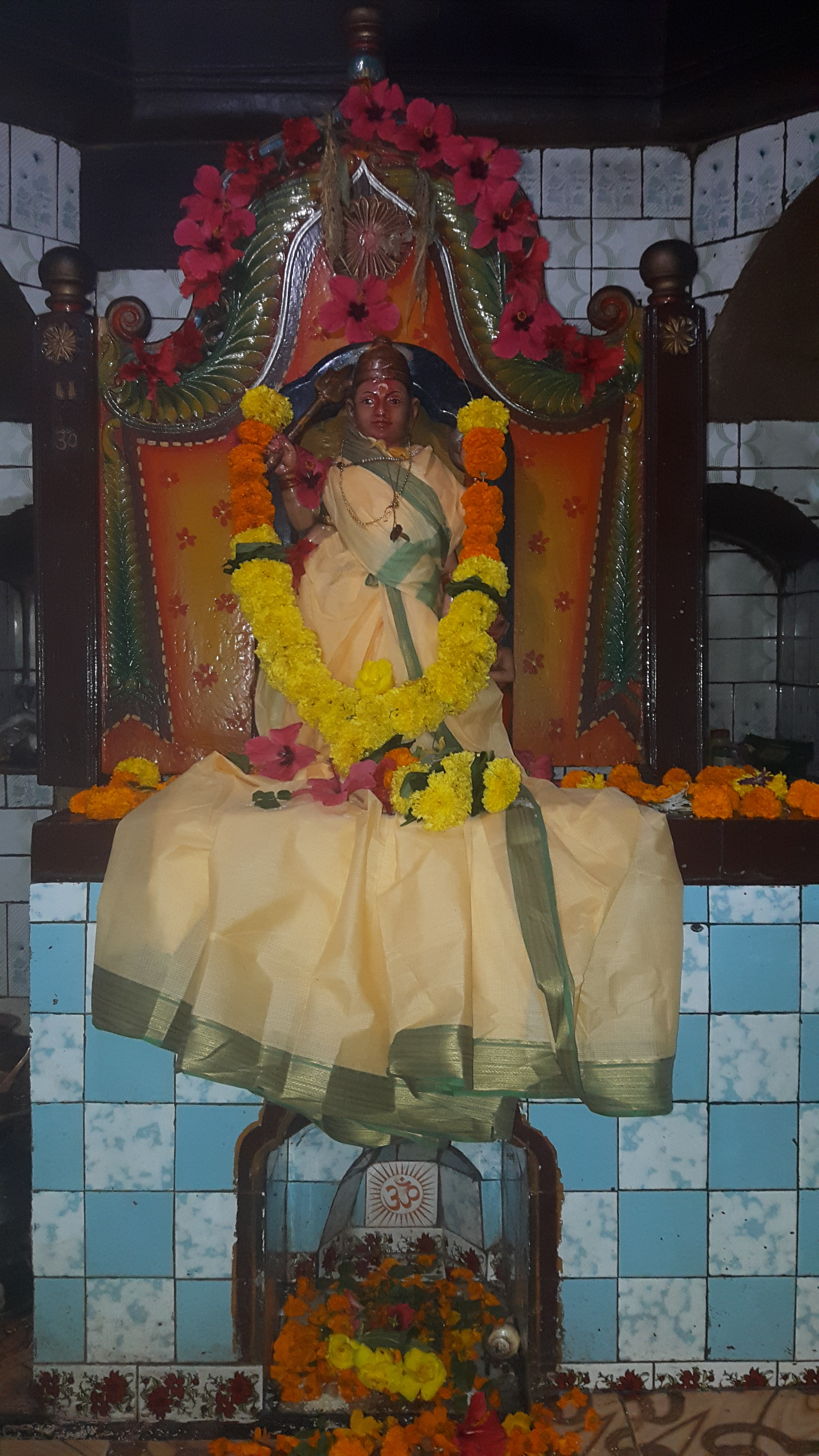
- The shrine inside the Aryadurga devi temple

- Location within Maharashtra

Religion
- Affiliation: Hinduism
- District: Ratnagiri

Location
- Location: Devihasol, Rajapur
- State: Maharashtra
- Country: India

Website
- www.facebook.com/shreeaaryadurga/

Aryadurga devi, Devihasol आर्यादुर्गा देवी देवीहसोळ, is a Hindu temple situated in Devihasol village in Rajapur taluka, Maharashtra, India. It is 18 km (11 mi) from Rajapur, 52 km (32 mi) from Ratnagiri and 380 km (240 mi) from Mumbai. Many devotees come to visit this temple. The fair of Aryadurga devi and Navadurga devi (bhalavli) is also famous, occurring annually in October on the eighth day of the Hindu Navratri festival. Goddess Aryadurga is the Kuldevi of many Karahde Brahmin. Several other temples, including in the towns of Mahakali, Adivare, Marleshwar, and Ganpatipule are located nearby.

== Mythological story ==
English Translation by Google Translate (Verification Needed)

The main temple of Shri Aryadurga Matte is located at Ankola, in North Karnataka. In addition, the other temples of the mother are located in the Devihasol area of Kudal, Kankavali, and Rajapur talukas in the Ratnagiri district. All areas of the Aryudurga mother are the Jagrut Devasthan.

In the story, there was a cruel demon named Vratsaru, who was very strong and proud of his shyness. He destroyed his enemies and ruled over the earth. After that, his importance grew so much that he attacked heaven and captured Indra and the Harbun paradise. Surrendered to all Gods Lord Vishnu, Brahma and Mahadev, and told them about the events that happened. The power created from the divine power of Goddess Trimurti as well as Goddess Devta. From the Vishnutaja, the hands and hair received from the Goddess, from the moment, the breast, the abdomen from the womb, the surface of the earth, the waist, the feet from the feet, the feet from the sunlight, the nose from the Kuberateja, the Prajapati tejata tooth, the air from the eyes, the ears received from the fire. Lord Mahadev gave Trishul to the Goddess, Lord Vishnu gave his Sudarshan Chakra, Brahma gave his Brahma, handed it over, Varunudeva gave the Varunpasha, Vayudeva gave his divine bow, Indra gave his thunder, Agni Dev gave divine power, Marathas gave conch shells, All deities devi He gave his power. Such a goddess, Ayaadurga mother, worshiped all the gods and goddesses on the divine form of her mother. The youngster was frightened by seeing the divine radiance of the Divine. There was a bitter battle between the two. At last, the mother killed the bullocks and made peace everywhere. Goddess Deity honoured Devi Aryadurga.

A story is also prevalent in the Aryadurga Devi manifestation at Hasol. Palsule Desai was a gentleman who stayed near Hasol village near Rajapur in Konkan. He was a very big worshiper of the Goddess. Desai used to go to Ankola (Karnataka) to worship Goddess AryaDurga every year. During his last visit he prayed to Goddess Aryadurga and told her that due to old age he would not be able to come for Devi's Darshan from the following year onward. He told the Goddess that he had worshipped her with full devotion, but now this was his last visit. Aryadurga Devi was pleased with his devotion. The same night she appeared in Desai's dream and told him that he did not have to come for her Darshan. She said she was very pleased with his devotion, and so she would follow him to his house on his journey as he walked home. But during the journey he should not turn around and see. When Desai came to the border of DeviHasol village, he heard the sound of Devi's Anklets, which caused him to look back with curiosity. Arya Durga Devi appeared in the spiritual form of the mother for a moment and then disappeared. At that spot her footprints appeared and her temple was built at that very spot. Even today you can see the footprints of Arya Durga Devi inside the Mandir.

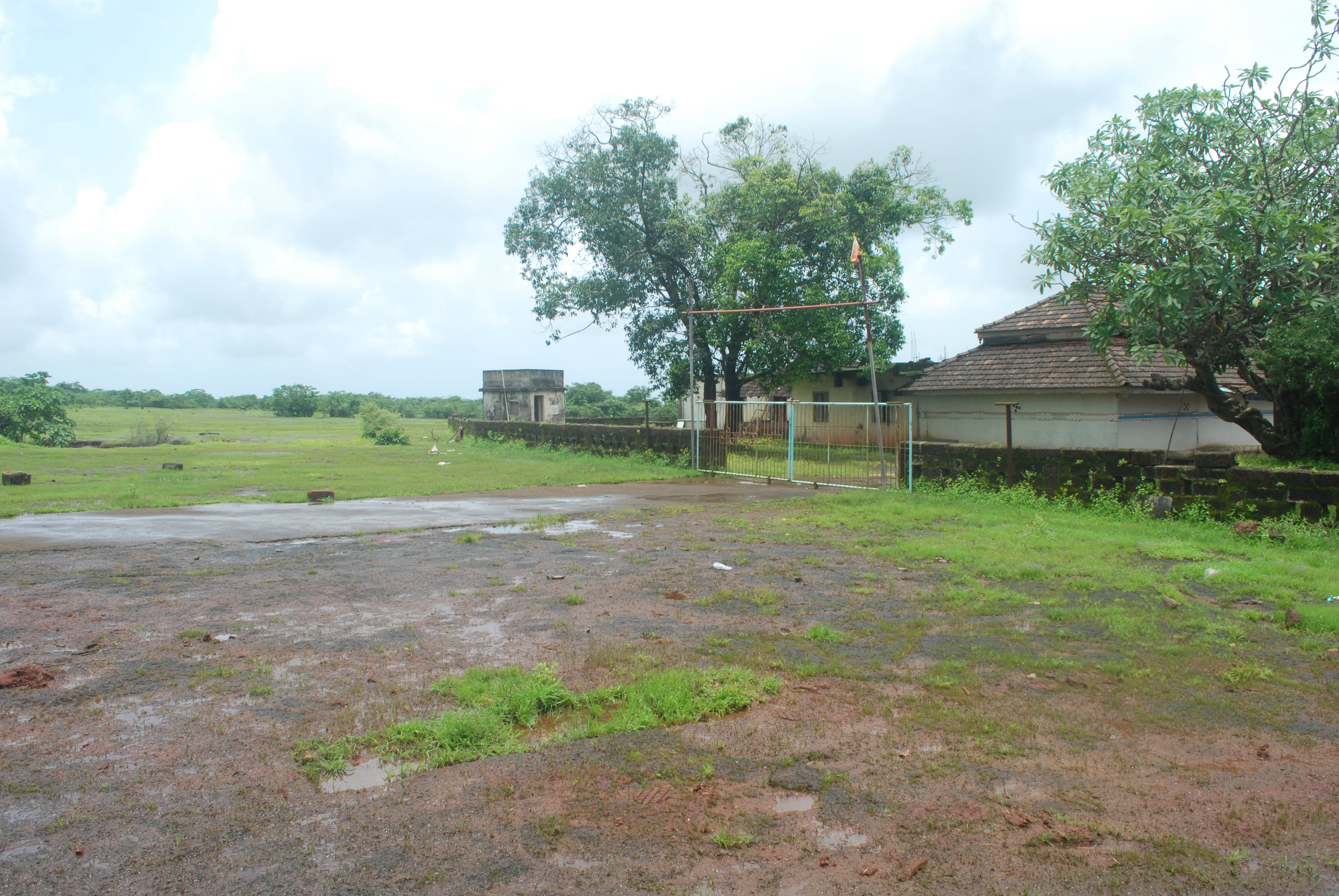
Devi Hasol Plateau in Konkan in Ratnagiri district, Maharashtra, India photographed in winter 2019
