= Kurang =

Village in Maharashtra

Coordinates: 26°08′N 82°02′E

- village
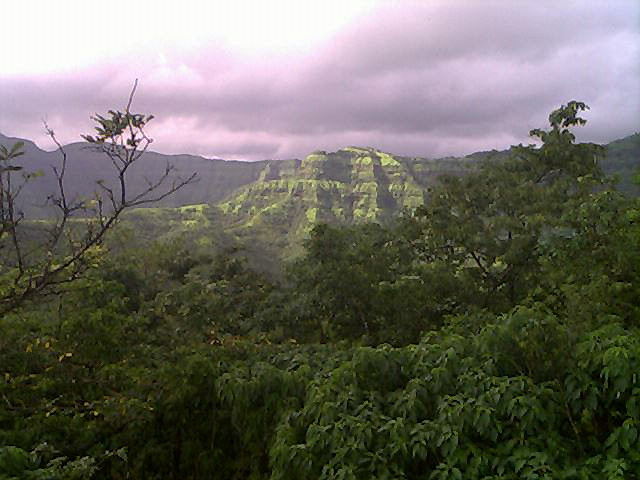
- Sahyadri through thick vegetation
- Interactive map of Kurang
- Country: India
- State: Maharashtra
- District: Ratnagiri

Languages
  - Official: Marathi
- Time zone: UTC+5:30 (IST)
- Telephone code: 02351
- ISO 3166 code: IN-MH
- Vehicle registration: MH 08
- Nearest city: Lanjja
- Lok Sabha constituency: Rajapur, Maharashtra
- Vidhan Sabha constituency: Rajapur, Maharashtra

Kurang is a small village in the Ratnagiri district of Maharashtra in India. Ratnagiri is a coastal district on the Arabian Seafront.

== Geography ==
The landmass on the western part of Maharashtra along the Arabian Sea, sandwiched between the sea and a mountain range named Sahyadri, is known as Konkan. Kurang is situated at the foothills of Sahyadri mountains. A seasonal river named 'Naveri' runs through the hilly landscape.

With its evergreen vegetation and hilly landscape, it is tranquil in the months of monsoon and after.

== Demographics ==
Kurang has a small population because the majority of the people there have migrated to Mumbai, the biggest city of India. However, their attachment to their native place brings them back every summer and during the Ganapati festivals.

== Transport ==
Public transport to Kurang is from Lanja, a tehsil town and from Rajapur, another tehsil in the vicinity. Six State Transport (ST) of Maharashtra buses ply during the day. One can avail themselves of auto rickshaws and other private vehicles like jeeps. Kolhapur city is just about 80 kilometers away, and can be approached by Anuskura Ghat section, which lies in another village in the vicinity. Ratnagiri city is about 87 kilometers from the village and a regular State Transport bus ply between the village and city. Kurang is surrounded by Zarye, Parule of Rajapur Taluka and Kondge, Hardkhale of Lanja Taluka, on the east side Sahyadri ranges separate it from Shahuwadi Taluka of Kolhapur district.

One can also drive to Kurang from Mumbai on National Highway 17 (NH17) by driving across Lanja town, then turning left from Watul village, which takes one on state highway towards Kurang. Vilavade is the nearest railway station on Konkan Railway route, from where one has to take a private vehicle for another 20 km journey towards Kurang.

== Economy ==
Agriculture and related businesses are prominent among the residents. Horticulture is catching up. This region can grow good quality Alphanso Mangos and cashew nuts. Good quality teakwood is also planted en masse.

There are two primary schools in the village; for secondary school, children have to walk about five kilometers to a neighboring village. Education is in the Marathi language.

From here, you can visit the Vishalgad/Vishalgarh by trekking your way through the forest and Sahyadris which was under the reign of Surve Dynasty of Kumbharkani.

Electricity, telephones, and piped drinking water are a few of the developments of the last 10–15 years. A few grocery shops are there to serve the needs of the locals. Cellphone network is not available.

The language spoken here is Marathi, though some can understand Hindi and English.

== Cultural ==
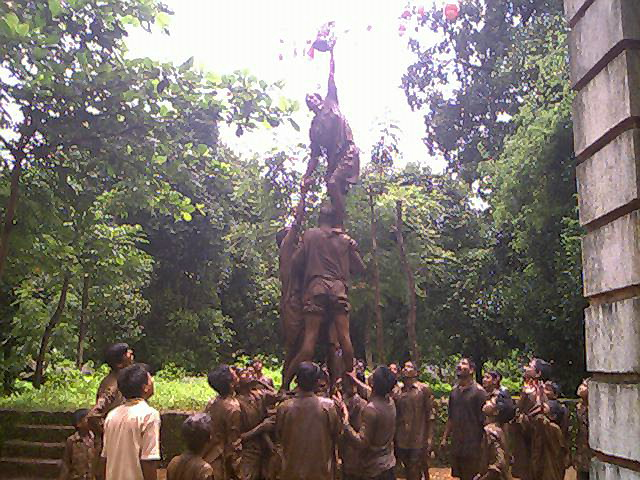
Dahikala festival

Goddesses Kurangadevi and Dev Rameshwar are the village deities. Kurangadevi is ritually consulted on every major aspect. Rameshwar Temple has as a major fair, in the month of February, on the day of Shivratri.

Major festivals are Ganapati Utsav, Dahikala, Holi or Shimga, Navratra, Diwali, and Shivaratri; Ganapati Utsav is the biggest of all of them. People visit their native village during Ganapati festival, which is celebrated with gusto. Another major festival is Holi, which is locally better known as Shimga.
