= Devhare =

Village in Maharashtra

- village
- Interactive map of Devhare
- Coordinates: 17°58′18″N 73°09′46″E
- Country: India
- State: Maharashtra
- District: Ratnagiri

Languages
  - Official: Marathi
- Time zone: UTC+5:30 (IST)
- Vehicle registration: MH-

Devhare is a village in Mandangad taluka in Ratnagiri district, Maharashtra, India, about 210 km from Mumbai by road. All state transport buses go through Devhare. Devhare is surrounded with hills and has an average temperature of 26 °C, reaching 42 °C in April. Devhare has little tourist industry, and some agriculture industry producing the Ratnagiri "Happoos" mango variety. A beach named Kelshi is about 15 km from Devhare.

Marathi is the common language. Some people also know Hindi and English. Since the Konkan region Devhare resides in is a pilgrimage destination, non-vegetarian food is rare. Fish curries are sold on the town's outskirts. In one preparation, the local mangoes are dried and used to make pancakes called ambapoli.
