= Bahirwali =

Village in Maharashtra

Baharwali
- Village
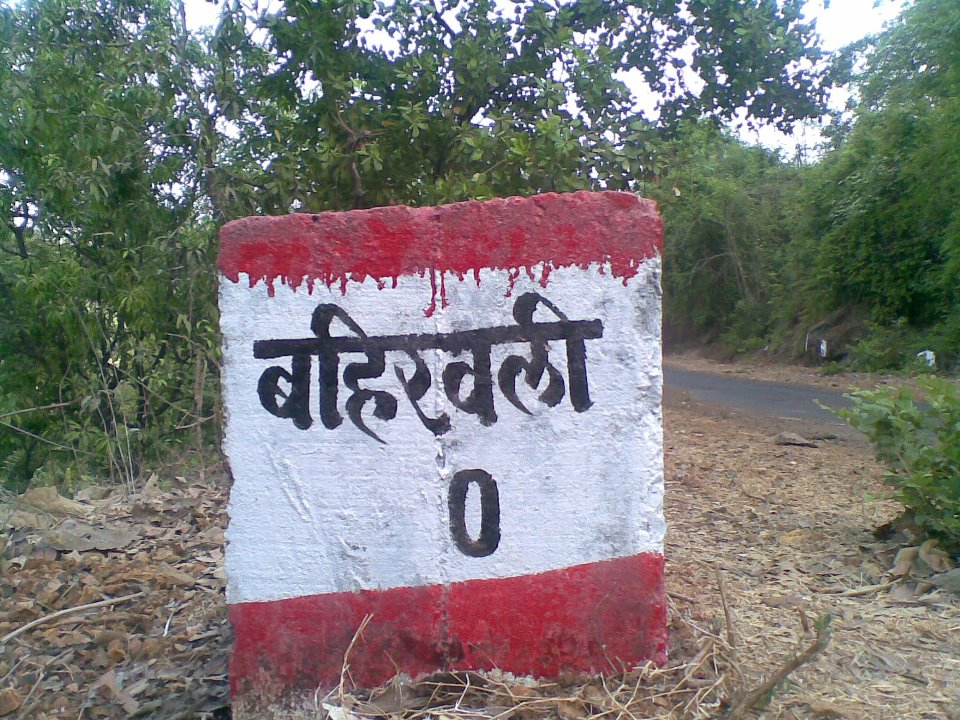

- Location within Maharashtra Location within India
- Coordinates: 17.594449°N 73.423262°E
- Country: India
- State: Maharashtra
- District: Ratnagiri
- Taluka: Khed

Baharwali is the largest village in the taluka of Khed, India. Located about 28 km (17.40 mi) from the town of Khed, Ratnagiri, Baharwali is situated near the banks of the Jagbudi River and Vashishti River.

At the centre of the Jagbudi River, which begins at Baharwali and ends at Khopi near Khed, is an island called Diva, which is believed to be the first settlement of Baharwali in the 15th century. Its population began moving to India's mainland due to an increasing population.

Baharwali is divided into several localities: Baharwali Mohhla No. 1, Baharwali MOHLLA No. 2, Baharwali MOHLLA No. 3, Baharwali Buddha Wadi, and Baharwali Kunbhi Wadi (Bhaganewadi, Tep Wadi, Dewool wadi, Lad Wadi, Shigwan Wadi, madhali wadi, and Bahirwali Bhoi Wadi).

The gram panchayat (village council) or village panchayat is responsible for the developments in Baharwali. Headed by a sarpanch, its gram panchayat is divided into three parts: Bahirwali No. 1, 2, and 3.

== History ==
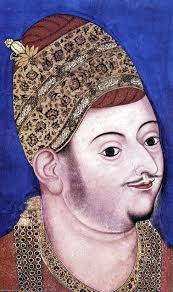
Sultan Yousuf Adil Shah.

Since antiquity, the Konkan coast has had maritime mercantile relations with major ports on the Red Sea and Persian Gulf. Konkani Muslims can trace their ancestry to traders from Hadhramaut (in Yemen or South Arabia), some who fled from Kufa in the Euphrates valley, about the year 700, the North of Indian (Haryana/Punjab) as well as various regions of Arabia and broader Middle East. others arriving as traders or mercenaries. By the 10th century, Ceul (Chaul), Dabhol had a significant Muslim presence with mosques and self-governance. Subsequent waves of migration were driven by upheavals like the Karmatian revolt (923–926 CE) and Mongol invasions (1258 CE). Despite (Chaul) and Dabhol prominence under the Ahmadnagar kingdom (1490–1626), Muslim rule was never firmly established in Konkan, and forced conversions were absent. Most Konkani Muslims are thus of mixed foreign descent. . According to Jalal al-Din al-Suyuti, Muslims first arrived in the Konkan region in 699 CE—less than 70 years after the death of Prophet Muhammad in 632 CE.

In the later eighteenth and early nineteenth centuries, Konkani Muslims became influential sailors, merchants, and government employees as the port city of Bombay (present Mumbai) began developing.

In the 15th century, Baharwali was likely inhabited during the rule of Sultan Yusuf Adil Shah in Konkan. Baharwali's first settlement, called Diva, was on an island located at the centre of the Jugburi River. As the population grew, people started moving to the mainland opposite the island.

== Government ==
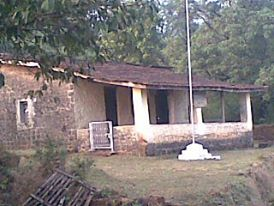
Punchayat office.

The gram panchayat is responsible for administrative and developmental work. It is headed by the sarpanch of the village. The gram panchayat is now divided into two parts for better management.

== Festivals ==
URUS BAHTE PEER, URUS IBRAHIM SHAIKH WALI, URUS SHAIKH NOOR SHAH MADAR, JALAL PEER, Dr. Babasaheb Ambedkar Jayanti, Buddha Jayanti, Vijaya Rashmi, Sai Baba Utsav is on 19 May annually (Shigavan Wadi, Bahirawali). Hanuman Jayanti, Mahashiv Ratri (Someshwar Temple – Bhaganewadi, Bahirawali), Ganesh Utsav, and Shimoga (Holi) are also celebrated. There are temples of the grāmadevatā, Kuldevata Shri Khem - Manai. Ibrahim Shaikh, a Sufi saint, is celebrated every February.

== Transport ==
A bus service is regularly run between Khed and Panhale Kazi, along with rickshaw and car service, and a train service is run from Mumbai to Khed, and Mumbai to Anjani.

== See also ==
- Karji
- Western Ghats
