= Khed Caves =

Buddhist caves in Khed, Maharashtra, India

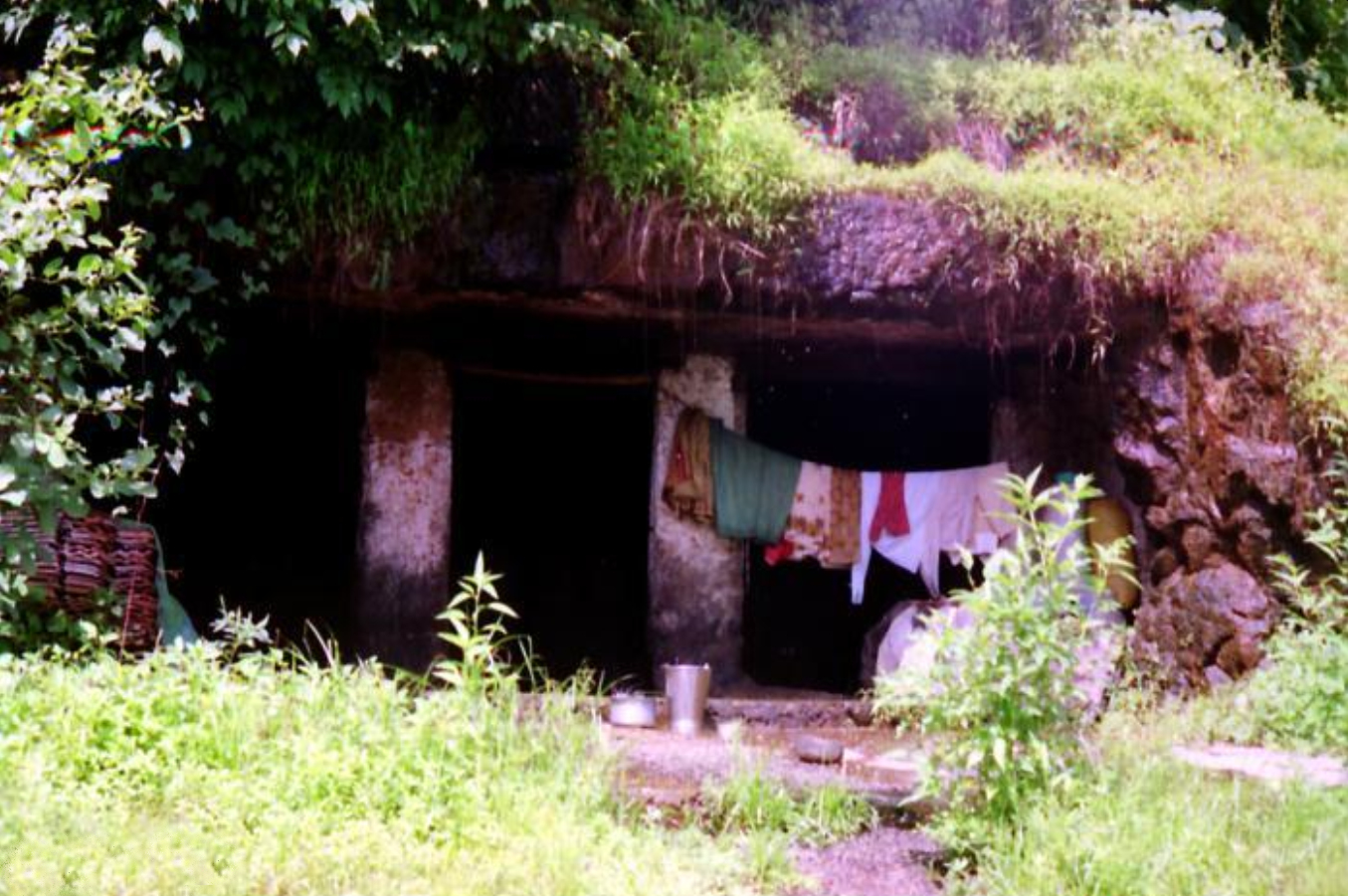
- Khed caves

- Location within India Location within Maharashtra
- Coordinates: 17.721544°N 73.398402°E

Khed Caves, also Bouddh Caves, are a series of ancient Buddhist caves in the city of Khed, Maharashtra, India.

The group of caves comprises a large vihara, with three cells for monks, and with a stupa in the back located in an oblong room. There are also four smaller caves in the group. The caves are in a rather derelict state.
