= Kalusta =

Village in Maharashtra

- Village
- Location in Maharashtra, India Kalusta (India)
- Coordinates: 17.553°N 73.4752°E
- Country: India
- State: Maharashtra
- Division: Konkan
- District: Ratnagiri
- Taluka: Chiplun

Languages
  - Official: Konkani, Marathi, Urdu, Hindi, English
- Time zone: UTC+5:30 (IST)
- Climate: Humid (Köppen)

Kalusta is a village on the banks of Vashishti River, in Chiplun taluka, Konkan division of Maharashtra, India. It is located about 8.0 km (5.0 miles) from Chiplun.

== Notable individuals ==
- Ghulam Ahmed Hasan Mohammed Parkar, cricketer
- Zulfiqar Ahmed Hasan Parkar, Ghulam's brother and fellow cricketer

== See also ==
- Konkan
  - Gowalkot
- Western Ghats
