= Umberghar =

Village in Maharashtra

- Village
- Location in Maharashtra, India Umberghar (India)
- Coordinates: 17°57′52″N 73°23′50″E
- Country: India
- State: Maharashtra
- District: Ratnagiri
- Established: Somewhere in the year 1500

Government
  - Type: Group Gram Panchayat

Population (Above 500 people)
  - Total: Above 1,000 people

Languages
  - Official: Konkani
  - Other: Marathi, Urdu, Hindi, English.
- Time zone: UTC+5:30 (IST)
- PIN: 415706
- Telephone code: 02358
- Nearest town: Dapoli
- Created by Abdul Waheed Dabir, Edited by Affan Dabir

Umberghar is a small village located near the Vashisthi River (Dabhol Khadi) in Ratnagiri district in the state of Maharashtra in India. It is 256 km away from the state capital of Mumbai.

== Gallery ==
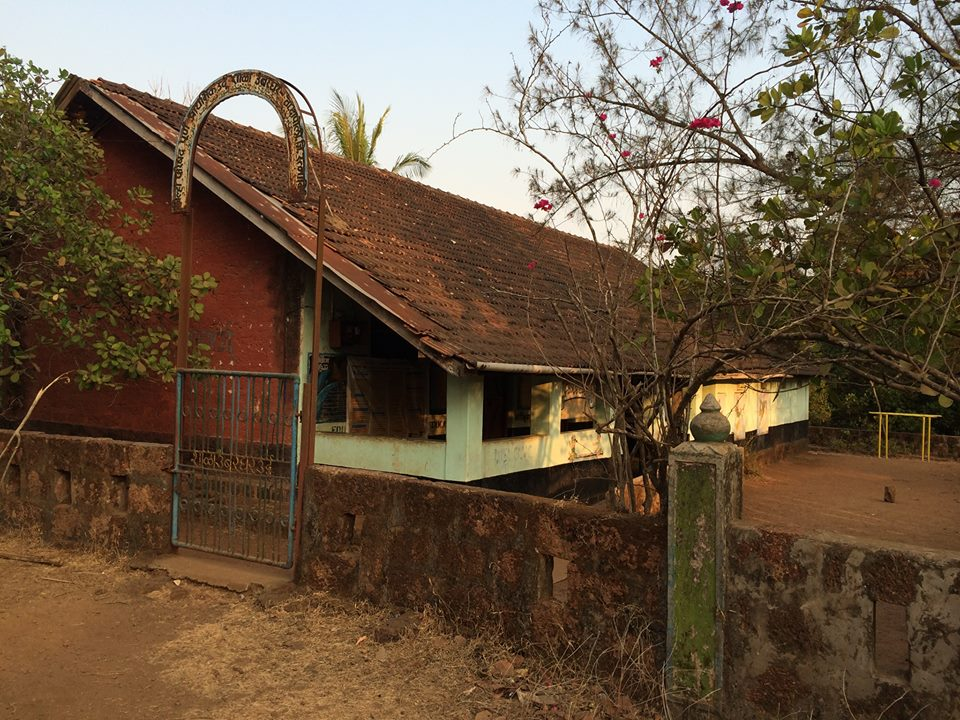
Zilla Parishad Full Primary Urdu School Umberghar

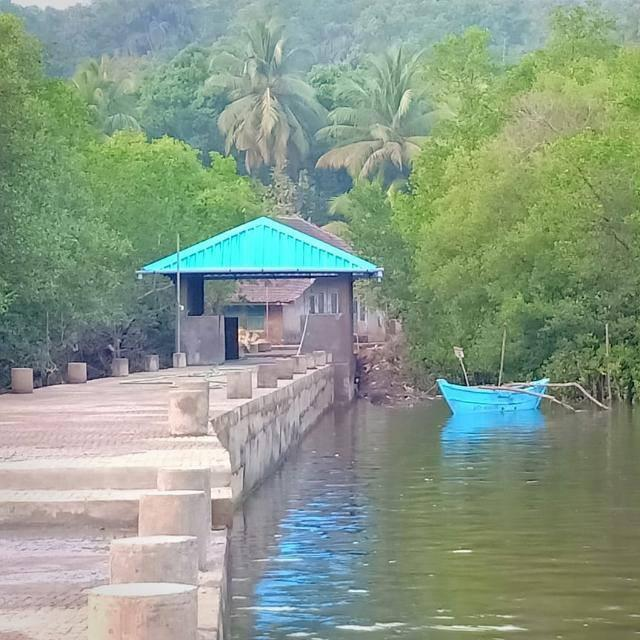
Umberghar New Jetty

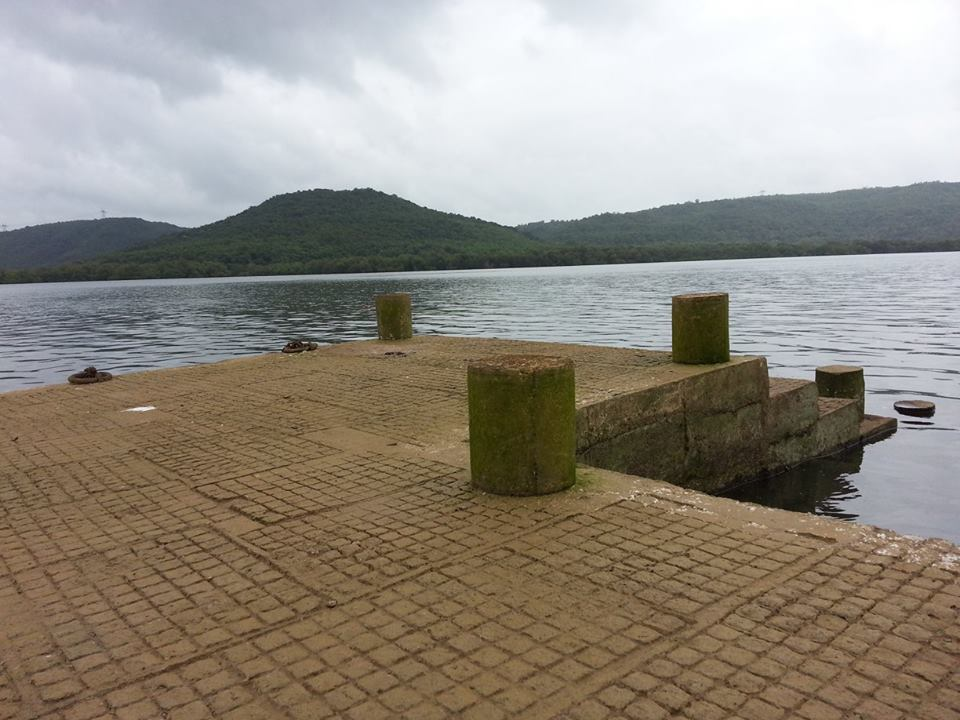
Umberghar Pakhti

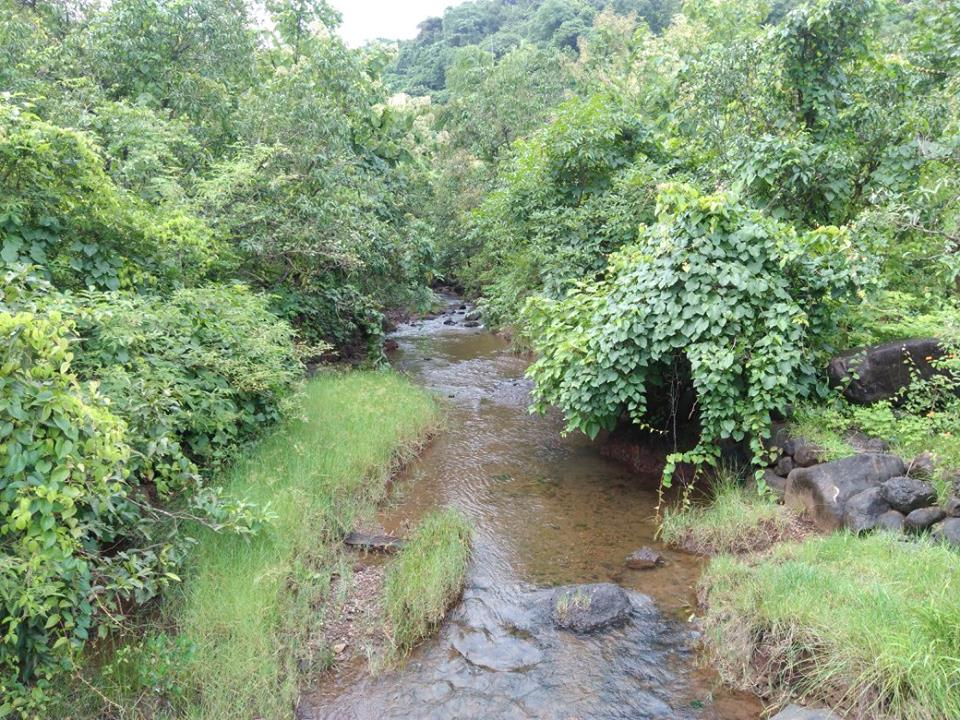
Umberghar Aamboro

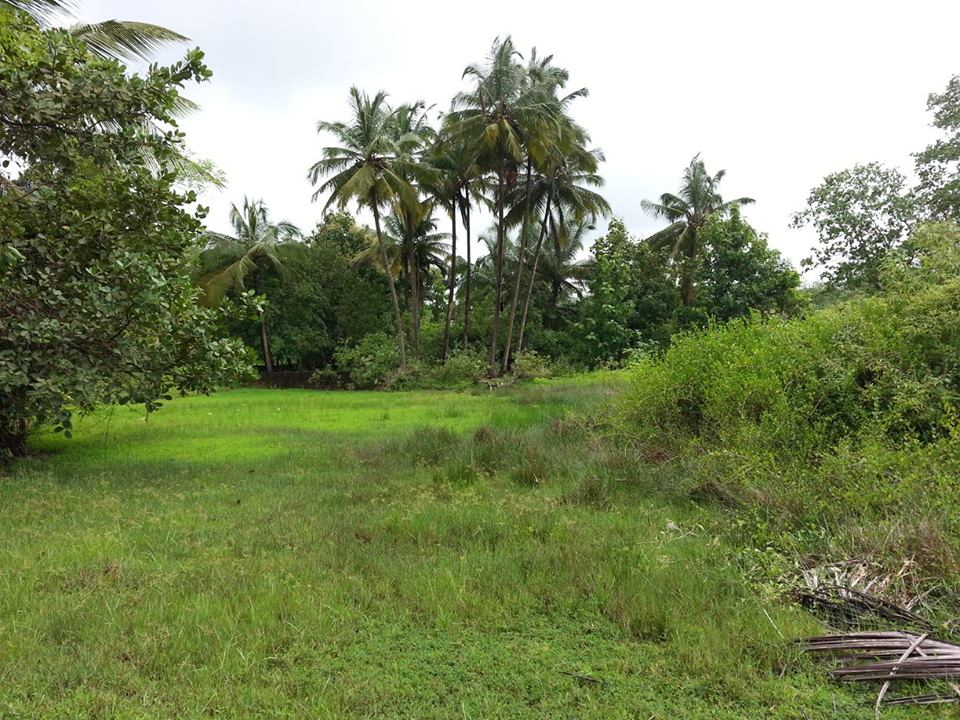
Umberghar valley
