= Satawali =

- Village ( Bazar Peth )
- Location in Maharashtra, India
- Coordinates: 16.85°N 73.55°E
- Country: India
- State: Maharashtra
- District: Ratnagiri
- Elevation: 166 m (545 ft)

Population (2001)
  - Total: 12,278

Languages
  - Official: Marathi
- Time zone: UTC+5:30 (IST)

Satawali is a census town in Lanja-Taluka Ratnagiri district in the Indian state of Maharashtra.

Satavali is a village about 12 miles up the Muchkundi Creek, surrounded by hills, 19 km from Bombay-Goa highway, in a valley with a river called Muchkundi.

Nearby cities are Lanja, Rajapur and Ratnagiri.

== Geography ==
Satawali is located at coordinates: 16°45'53"N 73°27'22" It has an average elevation of 166 metres (544 feet).

The village is in Taluka Lanja – Ratnagiri district. The national highway popularly known as Mumbai-Goa Highway passes through it. Nearest rail head is Adivali on Konkan Railway which is about 35 km away.

== History ==
From the time of the Peshva up to 1 August 1879, Satwali was made a sub-division.

== Demographics ==
Population is more than 12000.

== Climate ==
The temperatures are often below 10 °C in winters. In summer temperatures jump up to 40 °C.
