= Jagbudi River =

River in India

The Jagbudi river is the small river merging into Vashishti river. It meets Vasishthi near Bahirwali. It comes from Khed to Bahiravali. It Originates from Khopi, shirgaon, near Western Ghats region in Ratnagiri district, Maharashtra, India.

== Wildlife ==
The type of crocodile that would inhabit this region of India is the mugger crocodile.

== Settlements ==
Apart from Khed and Bahirwali, settlements along the river include Shiv, Ashti, Karji, Kondivali, Savnas and Shirshi.

== See also ==
- Bhoste
- Khopi (Nepali village development committee)
- Konkan
- Konkan division
- List of rivers of India
- Western Ghats
- Wildlife of India
