= Adivare =

Village in Maharashtra, India

- Village
- Location in Maharashtra, India Adivare (India)
- Coordinates: 16.7324°N 73.3602°E
- Country: India
- State: Maharashtra
- District: Ratnagiri

Government
  - Type: Grampanchayat
  - Body: Gram panchayat Adivare
- Demonym: Adivarekar

Languages
  - Official: Marathi
- Time zone: UTC+5:30 (IST)
- PIN: 416707
- ISO 3166 code: IN-MH
- Vehicle registration: MH-08

Adivare is a village in Ratnagiri district in the state of Maharashtra, India. The village is administrated by a Sarpanch who is an elected representative of village as per constitution of India and Panchayati raj (India).
