= Shringartali =

Shringartali Tali
- Village
- Country: India
- State: Maharashtra
- District: Ratnagiri

Population (2011)
  - Total: 3,300

Languages
  - Official: Konkani
- Time zone: UTC+5:30 (IST)
- PIN: 415724
- Telephone code: 02359
- Vehicle registration: MH-08
- Website: www.guhagar.co

Shringartali is a large village in the Guhagar Taluka region of Ratnagiri in the Indian state of Maharashtra. It is situated between Chiplun and Guhagar. The economy of Guhagar boomed after the RGPPL was commissioned in 1990. Agriculture includes alphanso mangoes (hapus), harvested from March to the end of May, and are distributed to Mumbai. It is the capital of Guhagar. Major businesses and educational institutes are located here. The town is on Guhagar-Bijapur highway.

== Demographics ==
As of the 2011 census the population was 3300 comprising 1760 males and 1540 females, giving a sex ratio of 875. There were 445 children aged 0-6 = 13.48 % of the village population, with a child sex ratio of 1005, significantly higher than the Maharashtra average of 894. The literacy rate was 89.46% (males 92.52%, females 85.88%) higher than the state average of 82.34%.

== Educational institutes ==
- Ali Public School, Shringartali [English Medium]
- Kond shringari Urdu high school
- New English school and junior college, Patpanhale.
- New English medium school
