= Bolani =

Afghan stuffed flatbread

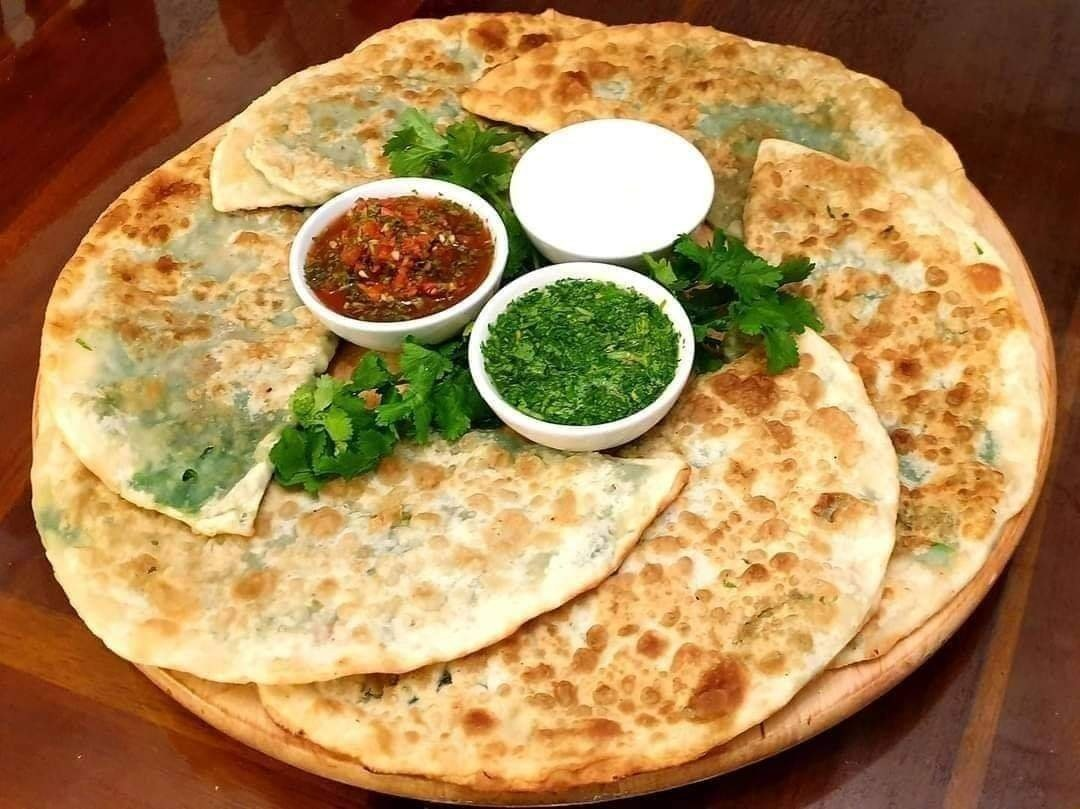
- Type: Flatbread
- Course: Appetizer, side dish, or main course
- Place of origin: Kabul, Afghanistan

Bolani or bulani is a stuffed flatbread from Afghanistan, fried with a filling. It has a thin crust and can be stuffed with a variety of ingredients, such as potatoes or leeks but also grated pumpkin, chives, red lentils or with minced meat. It can be served with plain yogurt or mint yogurt and is usually served with a doogh drink.

Bolani is made for special occasions like birthday parties, engagement parties or holidays. It is widely sold on the streets in Afghanistan.

== Variations ==
=== Eggroll-wrapper method ===
The method of using egg roll wrappers instead of making the dough for the bolani is a timesaving convenience often used in Western countries..The edges of the eggroll wrappers are lightly brushed with water to allow for sticking. The wrappers are then filled halfway either diagonally or lengthwise with the preferred filling. Each side is then fried until golden brown. This method is the easiest and fastest way of preparing bolani.

=== Baked dough method ===
Another popular method for making bolani is baking them. Although frying is the most popular method for special occasions, baking is becoming very popular among Westerners. While bolani was originally baked to cut back on fat, it is now becoming popular due to the unique flavor it imparts. Baking allows for a thicker crust that leads to a fluffy pastry filled with toppings. Some argue that baked bolani is not traditional due to its thick nature and meat-stuffed variations. Regardless, it remains as one of the most popular methods of preparing bolani in America.

=== Fried dough method ===
Bolani dough can also be fried. Using this method, the dough is made from a mixture of flour, salt, vegetable oil, and water. After the dough is flattened, fillings are added, then the dough is folded to cover the fillings, and the food is fried on a pan.

== Gallery ==
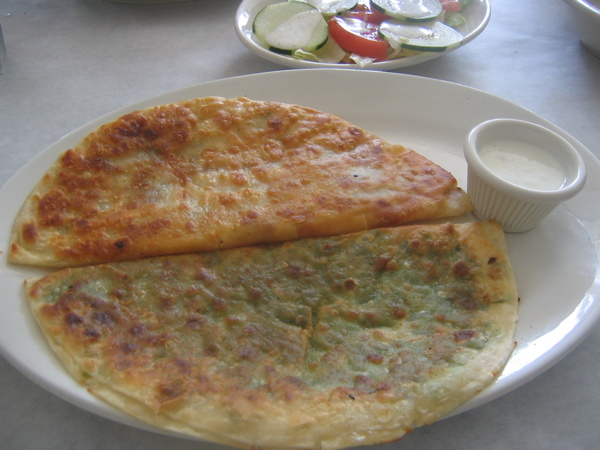
Bolani

== See also ==
- Gözleme
- Qistibi
- Qutab
- Kelane (bread)
