= Jalgaon, Ratnagiri =

Jalgaon
- Census town
- Location in Maharashtra, India
- Coordinates: 17.75°N 73.18°E
- Country: India
- State: Maharashtra
- District: Ratnagiri
- Elevation: 184 m (604 ft)

Population (2001)
  - Total: 5,448

Languages
  - Official: Marathi
- Time zone: UTC+5:30 (IST)
- Postal code: 415712

Jalgaon is a census town in Ratnagiri district in the Indian state of Maharashtra.

== History ==
Jalgaon is a native settlement of the Barves, or people of the Barve surname. Each year, during the Hindu Festival of Rama Navami, several hundreds of people gather here (especially Barve's)

== Geography ==
Jalgaon is located at 17.75°N 73.18°E. It has an average elevation of 184 metres (603 feet).

== Demographics ==
As of 2001 India census, Jalgaon had a population of 5448. Males constitute 51% of the population and females 49%. Jalgaon has an average literacy rate of 80%, higher than the national average of 59.5%: male literacy is 85%, and female literacy is 74%. In Jalgaon, 11% of the population is under 6 years of age. Most of the people in Jalgaon belong to the Chitpavan community. There are about 0.2% people belonging to the Scheduled Castes and Scheduled Tribes.
