= Waghivane =

Village in Maharashtra

Waghivane is a small village in Ratnagiri district, Maharashtra state in Western India. The 2011 Census of India recorded a total of 216 residents in the village. Waghivane's geographical area is 367 hectares (910 acres).
