= Kondgaon =

Village in Maharashtra

- Village
- Location in Maharashtra, India Kondgaon (India)
- Coordinates: 16.9854515°N 73.6918806°E
- Country: India
- State: Maharashtra
- District: Ratnagiri

Languages
  - Official: Marathi
- Time zone: UTC+5:30 (IST)
- PIN: 415801

Kondgaon is a village in Sangameshwar Taluka in Ratnagiri district of Konkan division of the Indian state of Maharashtra. It is a main village on the Ratnagiri to Kolhapur national highway. Kondgaon is located on the Kajali river.

== Crops ==
Rice, cashews and Alphanso mangoes are the major crops in Kondgaon.
