= Saitavde =

Village in Maharashtra

- village
- Location in Maharashtra, India Saitavde (India)
- Coordinates: 17°15′50″N 73°16′48″E
- Country: India
- State: Maharashtra
- District: Ratnagiri

Languages
  - Official: Marathi
- Time zone: UTC+5:30 (IST)
- PIN: 415613
- Vehicle registration: MH-
- Coastline: 0 kilometres (0 mi)

Saitavde, or Saitawada, is a small village on the Jaigad creek in Ratnagiri district. It is about 390 km southwest of Mumbai, and about 58 km to the north of Ratnagiri city.

== Geography ==
Saitavda is located at .

The entire northern part of the village overlooks the Shastri River, while the southern portion is surrounded by hills; therefore, giving it a scenic valley-look.

== History ==
Although the exact history of Saitavda is not known, the earliest mention is found in the Gazetteer of Bombay Presidency printed in 1880. In the report Saitavda is termed as a "petty division of Ratnagiri" during the Land Surveys conducted in 1827, 1853 and 1867–68.

== Demographics ==
Saitavda is spread over 5.44 km^{2}. The total population is around 3067, with about 692 households.

It is divided into: Borsai Mohalla, Khatib Mohalla, Gumbad Mohalla, Peth Mohalla, Shirkewadi, Boudhwadi and Chinchbandar.

- Language: Kokani, Marathi
- Food: Staple diet consists of rice
- STD code: 02357
- PIN code: 415613

== Climate ==
The climate is tropical with 3 main seasons:

- Summers (March to May) are hot with maximum temperature nearly touching 38 °C.
- Monsoons (June to September) are accompanied by regular rainfalls and looks attractive during this season.
- Winters (December to February) are pleasant with moderate day temperature and cool nights (15 °C).

Saitavda receives an annual rainfall of 3500 mm approx.

Overall, the climate was healthy and pure since there were no industries/factories nearby. But with JSW coal fired powr generation plant Chowgule port JSW port slowly pollution has started taking place.

== Agriculture ==
The terrain is very hilly, providing little scope for agriculture. Nevertheless, it is densely shaded by mango, coconut, cashew nut, jackfruit and various other trees.

Being in the Konkan region, Saitavda is home to the world-famous Alphonso (Hapoos) mango. Another equally delicious variety that can be found here is the Payri mango. It is the second largest commercial variety of mango in the Konkan region, and can sometimes be more expensive than the Hapoos.

== Festivals ==
As the population is predominantly Muslim, the two main festivals celebrated here are Eid al Fitr and Eid al Adha.

Other festivals like Diwali, Holi, Ganapati, etc. are celebrated amongst the Hindus.

== Getting there ==
- By Train:

Regular, daily express trains between Mumbai and Ratnagiri are operated by Konkan Railways. From Ratnagiri station, take one of the many private vehicles (popularly known as trax or seaters) that ply between Ratnagiri and Saitavda.

- By Bus:

State-owned and private buses operate regular services from Mumbai to Ratnagiri. From Ratnagiri, take one of the many private vehicles (popularly known as trax or seaters) that ply between Ratnagiri and Saitavda.
