= Brahmanwad =

Village in Maharashtra

- Village
- Country: India
- State: Maharashtra

Brahmanwad is a small village in Ratnagiri district, Maharashtra state in Western India. The 2011 Census of India recorded a total of 1,158 residents in the village. Brahmanwad's geographical area is 350 hectares (860 acres).
