= Kule, Sangameshwar =

Village in Maharashtra, India

Kule
- Village
- Location in Maharashtra, India
- Coordinates: 17.11°N 73.33°E
- Country: India
- State: Maharashtra
- District: Ratnagiri
- Population (2015): 465

Languages Marathi
  - Official: Marathi
- Time zone: UTC+5:30 (IST)
- PIN: 415611
- Telephone code: 02354
- Vehicle registration: MH-08

Kule is a small village in the Raigad, Sangameshwar tehsil of Ratnagiri district.

== Overview ==
The nearest bus stand is Sangameshwar S.T. Stand (M.S.R.T.C.) approximately 18 kilometers away.
