= Battle of Dabul =

1508 battle between Portuguese Empire and Sultanate of Bijapur

- Part of the Adil Shahi–Portuguese conflicts
Date	29 December 1508
Location	Dabul (now Dabhol, India)
Result	Portuguese victory

Belligerents
Portuguese Empire	Sultanate of Bijapur

Commanders and leaders
Francisco de Almeida, Nuno Vaz Pereira	Unknown

Strength
19 ships 1,900 men	4 merchant ships from Gujarat; 6,000 men

Casualties and losses
Negligible	All ships destroyed Unknown number of men killed, captured and wounded

The Battle of Dabul was a retaliatory attack by the forces of the Viceroy of Portuguese India, Francisco de Almeida, upon the port city of Dabul (now Dabhol) in the Sultanate of Bijapur. It occurred on 29 December 1508, in retaliation for attacking the Portuguese armada en route to the Battle of Diu. Despite the presence of a double wooden wall and a ditch, the Portuguese using both an artillery bombardment and a pincer movement of armed soldiers, "slammed into the town. What followed was a black day in the history of European conquest that would leave the Portuguese cursed on Indian soil." The conquerors were merciless--all living creatures (male, female, old, young, human or animal) were slaughtered then the city set on fire to burn alive those who had managed to hide in secret. The Portuguese departed on January 5, 1509. "This massacre stood beside [Vasco de] Gama's destruction of [the Hajj pilgrim ship] the Miri as an unforgiven act that lingered long in the memory".
