= Janavale =

Coordinates: 17.499°N 73.278°E

Janavale is a census town in Guhagar taluka. It is about 2 km from Shringartali which is the capital of Guhagar. There are three primary schools in town.

== Associated data ==
The other associated data about Janavale town including its map, population, commute services and nearby villages is available in the data given in reference.
