= Kelane (village) =

Village in Maharashtra

- Village
- Interactive map of Kelane
- Country: India
- State: Maharashtra

Area
  - Total: 796 km^{2} (307 sq mi)

Population
  - Total: 701

Kelane is a small village in Khed, in Ratnagiri district, Maharashtra State in India.
