= Ghulam Parkar =

Indian international cricketer (born 1955)

Personal information
- Full name: Ghulam Ahmed Hasan Mohammed Parkar
- Born: 25 October 1955 (age 71); Kalusta, Maharashtra, India
- Batting: Right-handed
- Bowling: Right-arm medium

International information
- National side: India
- Only Test (cap 157): 10 June 1982 v England
- ODI debut (cap 41): 2 June 1982 v England
- Last ODI: 31 October 1984 v Pakistan

Career statistics
Competition	Test	ODI	FC	LA
Matches	1	10	66	41
Runs scored	7	165	4,167	1,168
Batting average	3.50	18.33	42.09	33.37
100s/50s	0/0	0/0	11/20	1/6
Top score	6	42	170*	113
Catches/stumpings	1/–	4/–	47/1	16/–
Medal record
Men's Cricket
Representing India
ACC Asia Cup
Winner	1984 United Arab Emirates
- Source: ESPNcricinfo, 16 April 2026

Ghulam Ahmed Hasan Mohammed Parkar (born 25 October 1955) is a former Indian international cricketer who played in one Test match and 10 One Day Internationals between 1982 and 1984. He was part of the Indian squad which won the 1984 Asia Cup

The first Indian international cricketer with four initials, Ghulam Parkar earned renown from a very young age as a fielder of superlative quality. While he usually manned cover, he was often a part of Ashok Mankad's strategy: Mankad played him deceptively back at mid-on, and if the unsuspecting batsman attempted an extra run, Parkar swooped down on the ball and pulled off run outs with his famous direct hits – a skill he had apparently picked up due to years of playing pittu.

Parkar went on the England tour, playing the debut of his career. Opening batting with Sunil Gavaskar. He also played 10 ODIs between 1982 and 1984–85, scoring 165 runs at 18. His finest effort came at Guwahati in 1982–83, when he top-scored with 42 in a total of 178 for 7 against a rampant West Indies.

He also scored 4,167 First-Class runs at 42. He peaked in 1980–81, with 59 and 146 in the semi-final and 121 in the final. The following season he had a run of 148*, 40, 156, 84, 68 in Ranji Trophy; the 156 came in a 421-run opening stand with Gavaskar against Bengal.

In England Ghulam scored 433 runs at 36 with 146 against Yorkshire and 92 against MCC. Back home he slammed 77 against the touring West Indians. He never actually lost form (after the first two seasons his average never dipped below the 35-mark), but still quit at 30.

His brother Zulfiqar kept wickets for Bombay, often playing alongside Ghulam.

== Domestic career ==
He scored 4,167 first-class runs at a batting average of 42 runs per innings. He was famously involved in a 421-run opening partnership against Bengal in the 1981–82 quarter-final. This came after an unbeaten 148 in the same season

== International career ==
Parkar went on the England tour, playing the only Test of his career. Opening the batting with Sunil Gavaskar. He also played 10 ODIs between 1982 and 1984. His finest effort came at Guwahati in 1982–83, when he top-scored with 42 in a total of 178 for 7 against a rampant West Indies.

== See also ==
- Zulfiqar Ahmed Hasan Parkar, brother
