= Kelane (bread) =

Flat bread with varied fillings from Kurdistan

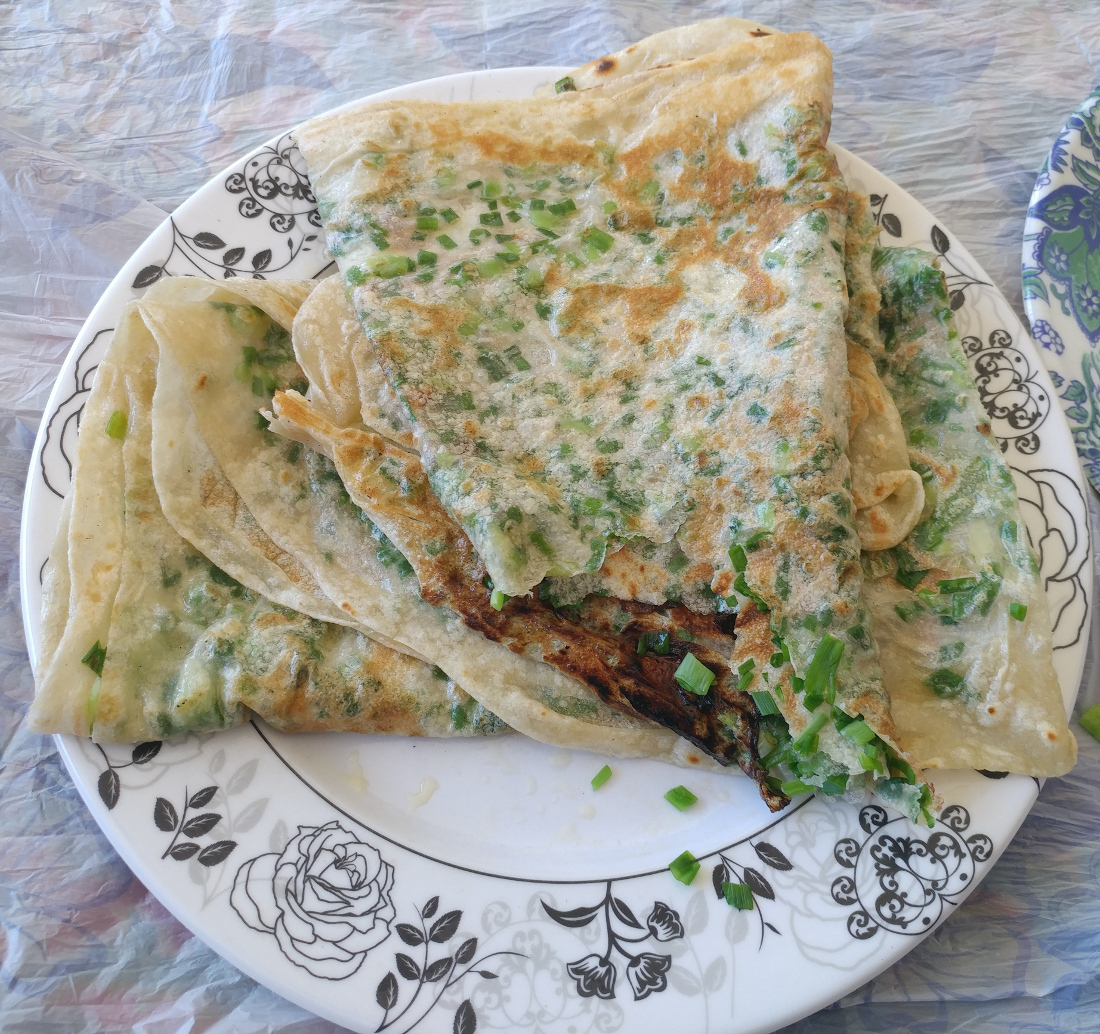
- Kelane
- Region or state: (Kurdistan Region) Kurdistan
- Main ingredients: Wheat flour, Sour dough, Scallion

Kelane or Kelaneh (Kurdish: کەلانە, romanized: Kelane), also known as Kalana by some, is known primarily for being a type of bread or pastry, but the term encompasses a full meal that is particular to the Avroman region of Kurdistan. In spring, the bread is filled with wheat flour and a kind of honeysuckle called ivy, while in other seasons onions are the filling. Traditionally this flatbread is filled with scallion (or chives or wild garlic) and made them a smaller size to fit in a frying pan on a home stove compared to the convex metal griddle over an open fire (saj).

== See also ==
- Bolani
