= Lanja =

- Town
- Location in Maharashtra, India
- Coordinates: 16.85°N 73.55°E
- Country: India
- State: Maharashtra
- District: Ratnagiri
- Elevation: 166 m (545 ft)

Population (2011)
  - Total: 25,000
- Demonym: Lanjekar

Languages
  - Official: Marathi
- Time zone: UTC+5:30 (IST)
- Postal code: 416701
- Vehicle registration: Mh 08

Lanja is a town located in Maharashtra in India. Lanja is a taluka.

== Geography ==
Lanja is a small town located at 16.85°N 73.55°E. It has an average elevation of 166 metres (544 feet). It's a Taluka head in Ratnagiri district. The National highway, popularly known as Mumbai-Goa Highway, passes through it. Nearest rail head is Adavali on the Konkan railway, which is around 15 km away.

== History ==
From the time of the Peshva up to 1 August 1879, when Vengurle was made a sub-division, Lanja was the headquarters of a petty division of Rajapur.

In the village is the grave of a Muhammedan saint named Syed Chand Bukhari Ali Faqir, said to have lived about five hundred years ago. Yearly, at the Magh (January–February) full moon, an Urus is held, when the tomb is, with ceremonies and prayers, covered with a cloth and sprinkled with powdered sandalwood. The fair is still largely attended (1960) by people of different communities from Lanja and the neighbouring villages. Shopkeepers come from Rajapur and open temporary booths at which, for about a month, coarse country and imported cloth and miscellaneous articles are sold. There is also a domed tomb near the village with no more definite history than that it marks the grave of a princess who died on a journey.

== Demographics ==
As of 2001 India census, Lanja had a population of 237000. Males constitute 51% of the population and females 49%. Lanja has an average literacy rate of 73%, higher than the national average of 59.5%: male literacy is 78%, and female literacy is 69%. In Lanja, 14% of the population is under 6 years of age.
