= Chiplun taluka =

Taluka in Ratnagiri, Maharashtra, India

Chiplun taluka is a taluka in Ratnagiri district of Maharashtra, India. As per Census 2011, there are 2 towns and 165 villages within Chiplun Taluka.

== Ratnagiri district ==
The taluka is one of nine talukas in Ratnagiri district, the others being Ratnagiri, Rajapur, Lanja, Sangmeshwar Guhagar, Khed, Dapoli and Mandangad.

== Tourist attractions ==
Vashishti River, Lord Parashurama Temple and Gowalkot fort are the main attractions of Chiplun. Sawatsada Waterfalls, Koyna Dam, Nehru Smriti Udyan, Nageshwar Temple, etc. are few other tourist spots in Chiplun taluka. Famous Math of Shree Swami Samarth and Shivsrushti is at Dervan Village.

== See also ==
- Chiplun
- Konkan
- Konkan division
- Western Ghats
- Chiplun Instagram Account
