= Dabhol =

Town in Maharashtra, India

Dabhol Dabul
- Seaport town
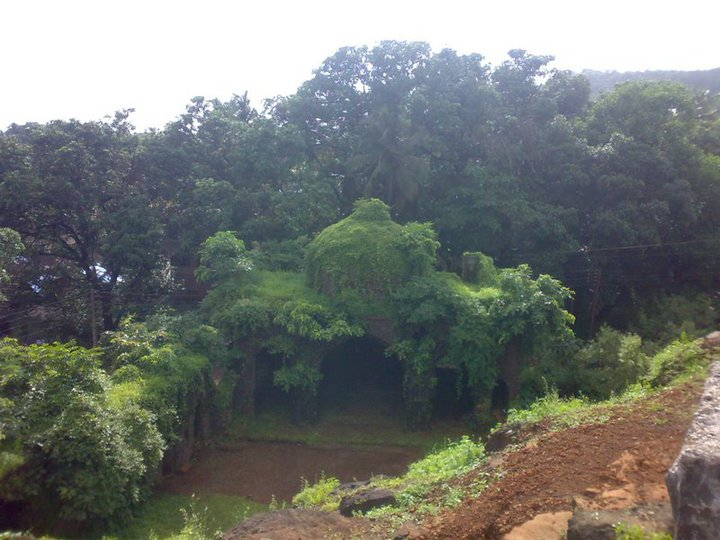
- View of a mosque from the 16th century near the main graveyard

- Location in Maharashtra, India Dabhol; Dabul (India)
- Country: India
- State: Maharashtra
- Division: Konkan
- District: Ratnagiri
- Taluka: Dapoli

Government
  - Sarpanch: Mrs Rukaya Liyakat Sunge

Languages
  - Official: Konkani, Marathi, Urdu, Hindi, English
- Time zone: UTC+5:30 (IST)
- PIN: 415710
- Telephone code: 02356
- Climate: humid (Köppen)

Dabhol (Marathi pronunciation: [d̪aːbʱoɭ]), also known as Dabul, is a small seaport town in the Ratnagiri district of Maharashtra in India. It is located on the northern and southern sides of the Vashishti River that later flows by the town of Chiplun. The Dabhol LNG power plant that had been set up by Enron is located on the southern side of Dabhol, between the villages of Veldur and Ranavi.

== History ==
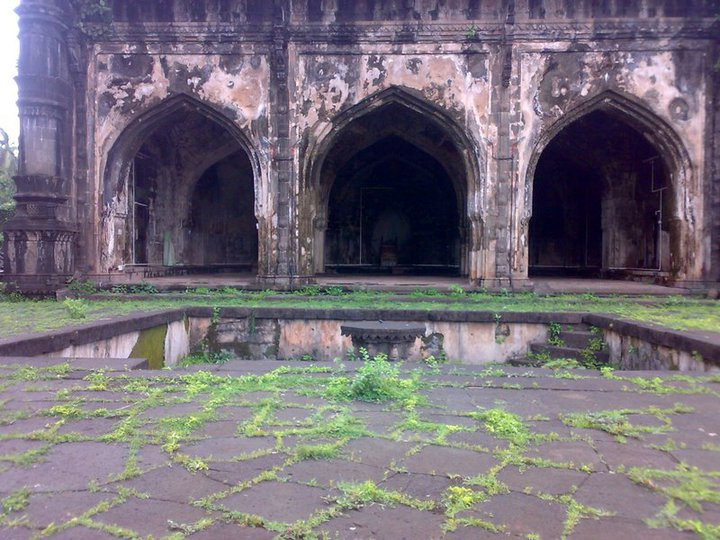
View of a very old mosque (Shahi Masjid) near the Dabhol Port, built in the regime of Adil Shah

The Russian traveller Afanasy Nikitin, who visited India from 1468 to 1474, found Dabhol as a large town and extensive seaport. The horses from Mysore, Arabia, Khorasan and Nighostan were brought here for trade. Dabhol had links with all major ports from India to Ethiopia.

In the 15th and 16th centuries, Dabul was an opulent Muslim trade centre, first under the Bahmani, later under the Badar sultans of Bijapur. As the port with most convenient access to the Bahmani sultanate's capital at Bidar, Dabul's fortunes ascended quickly with that dynasty. At its height, it was arguably the most important port between Chaul and Goa. (Note: For a brief discussion of the decline of the port of Dabul, see Dames (1918: p.164) and Nairne (1873).)

It was exactly the prominence of Dabul as a Muslim trade centre and port that led it to be bombarded, sacked and razed by a Portuguese expeditionary force (Battle of Dabul) under Francisco de Almeida in December, 1508, in a prelude to the famous Battle of Diu. Although the city's fort was not taken, it was only the first of several times, in the course of the next few decades, that the Portuguese tried to destroy Dabul. By the time of the last recorded attack, in 1571, the Governor of Dabhul was Khwaja Ali Shirazi. The battle led to killing 150 men at Dabhol.

The break-up of the Bahmani state into several smaller Deccan sultanates had accelerated Dabul's decline. As new capitals for these statelets were erected, Dabul's geographic position was no longer as fortuitous as it had been before, and alternative, more convenient ports were cultivated. In the course of the 16th century, a lot of commerce was redirected away from Dabul and towards the rising new port of Rajapur further south.

The Dabhol port boasts of centuries-old history. Dabhol was of great importance in the 14th, 15th and 16th centuries. It used to be the principal port of southern Konkani region, carrying on trade with ports in the Mediterranean Sea, the Red Sea and the Persian Gulf. During the 13th to 15th centuries, this port was ruled by the Bahmani dynasty and was known as Mustafabad. Later on it was Hamjabad, and then it was Dabhol.

Dabul was conquered by Shivaji around 1660 CE and annexed to the new Maratha kingdom. After being captured by Chhatrapati Shivaji Maharaj, it was passed on to Chhatrapati Sambhaji Maharaj who gave it to Khando Ballal Chitnis as a reward for saving his life while drowning in a river in Goa. The Dabhol Vatan even today, is claimed by the descendants of the Satara Chitnis family, although some of the descendants of the Shirke family argue that they should own it.

== See also ==
- Konkan division
  - Furus
- Konkani Muslims
- List of villages in Dapoli taluka
- Western Ghats
