= Khed, Ratnagiri =

Khed
- Town
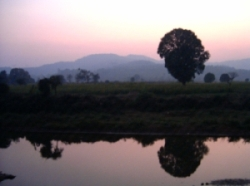
- Naringi River, which flows through Khed

- Location in Maharashtra, India Khed (India)
- Coordinates: 17°43′04″N 73°23′38″E
- Country: India
- State: Maharashtra
- Division: Konkan
- District: Ratnagiri
- Taluka: Khed
- Elevation: 25 m (82 ft)

Population (2011)
  - Total: 16,892
- Demonym: Khedkar

Languages
  - Official: Marathi
- Time zone: UTC+5:30 (IST)
- PIN: 415709
- Sex ratio: 0.96 ♂/♀
- Literacy: 80%
- Khed is situated on Mumbai–Goa National Highway No. 66

Khed (Pronunciation: [kʰeːɖ]) is a municipal council in the Ratnagiri district of the state of Maharashtra, India. Khed town is situated on the National Highway 66 between Mumbai and Goa. Khed is the headquarters of Khed taluka which connects the district administration with the village administration.

== Geography ==
Khed is located at 17.72°N 73.38°E. It has an average elevation of 25 m (82 ft). Alphonso mangoes are grown in the area around the town. Khed lies between Kashedi Ghat and Bhoste Ghat. The region surrounding the town is mostly mountainous. The Jagbudi River is a large river located in the area. The Raghuveer ghat is mainly use for picnic spots.

== Culture ==
Raj Yuva Mahostav & JCI festival (Mela) is also organized in Khed once every year. Shimaga (Holi) and Ganapati are Konkan's favorite festivals. Gauri-Ganpati festival is celebrated with cheer and enthusiasm all over the taluka. Ram Navmi festival is celebrated in Laxmi Narayan Temple. It is celebrated for 10 days starting from Gudi Padva. Ganesh Chaturthi is largely and joyfully celebrated in the city. One of the most important attractions of Khed is the annual rally conducted on the occasion of Shiv Jayanti. Hazrat Jalal Shah baba Dargah (Shrine) - The shrine of Hazrat Jalal Shah, is situated in the suburb of Khed along the NH 66 highway, near Khed Railway Station, on the edge of Veral village. The Dargah includes a modest courtyard, a multi purpose space, and an ablution area for devotees. The annual Urs of Dargah, a significant event, is celebrated with deep reverence between the 15th to 20th of Sha'ban (Islamic calendar), attracting numerous visitors from the surrounding regions. Vade-Mutton is a popular dish in Khed. The staple diet is rice and fish. Ghavane is one of the main dishes in the menu which prepared by the rice flour, eaten as Breakfast. Also, Monga is a well-known food item called as "Popati" in north Konkan.

== Demographics ==
The 2001 Indian census reported that Khed had a population of 13,813. Males constituted 49% of the population and females 51%. Khed had an average literacy rate of 97%, which was higher than the national average of 69.5%. The literacy rate among males was 98%, and among females, it was 96%.

In the 2011 Indian census, the town of Khed listed 15,249 inhabitants.

== Industry ==
Several factories [that produce] chemicals and pharmaceuticals are located in Khed. Furthermore, the Maharashtra Industrial Development Corporation (MIDC) has developed the Lote-Parshuram industrial area in Khed.

== Transport ==
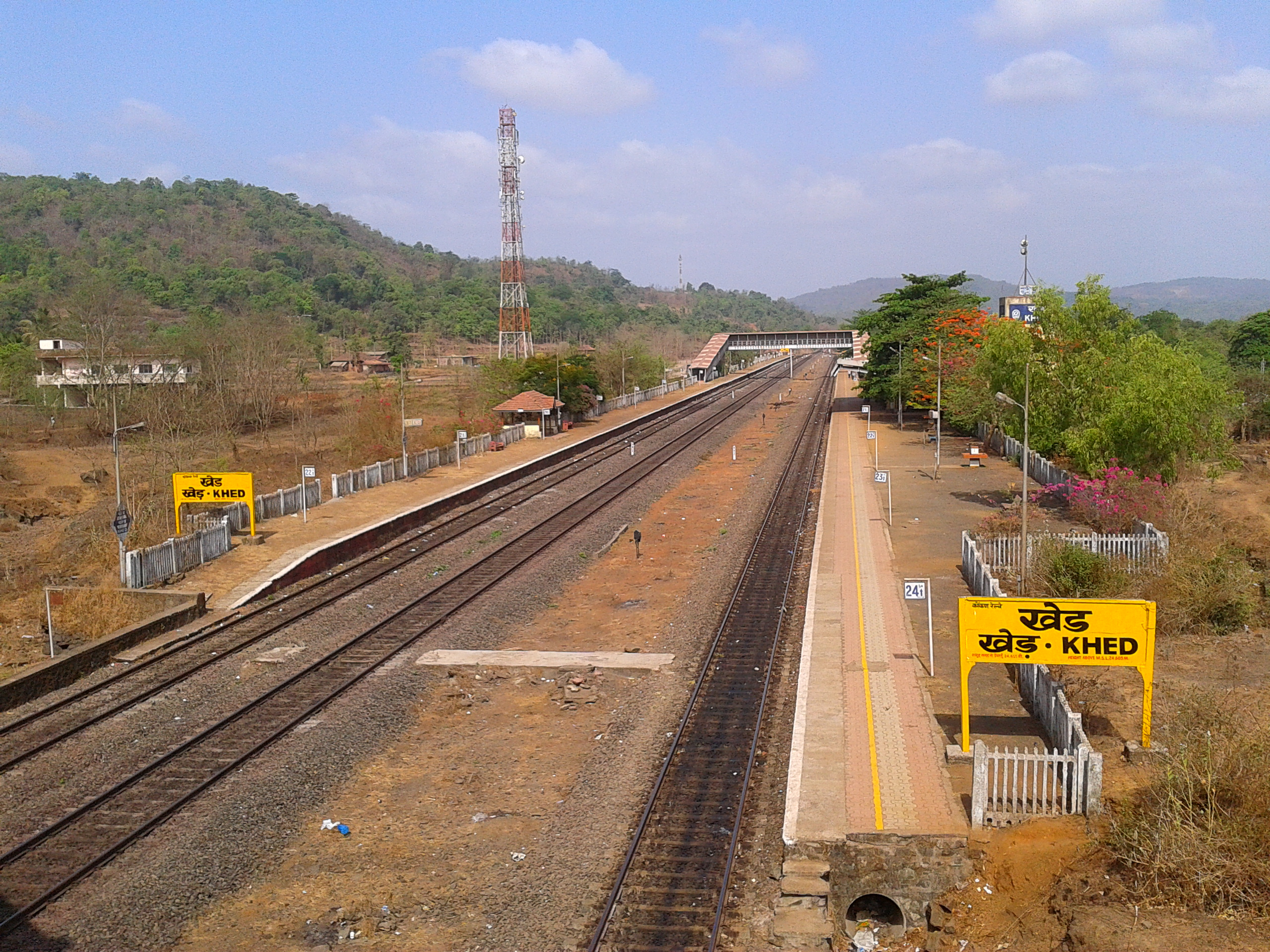
Khed Railway Station

Khed lies off National Highway NH-66, popularly known as Mumbai-Goa Highway, which connects Khed with cities like Mangalore, Panaji, Madgaon, Karwar and Udupi. The Bharna Naka – Khed road, part of state highway SH-106, connects NH-66 to the town of Khed. Khed has a railway station on the Konkan Railway line and a Maharashtra State Road Transport Corporation (MSRTC) bus station connecting Khed taluka to major cities in Maharashtra. Khed railway station connects three talukas (Dapoli, Mandangad, and Khed) to the railway map of India.

== Tourism ==
Kalki devi temple is one of the most visited sites by devotees.

Forts(killa), khed is surrounded by the Western Ghats at east and has dapoli taluka at west. Khed taluka has total six forts located nearby .The fort, built during the era of chhatrapati shivaji maharaj are

1. Rasalgad(approximately 15 km east)

2. Mahipatgad(approximately 24.5 km east)

3. Sumargad(approximately 18 km east)

4. Mahimandangad(approximately 33 km northeast) Coordinates=17.7111159N,73.6097912E

5. palgad(approximately 24 km northwest)

6. Ramgad(approximately 25 km northwest) Coordinates=17.814536N,73.347910E

Mahipatgad, Sumargad, Rasalgad are famous for its range Trek among the trekker, with the beautiful mountain clips, valleys, jungle and Sahyadri Tiger Reserve.

7. Caves - Just a few steps walking distance from the Khed Bus Station towards L.P. School and caves on the hills.

== Education ==
Khed has many English, Urdu, and Marathi medium schools and colleges:

- M.I.B Girl's High School And Junior College.
- Sriman Chandulal Sheth High School & Jr.College.
- Navabharat High School & Junior College, Bharne.
- L. P. English School & Junior College.
- Haji SM Mukadam High school and Junior College.
- L. T. T. English Medium School & Junior College.
- M. I. Hajwani English Medium School & Junior College.
- Rotary English Medium School, DELHI AFFILIATED{CBSE}
- Shiv Shankar Madhyamik Vidyalaya & Jr. College, Kulwandi.
- Dnyandeep Vidya Mandir, Bhadgaon.
- Vishwakarma Sahajeevan Institute of Management.
- New English Junior College of Aambavali.
- Yogita Dental College Khed.
- S.I.Junior college, furus, khed.
- New English school, Dayal, Khed.
- I.C.S College Khed.
- Ideal English school Furus.
- New English school, hedali saveni
- Z.P.School hedali

== Notable people ==
- Dawood Ibrahim – fugitive gangster and terrorist, whose ancestral village is Mumbake in Khed taluka.

== See also ==
- Saitavde
- Tisangi

Khed (KHED)
Next 'Small' station towards Mumbai: Diwankhauti	Konkan Railway : Railway (India) 'Distance from Mumbai (CST) = 0275 km	Next 'Small' station from Mumbai: Anjani
Next 'Main' station towards Mumbai: Mangaon	Konkan Railway : Railway (India)	Next 'Main' station from Mumbai: Chiplun
Next 'Main' station towards Mumbai: Mangaon	Konkan Railway : Railway (India)	Next 'Main' station from Mumbai: Chiplun
