= Khed taluka, Ratnagiri =

Khed taluka, Ratnagiri is a taluka in Ratnagiri district of Maharashtra an Indian state.

== Ratnagiri district ==
There are nine talukas in Ratnagiri district, they are Ratnagiri, Rajapur, Lanja, Sangmeshwar, Chiplun, Guhagar, Khed taluka, Dapoli and Mandangad.
