= Ratnagiri district =

- District of Maharashtra
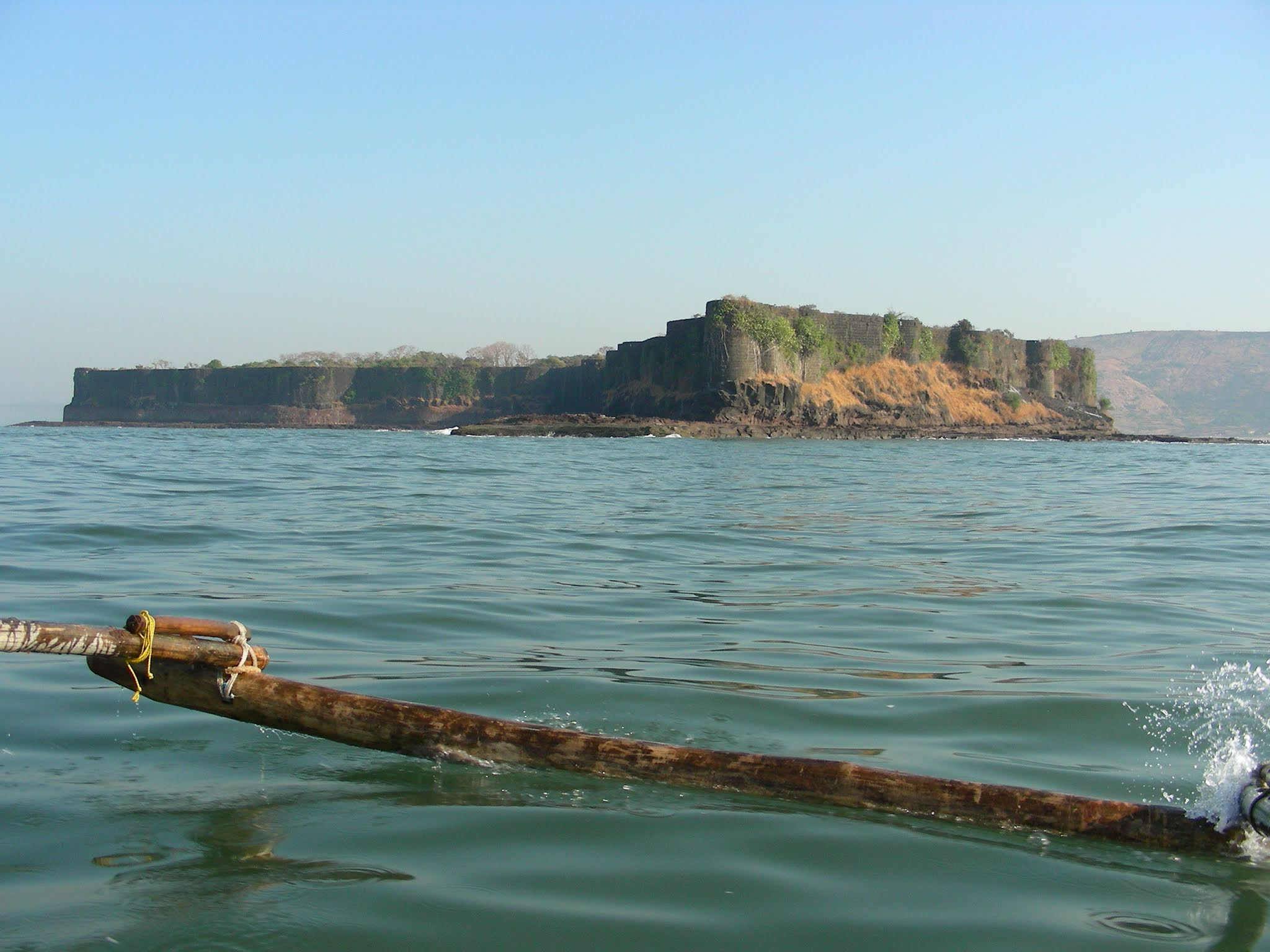
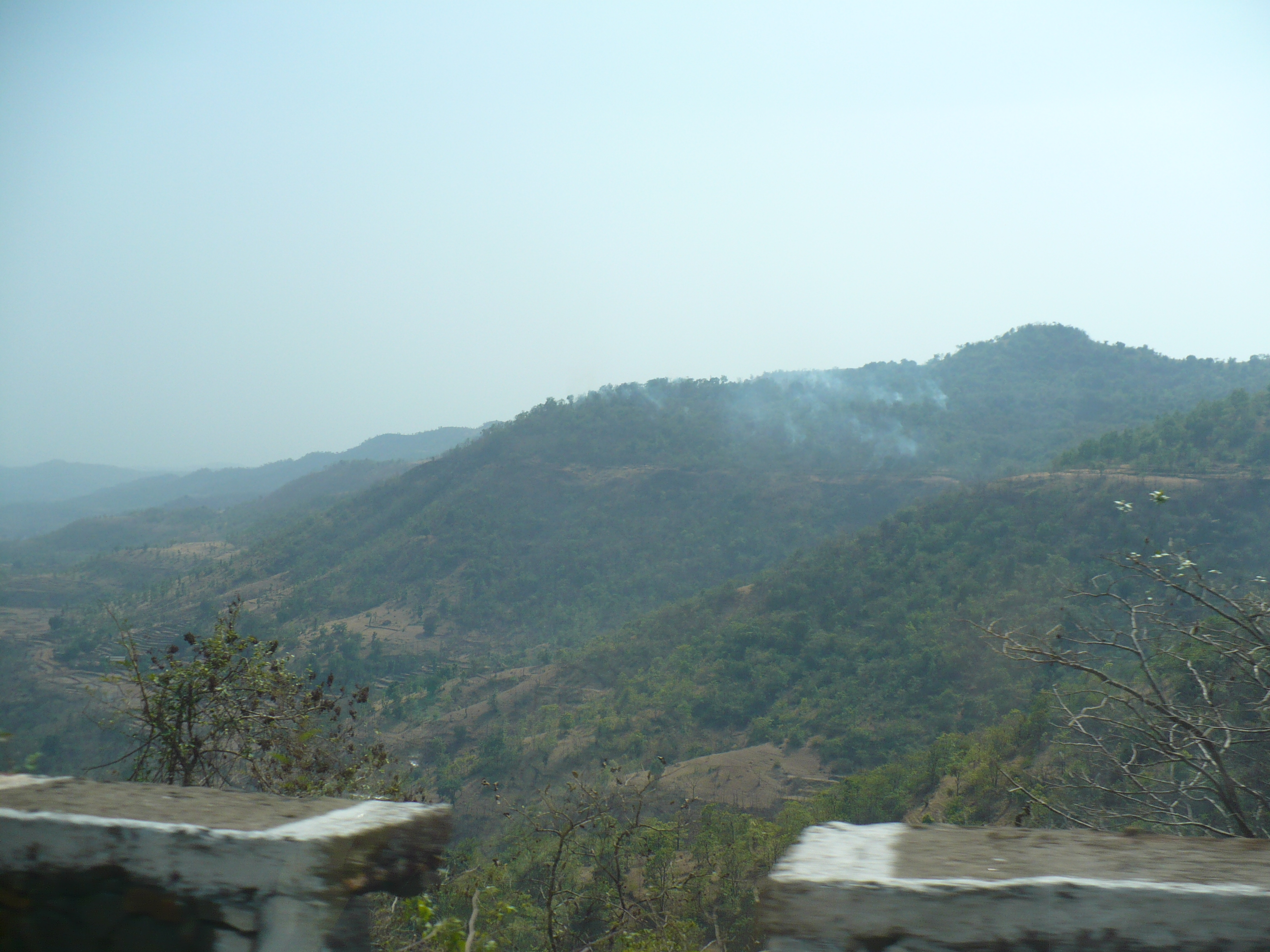
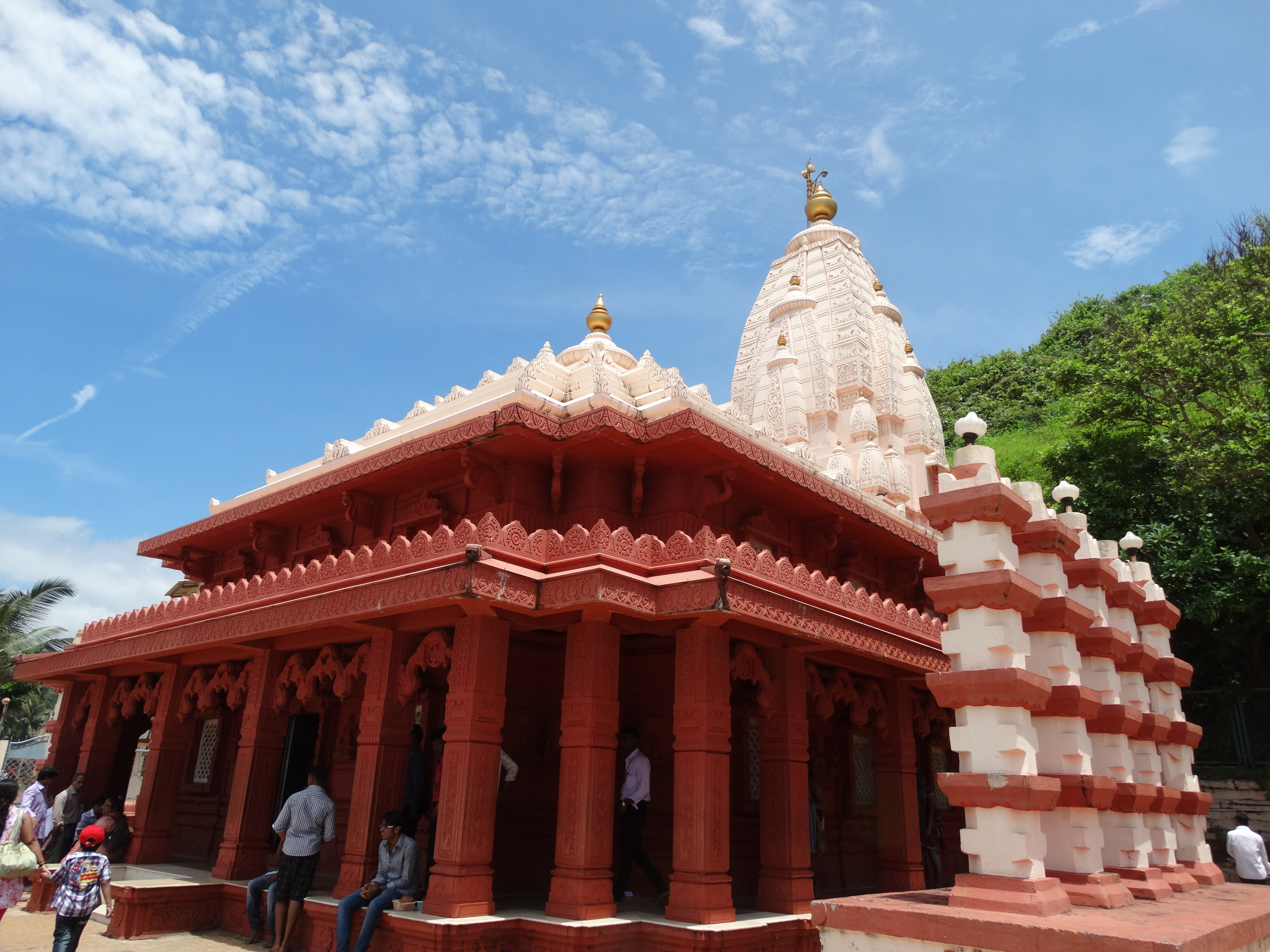
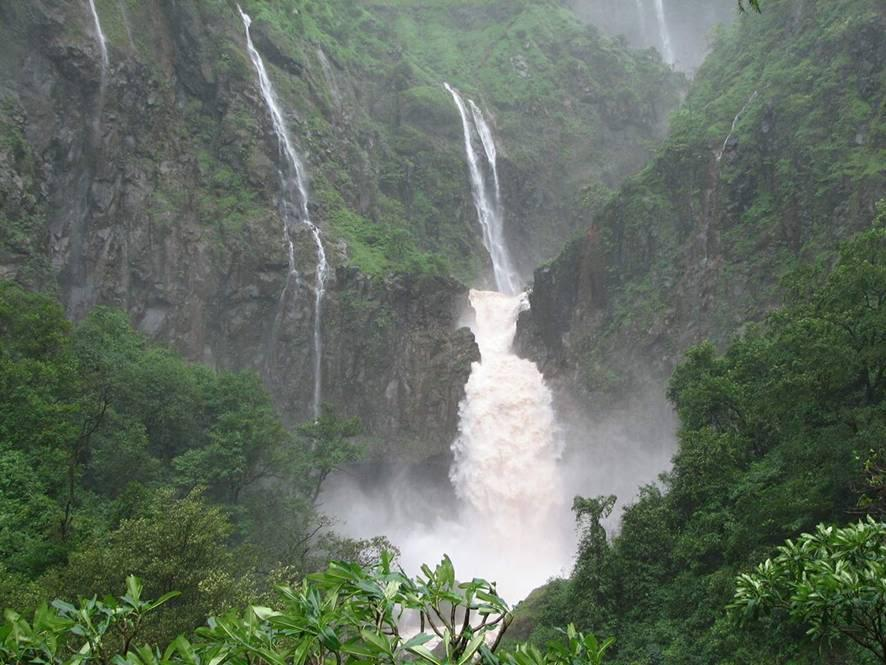
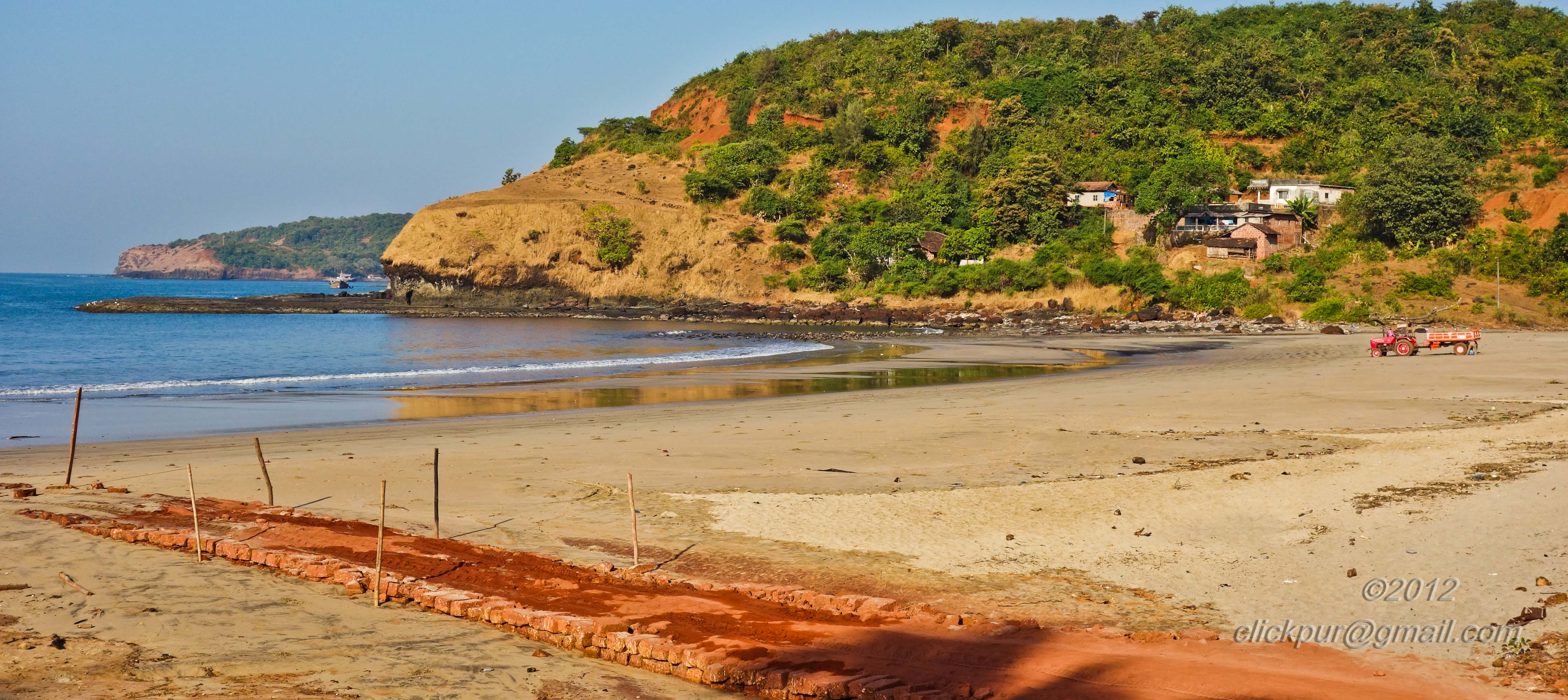
- View of Suvarnadurg Fort from the sea, hills near Chiplun, Marleshwar Waterfalls, Velneshwar beach near Ratnagiri, Ganesha temple at Ganpatipule

- Location in Maharashtra
- Country: India
- State: Maharashtra
- Division: Konkan
- Headquarters: Ratnagiri
- Tehsils: 1. Mandangad, 2. Dapoli, 3. Khed, 4. Chiplun, 5. Guhagar, 6. Sangameshwar, 7. Ratnagiri, 8. Lanja, 9. Rajapur

Government
  - Body: Ratnagiri Zilla Parishad
  - Guardian Minister: Shri Uday Samant (Cabinet Minister MH)
  - President Z. P. Ratnagiri: NA
  - District Collector: M Devender Singh (IAS)
  - CEO Z. P. Ratnagiri: Kirti Kiran Pujar (IAS)
  - MPs: Shri Narayan Rane (Ratnagiri–Sindhudurg); Shri Sunil Tatkare(Raigad)

Area
  - Total: 8,208 km^{2} (3,169 sq mi)

Population (2011)
  - Total: 1,615,069
  - Density: 196.8/km^{2} (509.6/sq mi)

Demographics
  - Literacy: 82.18%
- Time zone: UTC+05:30 (IST)
- Major highways: NH-66, NH-204
- Website: ratnagiri.nic.in

Ratnagiri district (Marathi pronunciation: [ɾət̪n̪aːɡiɾiː]) is a district in the state of Maharashtra, India. The administrative headquarter of the district is located in the town of Ratnagiri. The district is 11.34% urban. The district is bounded by the Arabian Sea to the west, Sindhudurg district to the south, Raigad district to the north and Satara, Sangli and Kolhapur districts to the east. This district is part of Konkan division.

== Guardian Minister ==
Guardian Minister Jalna
- पालकमंत्री जालना
- Emblem of India
- Style: The Honourable
- Appointer: Chief Minister of Maharashtra
- Term length: 5 years / No time limit
- Website: http://http:

== History ==
From pre-Christian times until 1312, the area – like the entire region – was ruled by various Buddhist and Hindu rulers. The first state known by name was the Mauryan Empire, the last non-Muslim dynasty was the Yadavas of Devagiri. After decades of military clashes with Muslim rulers in northern India, the region was occupied by Muslim armies between 1312 and 1470. From 1500 on there was fierce fighting for rule on the coast between the Muslim rulers and the Portuguese. After that, various Muslim dynasties ruled until 1658 (Sultanate of Delhi, Bahmani, Deccan Sultanates and the Mughals). From 1658, most of the area became part of the Maratha Empire. After the defeat of the Marathas against the British in 1818, Ratnagiri area became an administrative region of the Bombay Presidency. With the independence of India in 1947 and the reorganization of the country, it became part of the new Bombay State in 1950. In 1948 the district grew through the incorporation of the Sawantwadi princely state. In 1960, Bombay State was divided and the area became part of the newly created state of Maharashtra. In 1981 the district was divided and the southern part of the district became Sindhudurg district.

== Geography ==
An outstanding feature of the geography of the district is its uneven or hill landscape, with about 45% of the area covered by hills.The Sahyadri hill range runs for 180 km.

== Administrative divisions ==
=== Talukas ===
- Mandangad
- Dapoli
- Khed
- Guhagar
- Chiplun
- Ratnagiri
- Sangmeshwar
- Lanja
- Rajapur

=== Nagar palikas ===
- Ratnagiri
- Chiplun
- Rajapur
- Khed

=== Nagar panchayats ===
- Devrukh (Sangmeshwar Taluka)
- Dapoli
- Guhagar
- Lanja
- Mandangad

=== Proposed nagar palika ===
- Devrukh

=== Proposed nagar panchayats ===
- Jalgaon
- Kule
- Satawali
- Waghivane

=== Cities, towns and villages ===
- Brahmanwad
- Chiplun
- Dapoli
- Devrukh
- Guhagar
- Jalgaon
- Kelane
- Khed
- Kondgaon
- Kule
- Kumbhave
- Lanja
- Mandangad
- Rajapur
- Ratnagiri
- Satawali
- Umberghar
- Waghivane

== Demographics ==
Historical population
Year	Pop.	±% p.a.
1901	871,866	—
1911	893,944	+0.25%
1921	856,032	−0.43%
1931	964,558	+1.20%
1941	1,022,816	+0.59%
1951	1,076,080	+0.51%
1961	1,146,243	+0.63%
1971	1,278,742	+1.10%
1981	1,379,655	+0.76%
1991	1,544,057	+1.13%
2001	1,696,777	+0.95%
2011	1,615,069	−0.49%

Religions in Ratnagiri district (2011)
Religion	Percent
Hinduism	80.94%
Islam	11.59%
Buddhism	7.03%
Other or not stated	0.44%

According to the 2011 census Ratnagiri district has a population of 1,615,069, roughly equal to the nation of Guinea-Bissau or the US state of Idaho. This gives it a ranking of 311th in India (out of a total of 640). The district has a population density of 196 inhabitants per square kilometre (510/sq mi) . Its population growth rate over the decade 2001-2011 was -4.96%. Ratnagiri has a sex ratio of 1123 females for every 1000 males, and a literacy rate of 82.43%. 16.33% of the population lives in urban areas. Scheduled Castes and Scheduled Tribes make up 4.15% and 1.26% of the population respectively.

Languages in Ratnagiri district (2011)
1. Marathi (88.2%)
2. Urdu (7.36%)
3. Hindi (1.43%)
4. Konkani (1.14%)
5. Others (1.89%)

At the time of the 2011 Census of India, 88.18% of the population in the district spoke Marathi, 7.36% Urdu, 1.43% Hindi and 1.14% Konkani as their first language. Most people speak distinct coastal dialects of Marathi.

== Notable people ==
Notable people from Ratnagiri include:

- Lokmanya Tilak
- B. R. Ambedkar
- Balasaheb Kher
- Dhondo Keshav Karve
- Vinoba Bhave
- George Coles (Kent cricketer)
- Swatantryaveer Savarkar was moved to Ratnagiri with his freedom of movement restricted to the boundary of the district and also refraining from politics.
- Govind Sakharam Sardesai
- R. P. Paranjpye
- Shakuntala Paranjpye
- Gopal Krishna Gokhale
- Rani Lakshmi Bai

== Current officers and public representatives ==
=== Members of Parliament ===
Member of Parliament	Political party	Lok Sabha constituency
Sunil Tatkare	Nationalist Congress Party	Raigad
Narayan Rane	Bharatiya Janata Party	Ratnagiri–Sindhudurg

=== Members of Legislative Assembly ===
Assembly constituency	Members of Legislative Assembly	Party
Dapoli	Yogesh Kadam	Shiv Sena
Guhagar	Bhaskar Jadhav	SS(UBT)
Chiplun	Shekhar Nikam	NCP
Ratnagiri	Uday Samant	SHS
Rajapur	Kiran Samant	Shiv Sena

=== Guardian Minister ===
Guardian Minister Ratnagiri
- पालकमंत्री रत्नागिरी
- Emblem of India

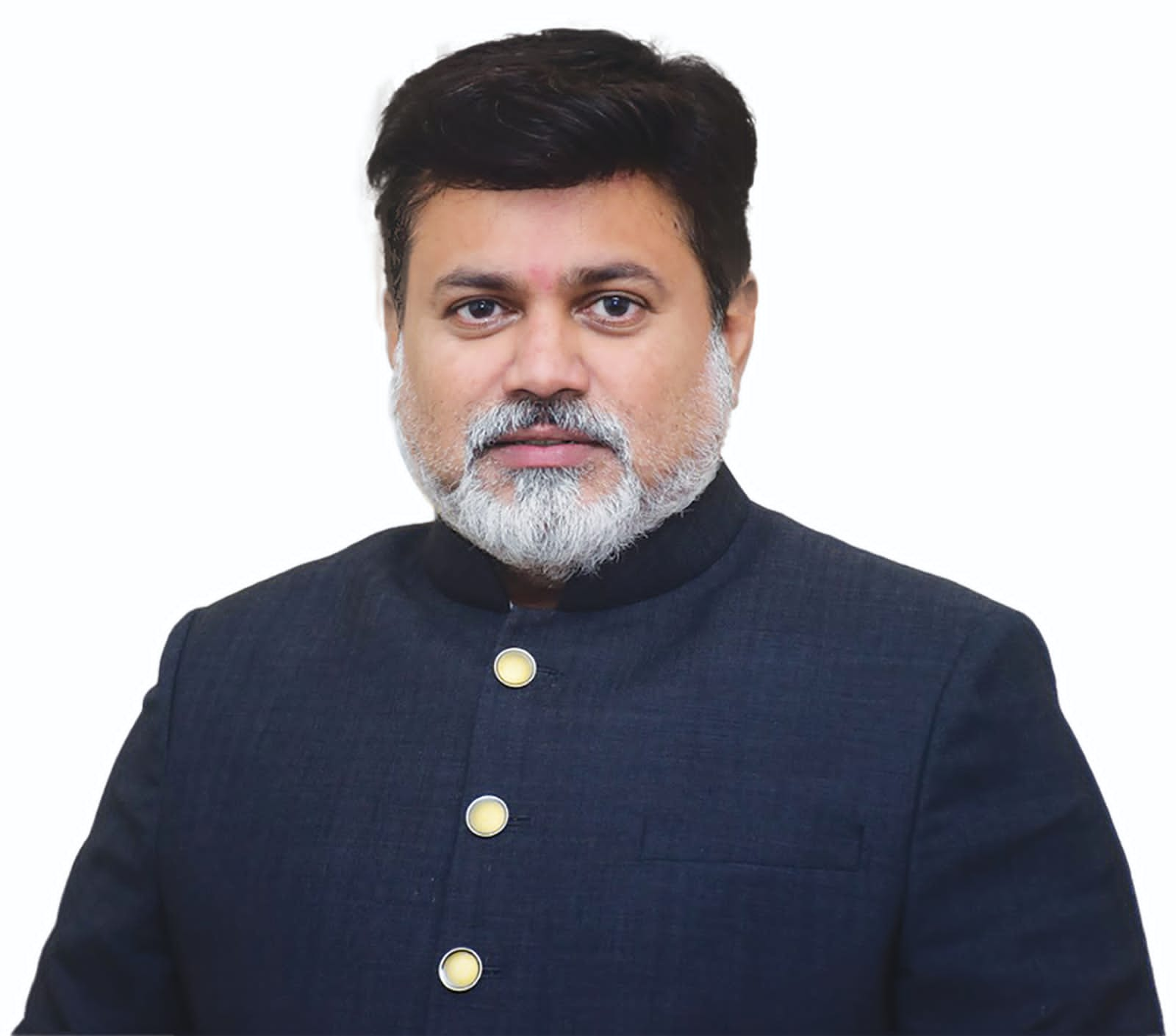
- Incumbent; Uday Samant since 24 September 2022
- Style: The Honourable
- Residence: Ratnagiri
- Appointer: Chief Minister of Maharashtra
- Term length: 5 years / No time limit
- Website: ratnagiri.gov.in/en/

==== List of Guardian Ministers ====
Name	Term of office
Ravindra Waikar	31 October 2014 - 8 November 2019
Anil Parab	9 January 2020 - 29 June 2022
Uday Samant	24 September 2022- Incumbent

=== District Magistrate/Collector ===
District Magistrate / Collector Ratnagiri
- जिल्हाधिकारी तथा जिल्हदंडाधिकरी रत्नागिरी
- Emblem of India
- Incumbent; Mr. Dr. B. N. Patil (IAS) since 2019
- Residence: At Ratnagiri district
- Appointer: Government of Maharashtra
- Term length: No time limit
- Website: ratnagiri.gov.in/en/

==== List of District Magistrate / Collector ====
Name	Term of office
Mr. Dr. B. N. Patil (IAS)	2019 – Incumbent

== Geographical indication ==
Sindhudurg and Ratnagiri Kokum was awarded the Geographical Indication (GI) status tag from the Geographical Indications Registry, under the Union Government of India, on 31 March 2016.

Sindhudurg Ratnagiri Mahakokum Sanstha from Malvan, proposed the GI registration of Sindhudurg & Ratnagiri Kokum. After filing the application in March 2014, the Kokum was granted the GI tag in 2016 by the Geographical Indication Registry in Chennai, making the name "Sindhudurg & Ratnagiri Kokum" exclusive to the Kokum grown in the region. It thus became the first Kokum variety from India and the 13th type of goods from Maharashtra to earn the GI tag.

The prestigious GI tag, awarded by the GI registry, certifies that a product possesses distinct qualities, adheres to traditional production methods, and has earned a reputation rooted in its geographical origin.

== See also ==
- Malvani people
- Sangameshwari

== Sources ==
- Greater Bombay District Gazetteer. Vol. 1 (E-book ed.). Government of Mahareshtra. 1986. Archived from the original on 27 February 2008.
