= Durga (disambiguation) =

Durga is a Hindu goddess.

Durga may also refer to:

== Film and television ==
- Durga (1974 film), an Indian Malayalam-language film
- Durgaa, 1985 Indian Hindi-language film, starring Rajesh Khanna
- Durga (1990 film), an Indian Tamil-language film
- Durga (2000 film) or Pottu Amman, Indian Telugu and Tamil film
- Durga (2002 film), an Indian Hindi-language film by J. D. Chakravarthy, starring Priyanka Upendra and Sayaji Shinde
- Durga (unreleased film), an unreleased Indian action film
- Durga – Mata Ki Chhaya, Indian television drama series
- Durga Sohay, a 2017 Indian Bengali-language family drama film
- Kahaani 2: Durga Rani Singh, a 2016 Indian Hindi-language mystery thriller film

== Music ==
- Durga (raga), a raga in Hindustani Classical music
- Durga Rising, a 1997 studio album by the artists Barb Jungr, Kuljit Bhamra and Russell Churney

== People ==
- Durga (surname), an Indian surname
- Durga Bahadur Rawat, Nepali politician
- Durga Bai Vyom (born 1973), Indian artist
- Durga Bhagwat (1910–2002), Indian scholar
- Durga Boro (born 1987), Indian professional footballer
- Durga Charan Banerjee (1898–1952), Indian jurist
- Durga Charan Mohanty (1912–1985), Odia Indian spiritual writer
- Durga Charan Nag (1846–1899), 19-century Hindu saint
- Durga Charan Panigrahi (born 1961), Indian mining scientist
- Durga Chew-Bose (born 1986), writer based in Brooklyn
- Durga Das Basu, Indian jurist and lawyer
- Durga Das Uikey (born 1963), Indian politician
- Durga Dass, Indian politician
- Durga Deulkar, Indian educationist and writer
- Durga Ghimire (born 1948), Nepali social worker
- Durga Jain, Indian social worker
- Durga Jasraj (born 1964), Indian original content producer
- Durga Keshar Khanal (born 1944), 1st Provincial Governor of Karnali Pradesh
- Durga Khote (1905–1991), Indian actress
- Durga Krishna (born 1996), Indian actress and dancer
- Durga Kumari B.K., Nepali politician
- Durga Lal (1948–1990), Indian Kathak dancer
- Durga Lal Shrestha (born 1937), Nepali poet
- Durga Malla (1913–1944), Indian freedom fighter
- Durga McBroom (born 1962), American singer and actress
- Durga Mohan Bhattacharyya (1899–1965), Indian scholar of Sanskrit
- Durga Mohan Das (1841–1897), Brahmo Samaj leader
- Durga Mukherjee (1933–2011), Indian cricketer
- Durga Paudel, Nepali politician
- Durga Prasad Bhattarai (born 1961), Nepali career diplomat
- Durga Prasad Dhar (1918–1975), Kashmiri politician
- Durga Prasad Yadav (born 1954), Indian politician
- Durga Rangila, Punjabi singer
- Durga Shakti Nagpal (born 1985), Indian bureaucrat
- Durga Shanker Mishra (born 1961), Indian politician
- Durga Sob (born 1966), Nepali feminist activist
- Durga Soren (1970–2009), Indian politician
- Durgavati Devi (Durga Bhabhi), an Indian Revolutionary and Member of HSRA
- Kanwar Durga Chand (1922–2000), leader of the Bharatiya Janata Party from Himachal Pradesh

=== Characters ===
- Durga the Hutt, a character in the Star Wars novels

== Places and institutions ==
- Durga, the Sanskrit word meaning "inaccessible place"
- Durga Bhabani, a village development committee in Nepal
- Durga College, a degree college located in Raipur, Chhattisgarh, India
- Durga Mandir (disambiguation), the name of several temples in India
- Durga Tekdi, a hill in Nigdi Pune
- Durga Sagar, the largest lake in southern Bangladesh
- Durga Vahini, the women's wing of the Vishva Hindu Parishad
- Durga Nagar Part-V
- Kammata Durga
- Durga Devi temple, Guhagar
- Channarayana Durga, a hill fort near Koratagere

== Other uses ==
- Durga Puja, an annual Hindu festival

== See also ==
- Durgesh (disambiguation)
- Durg, a city in Chhattisgarh, India
  - Durg (Lok Sabha constituency), parliament of India
  - Durg City (Vidhan Sabha constituency)
  - Durg Gramin (Vidhan Sabha constituency)
- Durg-class corvette, Indian Navy
- Kahaani, a 2012 Indian film with strong allusions to the Hindu goddess Durga
- Maharakshak: Devi, a 2015 Indian television series about the Hindu goddess Durga (Devi)
- Demus (surname)
