= Apte =

Apte is an Indian surname native to Maharashtra found in Chitpavan Brahmins belonging to the Kaushik gotra.

== Etmylogy ==
The surname may have come from the word "Apta", another name for Bauhinia racemosa. The Kuladevata (family deity) of this Clan is Shree Dev Vyadeshwar of Guhagar and Yogeshvari of Ambajogai, the Gramadevata (Village Deity) is Betal also known as Vetoba of Shiroda (Maharashtra).They are the followers of Taittiriya Shakha and Hiranyakeshi Sutra of the Yajurveda.

== Genealogy ==
Among the Chitpavan Brahmins the first to publish their own genealogical book were the Aptes; the family tree dates back to the 1400s. In the past several members of this Clan were Royalty of the Maratha Court

== Notable people ==
- Arvind Apte (1934–2014), Indian cricketer
- Babasaheb Apte (1903–1971), an early RSS pracharak
- Balavant Apte, Bal Apte or Balasaheb Apte (1939–2012), BJP politician
- Devdas Apte (born 1934), Indian politician
- Hari Narayan Apte (1864–1919), Marathi writer
- Madhav Apte (1932–2019), Indian cricketer
- Narayan Apte (1911–1949), convicted for assassination of M K Gandhi
- Narayan Hari Apte (1889–1971), Marathi author and script-writer
- S. S. Apte or Shivram Shankar Apte (1907–1985), RSS pracharak and founder of Vishva Hindu Parishad
- Vaman Shivram Apte (1858–1892), Indian lexicographer
- Vinay Apte (1951–2013), Indian television actor
- Shanta Apte (1916–1964), Indian actress
- Prakash Apte, professor
- Urmila Balawant Apte, founder of the women's organization Bhartiya Stree Shakti
- Sunila Apte, female badminton player
- Minoti Apte, Indian medical researcher
- Radhika Apte (born 1985), Indian actress
