= Ovali =

Village in Maharashtra

- Village
- Interactive map of Ovali
- Country: India
- State: Maharashtra
- District: Ratnagiri
- Elevation: 26 m (85 ft)

Languages
  - Official: Marathi
- Time zone: UTC+5:30 (IST)
- Pin Code: 415604

Ovali (or Owali) is a village located in Chiplun Taluka of Ratnagiri district, Maharashtra with approximately 235 families and a population just above 994. It is one of 166 villages in Chiplun block and along with the 12 other neighbouring villages they form a community of people from different castes and religions.

The village is located in a valley in the foothills of western ghats of Maharashtra, India, and scenically surrounded by the highest peaks of Sahyadri on all three sides. The open fields provide recreational opportunities to the locals and only rice is mainly grown here, however Ovali and the district are also known superior varieties of Alphonso.

Ovali has shallow ponds and bridges vulnerable to rainy seasons, Ovali is bordered by Khed Taluka on the north, Sangmeshwar Taluka on the south, Guhagar Taluka on the west, Dapoli Taluka on the west and Satara District on the east.

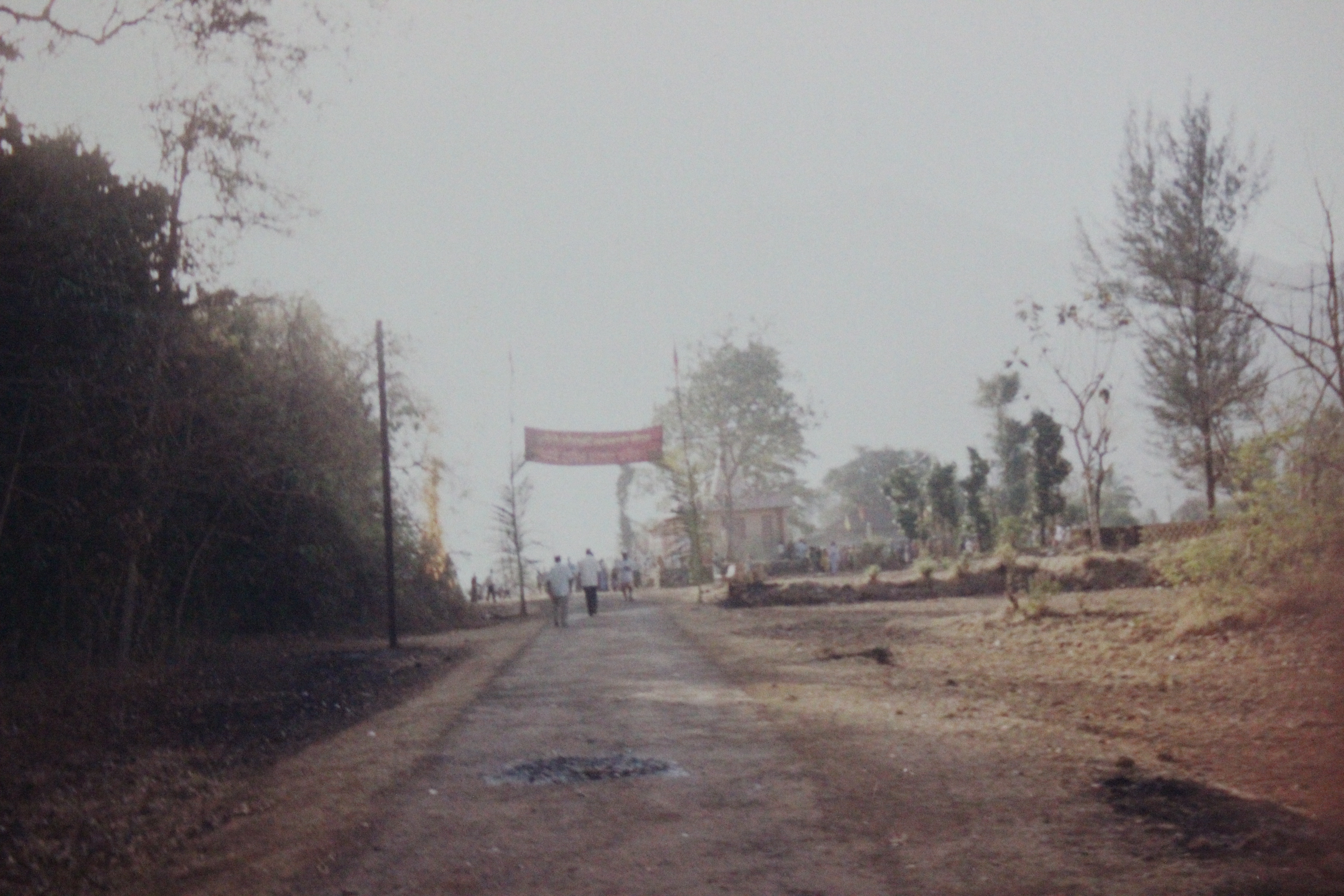
Ovali (मौज॓ आ॓वळी) Taluka Chiplun

== Location ==
The village is 30 km from Mumbai, 120 km from Pune, 105 km from Ratnagiri and 20 km from Chiplun. It is surrounded by the ranges of Shayadri and Chiplun, Mahabaleswar, Satara, and Wai are nearby cities.

== Climate ==
- Summer : March - mid June,
- Rainy : mid June–October
- Winter : November–February.

Since the town is located on the Konkan coast, it has quite a moderate climate, with temperatures in the range of 35^{c} to 40^{c} during summer and 20^{c} to 26^{c} during winter. The rainy season has heavy rains by the south-west Monsoon. The average annual rainfall is in excess of 3500 mm.

== Schools ==
- Prathamik Shaala Mauje Ovali (Primary School)
- Late. Kailash Rajaramrao R Shinde High School (Ovali-Nandivase)

== Added Information ==
- Telephone Code = 0235
- State Code = 27
- District Code = 528
- Tahsil Code = 04269
- Census Code = 565249
