= Durga Mandir =

Durga Mandir may refer to the following temples:

== India ==
- Durga temple, Aihole, Karnataka
- Durga Temple, Baideshwar, Orissa
- Durga Temple, Motia, Orissa
- Durga Mandir, Ramnagar, Uttar Pradesh
- Durga Mandir, Varanasi, Uttar Pradesh

== United States ==
- Durga Temple of Virginia, Lorton, Virginia
