= Kanitkar =

Surname used by Konkanastha Brahmins

Kanitkar is a surname used by Konkanastha Brahmins, the Konkanastha Chitapavan sub-caste of Brahmins in India. Kanitkars, like most other Konkanastha Chitpavan Brahmins, originate in the Konkan strip on the western seacoast of India – about 300-500 kilometers south of Mumbai. Kanitkars (other names: Satkar) were from original five towns and 23 descendant families, spread to 110 towns by 1988. Kanitkars belong to Kaushik Gotra, and consider Shree Vyadeshwar at Guhaghar, Maharashtra, India as their primary "family god" [Kul Daivat].

A large majority of Kanitkars still live in Pune, Maharashtra, India – with the rest in Mumbai, Vadodara and many other cities. Several Kanitkars have also migrated to foreign countries – United States, Australia and Singapore, to name a few.

Genealogy of Kanitkars is documented in "Kanitkar Kul Vrutanta", the latest (second) edition was published on 26 January 1988. At that time, there were around 780 Kanitkar males and 530 females living:

Gharane No.	Gharane Name	Total Males	Living Males	Living Females	Popular Cities	Contact
1	Basani – Ganeshwadi	283	124	70	Mumbai, Pune	Jayant Mahadeo
2	Basani – Sakharpe	128	43	30	Mumbai	
3	Basani – Dhom	77	27	34	Pune, Mumbai	Vasudeo Janardan
4	Basani – Vetoshi	43	16	10	Pune, Kolhapur	
5	Palshet – Adoor	191	65	38	Mumbai, Pune	Rajan Yashwant
6	Palshet – Junnar	202	101	66	Mumbai, Pune	Girish Sudhakar
7	Palshet – Bavdhan	237	110	78	Pune, Vadodara	Maheshwar Ramchandra
8	Palshet – Kothure	38	3	5	Sangli	
9	Palshet – LimbaGanesh	77	37	28	Limbaganesh, Aurangabad, Pune, Mumbai, Thane	Mandar Kanitkar
10	Palshet – Chandwad	34	5	4	Mumbai	
11	Palshet – Shirdhon	103	50	39	Pune, Mumbai	
12	Palshet – Padli	39	15	5	Pune	
13	Palshet – Bhadkambe	137	54	36	Mumbai, Gwalior	Guruprasad Dattatray
14	Palshet – Aachre	31	0	1		
15	Palshet – Siddheshwar	46	18	14	Mumbai	
16	Palshet – Guttal	74	33	16	Hubli	Sharad Madhav
17	Palshet – Guhaghar	34	2	3	Guhagar	Sanjay Vinayak
18	Palshet – Ambegaon	27	0	0		
19	Palshet – Tarapur	34	5	5	Tarapur	
20	Palshet – Chinchner	21	6	2	Pune, Satara	
21	Bhatgaon – Aanjarle	43	21	17	Mumbai, Mahad	
22	Nandiwade – Vileparle	29	14	11	Mumbai	Mandar Chintamani
23	Weldoor – Bhiwandi	45	21	13	Mumbai, Pune	

These 1300+ Kanitkars live in 102 different cities/towns in 475 families. Most are in Greater Mumbai (129), Pune (106), Sangli (19), Vadodara (39) and Kolhapur (14).

Most popular Male names were Dattatray (15), Vinayak (12), Madhav, Milind, Vishwanath and Yashwant (11 each), and Gajanan, Gopal, Laxman and Prabhakar (10 each.) Popular female names were Usha (16), Jayashree (11), Anjali and Vijaya (10 each.)
