= Rajiv Shekhar =

Professor and administrator

Director at Indian Institute of Technology (Indian School of Mines) Dhanbad
- In office March 2018 – 2023
- Preceded by: Durga Charan Panigrahi

Professor at Indian Institute of Technology Kanpur
- In office 2001 – present (on lien)

Visiting professor at Indian Institute of Technology Jodhpur
- In office 2012–2013

Personal details
- Born: 1960 (age 65–66)
- Education: Indian Institute of Technology Kanpur; University of California Berkeley
- Profession: Professor; Consultant; Administrator
- Known for: Materials processing Designing metallurgical reactors
- Website: Official website

Rajiv Shekhar (born 1960) is a professor at IIT Kanpur and he was the former director at IIT(ISM) Dhanbad. Prior to joining IIT(ISM) Dhanbad, he worked as a professor at the Department of Materials Science and Engineering, IIT Kanpur. In recent times, he has been actively working towards research related to Solar thermal energy and applications.

== Controversies ==
In 2018, Rajiv Shekhar along with 3 other professors from IIT Kanpur was accused of making caste related remarks upon a newly appointed assistant professor at department of Aerospace engineering. As a consequence, the assistant professor logged an FIR against them of charges of harassment, mental torture and making caste remarks at local police.

The students and senior faculty members of the institute protested in front of IIT Kanpur director's residence for nearly two hours. The teachers threatened to boycott exams and tender collective resignation, while the students informed the authorities that they would start an agitation if the FIR was not expunged.

A high court judge found the four teachers guilty of flouting IIT Kanpur's conduct code and the SC/ST Preventions Atrocities Act and as a result the complaint was taken to the National Commission for Scheduled Castes (NCSC).

The IIT Kanpur Board of Governors (BOG) last year found all the four teachers guilty of caste-based discrimination and has taken steps against the other three. But it has not acted against Prof. Shekhar as he had already been appointed director of IIT Dhanbad with the approval of the Visitor, the President of India.

== Selected bibliography ==
=== Selected articles ===
- Shukla, N.; Harbola, M. K.; Sanjay, K.; Shekhar, R. (March 2017). "Electrochemical Fencing of Cr(VI) from Industrial Wastes to Mitigate Ground Water Contamination". Transactions of the Indian Institute of Metals. 70 (2): 511–518. doi:10.1007/s12666-016-1000-y. S2CID 137808100.
- Kumar, Vinod; Shekhar, Rajiv; Balasubramaniam, R.; Balani, Kantesh (June 2012). "Microstructure evolution and texture development in thermomechanically processed Mg–Li–Al based alloys". Materials Science and Engineering: A. 547: 38–50. doi:10.1016/j.msea.2012.03.074.
- Bilgi, Dayanand S.; Jain, V. K.; Shekhar, R.; Kulkarni, Anjali V. (24 July 2007). "Hole quality and interelectrode gap dynamics during pulse current electrochemical deep hole drilling". The International Journal of Advanced Manufacturing Technology. 34 (1–2): 79–95. doi:10.1007/s00170-006-0572-9. S2CID 110892162.
- Bilgi, Dayanand S.; Jain, V.K.; Shekhar, R.; Mehrotra, Shaifali (June 2004). "Electrochemical deep hole drilling in super alloy for turbine application". Journal of Materials Processing Technology. 149 (1–3): 445–452. doi:10.1016/j.jmatprotec.2003.09.008.
- Sharma, S.; Jain, V.K.; Shekhar, R. (19 April 2002). "Electrochemical Drilling of Inconel Superalloy with Acidified Sodium Chloride Electrolyte". The International Journal of Advanced Manufacturing Technology. 19 (7): 492–500. doi:10.1007/s001700200052. S2CID 109706267.
