= Durgesh =

Durgesh may refer to:

- Durgesh Pathak, Indian politician and Member of Legislative Assembly in Delhi
- Kandula Durgesh, Indian Politician and member of Andhra Pradesh Legislative Council
- Durgeshnandini, romance novel by Indian writer Bankim Chandra Chatterjee
  - Durgesh Nandinii, an Indian television series
- Saurabh-Durgesh, an Indian music producer duo

== See also ==
- Durga (disambiguation)
