= Prakash Apte =

Indian academic

- Born: India
- Citizenship: India
- Education: IIT Bombay; IIM Calcutta; Columbia University
- Scientific career
- Fields: Economics, Finance
- Workplaces: National Institute of Bank Management; Indian Institute of Management Bangalore

Prakash G Apte (died June 10, 2023) was an Indian economist, academic, and professor at the Indian Institute of Management Bangalore (IIM Bangalore). He served as Director of IIM Bangalore from 2002 to 2007 and held the UTI Chair in Capital Market Studies at the institute.

== Early life and education ==
Apte received his early education in India and graduated from the Indian Institute of Technology Bombay. He later studied at the Indian Institute of Management Calcutta. He earned a Ph.D. in Economics from Columbia University before beginning his academic career.

== Academic career ==
Apte joined the Indian Institute of Management Bangalore in September 1977. He was a faculty member in the Economics and Social Sciences area and taught courses in economics, econometrics, macroeconomics, and international finance. He continued teaching at the institute until his retirement in 2012. He held the UTI Chair in Capital Market Studies at IIM Bangalore from 1994. In addition to his work at IIM Bangalore, Apte taught at several international institutions, including Columbia University, Katholieke Universiteit Leuven, and EDHEC Business School. He also taught international finance at Narsee Monjee Institute of Management Studies (NMIMS), Mumbai.

== Death ==
Apte died on 10 June 2023 in Mumbai.
