= Durga Nagar Part-V =

- city
- Location in Assam, India Durga Nagar Part-V (India)
- Coordinates: 24°53′04″N 92°52′40″E
- Country: India
- State: Assam
- District: Cachar

Population (2001)
  - Total: 7,425

Languages
  - Official: Bengali and Meitei (Manipuri)
- Time zone: UTC+5:30 (IST)
- Vehicle registration: AS

Durga Nagar Part-V is a census town in Cachar district in the state of Assam, India.

== Demographics ==
Bengali and Meitei (Manipuri) are the official languages of this place.

As of 2001 India census, Durga Nagar Part-V had a population of 7,425. Males constitute 50% of the population and females 50%. Durga Nagar Part-V has an average literacy rate of 80%, higher than the national average of 59.5%: male literacy is 82% and, female literacy is 78%. In Durga Nagar Part-V, 11% of the population is under 6 years of age.
