= Urmila Balawant Apte =

Founder of India's Bharatiya Stree Shakti

Urmila Balavant Apte
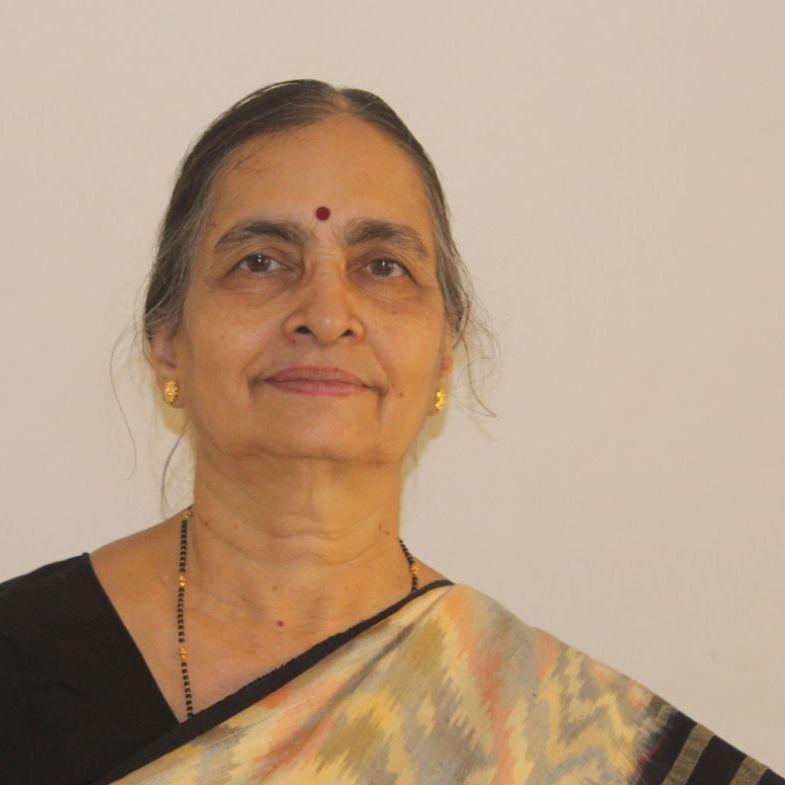
- c. 2018
- Education: University of Mumbai
- Occupation: Maths lecturer - leader of organisation
- Known for: Founder of the Bhartiya Stree Shakti organisation

Urmila Balavant Apte is the Indian Founder of the Bhartiya Stree Shakti organisation in 1988 which is dedicated to the empowerment of women. She received the Nari Shakti Puraskar from President Ram Nath Kovind in 2018 for her work.

== Life ==
Apte is a mathematician who gained a master's degree from the University of Mumbai in mathematics. In 1969 she used her teaching qualification and master's degree to teach maths at various colleges in Mumbai.

She founded, Bhartiya Stree Shakti (BSS), in 1988. BSS is an organisation for the empowerment of women. The organisation seeks to end discrimination based on gender and to empower women. It works to recognise women's contribution to the nation and to the family.

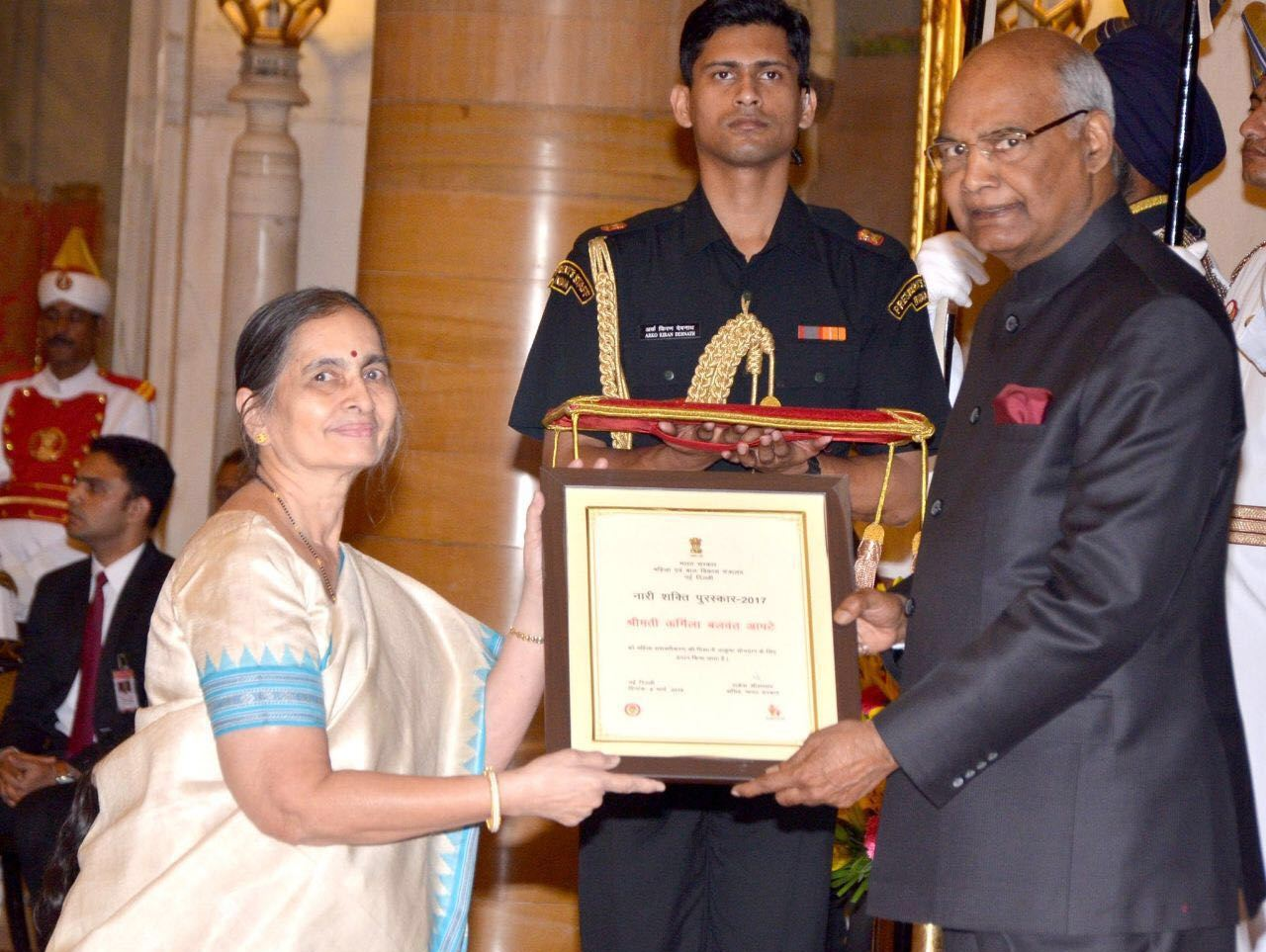
Urmila Balavant Apte getting the Nari Shakti Puraskar from President Kovind

She served as the President of the Bhartiya Stree Shakti until 1995. In that year she became the All-India Organising Secretary and that is a role she retained until 2014. During her time she has travelled across her county to support those interested in the Bharatiya Stree Shakti organisation. Ten states in India have at least one branch and it total there are 33 branches. From 2014 she sat on the National Executive Council of BSS.

In 2018 a two-day meeting of the Bhartiya Stree Shakti to celebrate thirty years since it was founded attracted 1,000 delegates from around India.

She was awarded the Nari Shakti Puraskar on International Women's Day in 2018. The award was made by President Kovind at the Presidential Palace (Rastrapati Bhavan) in New Delhi with the Prime Minister of India, Narendra Modi also attending. Thirty-nine people or organisations were honoured that year. They received the award and a prize of $R 100,000.
