= Durga Temple of Virginia =

Hindu temple in Lorton, Virginia US

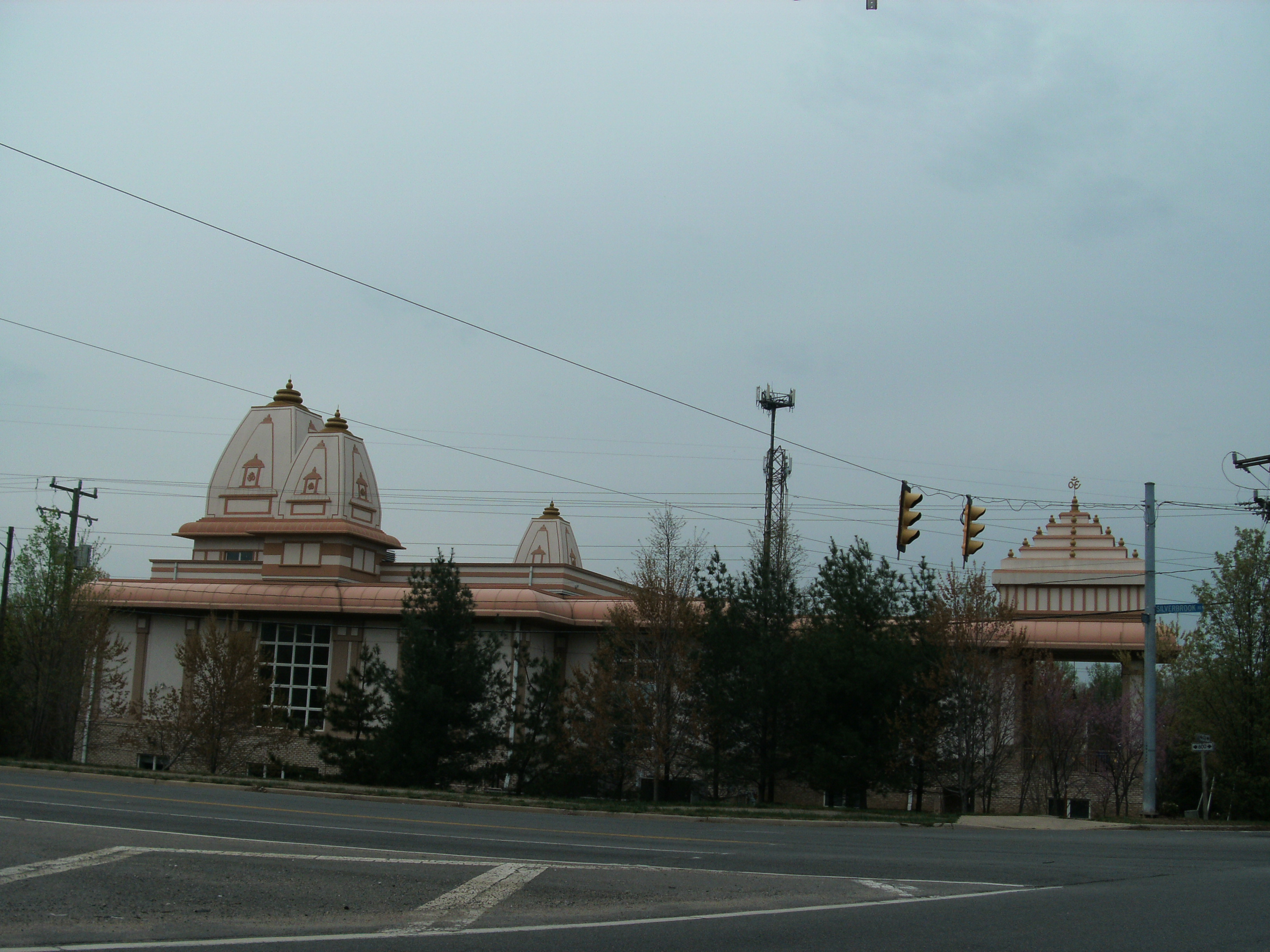

- Location within Northern Virginia Location within Virginia Location within the United States

Religion
- Affiliation: Hinduism
- Deity: Durga

Location
- Location: Lorton
- State: Virginia
- Country: United States
- Coordinates: 38.728602°N 77.251150°W

Architecture
- Completed: 1999

Website
- http://www.durgatemple.org/

Durga Temple of Virginia is a Hindu Temple located in Lorton, Virginia and serves the Hindu population in the Washington DC Metropolitan Area. In 2010, the temple served 6500 Hindus residing in Fairfax County. The temple is notably the first Hindu temple in Northern Virginia.

== History ==
In 1991, The Durga Temple was established as a religious organization for Northern Virginia. In 1996, work began on constructing the Hindu Temple. It was financed with a 2.5 million Dollar loan from First Virginia Bank (now part of Truist Financial). In October 1996, Bhoomi Pooja was held to celebrate the groundbreaking ceremony. The Temple was complete on March 21, 1999. The Durga Temple held a "Hinduism Summit" to educate people on Hinduism, The Struggle of Hindus, Hindu History and to change the perception of Hindus in America. The temple also offers Indian Cultural Classes, Spiritual classes and a Boy Scouts Program.
