= Minoti Apte =

Indian-Australian pancreatologist

Professor Minoti Apte OAM FAHMS
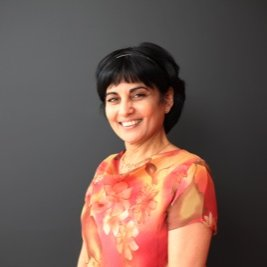
- Education: University of Poona (MBBS); University of Newcastle (Australia) (MMedSci); University of New South Wales (PhD)
- Known for: Discovering pancreatic stellate cells
- Scientific career
- Fields: Pancreatology
- Thesis: Molecular mechanisms of alcohol-induced pancreatic injury (1997)
- Doctoral advisors: Romano Cesare Pirola; Jeremy Somers Wilson

Minoti Vivek Apte is an Indian-born Australian pancreatology researcher and is the Director of Pancreatic Research Group at the University of South Wales and Ingham Institute for Applied Medical Research in Liverpool, New South Wales, Australia. She is also a classical Indian dancer and choreographer.
Apte is notable for her many achievements in the field of pancreatic disease research, including becoming the first in the world to successfully isolate pancreatic stellate cells (PSCs), the cells associated with pancreatic fibrogenesis. The effectiveness of this isolation method allowed her team to prove that PSCs’ close communication with cancerous cells contributes to the aggressiveness of pancreatic cancer, a major discovery that led the government of New South Wales to award her The Premier's Award for Woman of the Year in 2015.

== Education and career ==
Apte was born in India to a family that encouraged its female members to seek education and to earn professional accomplishments. Her great-aunt was a gynecologist, and her aunt and grandmother were respectively principal and founder and principle of girl's schools. As a high school student in 1974, Apte won the state prize for 100% marks in mathematics at the High School Certificate Exam. In 1982 she earned her MBBS from the University of Poona in India after graduating with honors with the intention of becoming an ophthalmologist. These plans were disrupted soon after her graduation, when Apte left India for Australia with her husband. While waiting to re-sit for the exams that would allow her to work as a doctor in Australia, Apte began volunteering for Newcastle Hospital’s pathology lab, where she developed an interest in medical research and especially research into the mechanisms behind pancreatic illness. Apte pursued this area of study at the University of New South Wales in Australia, from which she graduated with a Doctor of Philosophy in 1998, after becoming the first to successfully isolate PSCs.

== Honours and awards ==
She was awarded the New South Wales Woman of the Year Award in 2015 for this achievement and her continuing research in the field of pancreatic illness. Apte was presented with the Professor Rob Sutherland AO Make a Difference Award in the 2016 NSW Premier's Awards for Outstanding Cancer Research for her work improving pancreatic cancer outcomes. In October 2019 Apte was elected Fellow of the Australian Academy of Health and Medical Sciences (FAHMS).
