= Durga Temple, Motia =

Kanak Durga Temple, Motia
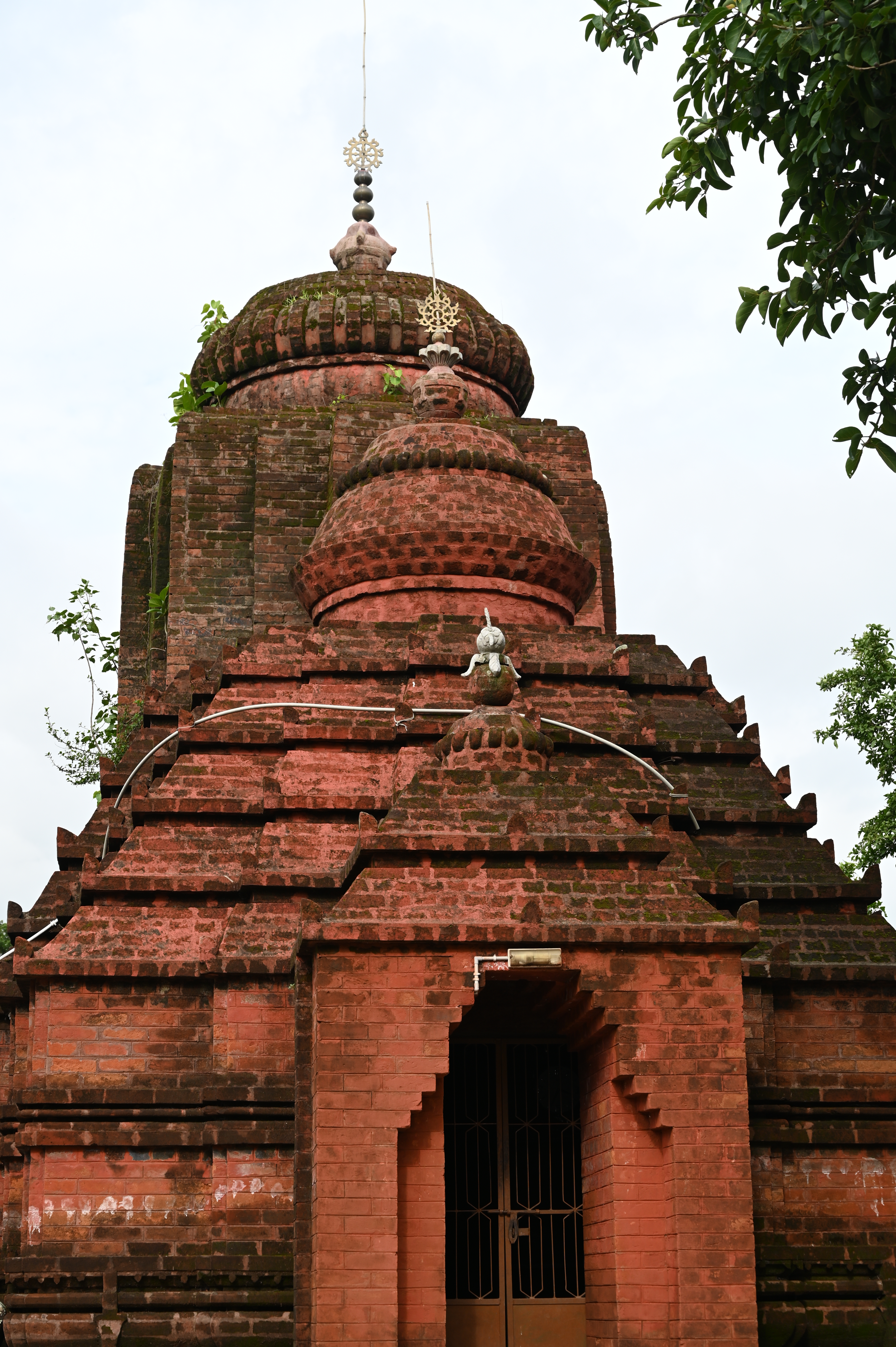
- 10th-century Kalinga temple dedicated to Kanak Durga at Motia

Religion
- Affiliation: Hinduism
- District: Cuttack district
- Deity: Lord Durga

Location
- Location: Nua Satanga and Motia in Cuttack district
- State: Odisha.
- Country: India
- Interactive map of Kanak Durga Temple, Motia
- Coordinates: 20.0696°N 86.1254°E

The temple of Kanak Durga is located near Krushnaprasad village in an area called Nua Satanga and Motia in Cuttack district, Odisha, India. The temple is dedicated to Mahishamardini and Chamunda.

The central icon which is worshipped is a four-handed goddess slaying Mahishasura. In her upper two hands she holds Shankha and Chakra, while the lower hands have a trident and a hand on the buffalo-headed demon. Several sculptures were discovered by the Archaeological Survey of India here which demonstrated that the shrine belongs to the era of Somavamsi rule during the 10th century. An image of Surya is worshipped here.

== Location ==
It can be approached from Phulnakhara square near Niali in Cuttack district. Regular bus service runs from Bhubaneswar to Niali, which is 65 kilometres (40 mi) away.

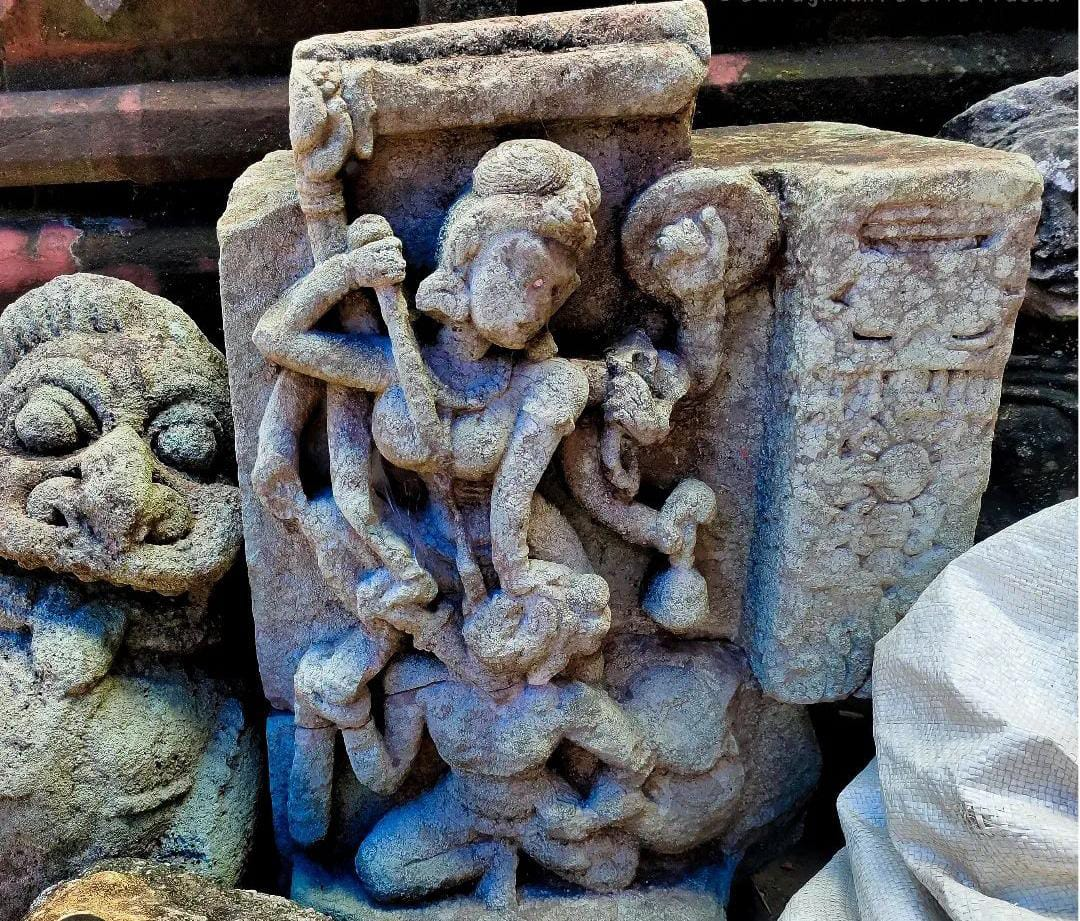
Mahishasura Mardini Durga

== Mahishasura Mardini Durga ==
This is a sculpture of Mahishasura Mardini Durga from the temple premise of kanak Durga temple. This is eight handed sculpture of maa Durga. In each hand she holds Chura, arrow, Khadga, Trisula, Dhala, Dhanu, Ghanta & in the lower left hand she holds the Mastaka of the Asura. Here Mahishasura is depicted in human form. If you look carefully you can notice a lion which is the vahana of maa Durga attacking the Mahishasura from the back. The eight handed Durga appeared about ninth century. This variety of Durga images from Prachi Valley are very similar to the Durga image of Bitala temple and thus can be assigned to ninth century in their style. This temple is built in 10th century.
