= Pabhare =

- Village
- Location in Maharashtra, India Pabhare (India)
- Coordinates: 17°57′52″N 73°23′50″E
- Country: India
- State: Maharashtra
- District: Ratnagiri district

Government
  - Type: Gram Panchayat

Population (2011)
  - Total: 486

Languages
  - Official: Marathi and Kokani
  - Other: Marathi
- Time zone: UTC+5:30 (IST)
- PIN: 415702
- Nearest town: Chiplun

Pabhare is a village in Guhagar taluka, Ratnagiri district, Maharashtra state, India. The village is surrounded by the river banks of Kasari and Kapsi on all three sides. It is 24 km from Guhagar and 35 km from Chiplun. The postal head office of the village is located at Rampur.

Goddess Chandika is the local deity of the village. The major occupation of the village is farming and cashew nut crop cultivation.

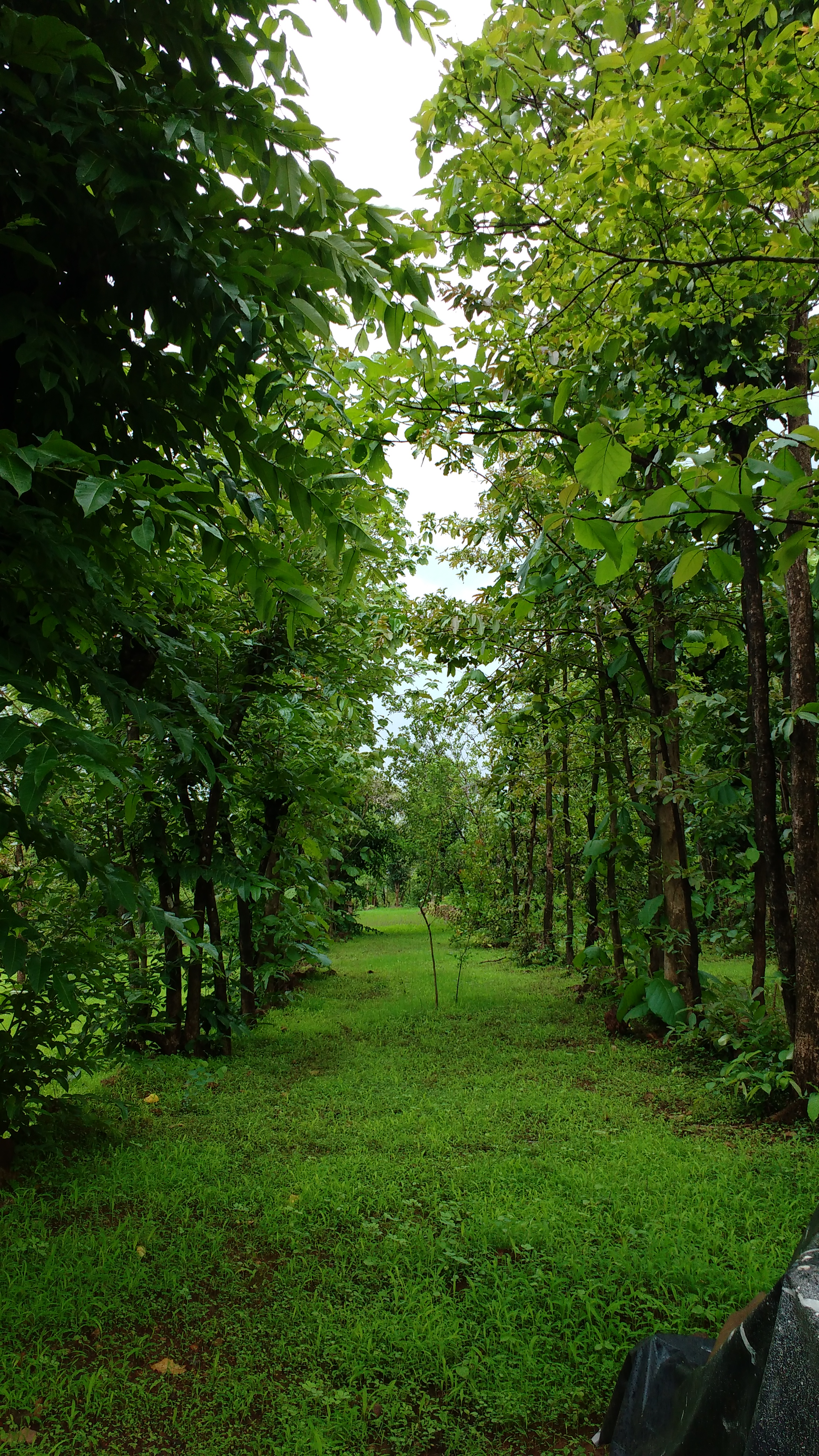
Forest Area

== History ==
Pabhare, being a rural village, did not have any facilities until independence. A school was established in 1949. In 1971, the Pabhare Gramastha Mandal, Mumbai was established which provided funds for further growth of the village.

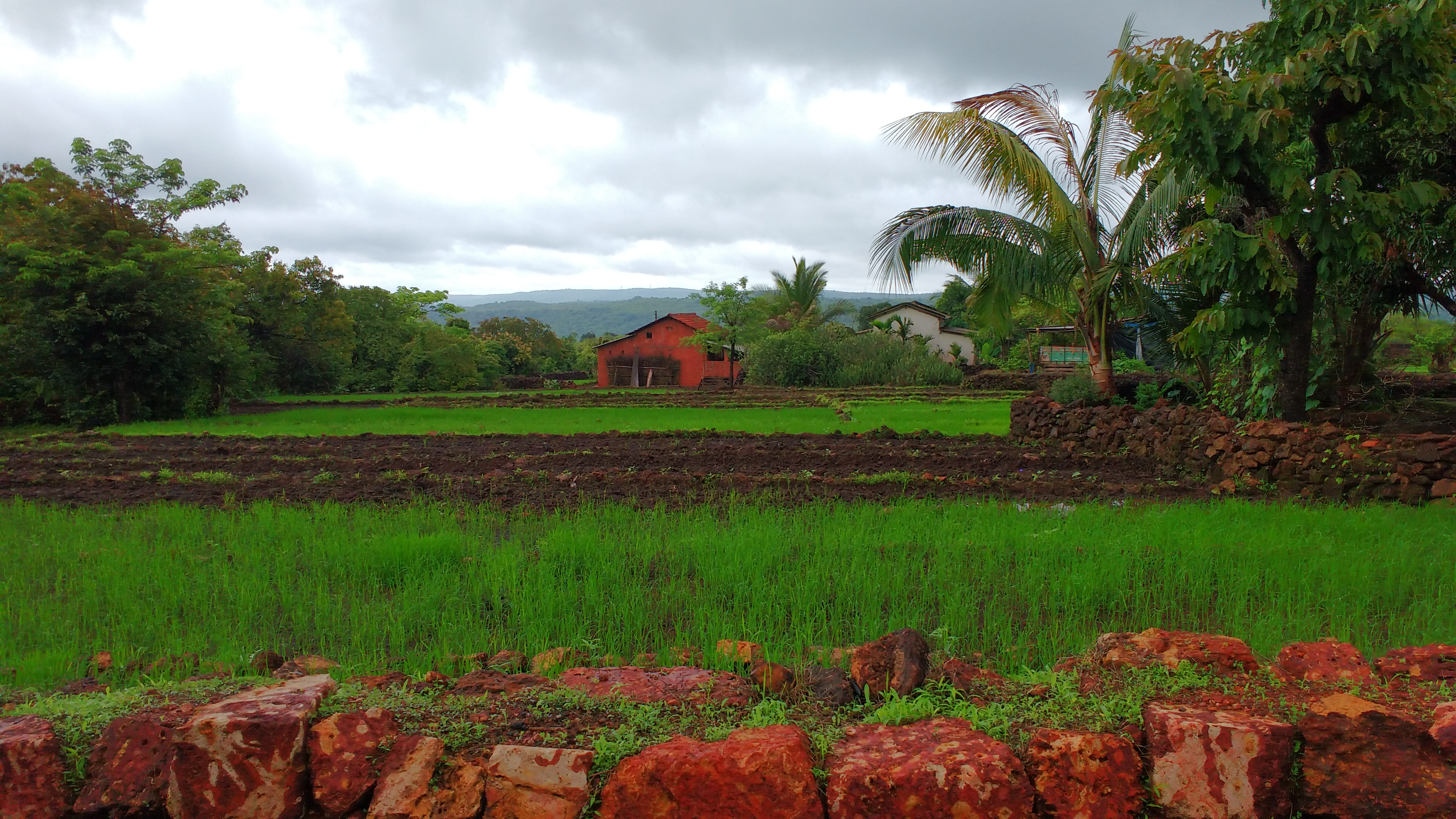
Local village area

== Demographics ==
As of the 2011 cens, Pabhare had a population of 406, 170 males and 236 females, giving a sex ratio of 1388, significantly higher than the state average of 929. 42 residents were aged 0–6 comprising 10.34% of the population, with a sex ratio of 750, significantly lower than the state average of 894. Pabhare had a literacy rate of 60.99% (males 73.97%, females 52.29%) compared to a state average of 82.34%.

== Culture ==
The people of the village worship their local deity, the 'Kuldaiwat'-Goddess Chandika. A classically architectured temple of the goddess is located in the vicinity. During the festival of Holi, a feast of the goddess is observed where the palanquin of the goddess pays its visit to every local house. A classic drama about the ten incarnations of lord Vishu finds a major attraction (locally known as the 'Naman'). A local dance form known as the 'Bala Dance' is also seen during the festival of Ganesh Chaturthi.

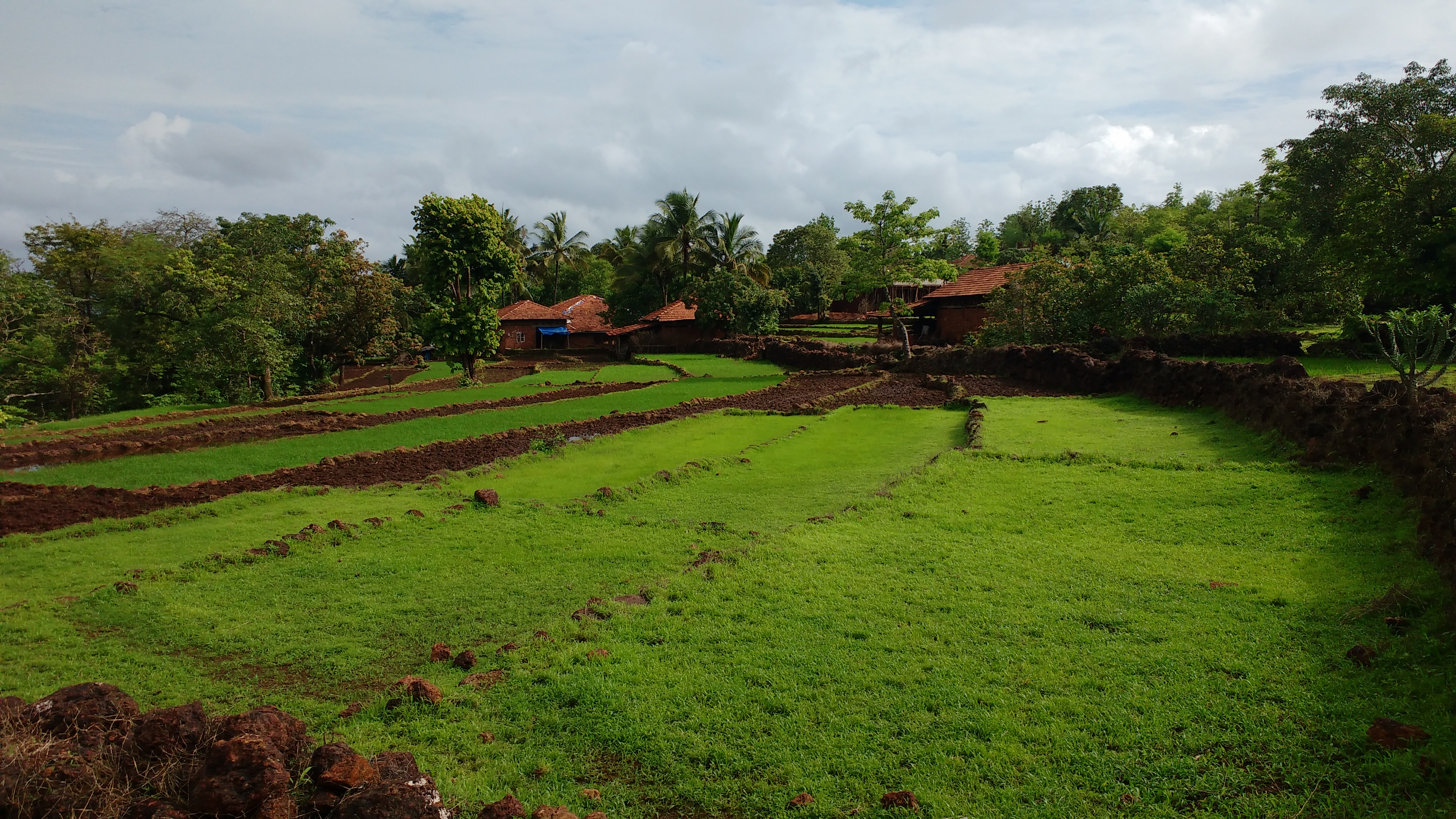
Rice Plantation

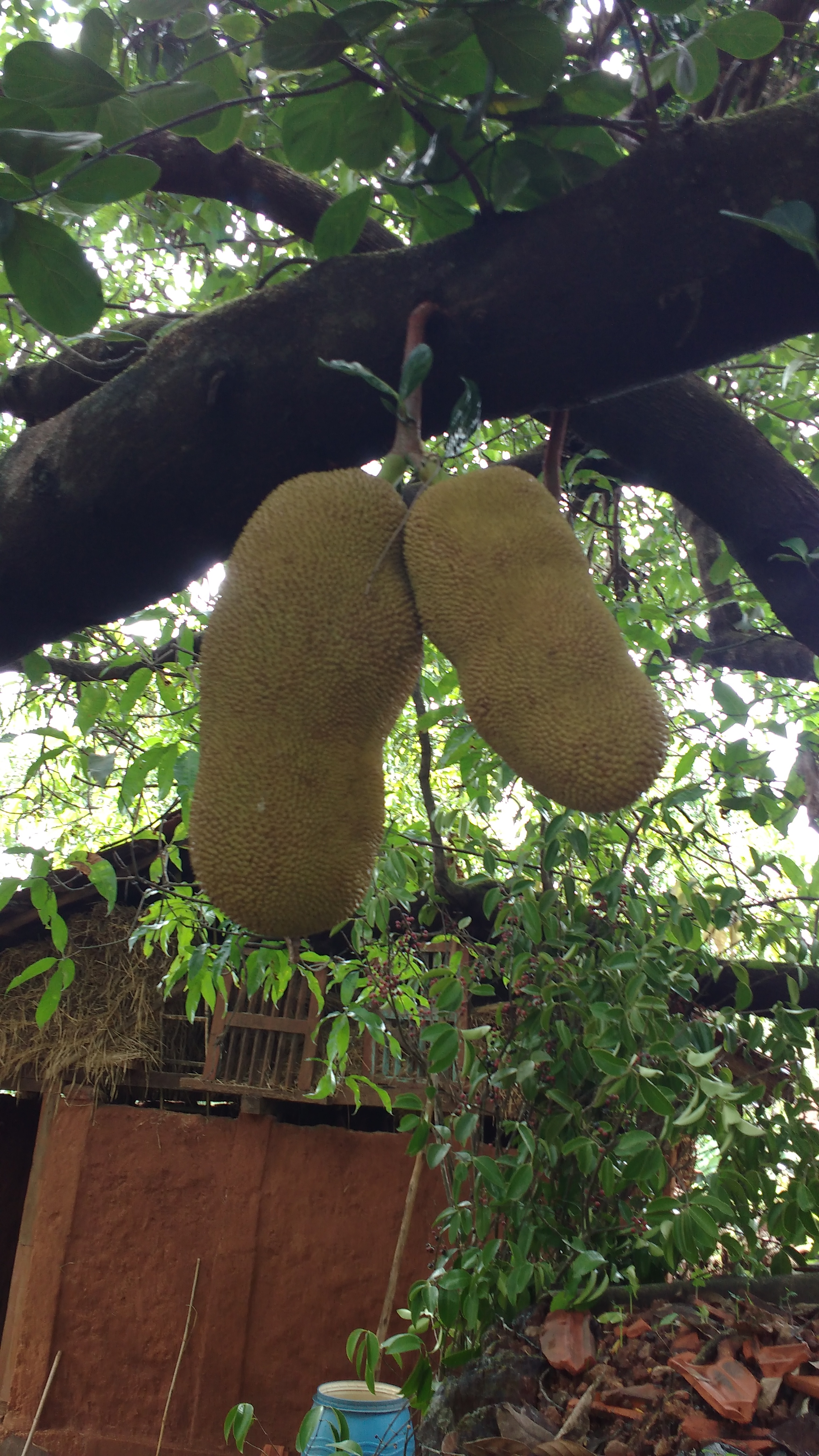
Jackfruit

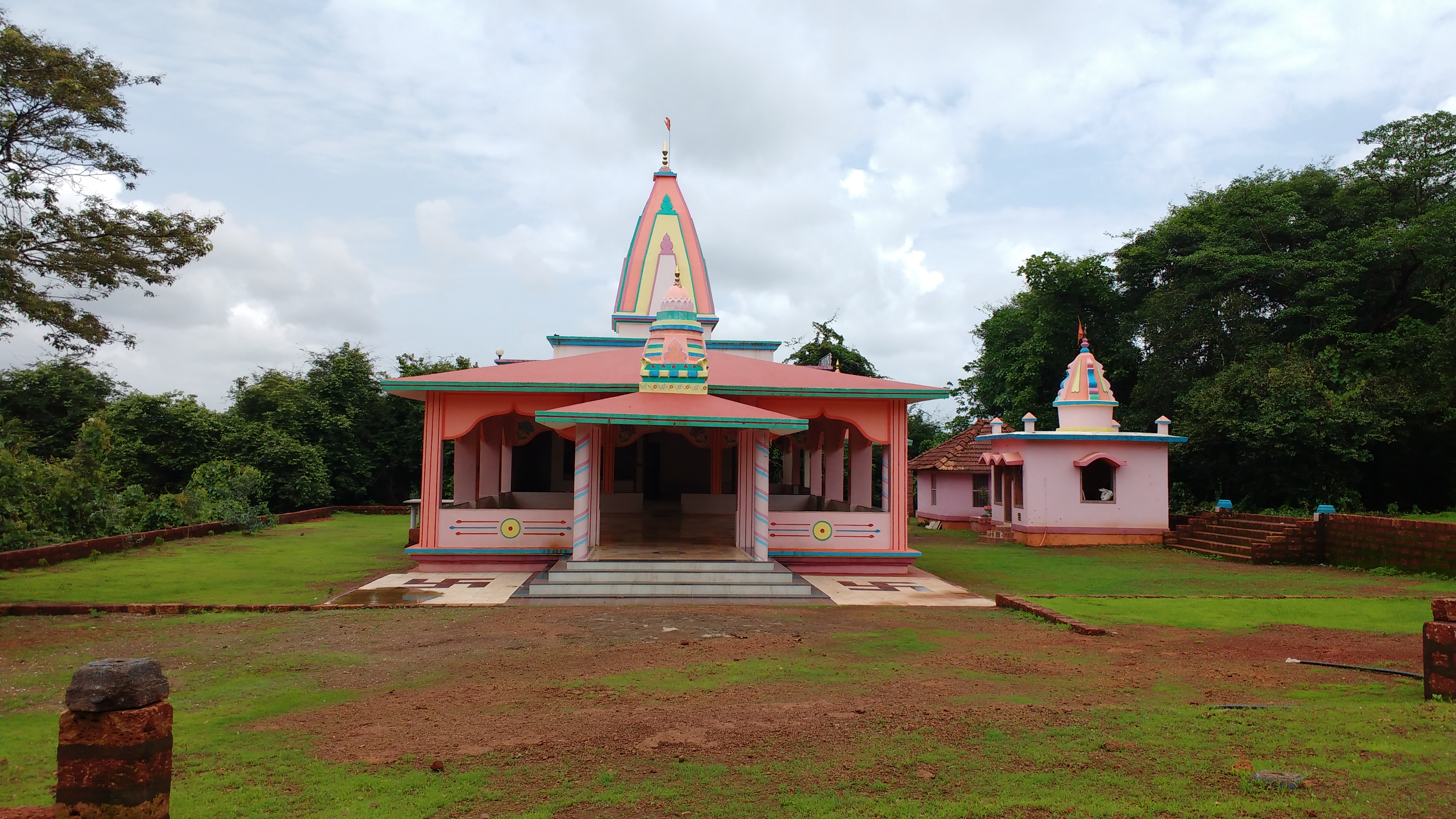
Chandika Temple

== Village structure ==
The village is divided majorly into 10 local settlements each known as 'Wadi', each with a varied population. The 8 settlements are named as Salkachiwadi, Madliwadi, Gavtanwadi, Raowadi, Brahmanwadi, Bamanewadi, Tepwadi, Ganeshwadi, Ghonaskande, Dhangarwadi and Durgwadi.

== Language ==
Marathi which is the state language is observed to be the most widely spoken language amongst the people in the village.

== Transport ==
The village is too rural to be connected easily to the city area of Guhaghar or Chiplun and hence one can reach this village via the bus service provided by MSTRC. These bus services are available from the city of Mumbai to Pabhare or one can even take a bus from Margatamhane (15 km) which is the neighbouring village and the nearest city area to Pabhare. Sharing autorickshaws, local vehicles are used as daily transportation facility from the village to the city area. The nearest railway station accessible is Chiplun which is 35 km from the village.
