= Durga Jain =

Indian social worker

Durga Jain is an Indian social worker known for her works related to betterment of children with Down syndrome. She was married into the Sahu Jain family and when her daughter was born, the daughter was detected with Down syndrome. She started a center for similar children; called Tinker Bell School at Pedder Road, Mumbai in 1968 which later on moved within the premises of Sophia College in 1970. The institute received funds from her father-in-law Shreyans Prasad Jain. It later developed into a full-time institute as SPJ Sadhana School. In 2014, she was awarded with Padma Shri, India's fourth highest civilian honour.
