= Durga (surname) =

Durga is an Indian surname. Notable people with the surname include:

- N. P. Durga, Indian politician
- S. A. K. Durga (1940–2016), Indian musicologist
