= Durga Deulkar =

Indian educationist and writer

- Born: India
- Occupations: Educationist, writer
- Awards: Padma Shri

Durga Deulkar is an Indian educationist and writer. She is a former director of Lady Irwin College, Delhi (1961–1978). She has written articles and has published books such as A guide to household textiles and laundry work, Household textiles and laundry work and An approach to teaching in the basic schools of India, with special reference to home economics. A recipient of a doctoral degree (PhD) from the Cornell University, USA, Deulkar received the fourth highest Indian civilian award of Padma Shri by the Government of India in 1976.
