= Durga Devi Temple, Guhagar =

Hindu temple in Maharashtra, India

Durga Devi Temple
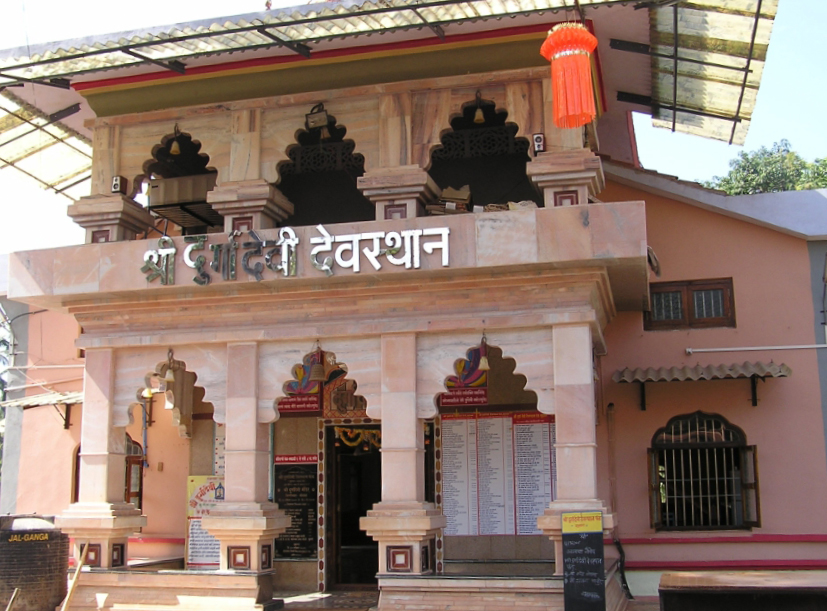
- Durga Devi temple

- Location in Maharashtra

Religion
- Affiliation: Hinduism
- Deity: Durga

Location
- Interactive map of Durga Devi Temple
- Coordinates: 17.494813°N 73.188067°E

Website
- www.durgashree.com

Shri durga aarti video

Durga Devi temple, Guhagar is a temple at Guhagar, a taluka in Ratnagiri district of Maharashtra state in India.

== Story ==
According to Hindu mythology, goddess defeated the ill energies in one night and saved Guhagar from possible destruction. During her war with the enemy, a pearl from one of the ornaments was broken. Goddess ordered one of her devotees to collect the broken pearl from a tree near the seashore.

The goddess also killed a devil named Mahishasura and hence got the name Mahishasoor Mardini

== Surroundings ==
Around the temple, there is a lake with a central wooden pillar. There are four temples of the subordinate shrines at four corners of the main temple, thus converting it into Panchayatan style temple. A Panchayatana temple has four subordinate shrines on four corners and the main shrine in the center of the podium, which comprises their base.

== Gallery ==
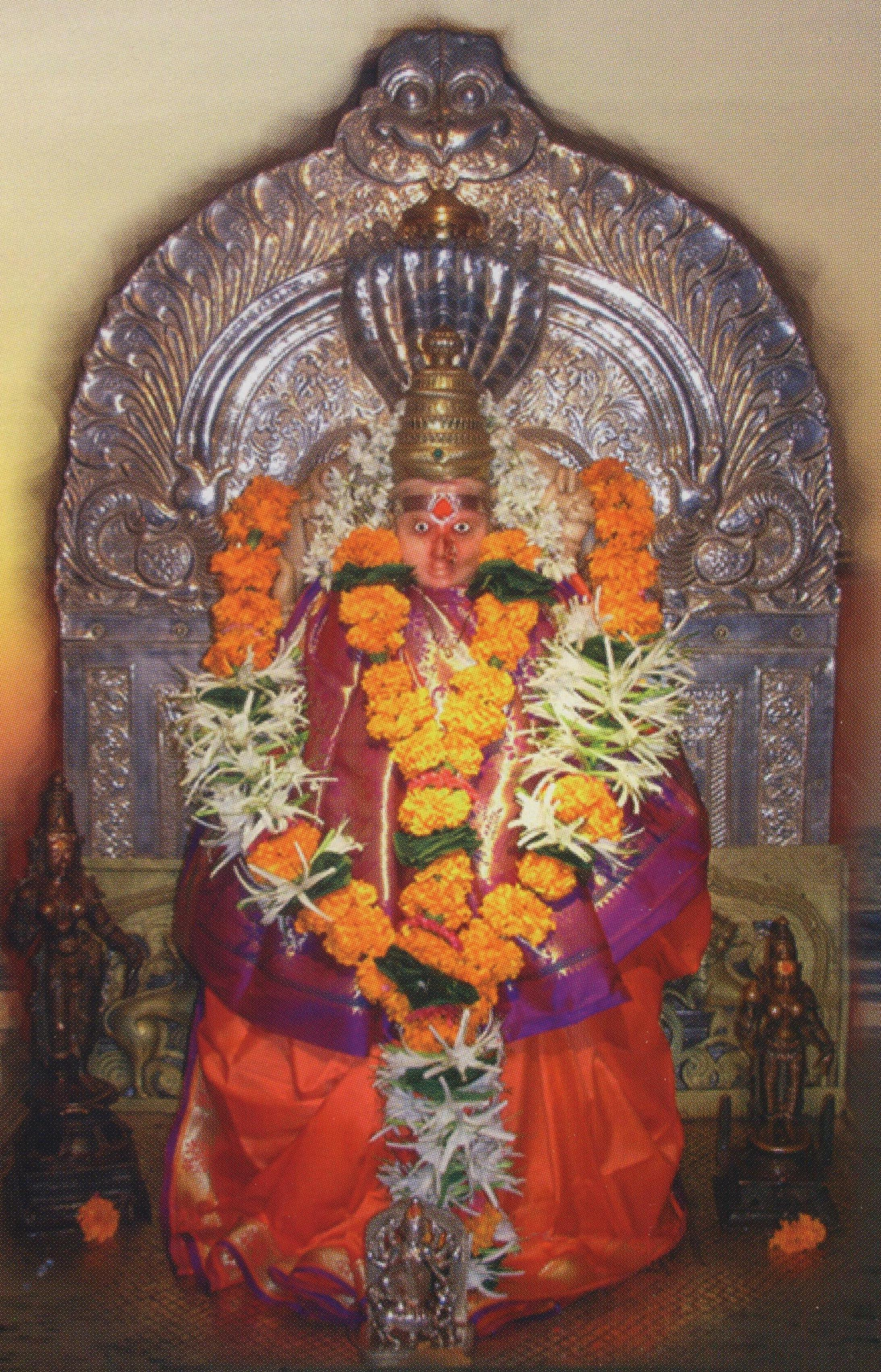
Shri Navadurga Devi, Guhagar

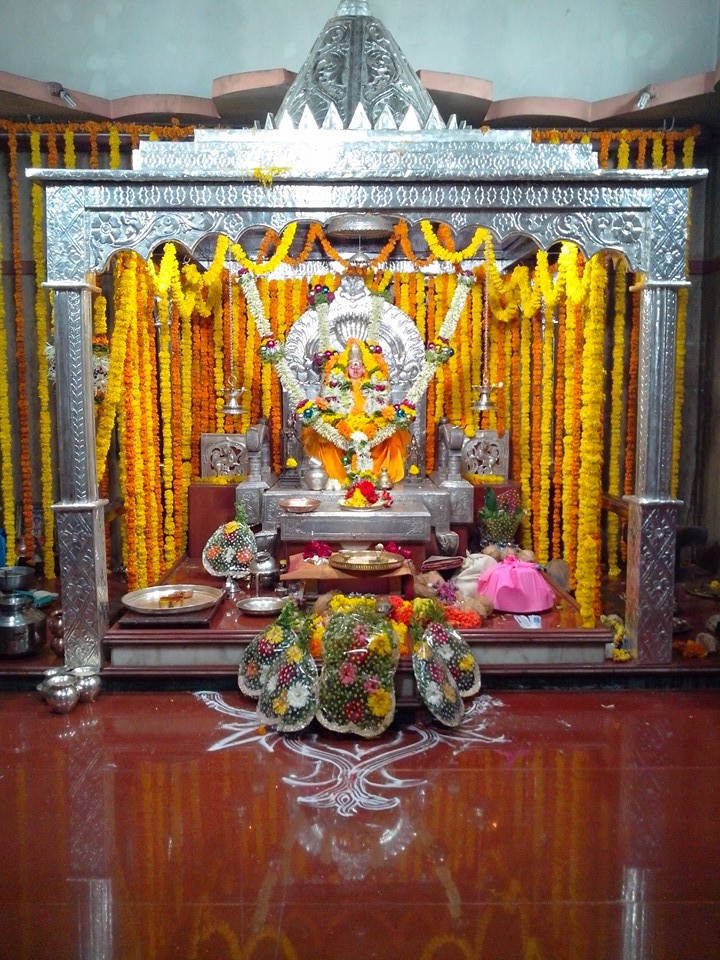
Shri Durgeche Manohari Roop

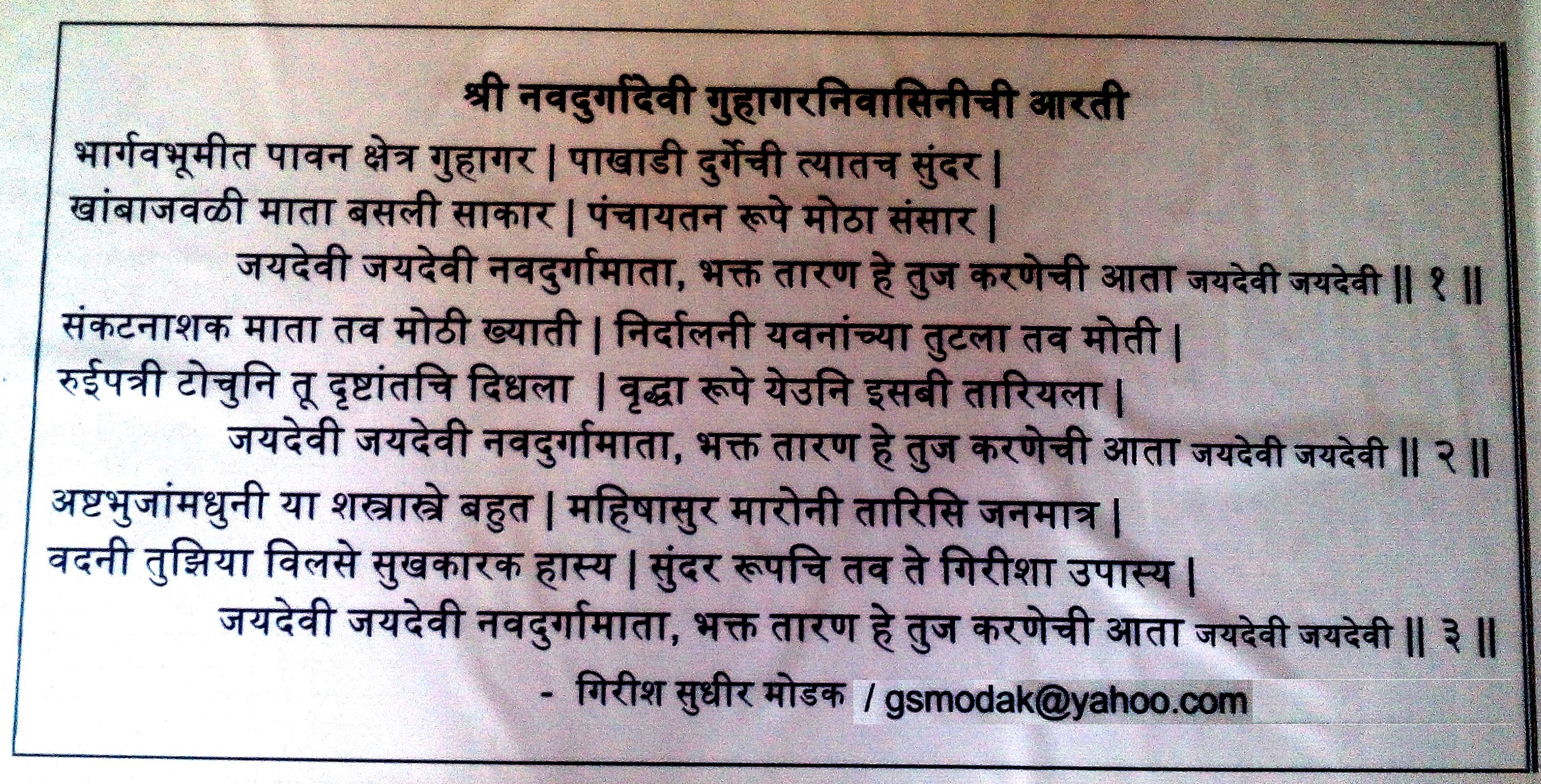
Official Aarti of Shri Navdurga of Guhagar

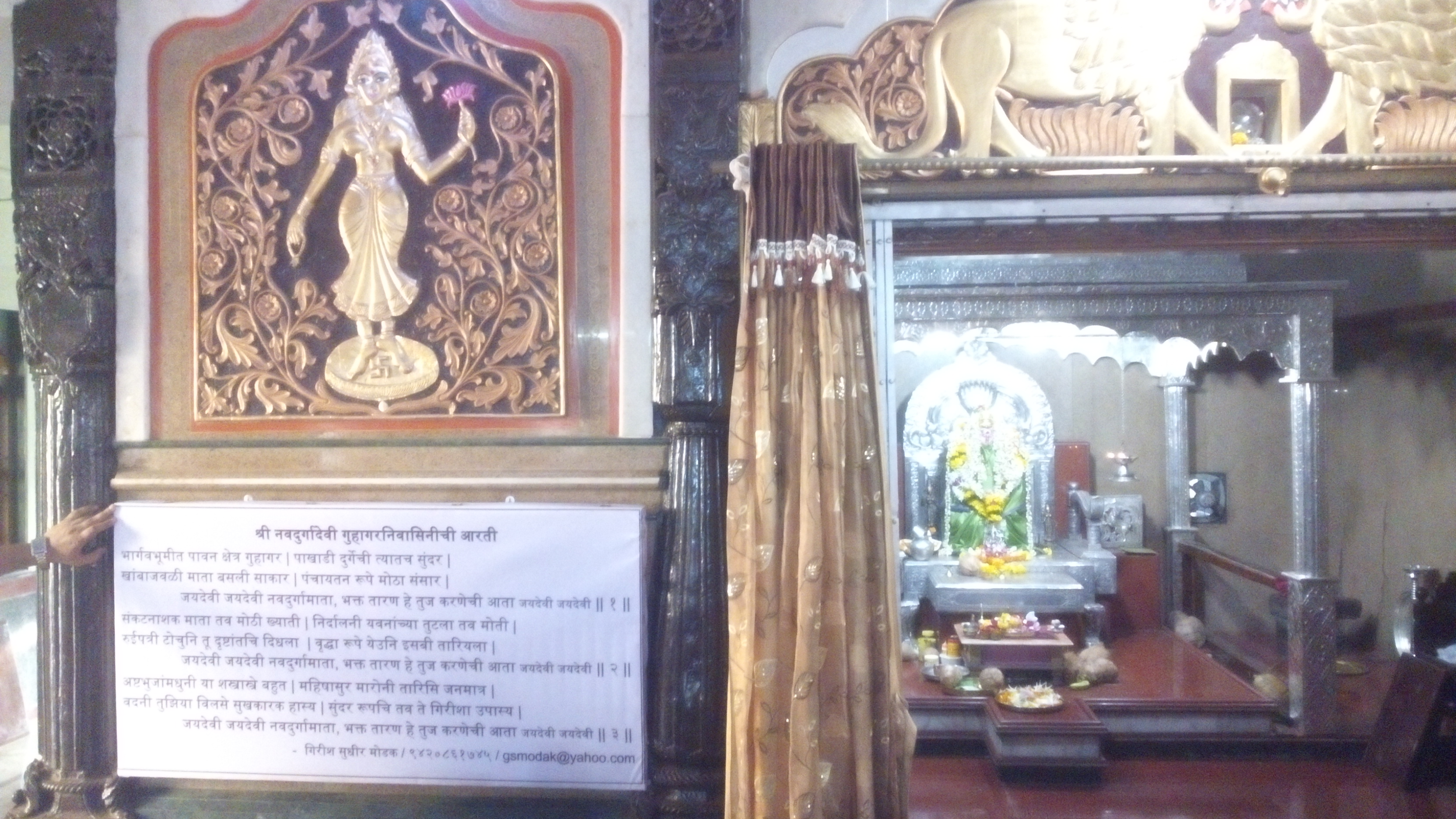
Shri Navdurga of Guhagar and her Official Aarti
