= Demus (surname) =

Demus is a surname. Notable people with the surname include:

- Chaka Demus (born 1963), Jamaican reggae musician and DJ
- Jörg Demus (1928–2019), Austrian classical pianist
- Lashinda Demus (born 1983), American hurdler
- Otto Demus (1902–1990), Austrian art historian
- Roberto Demus (born 1979), Argentinean footballer

== See also ==
- Scratchy Demus
