= Guhagar =

- town
- Location in Maharashtra, India
- Coordinates: 17.47°N 73.2°E
- Country: India
- State: Maharashtra
- District: Ratnagiri

Government
  - Body: Nagar panchayat
- Elevation: 10 m (33 ft)

Population (2011)
  - Total: 2,929

Languages
  - Official: Marathi
- Time zone: UTC+5:30 (IST)
- PIN: 415703
- Telephone code: 02359
- Vehicle registration: MH-08

Guhagar (Marathi pronunciation: [ɡuɦaːɡəɾ]) is a census town in Ratnagiri district in the Indian state of Maharashtra. Guhagar is known for its virgin beach, coir items, coconuts, betel nuts and mainly Alphonso mangoes. The nearest city and railhead is Chiplun, about 44 kilometres (27 mi) away.

Guhagar is the site of the Durga Devi temple, Guhagar and Shree Vyadeshwar temple. Guhagar's coconut is very famous in Konkan.

== Geography ==
The word Guhagar means cave house in local language. Guhagar is located at 17.47°N 73.2°E. It has an average elevation of 10 metres (33 feet). Guhagar has been featured in several films, including Killa. and the 2024 Hindi feature film Munjya.

== Demographics ==
As of 2001 India census, Guhagar had a population of 3205. Males constitute 52% of the population and females 48%. Guhagar has an average literacy rate of 82%, higher than the national average of 59.5%: male literacy is 86%, and female literacy is 78%. In Guhagar, 10% of the population is under 6 years of age.

== Gallery ==
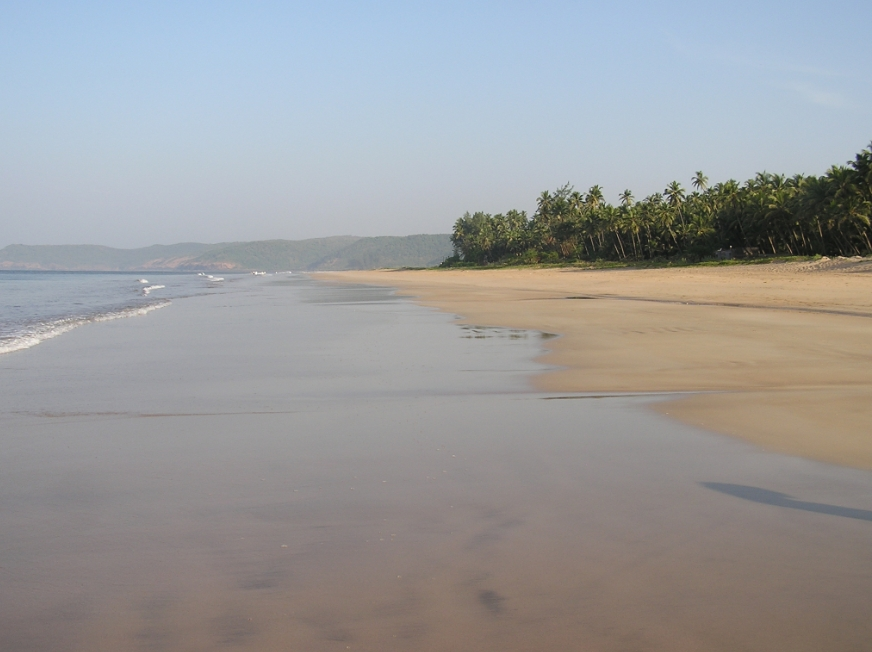
View of Guhagar Beach

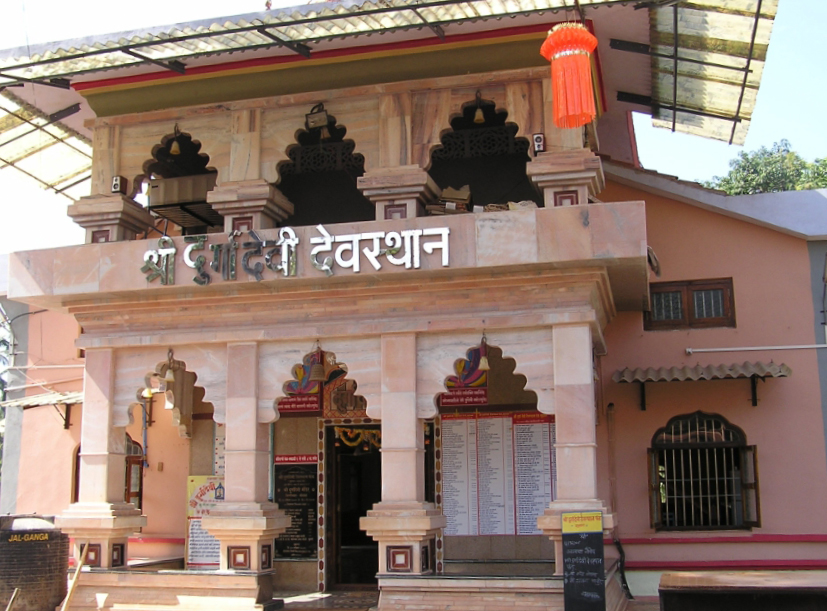
Durga Devi Temple

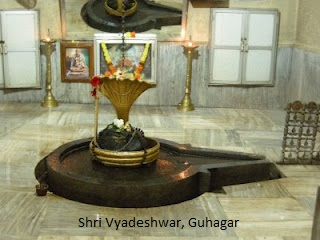
Pindi of Shri Vyadeshwar

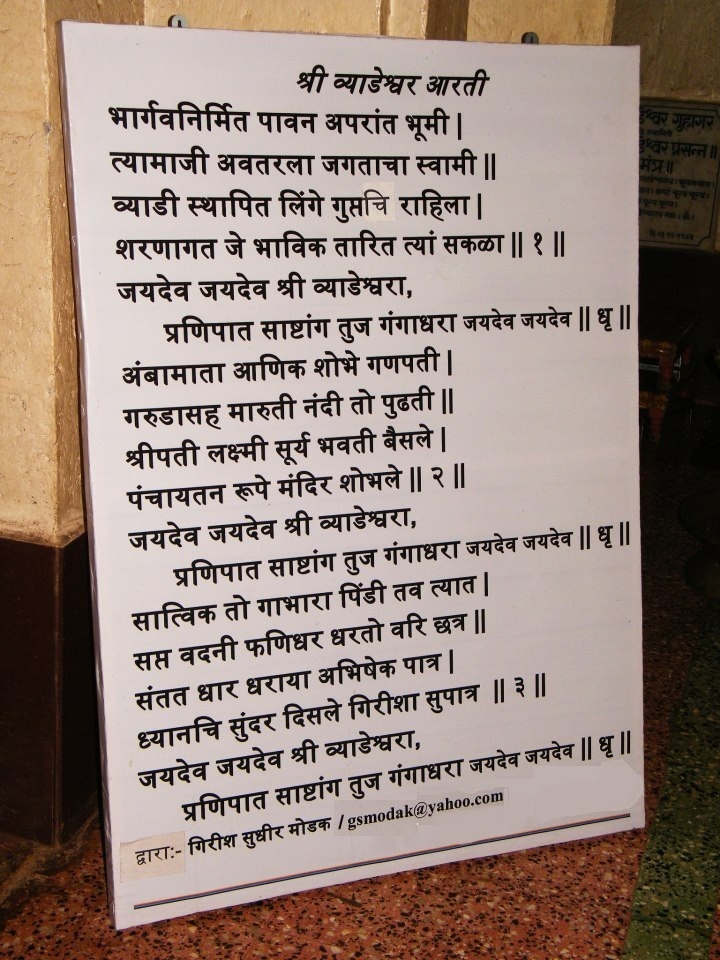
Shri Vyadeshwar Aarti

== See also ==
- Janavale
- Pabhare
