= Durga Charan Panigrahi =

- Born: 29 March 1961 (age 65)
- Education: Indian Institute of Technology (Indian School of Mines), Dhanbad
- Known for: Panigrahi's Law of Mine Ventilation
- Awards: The National Mineral Award, 1998
- Scientific career
- Fields: Mine engineering, mine ventilation
- Workplaces: Indian Institute of Technology (Indian School of Mines), Dhanbad

Durga Charan Panigrahi (born 29 March 1961) is an Indian mining scientist, author and was director of Indian Institute of Technology (Indian School of Mines), Dhanbad. He was awarded the National Mineral Award for the year 1998 by the Ministry of Mines and Minerals, Government of India for his contributions in the field of mining technology. His areas of research are Mine Ventilation, Mine Fire and sub-surface Environmental Engineering.

== Biography ==
Panigrahi was born on 29 March 1961. He completed his bachelor's degree in 1984, his master's in mining engineering and industrial engineering and management and his doctoral work in 1994, all from Indian Institute of Technology (Indian School of Mines), Dhanbad.

He joined Tata Steel in 1984 as an assistant manager. In 1987, he joined the Central Institute of Mining and Fuel Research as a scientist, and joined the Indian School of Mines as assistant professor in 1992. In 1998, he was promoted to professor and in September 2011, he became the director of the institute.

== Publications ==
- D. C. Panigrahi (2001). Mine Environment and Ventilation. Oxford & IBH Pub, 2001. ISBN 8120414586.
- D. C. Panigrahi (2009). Ninth International Mine Ventilation Congress: New Delhi, India, 10-13 November, 2009 : Technical Papers, Poster Session. Oxford & IBH Publishing Company, 2009.
