= Shree Dev Vyadeshwar =

Clan Deity in Hinduism

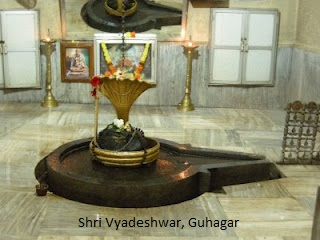
- The sanctum with the central icon of the linga of Shiva

Religion
- Affiliation: Hinduism
- District: Ratnagiri

Location
- State: Maharashtra
- Country: India
- Interactive map of Shree Dev Vyadeshwar
- Coordinates: 17.47°N 73.2°E

Shree Dev Vyadeshwar temple is a temple dedicated to the Hindu god Shiva. It is in Guhagar town from Ratnagiri District of Maharashtra State in India. The deity is considered as the Kuladevata (Clan-deity) of many Chitpavan families from the Konkan region.

Audio file of Shri Vyadeshwar Aarti
Audio file of Shri Vyadeshwar Aarti

Video of Shri Vyadeshwar Aarti being performed in the evening session

== Legend ==
Sage Parashurama created the land of Konkan by shooting his arrow into the sea and commanding the Sea God to retract the waters to the point where his arrow landed. This new land came to be known as Sapta-Konkana, meaning "piece of earth", "corner of earth", or "piece of a corner", derived from Sanskrit words: koṇa (कोण, corner) + kaṇa (कण, piece).

Shree Parshurama also requested 60 rishis to settle in the newly created land and protect the resident clans. He, being a devotee of the God Shiva, requested Shree Shiva to meet him daily. Sage Vyadi installed the lingam of Shiva at this temple in Guhagar. The Shiva icon and temple was thus named as Shree Vyadeshwar (the Lord of Vyadi). It is believed that Shree Shiva stays here in the invisible form.

Shree Vyadeshwar Deity was lost to time and is rediscovered in the era of King Sakuran, when the current temple structure was built. The temple is constructed between 1st and 2nd century, which makes it around 2000 years old

== Style ==
The architectural style is called 'Panchayatan'. A Panchayatan temple contains four subordinate shrines in four corners and the main shrine in the center of the podium, which forms the base. Here, Shiva is Shree Vyadeshwar, the central shrine, with Surya, Ganesha, Amba or Ambika (Shiva's consort) and Vishnu with his wife Lakshmi as the South-East, South-West, North-West and North-East subordinate shrines respectively. Nandi (the vahana of Shiva) sits in front of the main shrine.

The temple has three entrances to the east, west and south. Shri Garuda (the vahana of Vishnu) and Shri Hanuman are installed on either sides of the East entrance, inside the temple.

== Renovations ==
This 'Panchayatan' temple is ancient, as are its deities. Due to aging, the three shrines were found eroded. In May 2015, the shrines of Shri Parvati (Ambikamata), Shri Garud and Shri Hanuman were ceremonially replaced by new shrines. Also the shrine of Shri Suryanarayan was replaced later. All the required reinstatement rituals were systematically performed. The old entrance facing due East was small in size and was inconvenient. That entrance (Mahadwar in local Marathi language) was replaced with a completely renovated gate, during the recent renovation of the temple.

== Gallery ==
Following are the relevant photographs:

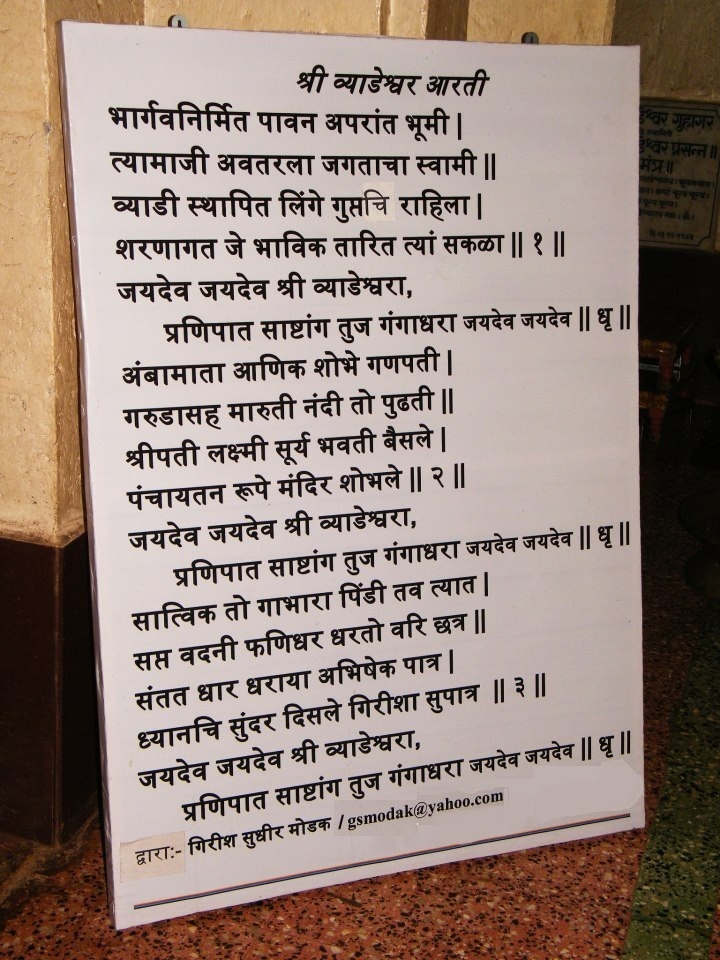
Official Shri Vyadeshwar Aarti

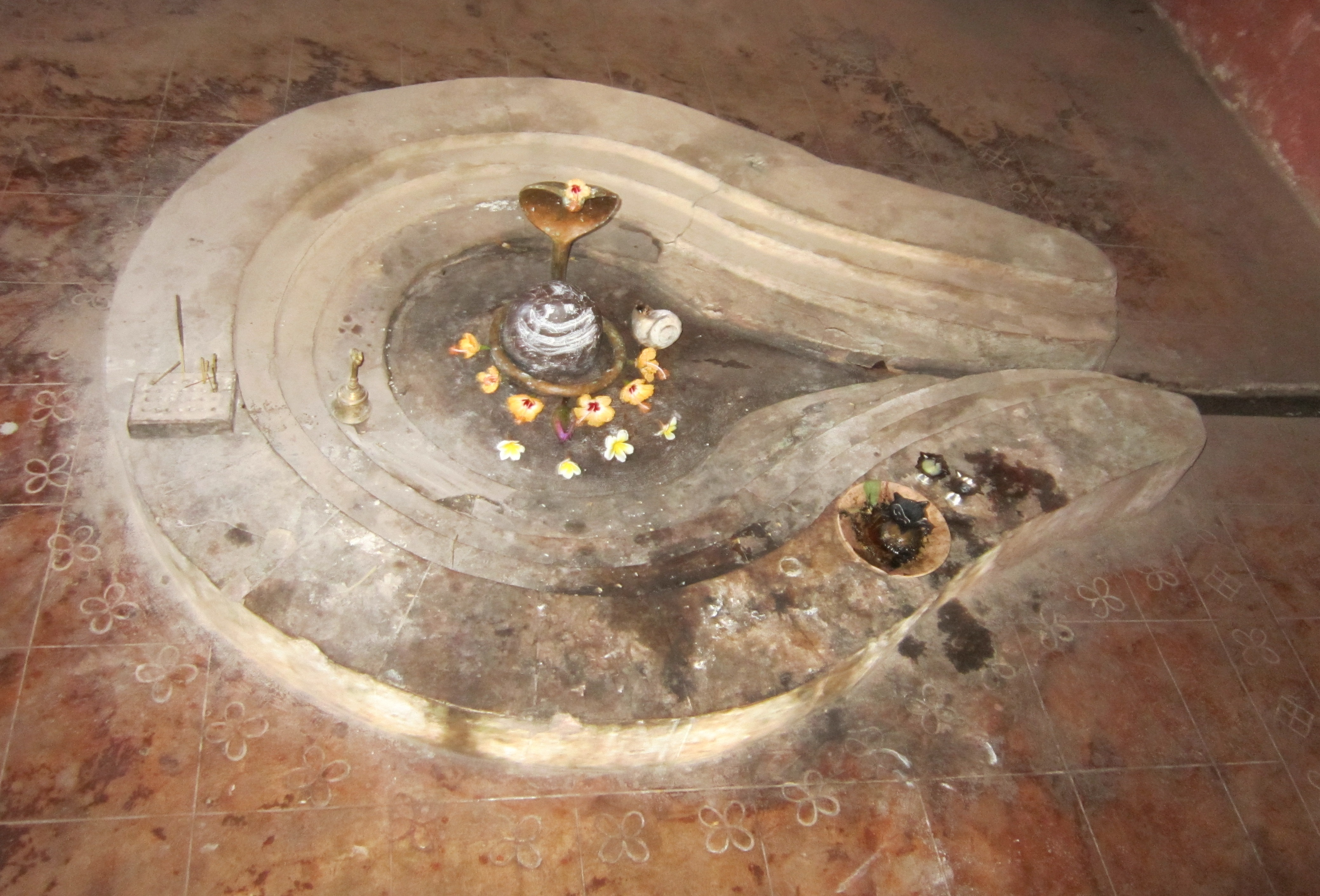
Shri Talkeshwar

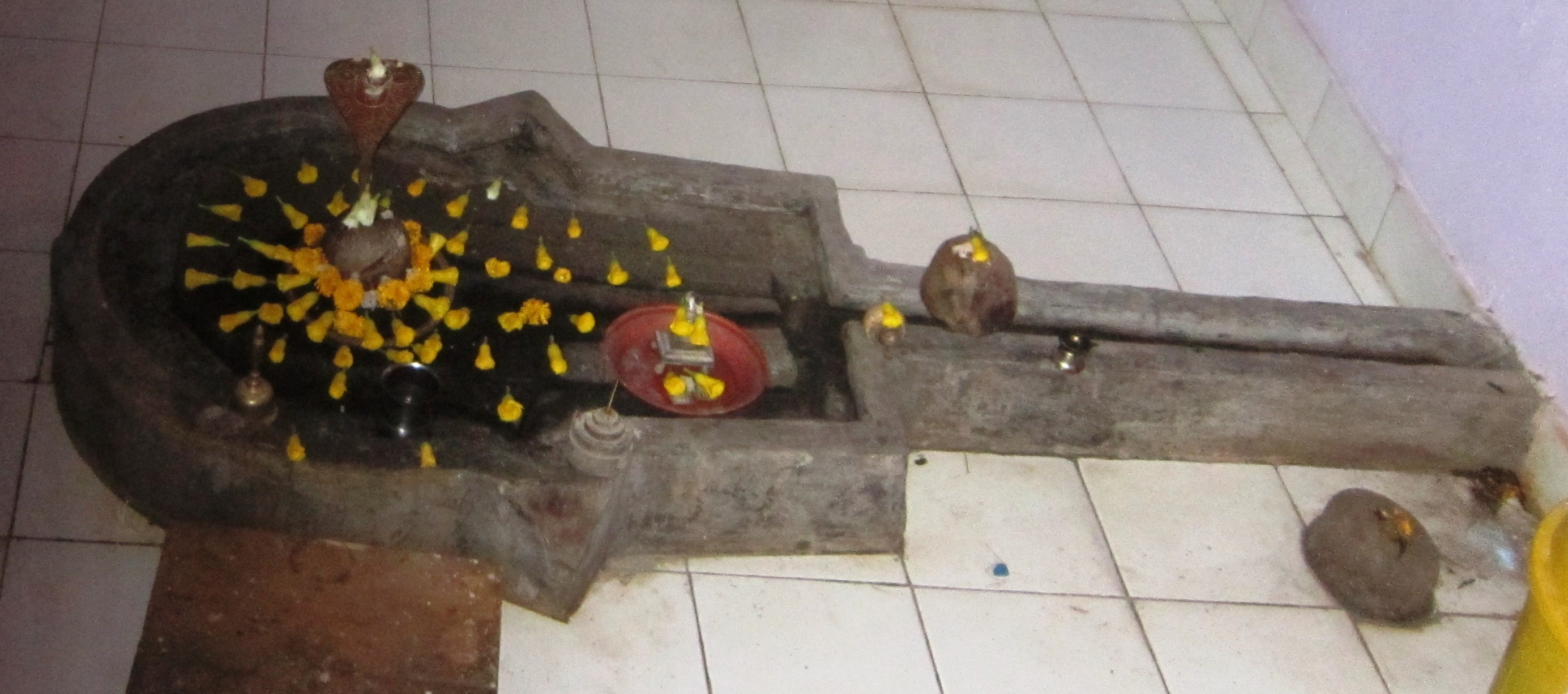
Shri Balkeshwar

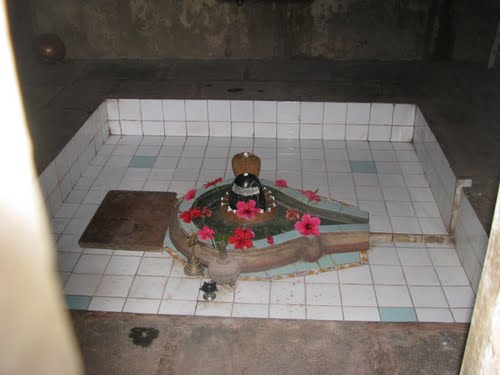
Shri Uddalakeshwar

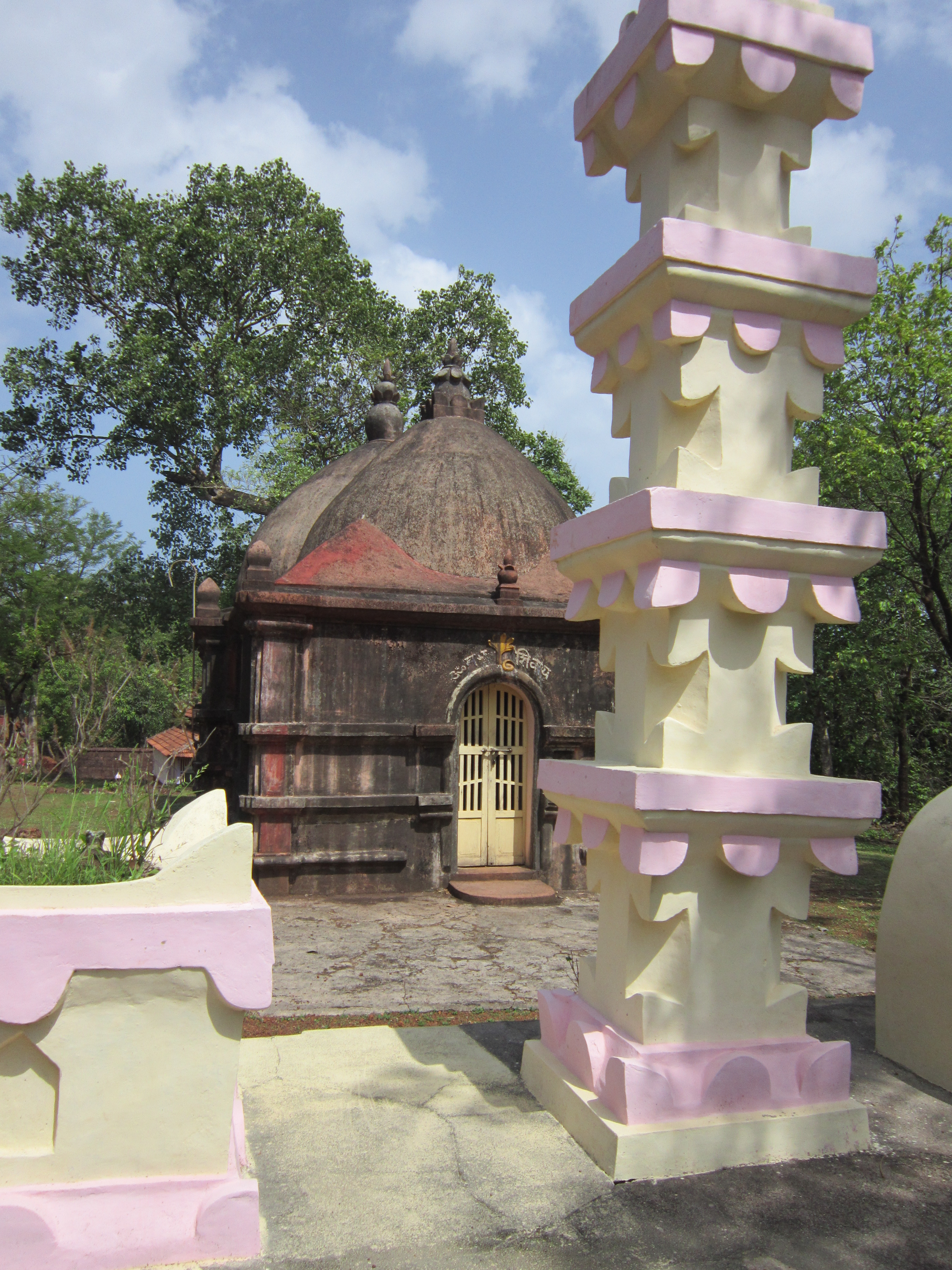
Shri Talkeshwar Mandir

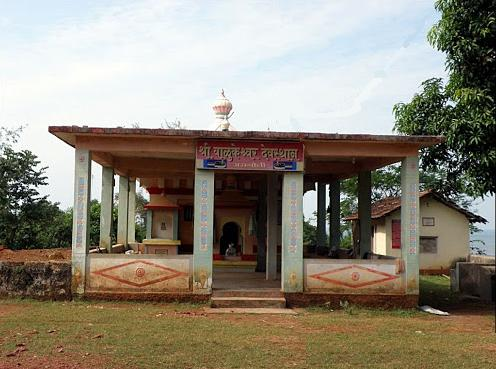
Shri valukeshwar mandir

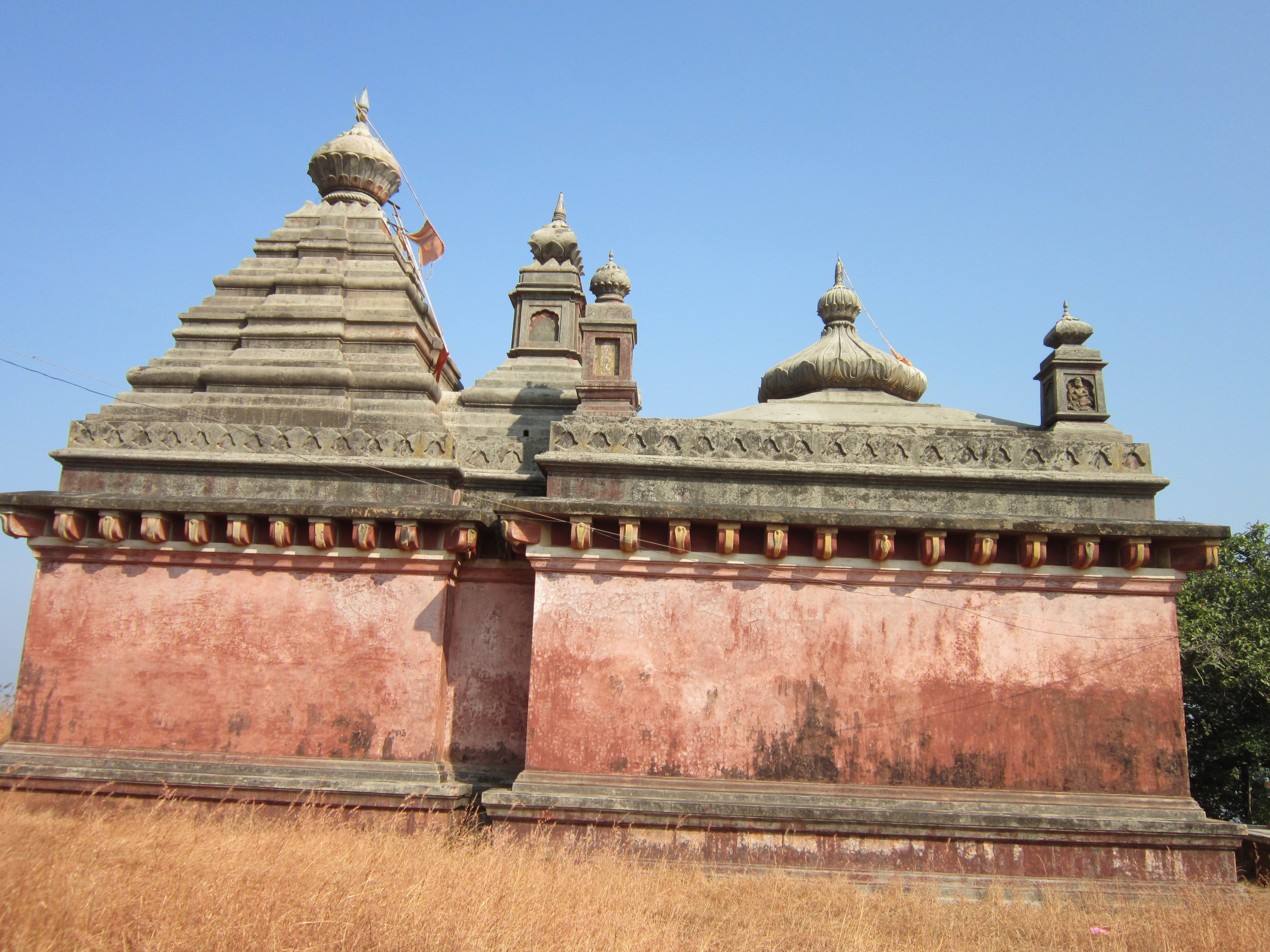
Shri Uddalakeshwar Mandir

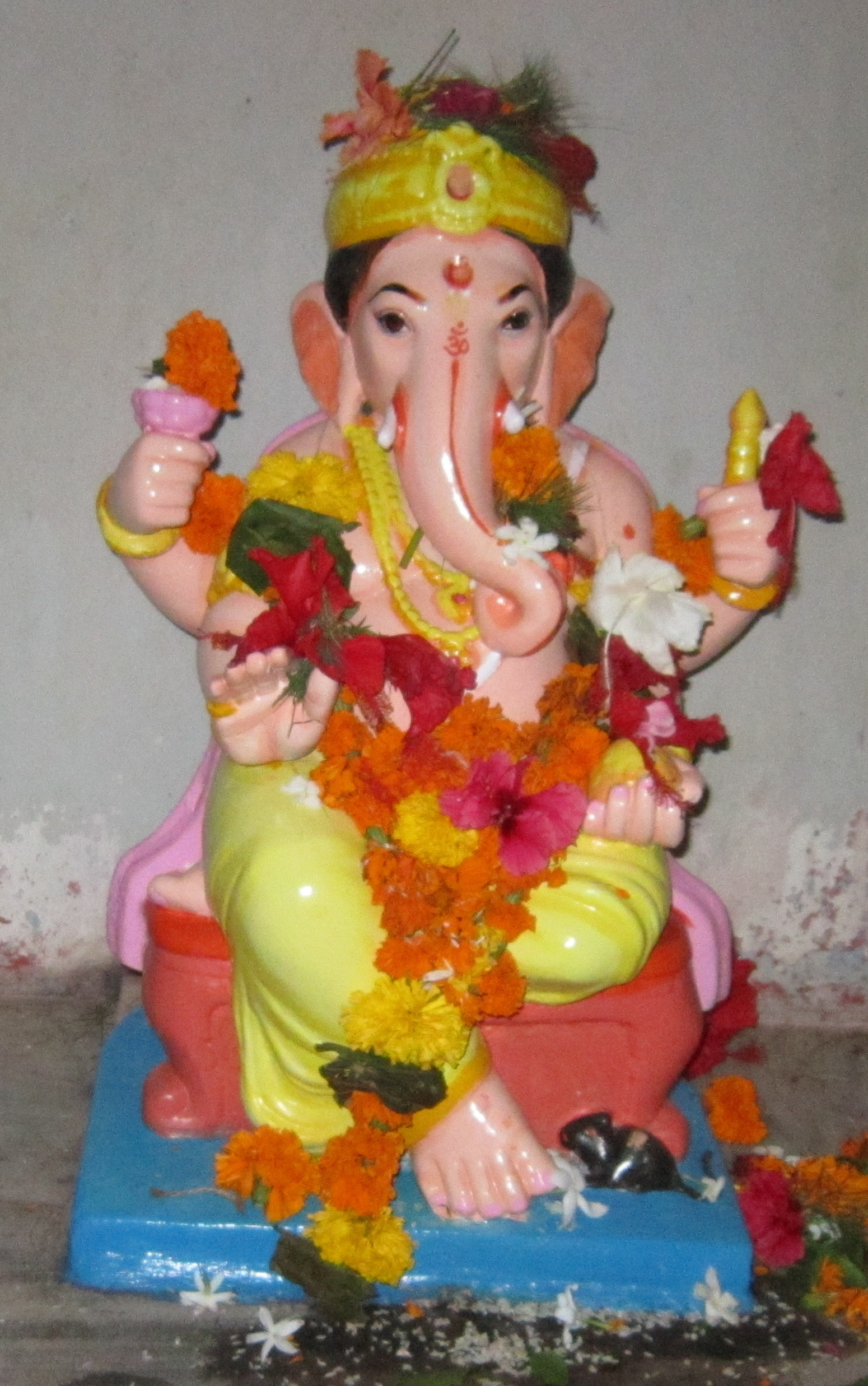
Shri Ganesh from shri vyadeshwar Panchayatan

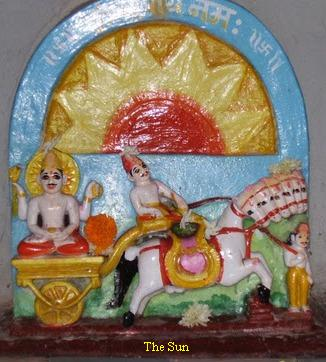
The Sun from shri vyadeshwar Panchayatan

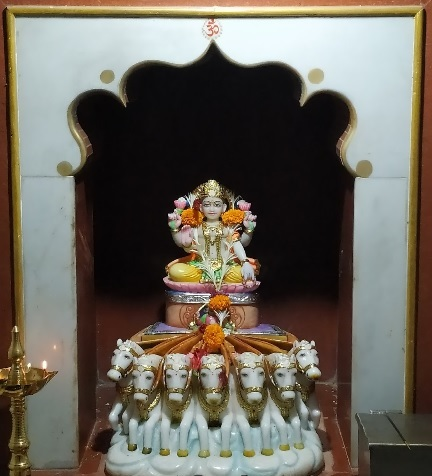
New Idol of Shri Suryanarayan

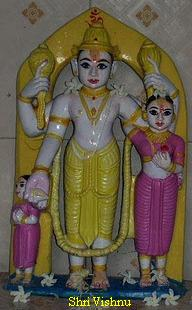
Shri Vishnu from shri vyadeshwar Panchayatan

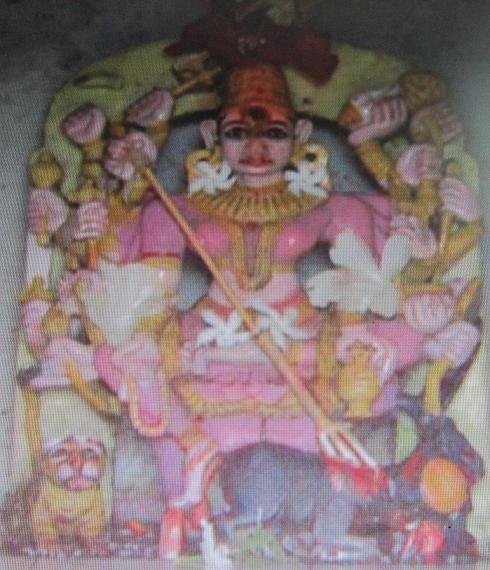
Shri Ambika Mata

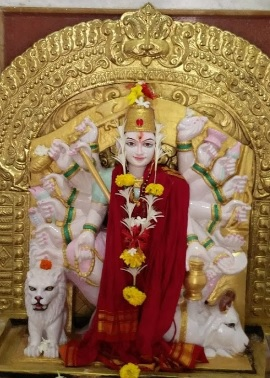
Shri Amba from Shri Vyadeshwar Panchayatan

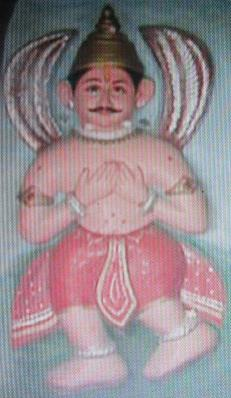
Shri Garud

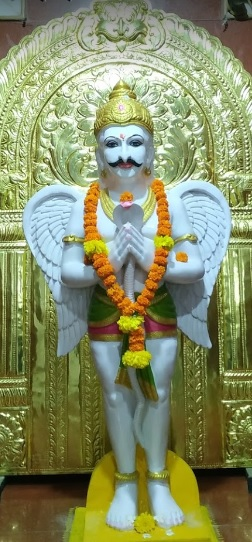
New Idol of Shri Garud from Shri Vyadeshwar Panchayatan

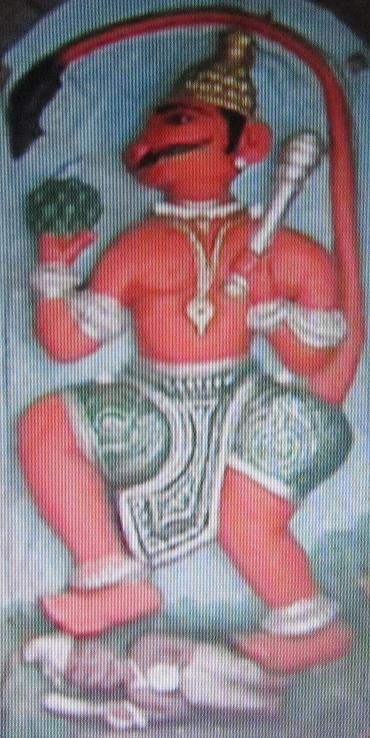
Shri Maruti

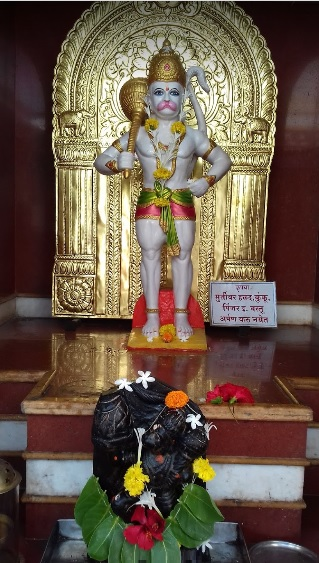
New Idol of Shri Hanuman

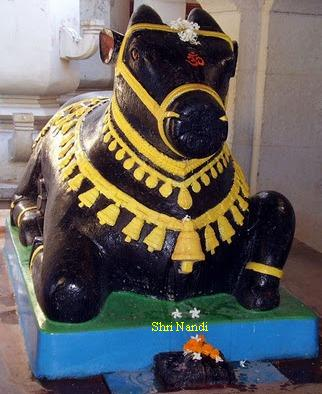
Shri Nandi

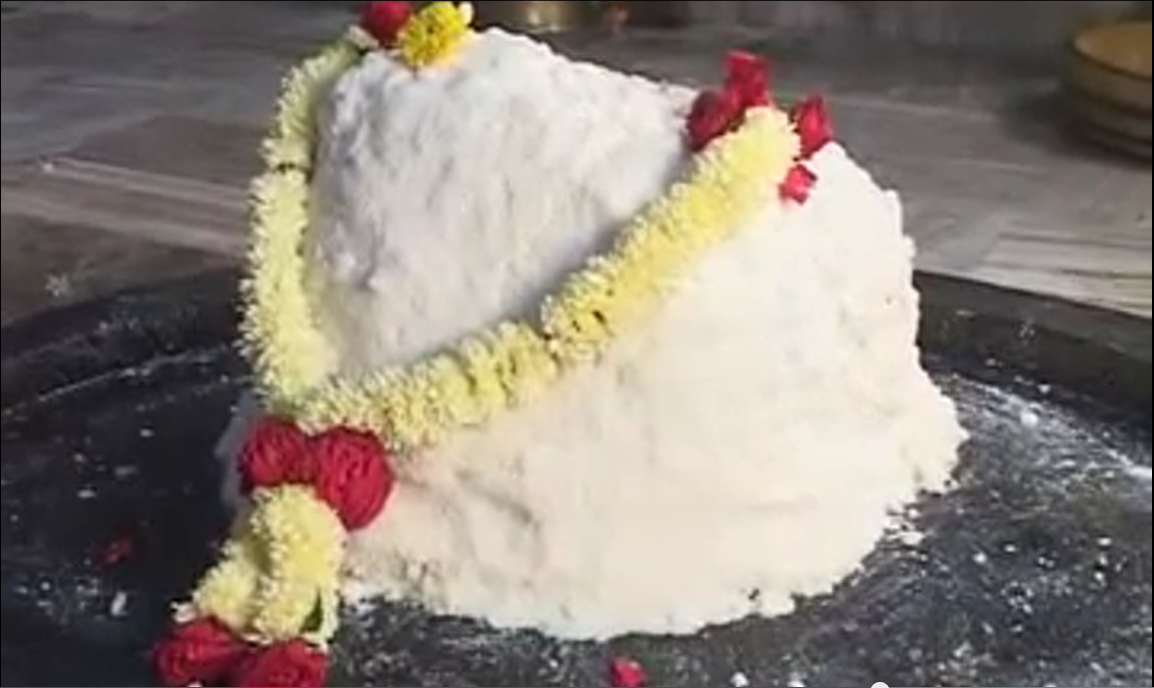
Shri Vyadeshwar dahibhat limpan

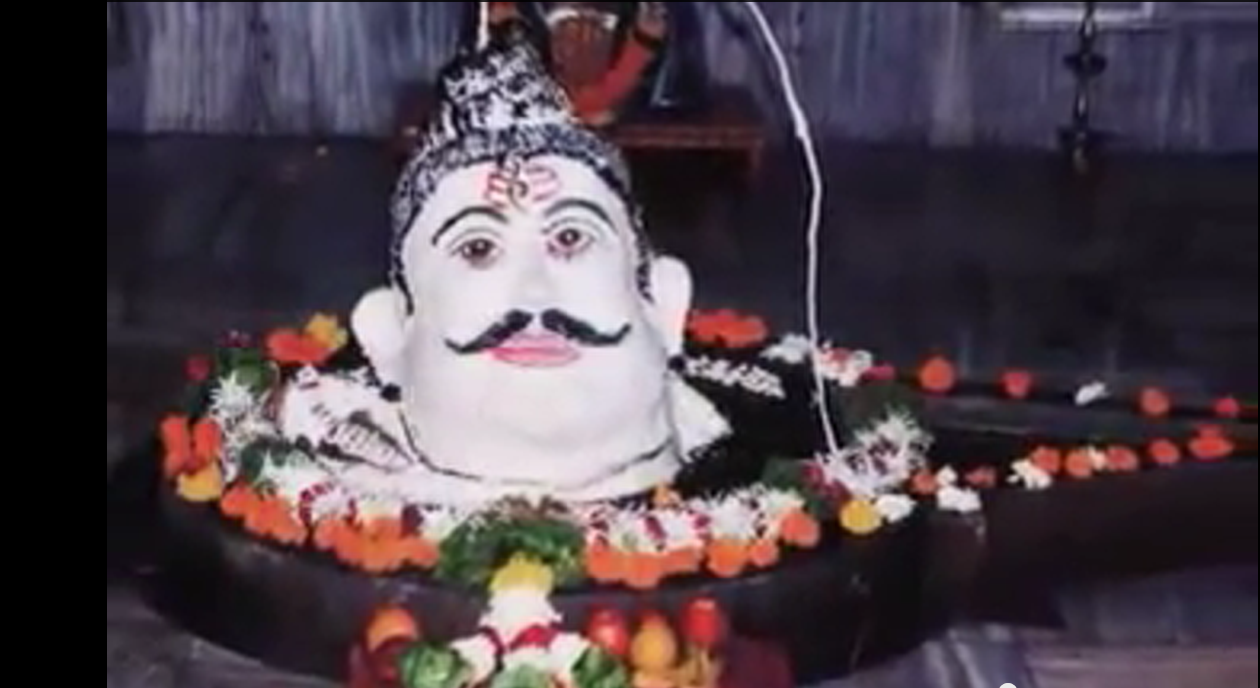
Decorated Pindi with dahibhat limpan

== See also ==
- Velneshwar
- Parshurama
- Kashyap
- Harihareshwar
