= Indapur, Raigad =

Village in Maharashtra, India

Indapur
- Village
- Location in Maharashtra, India Indapur (India)
- Coordinates: 18°18′23″N 73°14′20″E
- Country: India
- State: Maharashtra
- District: Raigad

Languages
  - Official: Marathi
- Time zone: +5:30
- Area code: 02140

Indapur is a village located on the Mumbai-Goa Highway in India. Indapur comes under the Mangaon taluka of Raigad district. Talashet is the gram panchayat of Indapur village. The sub-district headquarters, Mangaon (tehsildar office), is 10 km away, and the district headquarters, Alibag, is 73 km away.

== About Indapur ==
Indapur is quite well equipped with all the basic amenities as it is situated on highway. A weekly market is assembled on every Friday on Indapur-Tala road. The locality is a mixture of Adivasi, farmers and small business peoples with prominent language being spoken is Marathi. Cleanliness and education programs are conducted on gram panchayat level to improve and promote quality of life and social development. The only college is G.M. Vedak Institute of Technology (affiliated to University of Mumbai), located on Indapur-Tala road.

India's first National Highway Steel Slag Road section on NH- 66 Mumbai-Goa National Highway was inaugurated in January 2024. A 1 km section of Indapur-Panvel was constructed by JSW Steel. NHAI is upgrading Mumbai Goa up to 4 lanes. 84 km Panvel-Indapur stretch is being developed by NHAI, the remaining 355 km stretch is being widened by the state PWD.

Villages near Indapur

- Talashet
- Tala
- Nilaj
- Wave Diwali
- Makti
- Potner
- Rudravali
- Nagroli
- Nivi
- Muthavali Tarf Tale
- Umaroli Diwali
- Kashene

== Nearby attractions ==
- Raigad Fort
- Mahabaleshwar
- Devkund Waterfall
- Kundalika River
- Murud Janjira Fort
- Murud Beach
- Alibaug Beach
- Talagad
- Lavasa City
- Harihareshwar

== Connectivity ==
- Indapur Railway Station: 1.5 km
- Mangaon: 10 km
- Mumbai: 132 km
- Pune: 113 km
