= Revdanda Fort =

Fort in India

- Raigad district, Maharashtra

Site information
- Type: Island fort
- Owner: Government of India
- Open to the public: Yes
- Condition: Ruins

Location
- Shown within Maharashtra
- Location within Maharashtra
- Coordinates: 18°32′49.8″N 72°55′39.7″E

Site history
- Built: 1524
- Built by: Captain Soj
- Materials: Stone

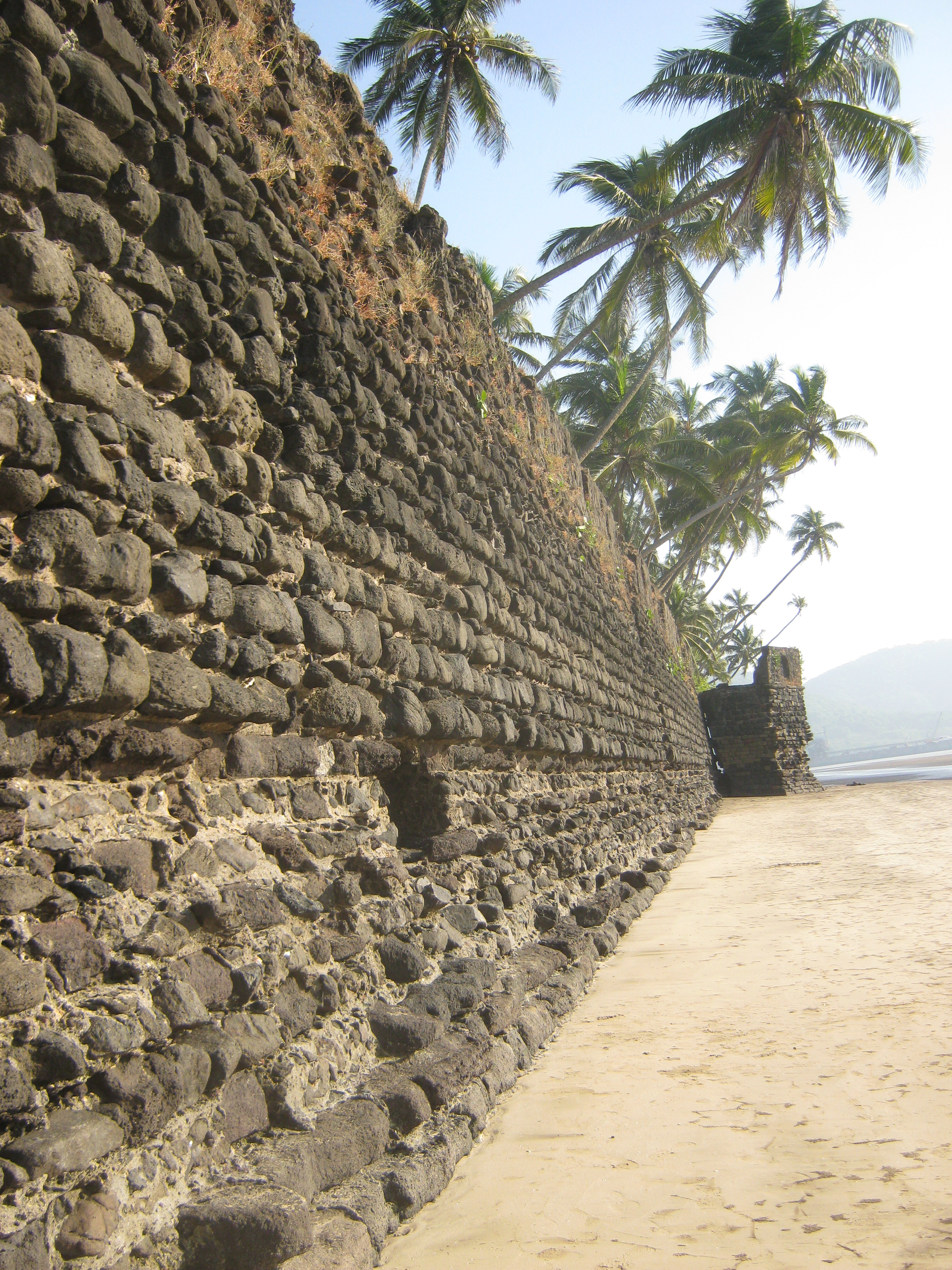
Outer walls of Revdanda fort as seen from Revdanda beach.

Revdanda Fort (in Portuguese "Fortaleza de Chaul") is located in Revdanda, Chaul, Maharashtra, India.

The fort is located at the mouth of the Kundalika River. It is easily accessible by road. The Alibag-Murud road passes through the fort. Earlier the fort was guarded on three sides by creek water. The main entrance is from the southern side.

== History ==
This fort was built by Portuguese Capt. Soj, and completed in 1524. It was in the control of Portuguese till 1740 when it was captured by Marathas. Finally it was captured by British in 1818.

The legendary "Battle of Chaul" took place near the mouth of the Chaul harbour between the Portuguese and the Muslim armies for control of trade.

Mother of God Church, Revdanda fort walls (Catholic Franciscan order): Between 1550 and 1580, Fr. Brás Dias built a country residence with a chapel dedicated to St. Blaise, which he donated to the Recollect Franciscans around 1570–71. The Franciscans re-consecrated the chapel to the Mother of God (A Madre de Deus) and established a convent that became the principal landmark in the suburban area known as the Small Field of Chaul (Campo Pequeno de Chaul) or the Field of St. Sebastian (Campo de São Sebastião).

Following the Maratha siege of 1739, Portugal ceded Chaul and Morro de Chaul by the Treaty of Poona dated 18 September 1740; the forts were delivered shortly afterwards.

After the Maratha takeover around 1740, Peshwa Madhav Rao allowed the Christians in 1764, given as an inam to their Marian deity, for a nine-day festival. They were also allowed a salvo of 3 guns salute, as well as permission for the construction of the Our Lady of Mount Carmel church in Korlai, across the river.
