= Jama Mosque, Furus =

Mosque in Furus, Maharashtra, India

Jama Mosque
- Location of the mosque in Maharashtra

Religion
- Affiliation: Islam
- Ecclesiastical or organizational status: Friday mosque
- Status: Active

Location
- Location: Furus Navanagar Road, Furus, Ratnagiri, Maharashtra
- Country: India
- Interactive map of Jama Mosque
- Coordinates: 17°44′17″N 73°19′28″E

Architecture
- Type: Mosque architecture

Specifications
- Dome: One
- Materials: Masonry

The Jama Mosque, also known as the Jaama Masjid, is a Friday mosque, located in Furus, in the Ratnagiri district of the state of Maharashtra, India.

The courtyard of the mosque can hold up to 500 worshipers. The mosque is a very simple, bold, vast and majestic in its expression. It is crowned by large dome made up of masonry cement. There are inscriptions in the mosque on the gateway.

== See also ==
- Islam in India
- List of mosques in India
