= Revdanda =

Village in Maharashtra

- Village
- Location in Maharashtra, India Revdanda (India)
- Coordinates: 18°33′N 72°56′E
- Country: AlibagIndia
- State: Maharashtra
- District: Raigad
- Established: 1521
- Founder: Dom Lourenço de Almeida

Government
  - Body: Gram panchayat
- Demonym: Revdankar(kotkar)

Languages
  - Native: Konkani and Kristi
  - Official: Marathi
- Time zone: UTC+5:30 (IST)
- Postal code: 402203
- Nearest city: Alibag, Murud, Roha

Revdanda is a village near Alibaug, Raigad District, Maharashtra. It is the site of the medieval 'Chaul harbor'.

== Directions ==
India. It is connected through a coastal highway (Sagari Mahamarg) 17 km (11 mi) away from Alibag, 125 km (78 mi) away from Mumbai, 37 km away from Roha and 33 km away from Murud.

Until a few years ago the coastal road that goes south from Alibag used to terminate at Revdanda where it encountered the Kundalika creek. A bridge now spans the creek and the whole stretch southward of Revdanda up to Murud-Janjira has now become accessible. Part of the town is situated within the premises of Revdanda Fort, an old Portuguese fort.

== History ==
The history of Revdanda and the surrounding villages are quite similar to Chaul, due to their close proximity to the town.

=== Muslim Rule ===
In 1490 the area fell under the Ahmadnagar Sultanate.

=== Portuguese Era ===
In 1505, Portuguese commander Dom Lourenço de Almeida defeated the Muslims and conquered the area around Chaul. In 1508, Venetian mercenaries along with the Mamluk navy had allied with Sultanate of Gujarat and defeated the Portuguese in the Battle of Chaul. The first Portuguese settlement at Chaul took place in 1521 with the construction of the first fort on the south bank of the Kundalika River. In October 1531, the Portuguese erected a new square stone fortress, named Santa Maria do Castello, which contained a church and dwellings for 120 men. A village developed around the fortress, which is now called Revdanda. A 1558 treaty precluded fortifying the town.

=== Maratha Era ===
The Marathas led constant raids against their neighbors, for more land and wealth. Chaul and Revdanda fell to the Marathas during the Battle of Bassein. After the successful campaign by the Marathas, the tower bells from the local churches had been taken as victory symbols and came to be installed in temples. They also gave out parcels of land to their subjects.

Mother of God Church, Revdanda fort walls (Catholic Franciscan order): Between 1550 and 1580, Fr. Brás Dias built a country residence with a chapel dedicated to St. Blaise, which he donated to the Recollect Franciscans around 1570–71. The Franciscans re-consecrated the chapel to the Mother of God (A Madre de Deus) and established a convent that became the principal landmark in the suburban area known as the Small Field of Chaul (Campo Pequeno de Chaul) or the Field of St. Sebastian (Campo de São Sebastião). After the Maratha victory around 1740, Peshwa Madhav Rao (Nanasaheb) allowed the Christians in 1764, as an inam to their Marian deity for a nine-day festival. They were also allowed a salvo of 3 guns salute, and the permission for the construction of the Our Lady of Mount Carmel church in Korlai, across the river. The Church of Our Lady of Mount Carmel (Nossa Senhora do Monte Carmo) in Korlai was built on a small promontory in the Korlai (Corlaim) village between 1740-1770 & is among one of the oldest churches in India. Today, a Catholic population of Creole Portuguese speakers' of approximately 1000 inhabitants remain in the neighbouring Korlai village, apart from the diaspora scattered across Mumbai and beyond.

=== British Era ===
Revdanda became a British territory after they successfully defeated the Marathas in 1818, and took control of the confederacy.

== Notability ==
=== Portuguese Fortresses ===
The Fort of Santa Maria do Castello is one of two 16th-century fortresses built by the Portuguese, in the area around Tschoul - The other being Korlai Fort.

=== Portuguese Church ===
It is where St. Francis Xavier delivered one of his early sermons in India. The Church of St. Barbara still exists, but in a run down condition. The church is within the walled fort, on the south side and not far from the main road.

=== Russian presence ===
Revdanda came into limelight when Russian historians found out that the first Russian traveller to India landed in Revdanda. A monument was raised in his memory on 23 November 2000. A foundation stone for the monument in memory of Afanasy Nikitin, the first Russian traveller to India was laid at Revdanda. A high level delegation from Russia, accompanied by Mr. V.T. Trubnikov, the first deputy of the minister of Foreign Affairs of the Russian Federation, H.E. Mr. A.M. Kadakin, Ambassador of the Russian Federation to India, all senior diplomats from the Consulate General of the Russian Federation in Mumbai, attended the function. .

=== Indian Jewry ===
Revdanda is one of the most important places of Konkan, Maharashtra for the Indian Jewish community. Almost 700 years ago after the destruction of the Holy Temple of Israel in Biblical era, a group of Jews who already knew about India and had been in contact with India. This group of people arrived in Nagão which is 8 km north of Revdanda. They adopted Indian culture, names, lifestyle and founded an Indian Jewish community.

=== Temple ===
Datta Mandir located in the Chaul part of Revdanda. It is a temple dedicated to Datta, who is mainly worshipped by Marathi immigrants to the Konkan. The temple is situated at the top of the peak with almost 1500 steep stairs to be climbed to reach the peak. The entire region around the Revdanda can be viewed from the temple. The temple is said to have been built during Shivaji's reign to keep an eye out for hostile forces.

The red-domed temple of Datta Mandir situated at the hill top is said to have been constructed by a Swami Bramhendra. The temple has a three-headed statue of ShriDatta and this idol represents the trinity of Lord Brahma, Vishnu and Maheshwara.

== See also ==
- Battle of Diu
- Chaul
- Battle of Chaul
- Siege of Chaul (1570–1571)
- Siege of Chaul (1594)
- Maratha–Portuguese War (1683–1684)
