= Furus =

Village in Maharashtra

Furus Phuroos Furoos
- Village
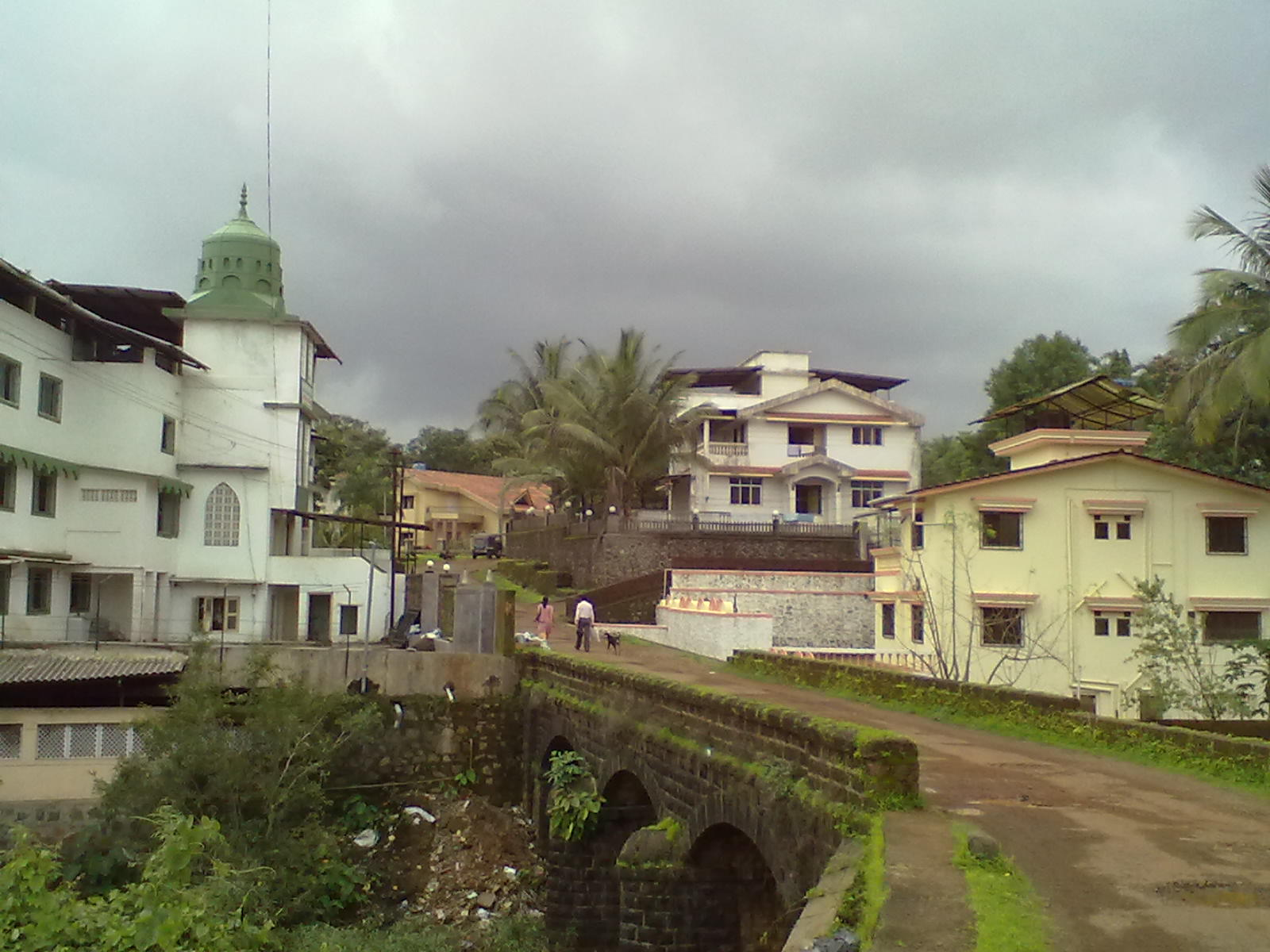

- Location in Maharashtra, India Furus; Phuroos; Furoos (India)
- Coordinates: 17.70°N 73.35°E
- Country: India
- State: Maharashtra
- Division: Konkan
- District: Ratnagiri
- Taluka: Khed

Government
  - Sarpanch: Mrs Rukaya Liyakat Sunge
  - MLA: Mr Yogesh Kadam
  - MP: Mr Sunil Tatkare

Area
  - Total: 10.62 km^{2} (4.10 sq mi)

Population (2011)
  - Total: 3,255
  - Density: 306.5/km^{2} (793.8/sq mi)

Languages
  - Official: Konkani, Marathi, Urdu, Hindi, English
- Time zone: UTC+5:30 (IST)
- PIN: 415710
- Telephone code: 02356
- Literacy: 77.29%
- Climate: humid (Köppen)

Furus also known as Phuroos or Furoos, is a village in Khed, Ratnagiri district, Maharashtra state in Western India. The 2011 Census of India recorded a total of 3255 residents in the village with total area of 1,062.35 ha (2,625.1 acres). It is predominantly populated by Konkani Muslims along with Hindu and Buddhist. Furus is believed to have been named by Persians who came here to trade in horses (Arabic: فُرُوْسِيَّة, romanized: Furūsiyyah / Persian: فارسی, romanized: Fārsī). The main language spoken in Furus is Kokni (not to be confused with Goan Konkani), a blend of Bankoti, Sangameshwari and Marathi infused with words of Arabic, Urdu and Persian.

== History ==
Since antiquity, the Konkan coast has had maritime mercantile relations with major ports on the Red Sea and the Persian Gulf. Konkani Muslims can trace their ancestry to traders from Hadhramaut (in Yemen or South Arabia), some who fled from Kufa in the Euphrates' valley circa 700 CE, North India (Haryana or Punjab), as well as various regions of Arabia and the broader Middle East. Others arriving as traders or mercenaries. By the 10th century, Ceul (Chaul), Dabhol had a significant Muslim presence, with mosques and self-governance. Subsequent waves of migration were driven by upheavals, like the Karmatian revolt (923–926 CE) and Mongol invasions (1258 CE). Despite the prominence of Chaul and Dabhol under the Ahmadnagar Kingdom (1490–1626), Muslim rule was never firmly established in the Konkan, and forced conversions were absent. Most Konkani Muslims are thus of mixed foreign descent. According to Jalal al-Din al-Suyuti, Muslims first arrived in the Konkan region in 699 CE — less than 70 years after the death of Prophet Muhammad in 632 CE.

In the late 18th and early 19th centuries, Konkani Muslims became influential sailors, merchants, and government employees as the port city of Bombay (present Mumbai) began developing. Dr. B. R. Ambedkar is believed to have visited Furus on May 17, 1937, while en route to Dapoli, and spent the night at Buddhawadi, Furus.

== Location ==
Furus comes under the Konkan division of Maharashtra State. Furus is on State Highway SH104, between the towns of Khed and Dapoli. The closest train station is in Khed, about 12 kilometres (7.5 miles) away, and Dapoli is about 17 km (11 miles) from Furus. The village is next to a seasonal stream called the Nirgudi, and is surrounded by small hills. It gets a lot of rain during the monsoon season (June-Sep), and the temperature ranges between 15 and 40 degrees Celsius. Ratnagiri District is divided into three parts: Coastal, Middle, and Hilly. Furus lies in the Middle Zone, which has medium-height land and is easy to reach thanks to the Mumbai–Goa Highway and the Konkan railway.

== Political administration ==
Furus was part of erstwhile State of Bombay. Furus holds historical political significance as the native village of MLA Wajihuddin Ahmed Parkar, who was elected as a Member of the Legislative Assembly (MLA) for 1952 Bombay State Legislative Assembly election for Dapoli-Khed Constituency. He contested the election under banner of the Indian National Congress (INC) during the tenure of Jawaharlal Nehru as party president. Currently, Furus falls under the Raigad Lok Sabha Constituency and Dapoli Vidhan Sabha Constituency. The current MLA and MP representing Furus are mentioned below:

Year	Government Body	Position	Constituency	Party	Member
2024	Maharashtra Legislative Assembly	MLA	Dapoli	SS	Mr Yogesh Kadam
2024	Lok Sabha (Parliament)	MP	Raigad	NCP	Mr Sunil Tatkare

== Transportation ==
Furus is well-connected by road to nearby big towns. State Highway 104, Khed to Dapoli passes from Furus. Besides buses are also available as per their timings auto-rickshaw are available round-the clock.

== Educational facilities ==
Furus was one of the first townships in the area to have a high school. S.I. High School & Junior College of Science, Furus was founded by Advocate Wajihuddin Ahmed Parkar under a government initiative in 1938 (pre-independence time). The School was in Marathi medium named Anglo Vernacular High School and is still functional with semi English curriculum. Furus has following schools:

- Siraj-ul-Islam High School and Junior College
- CWS - Ideal English School
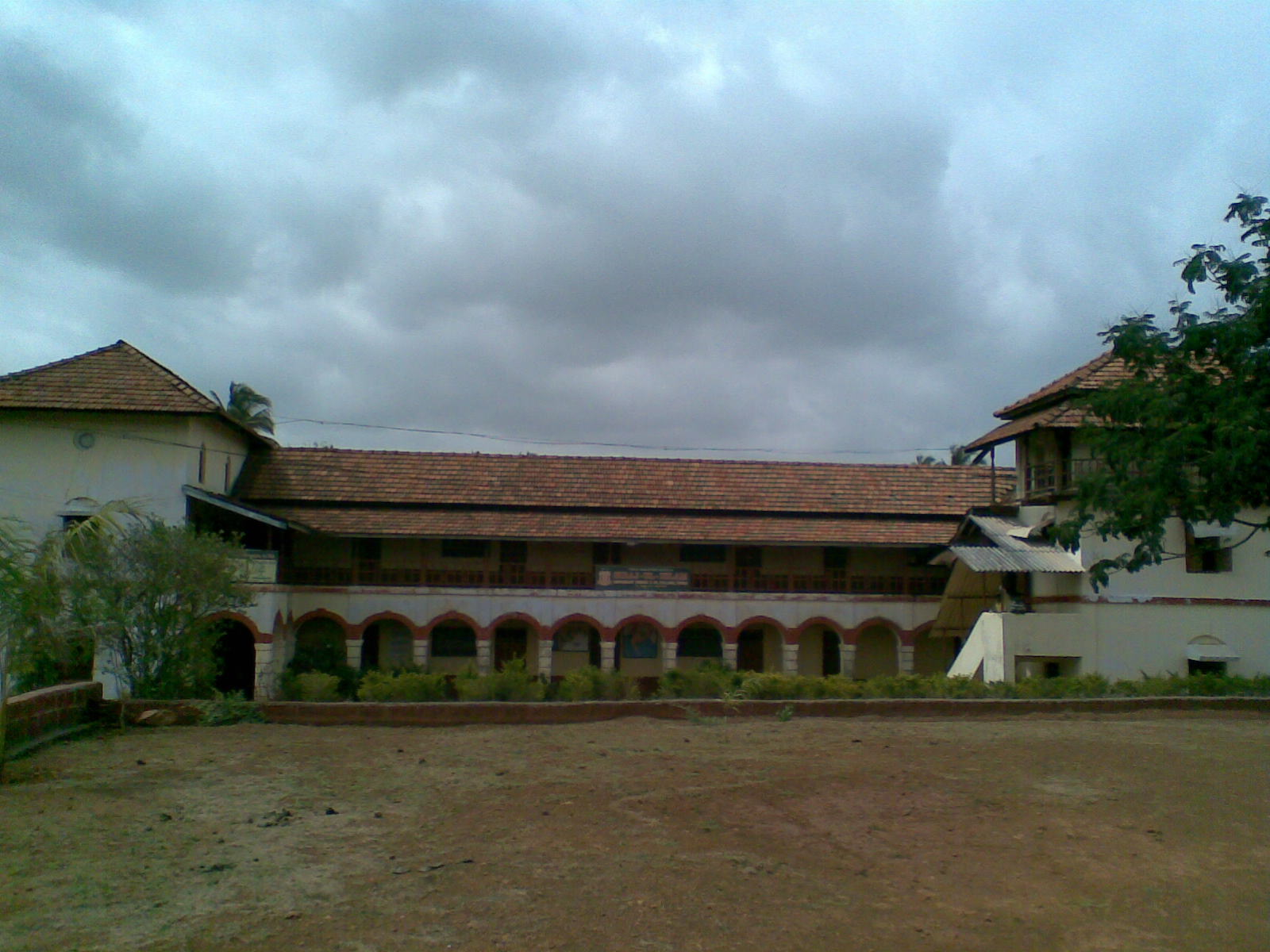
Siraj ul Islam High School & Junior College

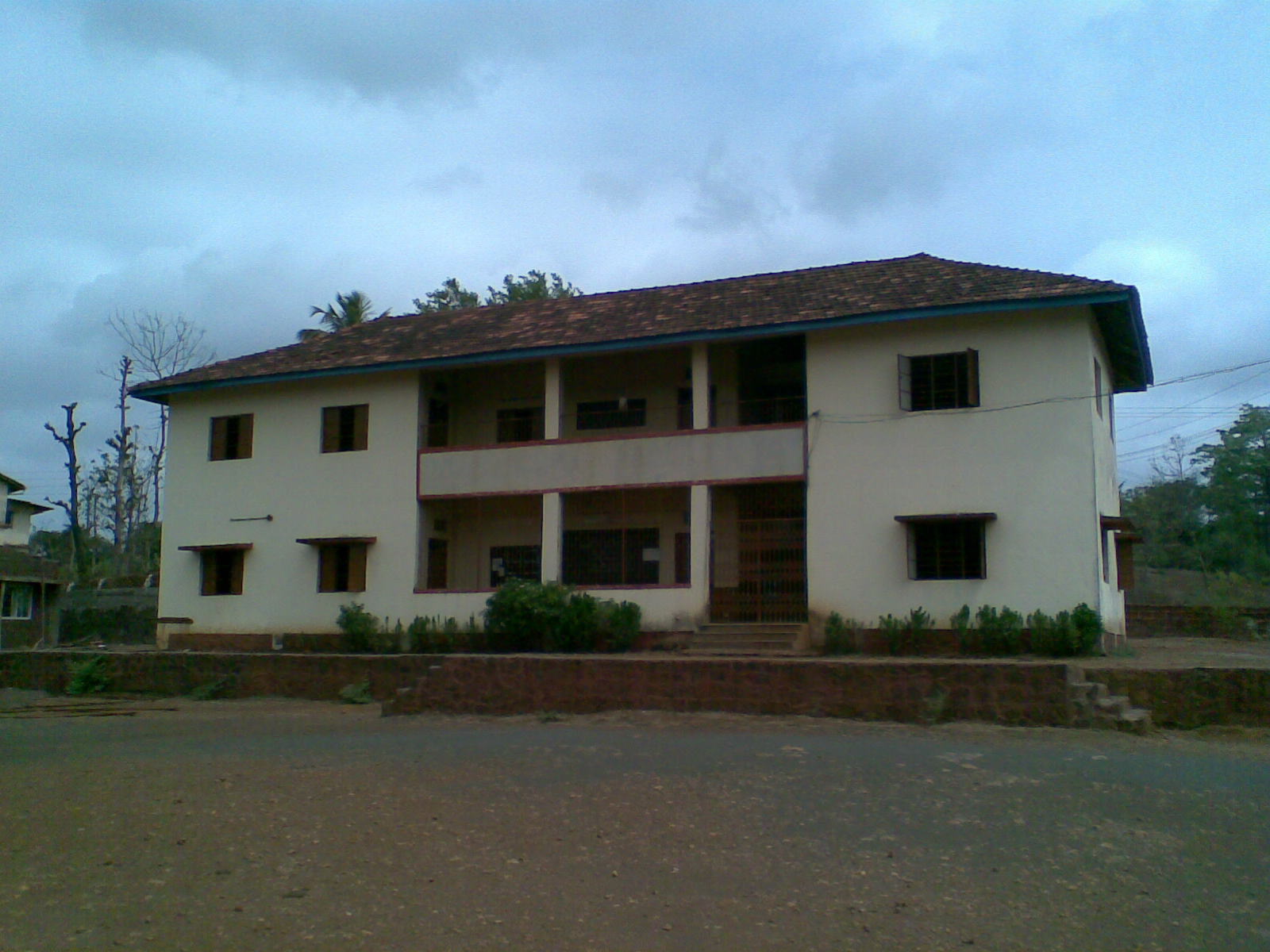
Siraj ul Islam Junior College of Science

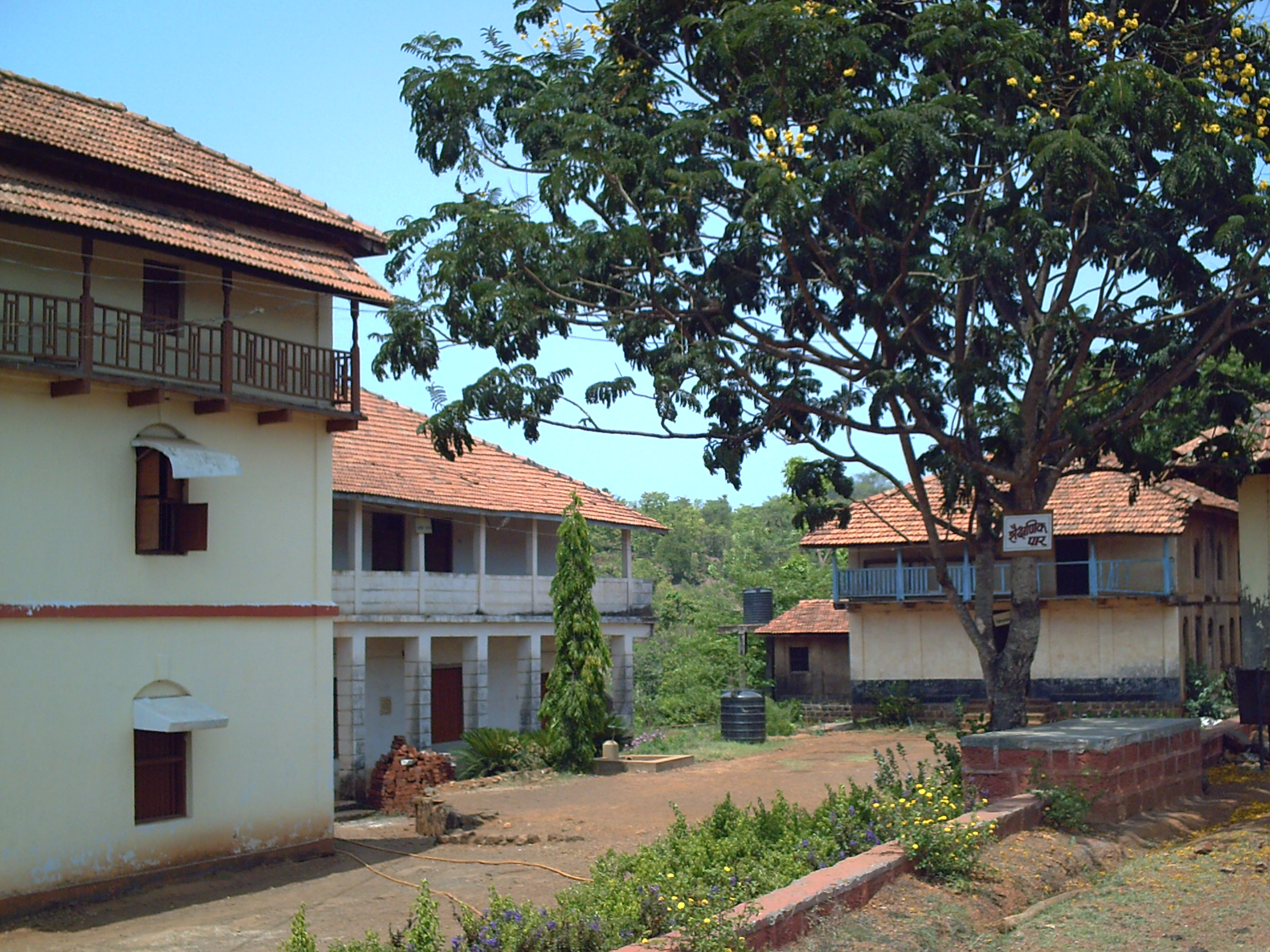
Siraj ul Islam Educational Campus

== Economy ==
Furus economy was hugely dependent on agricultural product till early 1980. Post 1980 most of the young earners head towards metro cities and hence agricultural production gets big hit in coming years. During the same period most of the people started to migrate to Gulf, UK, Canada, Australia, USA for the jobs. Presently 95% of Furus economy depend on remittance from foreign countries.

== Healthcare ==
Furus has government run Primary Health Center situated at Dayal Road. Apart from this Furus has one equipped private nursing home run by resident Dr. Antule and a small clinic run by visiting Dr. Chikhale.

== Demographics ==
Furus consist of 4 Sub-villages mentioned in Census 2011 viz., - Furus, Furus Gaonthan, Furus Amshet and Falsonda. Ratnagiri District and in particular Furus is one of the very few place in India whose sex ratio stood at 1210 Females per 1000 males which means the females population is higher than males.

Demographic details of Furus and Sub-Villages
Rows	Village	Area (hectare)	No. of household	Total Population	Male	Female	Sex Ratio M:F
1	Furus Amshet	73.25	140	577	238	339	1000:1424
2	Falsonda	50.4	210	1111	511	600	1000:1174
3	Furus	905.7	267	1129	535	594	1000:1110
4	Furus Gaonthan	33	104	438	189	249	1000:1317
5	Total	1062.35	721	3255	1473	1782	1000:1210

The main religions here are Islam, Hinduism and Buddhism. The Muslim community consists of 7 Sub Jamaats also called as Mohallas. They are:

- Choughan (चौगन) mohalla
- Fanaswad (फणसवाड)
- Tahtani (तहतानी) mohalla
- Tekdi (टेकडी) mohalla and
- Aathvi (आठवी) mohalla
- Falsonda (फल्सोंडा)
- Navanagar (नवानगर) mohalla
Literacy in Furus (Ratnagiri Census Handbook, 2011)
1. Literate Male 37.27 (36.9%)
2. Literate Female 40.22 (39.8%)
3. Illiterate Male 7.99 (7.91%)
4. Illiterate Female 15.53 (15.4%)

Buddhist reside at

- Buddhawadi (बौद्धवाडी)

Whereas people following Hinduism mostly reside at

- Nhavwadi (न्हाववाडी)
- Chougulewadi (चौगुलेवाडी)
- Gujarwadi (गुजरवाडी)
- Bhuleshwarwadi (भुलेश्वरवाडी)
- Kanganewadi (कांगणेवाडी)
- Rewalewadi (रेवाळेवाडी)

== See also ==
- Sapta Konkan
  - Western Ghats
