= Kundalika River =

River in India

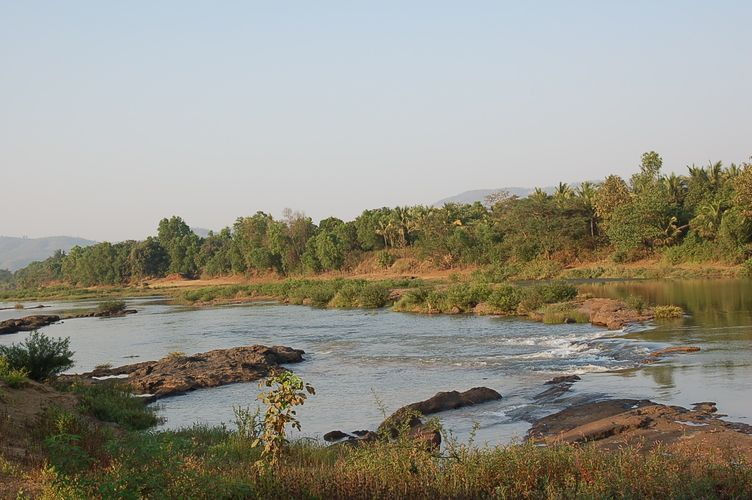

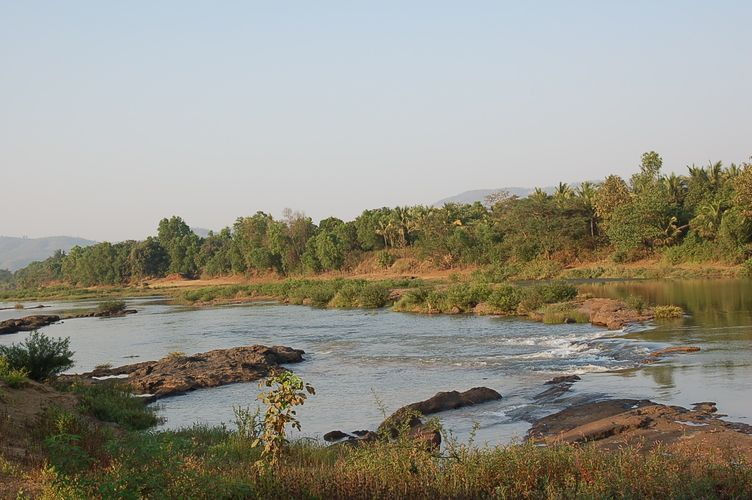
- Kundalika River

Location
- Country: India
- State: Maharashtra
- Tahsil: Mangaon

Physical characteristics
- Source: Bhira
  - location: Maharashtra, India
  - coordinates: 18.4566°N 73.3880°E
- Mouth
  - location: Mumbai, India
  - elevation: 0 m (0 ft)
- Discharge
  - location: mouth

The Kundalika is a small river flowing from the hills of Sahyadri to the Arabian Sea. This river originates at a small town called Bhira in Mangaon tahsil of the Raigad District of state of Maharashtra, 150 km south east of Bombay (Mumbai). The important towns located on the banks of Kundalika are Kolad, Korlai, Chaul, Roha and Salav.

== Details ==
River Kundalika is fed by the excess water from Tata Power's Mulshi Dam Project on to a series of hydroelectric projects and dams, including Ravalje followed by Bhira and then Dholvan, where the water is released in the morning typically at 6am. The gush of the water reaches Sutarwadi at 7:30am and water rises at Kolad at 10:00am.

A historical trade route called Savalya Ghat descends in Kundalika Valley from Tamhini Ghat Road. Beautifully carved staircases exist at some places, and there are two small water cisterns. This river was a means of trade in ancient times. There are many forts on the hills along the river, including Surgad, Avchitgad, Birwadi fort, Korlai fort and Revdanda.

On the bank of River Kundalika are many retreats and farm houses with mango and watermelon as the chief fruit product, and rice and nachni as the chief farm produce. The soil is very rich in minerals and water is ample via canals fed from River Kundalika's clean water.

Over 90% of Kundalika's water is consumed by industries, including RCF's THAL Project and many MIDC all across. This unfortunately has resulted in pollution, especially dues to Roha's chemical industries releasing a lot of effluents (chemical waste) in the river. On the cards are to use 9000 Quesecs of water by the upcoming Reliance and Essar's new projects in the Villa MIDC. This could kill the rafting besides considerably reducing the river's downstream water levels at Kolad. The river will die a little more and become more placid and shallower.

The Kundalika's water is beginning to get affected and "Save Kundalika Project" is being undertaken by "EcoMantra Nature Awareness and Travel", a local sustainable and community tourism organisation that runs a unique eco camp on its bank at Kolad.

Adventure lovers have found a unique way of enjoying the release of the dam water. Capitalising on the location near Mumbai, with its virtually unending source of adventure lovers, rafting is conducted on the river using the rapids generated by the rushing water released from the dam. Rafting of grade II and III can also be experienced over a 14 km circuit and can be enjoyed all day in the monsoon, or to coincide with the timing of the release of water from the dam during other times of the year. Rafting here is sometimes unavailable in the peak of summer, when the water becomes scarce.

== Bhira Hydroelectric Project ==
The Planning Commission has given investment clearance for the scheme "Upper Kundlika Project (Revised Medium) in Maharashtra". The project is estimated to cost Rs 154.916 crore (2009-10 price level). The plant's maximum output capacity is nominally 300 MW, generated by six 25 MW Pelton turbines and a 150 MW pumped storage generator added in 1997. In 2014 two 10 kW microturbine units were added to generate further power from the tailrace after the main turbines.

== Devkund Waterfall ==
Devkund Waterfall is a waterfall located near Bhira, in Raigad district. The waterfall is a type of 'plunge' waterfall in nature pouring in massive amounts of water on the rocky surface underneath of Kundalika river. Devkund Waterfall is a popular spot for one day picnics.
