= Devkund Waterfall =

Waterfall in Maharashtra, India

Devkund Waterfalls
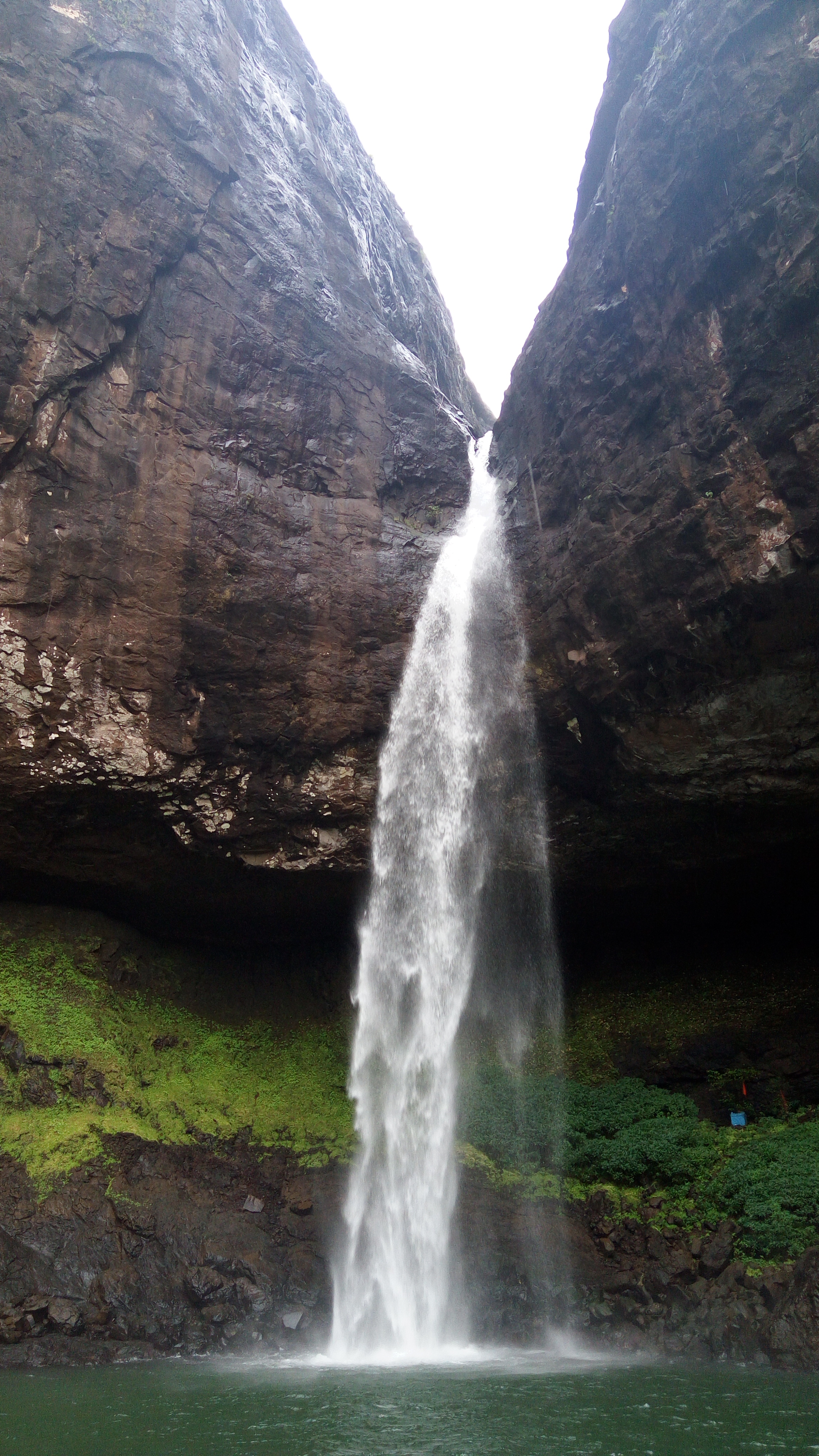
- Devkund Waterfall, Bhira, Dt. Raigad

- Location within India Location within Maharashtra
- Location: Bhira, Roha, Raigad, India
- Coordinates: 18°28′39″N 73°24′31″E
- Type: Plunge

Devkund Waterfall is a waterfall located near Bhira, in Raigad district, Maharashtra, India. It is a 'plunge' waterfall pouring massive amounts of water on the rocky surface underneath. It is a popular spot for one day picnics.

== Location ==
Devkund waterfall is located in Bhira Patnus and since it went viral on social media, it has become extremely crowded and dangerous. Several lives have been lost while amateurs try to visit this place on their own. It is the confluence of three waterfalls and is said to be the origin of Kundalika River. It is about a three-hour trek from base village along the dam backwater and through forest to reach this place known as 'Devkund'. A major part of the trek goes through some semi-dried forests with the river running parallel and sometimes crisscrossing through the route. A guide is required to be taken during the trek as there is dense forest around. According to the locals, the best period to visit this location is between September and mid-November.

== Commutation ==
- Distance from Pune: 110 km
- Distance from Mumbai: 170 km
- Distance from Lonavala: 52 km

=== Nearest airports ===
- Pune: international
- Mumbai: international

=== Nearest railway junctions ===
- Mangaon railway station on Konkan Railway, 30 km away
- Lonavala railway station on Central Railway, 82 km away

== Bathing ==
Devkund Waterfall is great for enjoying and taking the bath under the waterfall. The area continues to attract tourists. The tourists have now polluted this drinking water source.

== Trek details ==
- Duration: 1.5-2 hrs (to reach the waterfall from start point)
- Distance: 6.5 km approx. (one sided)
- Difficulty level: moderate (becomes life-threatening in heavy monsoons since three streams have to be crossed)
- Endurance required: medium

== Safety ==
During the monsoon the water volume increases very quickly due to the design of the hills, so it is unsafe to see the waterfall. In 2017, Devkund Waterfall was closed to tourists for three months from the July monsoon season after a couple of accidents. After the death of two trekkers at the waterfall, the local administration asked the police to impose section 144, which prohibits the assembly of more than four people in the area. In 2018, access to Devkund waterfall is prohibited by district authorities from 12 July 2018 to 12 September 2018.

From June to 30 September 2025, the Falls were closed for public due to safety reasons during the monsoon.
