= Siege of Chaul (1570–1571) =

Historical conflict in Maharashtra, India

Siege of Chaul, 1570–1571
- Part of War of the League of the Indies
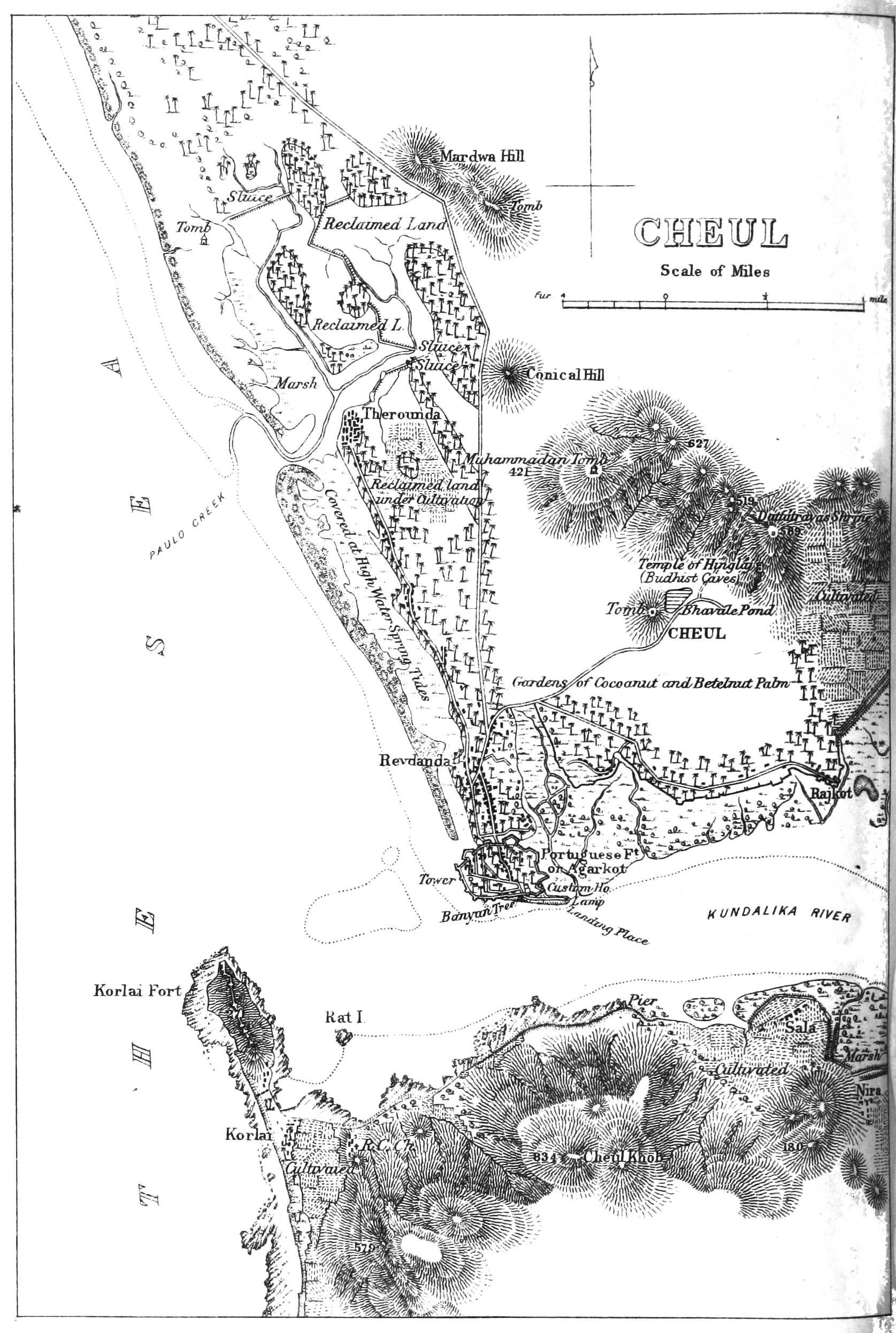
- The city and harbour of Chaul.
Date	December 15, 1570 – July 24, 1571
Location	Chaul
Result	Portuguese victory

Belligerents
Portuguese Empire	Sultanate of Ahmadnagar

Commanders and leaders
Dom Luís Freire de Andrade; Dom Francisco de Mascarenhas	Nizam Ul-Mulk Shah of Ahmadnagar

Strength
2,000 soldiers 200–300 militia	120,000 men: 38,000 cavalry; 370 war elephants; 38 heavy bombards

Casualties and losses
400+ Portuguese soldiers, unknown number of Hindu auxiliaries and civilians.	7,000+ killed, heavy material losses

The siege of Chaul was a military operation undertaken by the Ahmadnagar Sultanate against the Portuguese city of Chaul in the Maharashtra, India, between December 1570 and July 1571. Chaul was not walled at the time, but after a harsh seven-month siege the Portuguese repelled the attackers in what was one of the hardest ordeals they faced India.

Portuguese success in this siege drew the attention of 20th-century scholars owing to the tactics employed.

== Background ==
The Sultanate of Ahmadnagar was an Indian state located on the Deccan Plateau that had authorised the Portuguese governor of India Diogo Lopes de Sequeira to found a fortress and city at Chaul. Thus, the Portuguese secured at Chaul a supply of raw cotton, the manufacture of cotton fabrics and their export. The Nizam ul-Mulk of Ahmadnagar, known as Nizamaluco among the Portuguese, had maintained good relations with the Portuguese State of India and paid Portugal a tribute of 7,000 pardaus in exchange for help fighting piracy, but in the mid-16th century he joined an alliance of Islamic sultanates which, at the Battle of Talikota, inflicted a heavy defeat on the great Hindu Vijayanagara Empire, itself a major partner of the Portuguese. After the death of Rama Raya, Nizamaluco and his allies turned on the Portuguese. The Sultan of Bijapur, known as Hidalcão attacked Goa, and Nizamaluco attacked Chaul, disregarding all the trade and friendship treaties he had signed with the Portuguese until then.

Around 2,000 Portuguese lived in Chaul, trading with Mozambique, the Persian Gulf, China and Manila. In addition, hundreds of dhows anchored in Chaul every year between December and March, mainly from the Malabar Coast but also from the Middle East and Gujarat. In addition to the buildings necessary for the administration, justice and defence of the port, the city had a hospital, a Misericórdia (charity), several churches and five monasteries, belonging to the Franciscans, Dominicans, Augustinians, Jesuits and Capuchins. Its most important and influential inhabitants also had stately homes.

=== Portuguese preparations ===
Although protected by a small fort built near the shoreline in 1521, the city of Chaul was not fortified. The Portuguese were prevented by a 1558 treaty from walling the city. The garrison of Chaul numbered 50 horsemen and about 250 foot soldiers. Just as the threat of a siege became evident, the captain of the city, Dom Luís Freire de Andrade ordered the evacuation of women, children, and elderly to Goa and barricades be set up in the main streets with artillery.

Chaul is a very small and old and very weak castle and because I was certain that the enemy would take it from me when he arrived because of the very great power of people and powerful artillery that he brought, I determined to wait him in the field and with the advice of the residents of Chaul I set about building barricades of sticks and walls of stone and clay and rubble and in them I awaited the enemy...

— Luís Freire de Andrade in a letter to King Sebastian.

The residents of Chaul initially resisted the digging of trenches, the barricading of streets, the demolition of houses and the building of defence works, and wood, stones and earth had to be brought in from far away, but as the threat of a siege became evident, they began to participate more actively, but also to insisting that the captain not leave their houses out of the fortification works. In October, a fleet arrived from Goa with 600 soldiers in reinforcements, commanded by Captain-majoe Dom Francisco de Mascarenhas, who immediately ordered the opening of an extensive network of moats, trenches, earthen walls, and defensive works around the entire outer perimeter of the city, fortifying outer houses and monasteries into blockhouses or redoubts and demolishing others to clear the line of fire for the artillery. Bastions were built every 200 metres, artillery batteries were installed every 50 metres, and the last line of defence formed a triangle.

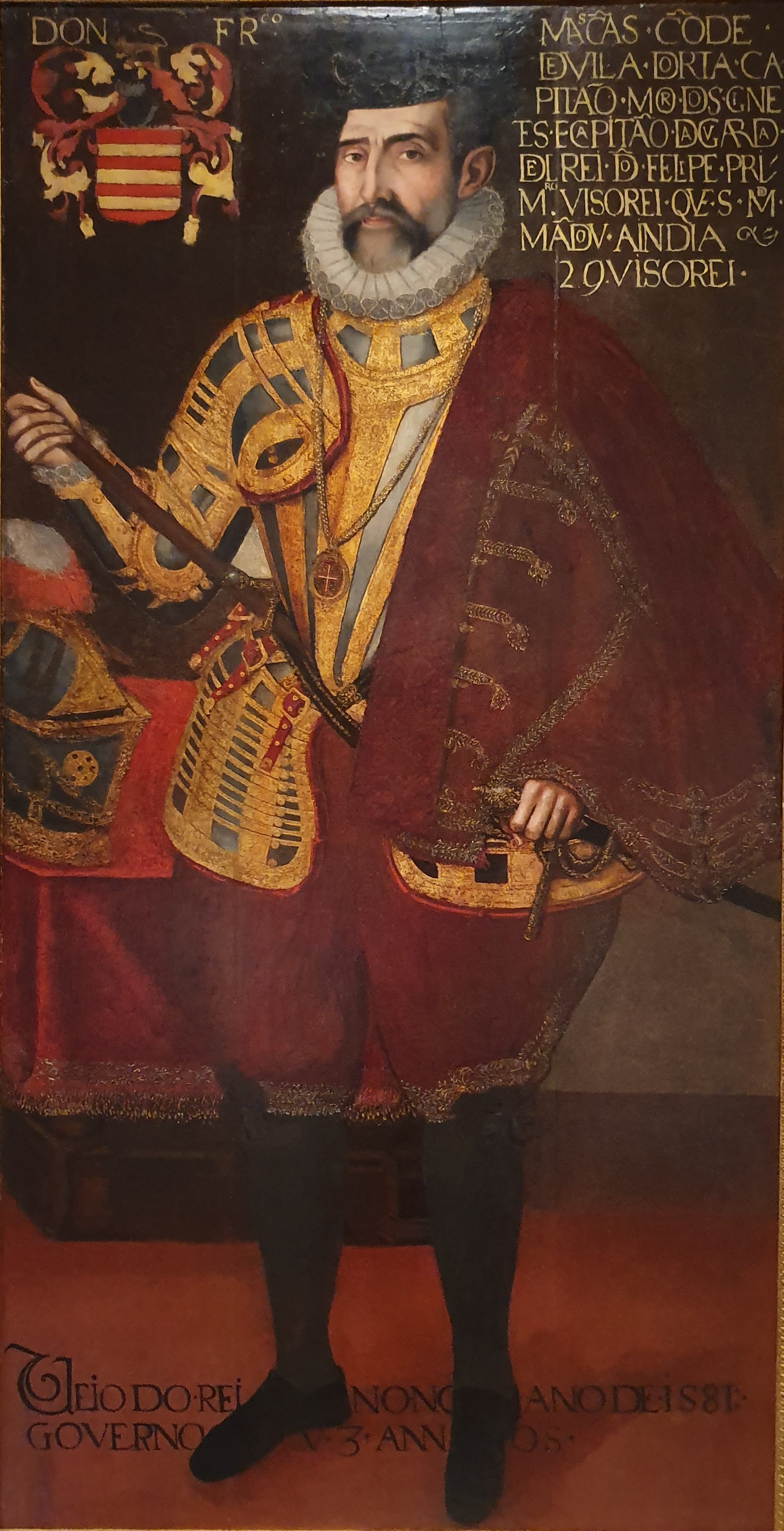
Dom Francisco de Mascarenhas as Viceroy of India.

The warships were distributed in the river to the east, so as to deny the enemy a venue of approach to the city along the river banks with their artillery. This way, it would only be possible to approach the city through a narrow, marshy section to the north, forcing the enemy to bottleneck their forces.

== Battle ==
The Ahmadnagar army also faced its own challenges in attacking Chaul. New roads had to be carved out of the Western Ghats mountain range in order to transport artillery across it. Ahmadnagar had signed peace and trade treaties with Portugal which were still standing at the time of the siege, but these were disregarded and he departed to Chaul with his forces.

On December 15, the vanguard of the army of Ahmadnagar arrived under the command of an Ethiopian general, Faratecão (formerly at the service of the Sultan of Gujarat), and clashed with the Portuguese, who repelled the attack. The Nizam arrived with the rest of his army on December 21. Through a spy, the Portuguese determined that the forces of the Nizam Ul-Mulk Shah of Ahmadnagar (Nizamaluco in Portuguese) might have risen up to 120,000 men, including many Turkic, Abyssian, Persian, Afghan, and Mughal mercenaries, 38,000 horsemen, and 370 war elephants, supported by 38 heavy bombards. Not all were fighting men; according to António Pinto Pereira:

The infantry passed one-hundred and twenty thousand, but they do not rest on them their strength, nor do they care but of the cavalry and artillery for matters of war; the footmen are brought along for the march and for service in the camp and as labourers, rather than any confidence they might have of them. In said camp came 12,000 konkanis, very good people in war, mustered by the tanadares of Konkan, which lays between the edge of the Ghats and the sea, as bomb throwers, bowmen and a few arquebusiers and 4,000 field craftsmen, blacksmiths, stonemasons and carpenters.

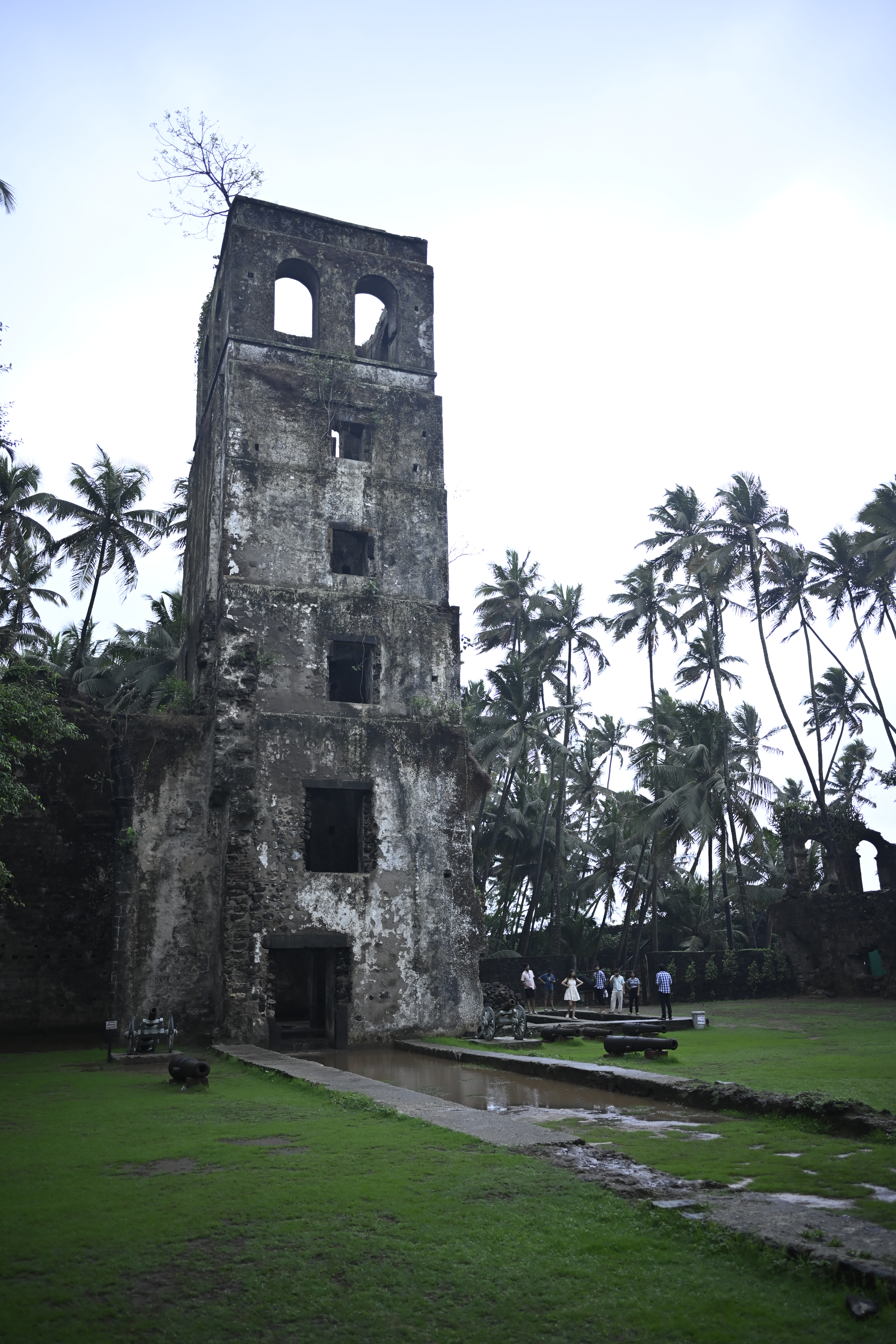
Portuguese ruins at Chaul.

The Nizams artillery out-ranged that of the Portuguese. He brought to bear 11 large cannon that fired 45 to 80, 100, 200 and even 300 pound cannonballs. The other 27 pieces were 36, 24 and 16-pounders. The Portuguese on the other hand had at best 12-pounder cannon that weighted 4000 pounds and required 20 horses to position or 8-pounders weighting 2400 pounds that required 12 horses to position, but lacking the horses the Portuguese would have to position them by hand. Other cannon were 2 and 4-pounders weighting 600 to 1800 pounds.

The great advantage of the Portuguese lied in their infantry, only 900 soldiers strong but each equipped with steel-plate armour, arquebuses and muskets capable of firing a 50 gram bullet as far as 400 meters, compared to only 300 arquebusiers on the enemy side, with less powerful and accurate weapons. The defenders on the Portuguese side numbered 1100 or 1200 men total among soldiers, auxiliaries, and civilian militia. Once the dire situation at Chaul became known however, numerous Portuguese volunteered to sail in the aid of the beleaguered city, so that soon there were as many as 2000 soldiers.

The Nizam assembled the rest of his forces around the north and northeast of the city. As his cavalry and elephants were useless in a siege, his infantry would have to bear the brunt of the assault.

On the 21st day of December he breached the fortified perimeter around the monastery of São Francisco on the outskirts of Chaul, but the heavy fire of the Portuguese arquebuses and a swift counter-attack forced them to retreat. In the meantime, the Nizam set his powerful artillery to the east of the city under the supervision of a Turkish general, Rumi Khan, near a village the Portuguese dubbed Chaul de Cima (Upper Chaul).

Meanwhile, about 2,000 horsemen proceeded to devastate the lands owned by Portuguese around Bassein and Daman, but were repelled trying to assault a small Portuguese fort at Caranjá near Bombay, defended by 40 Portuguese soldiers.

=== Bombardment begins ===
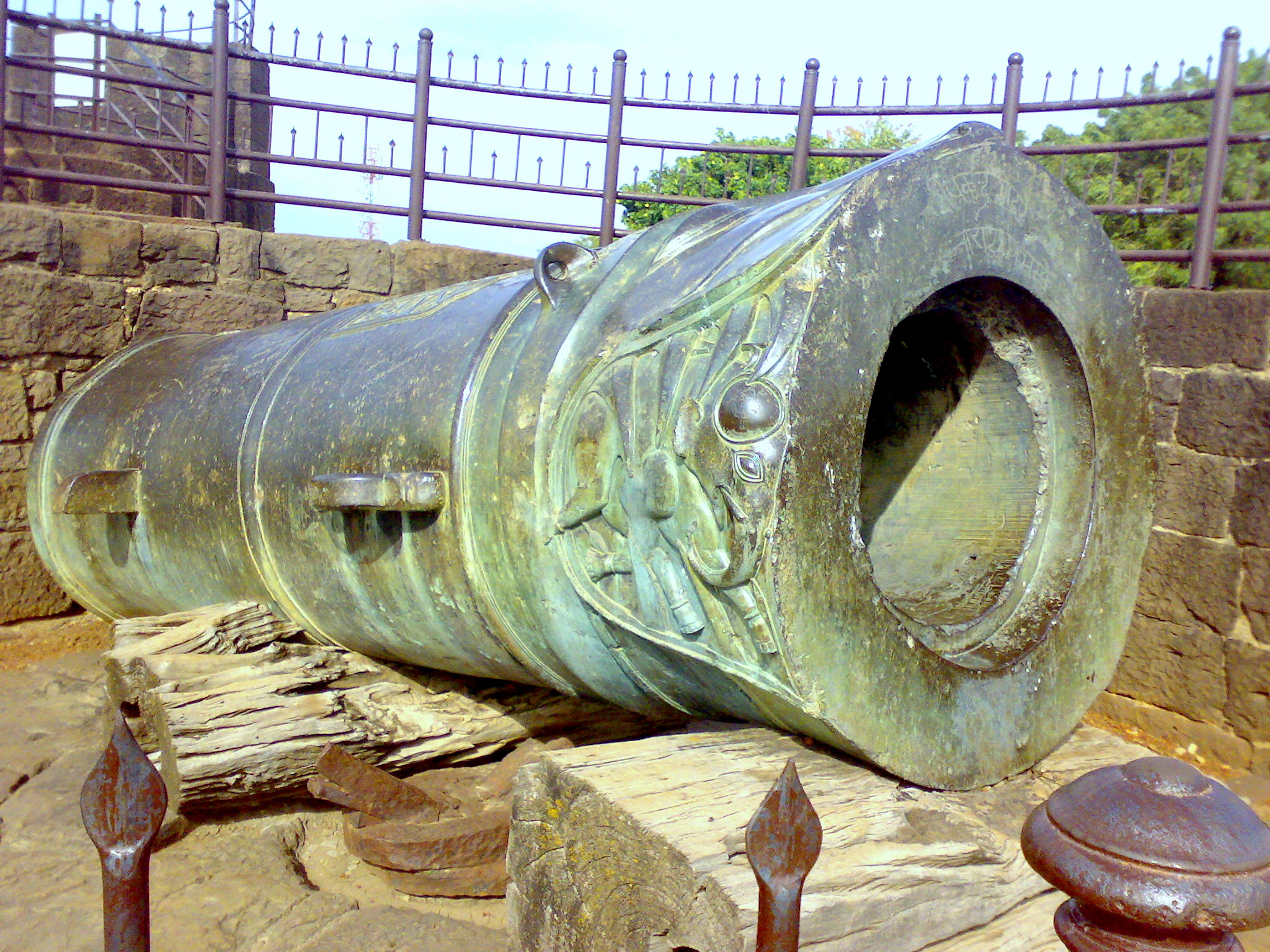
Cannon as large as the Malik-e-Maidan were recorded by the Portuguese as being in use by the forces of the Nizam.

On January 10, the batteries of the Nizam began bombarding the outer blockhouses of Chaul, reducing them to rubble after a few days. One such piece earned from the Portuguese the nickname "Orlando Furioso". Buried under the stones and beams of houses turned to redoubts and fortlets but which collapsed under the weight of the bombardment, the Portuguese would at the same time carry out sallies and coups-de-main against enemy lines. They suffered considerable casualties due to the enemy bombardment, while the besiegers lost many men due to the constant skirmishes with the Portuguese, who usually held the upper-hand in hand-to-hand combat.

Fighting around Chaul broke down to trench warfare, as the army of Ahmadnagar dug trenches towards Portuguese lines to cover from their gunfire, amidst frequent Portuguese raids, only tens of meters apart from each other. The Portuguese dug counter-mines to neutralize them. Day after day the fighting became more brutal as the Portuguese gradually abandoned their outer blockhouses and defenses, pressured by the enemys numerical superiority.

At this point, a Portuguese captain Agostinho Nunes introduced for the first time an innovation that the Portuguese historian António Pinto Pereira considered to have been critical in withstanding the enemy bombardment: he ordered his soldiers to dig a special trench with a firing parapet, protected by sloped earth—a "fire trench". This invention was later mis-attributed to the Dutch.

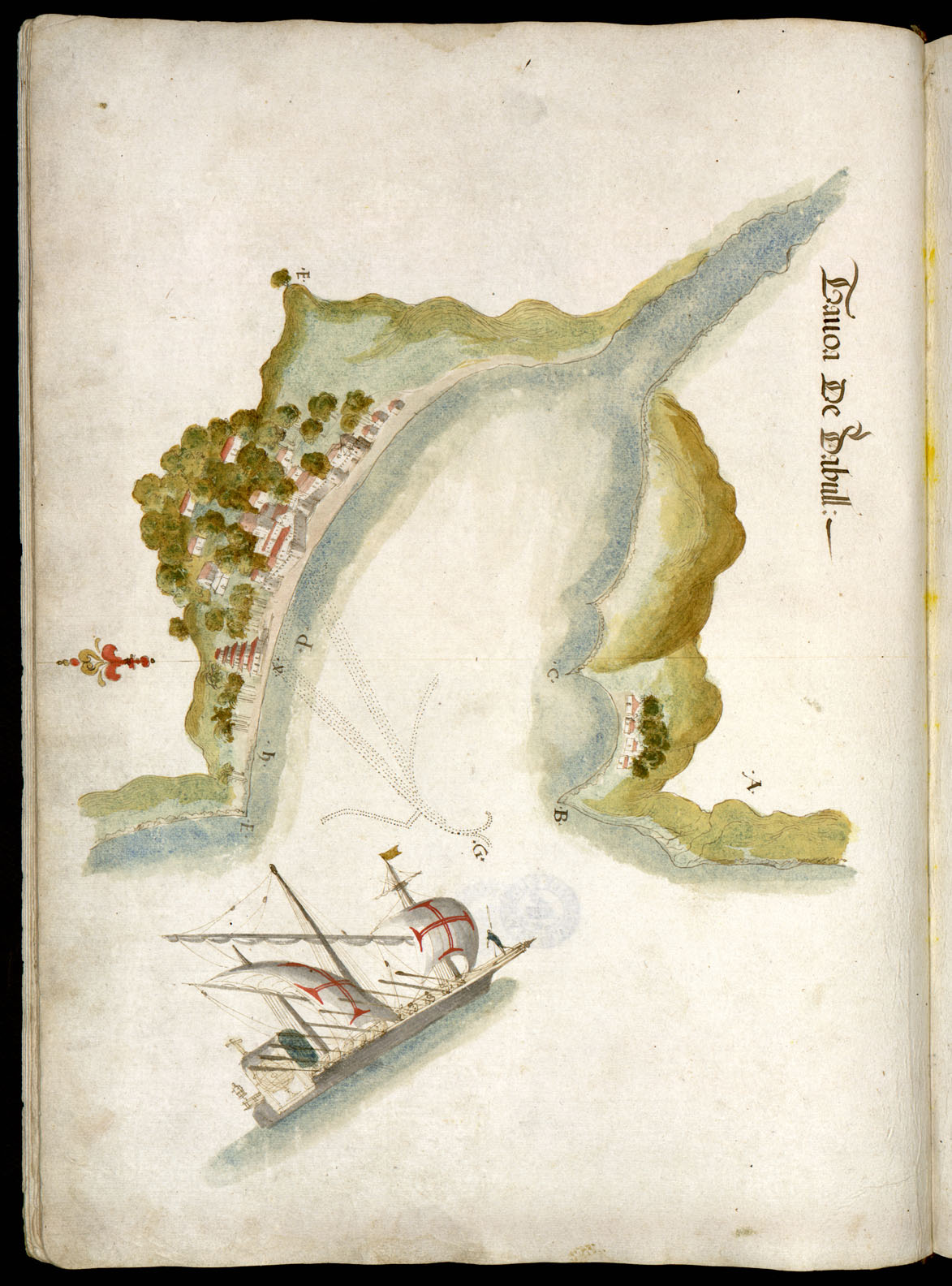
Portuguese galley in India, featured in a 16th-century watercolour.

On Friday January 19 the Muslim zigzag trenches reached the monastery of São Francisco. An assault took place the following day, but the Portuguese repelled it. A three-day bombardment following during which the Portuguese prepared their retreat along a coastal wall leading back to the monastery of São Domingos, taking their guns with them and set fire to the stronghold. In the last week of January the enemy was able to position their guns on São Francisco and begin bombarding Portuguese positions as far as São Domingos.

In February, a small fleet of 5 half-galleys and 25 smaller craft with 2,000 men from Calicut, commanded by Catiproca Marcá, arrived in Chaul to meet up with the forces of the Nizam, under cover from the night. The Portuguese had five galleys and eleven foists in the harbour, but the Malabarese avoided clashing with the Portuguese galleys.

In late February the Nizam ordered a general assault on the city, but was repelled with heavy losses, just as the Portuguese received important reinforcements by sea from Goa and Bassein. The Nizam observed all the actions of his army closely, and the Portuguese could see him reprimanding his men for their cowardlyness and threatening them with a whip. Fighting continued over the possession of the outer strongholds throughout the months of March and April, as the army of the Nizam suffered heavy casualties. Following a sortie of the Portuguese on April 11, the Nizam ordered the city to be subjected to a general bombardment, which demolished several strongholds and sunk the Viceroy's galley anchored in the harbour.

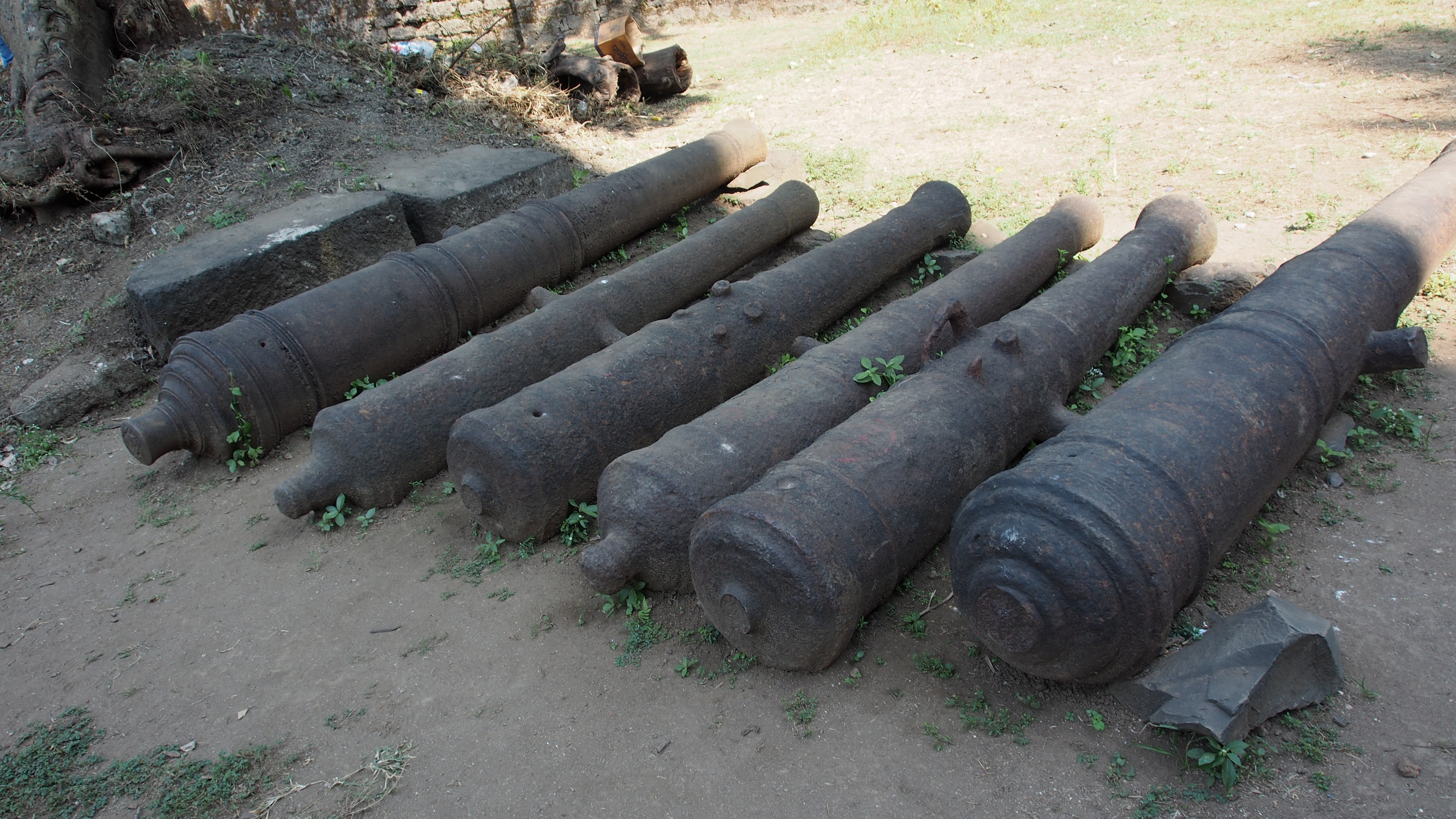
Portuguese artillery at Chaul.

The Indian monsoon had set in by then, and its torrential rain and storms prevented the arrival of reinforcements by sea. Over 200 Portuguese deserted by Chaul still received a reinforcement of 300 men, who had braved the stormy Indian Ocean sea. The house of a Portuguese resident named Nuno Álvares Pereira was attacked by 500 warriors of the Nizam but it was defended for 40 days by 42 Portuguese. The house of Nuno Velho was besieged for thirty days. The troops of the Sultan captured the São Domingos Monastery and tried to occupy the houses in the street that led to the Misericórdia by they suffered almost 900 casualties and the Portuguese recovered control of the monastery.

By then none of the Portuguese guns could fire any longer, and the Muslims proceeded to plant their second parallel and drive the second zigzags into the Portuguese outworks, which were mined at the same time. Notwithstanding a valorous resistance, the disparity in numbers was still immense, and despite frequent sorties, little by little, the Portuguese were forced to give ground to the great mass of enemies, until by 22 May they were finally cornered in their last line of defence. A few days afterwards, the men of the Sultan set up new batteries over the ruins of São Domingos.

=== Defense of the last line ===
Portuguese naval and battle standard bearing the Cross of the Order of Christ.

Reduced to a triangle that formed their last line of defense, the Portuguese desperately defended their lines against several waves of attackers for the following thirty days, unleashing volleys of matchlock fire and hurling gunpowder grenades at day and night. R. O. W. Goertz commented that "it defies comprehension how the Portuguese endured the next thirty days. Rebuilding their redoubts after each impact as best they could, they endeavoured to keep their fuses lit in the driving monsoon rain, and with unfaltering discipline stepped into the line to throw firepots and to dischard and reload their matchlocks, repelling wave after wave of attackers for days and nights on end. Four hundred Portuguese had by now died, not counting their Hindu allies and the civilians; many hundreds more had been wounded."

The forces of the Nizam however, failed to overcome the Portuguese in time. They had successfully held out through the monsoon season, and now that it had passed the weather finally allowed vessels to flow freely into the city, bearing fresh reinforcements nearly every day. When the Nizam ordered a general assault on the city on June 29 at 2 o'clock in the afternoon, his forces broke into the town at the sound of war-cries and military instruments, but the Portuguese shattered the assault and in a counter-attack pushed the enemies through a deadly maze of zigzagging trenches back to their camp and beyond in a complete rout, capturing all the cannon, most of the small arms, weapons, and destroying the saps and siegeworks along the way, having slain over 3,000 of the besiegers at the end of six hours fighting.

After this setback, on July 24 Murtaza Nizam Shah requested peace, and withdrew his army.

== Aftermath ==
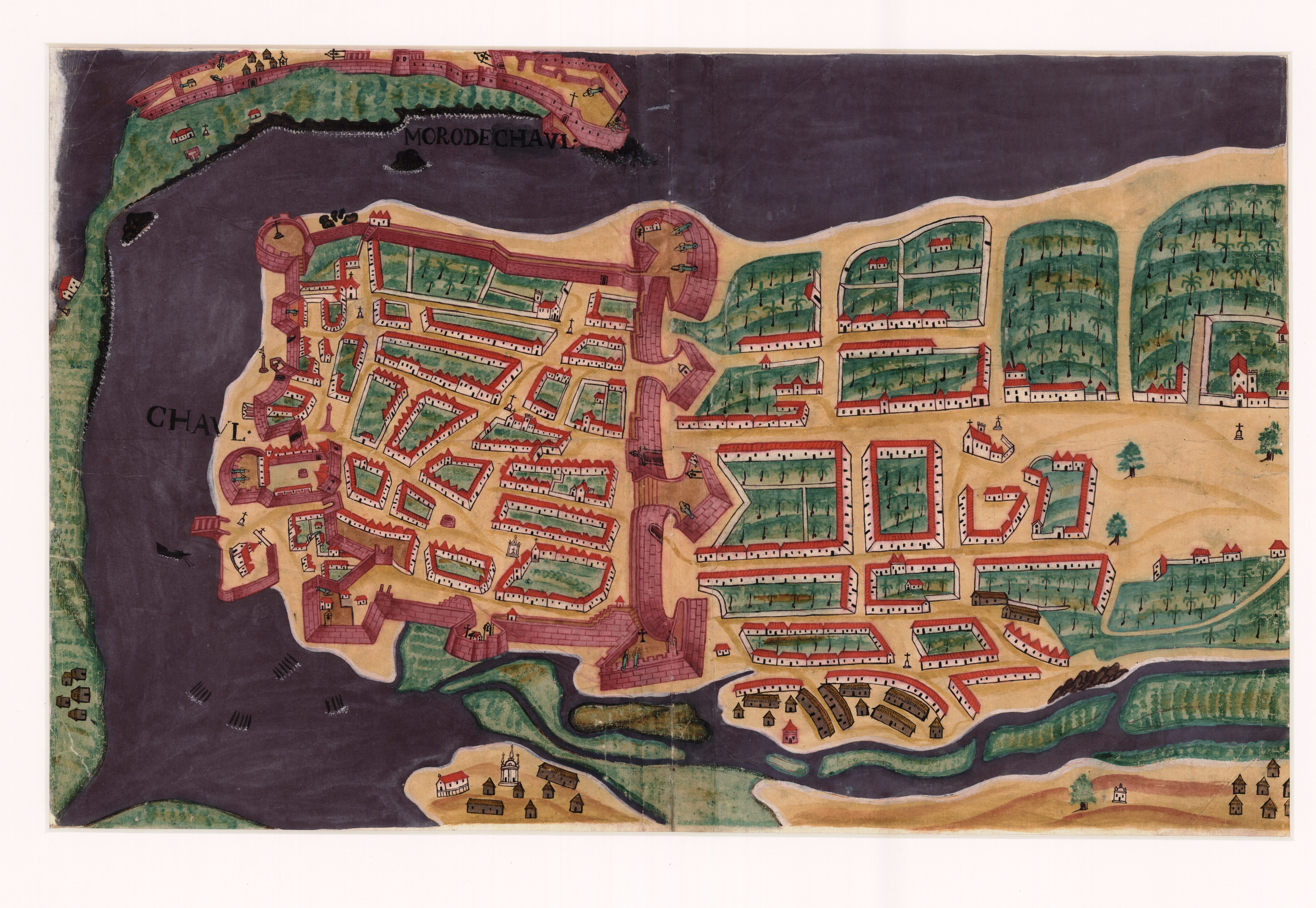
City of Chaul, 1635

A commission with two people from each side was formed to evaluate the damage and the Sultan promised to compensate the Portuguese. Nevertheless, and evidently not wishing to place too much trust on the Sultans word again, after the siege Portuguese authorities annexed some of the land around the city to reward the soldiers with, under the justification of "Just War", since the Sultan had broken a peace treaty and attacked without provokation or declaration. The city was also later walled.

Outstanding organization in the supply of Chaul and excellent cooperation between army and navy was one of the factors that allowed Chaul to resist. In spite of the circumstances, Portuguese morale, discipline and confidence remained high throughout the siege. "Long-time military drill and training as professional soldiers had instilled in them iron discipline, endurance and self-control essential in facing forces one hundred times their number." The Portuguese fought on with "an esprit de corps and comradeship of total dependability". Captain-major Dom Francisco de Mascarenhas also possessed the qualities of a good leader as he reacted quickly, remained calm in the face of great danger, and possessed the knowledge, experience, and determination that inspired confidence in his men, with whom he shared all dangers and labours. He was later promoted to the position of Viceroy of India.

The fire-trench invented by the Portuguese at Chaul proved that an open city could sustain an artillery siege.

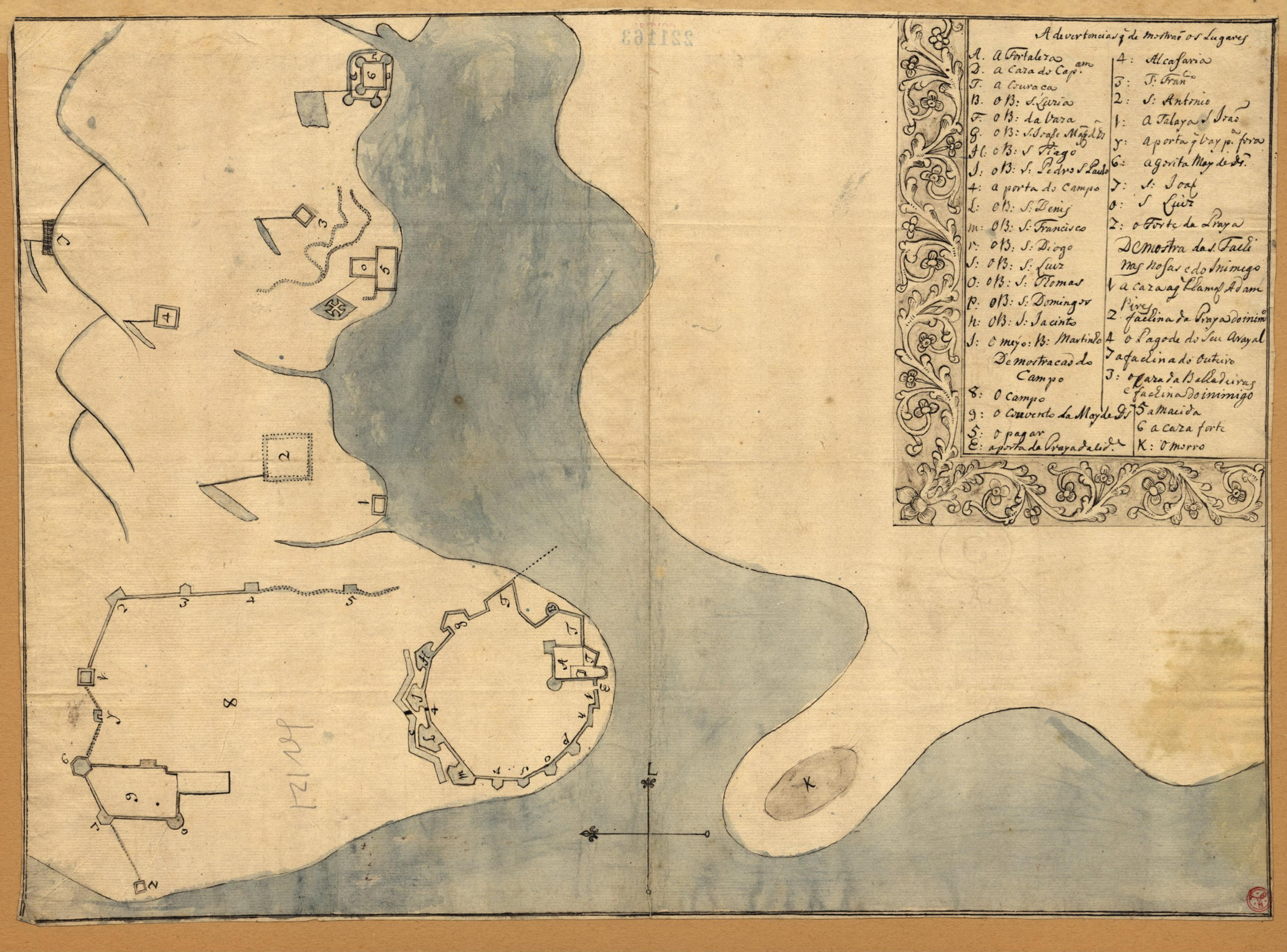
Plant of Chaul.

The ability to organize the flow of hundreds of tons of iron and supplies to feed such a large army across the Western Ghats stands as a testament to the expertise of the logistics officers of Murtaza Nizam ul-Mulk Shah. He was not helped however by the fact that the strength of his army lay in his cavalry and elephants, not the infantry, and that he received no help at all from his Rajput chiefs, while the Zamorins naval blockade was half-hearted. "Against all odds, the lesson learned from European sieges, that no man can build a defense that other men cannot overcome, was proven wrong time after time, from the very beginning of Portuguese involvement in India".

The successful defence of an unwalled city was a novelty at the time, and in a letter to King Sebastian, Luís Freire de Andrade reflected:

The biggest thing that has happened in the world is the defense of an unwalled city with only the chests of the noblemen, soldiers, and married men of Chaul...

— Luís Freire de Andrade.

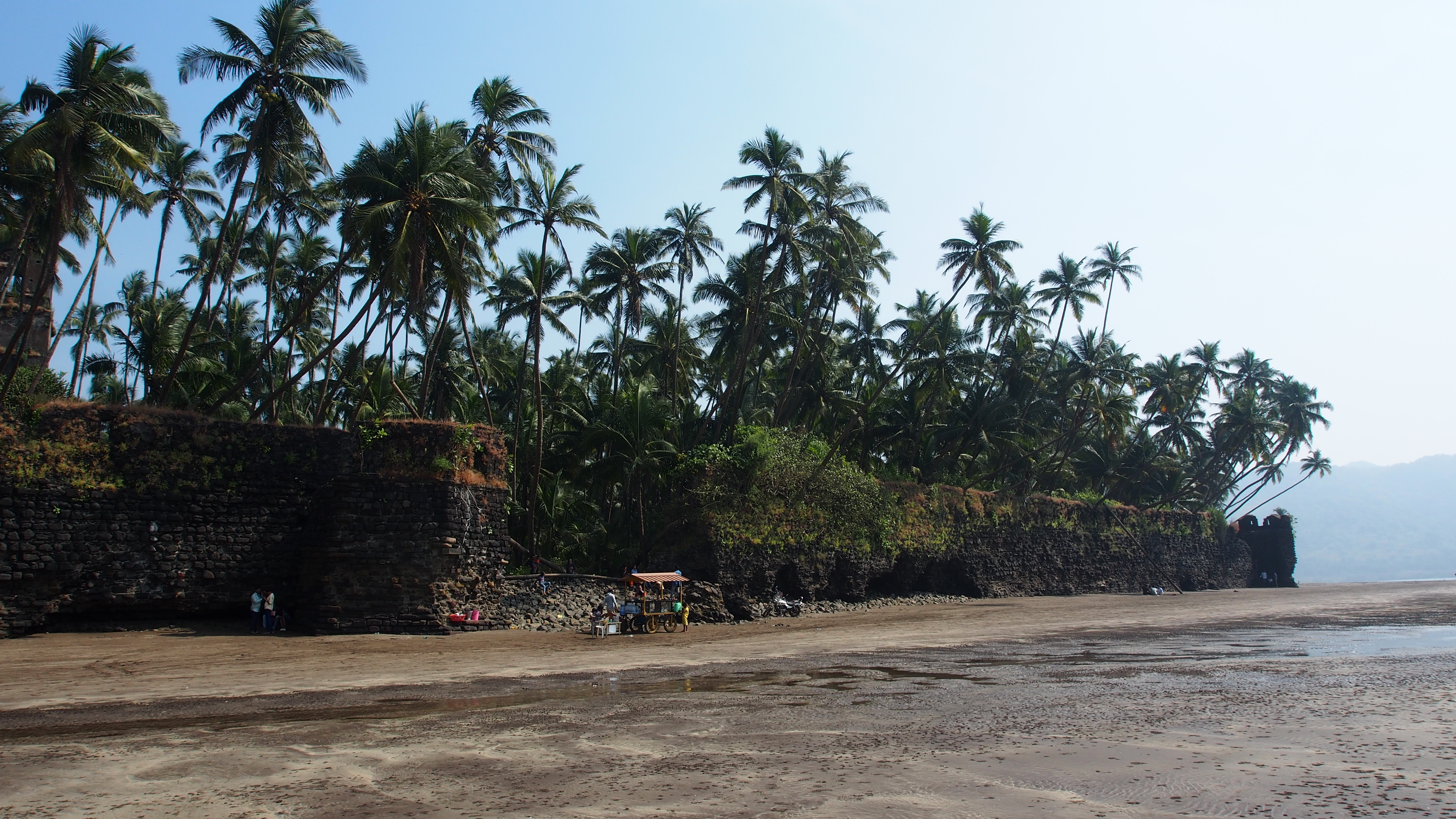
Ruins of the Portuguese fortress of Chaul.

== See also ==
- Battle of Chaul (1508)
- Siege of Chaul (1594)
- Maratha–Portuguese War (1683–1684)
