= Siege of Chaul (1594) =

Siege of the city in Maharashtra, India

- Part of Adil Shahi–Portuguese conflicts
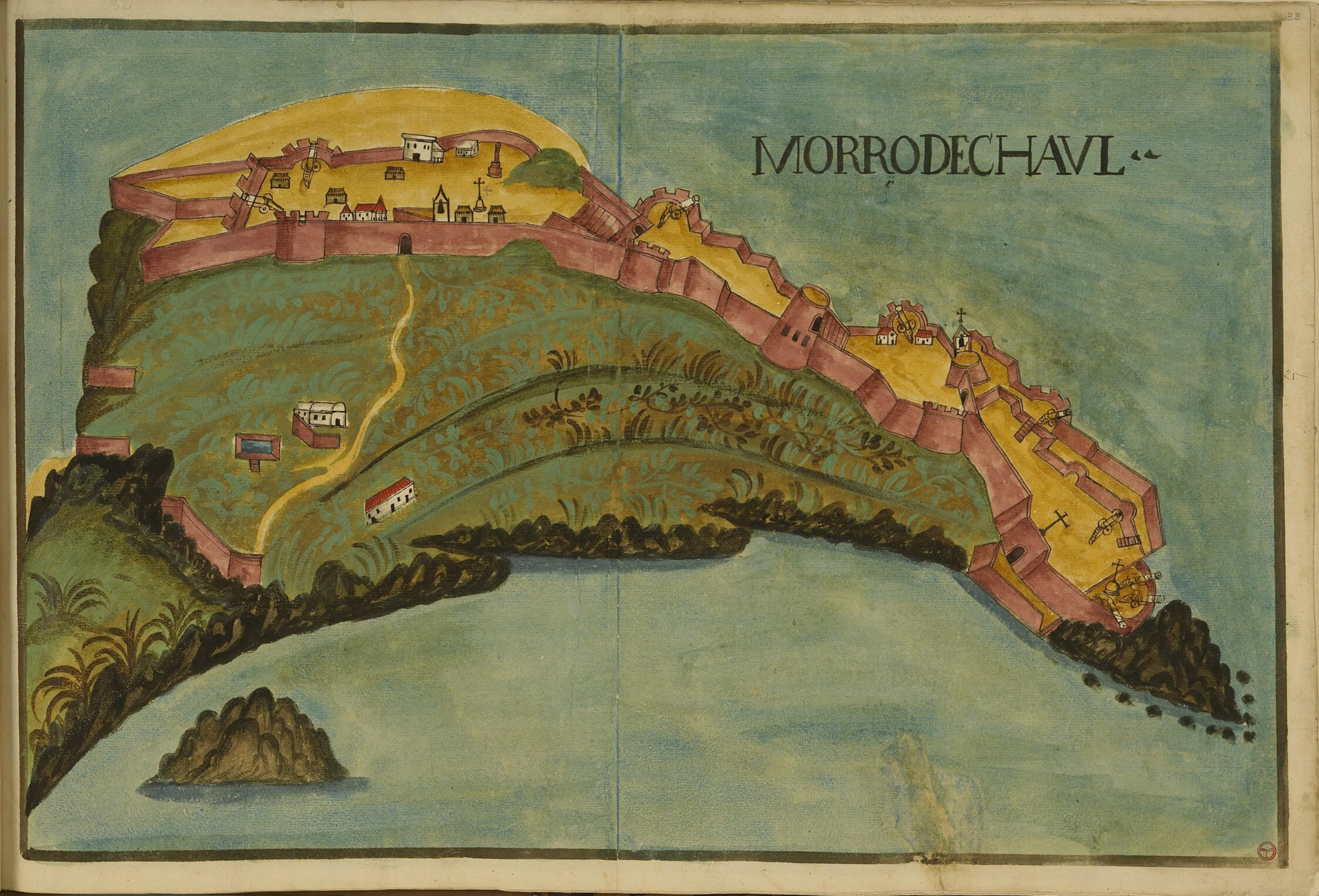
- Portuguese Map of Korlai Fort (Morro de Chaul)
Date	Siege: Unknown; Battle: 4 September 1594
Location	Korlai Fort, Chaul, modern-day India 18°32′9″N 72°54′29″E
Result	Portuguese victory

Belligerents
Portugal	Ahmadnagar Sultanate

Commanders and leaders
(Portugal) Álvaro de Abranches	Thanadar (WIA); Farhad Khan (POW)

Strength
3,000	8,000

Casualties and losses
21 dead 50 wounded	10,000–12,000 killed

The siege of Chaul was a military siege in 1594 undertaken by the Ahmadnagar Sultanate against the Portuguese city of Chaul. The siege was followed by a battle that took place at the Morro de Chaul Fort, which ended in a Portuguese victory.

== Background ==
=== Portuguese Chaul ===
Chaul came under Portuguese control in 1521, the same year they constructed their first fort. In October 1531, they built a substantial square stone fortress named Santa Maria do Castelo. This fortress housed a church and accommodations for 120 men. The Portuguese town of Chaul grew around this fortress. However, under the terms of a treaty in 1558, the town's fortifications were no longer maintained.

In November 1570, Nizam Shah launched an attack on Chaul, leading a months-long siege. The town endured significant hardship until the siege was lifted in July 1571 with the signing of a treaty. Following the siege, the town was rebuilt, and fortifications, including town walls and several bastions, were constructed.

In April 1592, Chaul faced another siege by the Moors. Despite intense fighting, the Portuguese successfully repelled the assault.

=== Korlai Fort ===
Diogo do Couto describes the imposing fortress near Chaul as follows: "Opposite our city of Chaul, and extending across the mouth of the river, stands a steep and towering hill known as the Rock (Morro). This hill had been transformed by the forces of Melique, the Ahmadnagar king, into one of the world's strongest fortresses. The Rock was surrounded on three sides by the sea, while the fourth side featured a defensive ditch stretching from the sea to the river, crossed by a wooden drawbridge. Behind the ditch stood a tall and sturdy wall, reinforced by two massive bastions. Between these bastions, perched on the wall, was a bronze lion bearing the inscription: 'None passes me but fights.' Further up the Rock, another defensive wall with bastions divided the fortress. At its highest point rose a formidable tower known as the 'Tower of Resistance,' crowned by a bronze eagle with wings outspread and the inscription: 'None passes me but flies.' At the river-facing tip of the Rock stood another large bastion, adding to the seven bastions in total, all equipped with over 70 pieces of heavy artillery.

Within the walls, the Moors had constructed a deep cistern made of finely cut stone, several well-stocked armories, and a number of well-built houses. The garrison comprised around 8,000 troops, both cavalry and infantry, including many wealthy and noble Moors. Outside the walls, these nobles lived in colorful, opulent tents, forming a camp that included a bustling bazaar of nearly 7,000 people. The bazaar supplied everything needed for such a large population and boasted rich textiles, money, and merchandise.

Although an alliance existed between Ahmadnagar and the Portuguese, the Moors began to harass the Portuguese by occasionally firing on their fort from the commanding position of the Rock. The Portuguese faced several encounters with them, and although success was not always on their side, they managed to achieve some victories. One notable occasion was when a group of Mughals, expecting to witness the inevitable defeat of the Portuguese, arrived to observe the battle.

== Siege ==
Hostilities were sanctioned by Burhân Nizam Shah, despite the peace established during Francisco Barreto’s governorship. These actions were supposedly justified by the conduct of Mathias d'Albuquerque, the viceroy of India (r. 1591 – 1597), but this served as little more than a pretext. Alongside the troops dispatched to besiege Chaul, several military parties under Nizam Shah’s command ravaged the districts surrounding the Portuguese forts at Bassein and Chaul, leaving destruction in their wake. As the Moors believed the capture of Chaul was imminent, given the damage their cannons had inflicted on its walls, fourteen Mughal chiefs were present to witness the siege. However, during a sortie by the Portuguese, nine of these chiefs were killed, and two were captured, with the rest fleeing in disgrace. The eunuch Thanadar, the commander of the besieging forces, was mortally wounded and soon died, as did his Turkish commander fighting by his side. Farhad Khân then took over the siege, relentlessly attacking the Portuguese day and night with powerful artillery.

== Battle of Morro de Chaul ==
The Portuguese garrison in Chaul numbered 1,000 men, reinforced by 300 troops from Bassein and 200 from Salsette, led by Alvaro de Abranches. With a total of 1,500 Portuguese soldiers and an equal number of native mercenaries—brave and loyal, who “often voluntarily interposed their own bodies to protect their masters,” as Faria e Souza noted—Abranches set a date to counterattack. On 2 September, after attending mass and receiving confession, the Portuguese troops embarked in small vessels, crossed the river, and advanced to the Môrro, where the battle resumed, with Abranches leading the vanguard and Dom Cosme de Lafeitar commanding the rear. The Moors released ten elephants, hoping they would cause chaos among the Portuguese ranks. However, one elephant, severely wounded by a Portuguese soldier, turned back and trampled its own forces, falling into a ditch and creating a bridge-like path. Another elephant charged through a narrow gate in the enemy's fortifications, allowing the Portuguese to enter, and the Moors were slaughtered almost without resistance until the “Tower of Resistance,” where they made their last stand. While some accounts claim 10,000, others claim 60,000 casualties; but this is an exaggeration. A particular Muslim historian acknowledges a loss of 12,000 men.

== Aftermath ==
Farhad Khân, along with his wife and daughter, was captured, and only 21 Portuguese soldiers were killed and 50 were wounded. The spoils included 75 large cannons, vast quantities of ammunition, many horses, and five elephants. Farhad Khân converted to Christianity before his death, as did his daughter, who was sent to Portugal, while his wife was ransomed.

Due to the persistent Moorish attacks on Chaul, additional defensive structures were constructed in 1613. However, Portuguese power gradually declined, and Chaul's importance waned.

In March 1739, Chaul and its fortress, Morro de Chaul, were besieged by the Angria forces. After several months, the siege was lifted in October. Finally, on 18 September 1740, Chaul was ceded to the Marathas through a treaty.

== See also ==
- Battle of Chaul (1508)
- Siege of Chaul (1570–1571)
- Maratha–Portuguese War (1683–1684)

== Bibliography ==
- Da Cunha, J. G. (1876). Notes on the History and Antiquities of Chaul and Bassein. India: Thacker, Vining.
