= Chaul =

- village
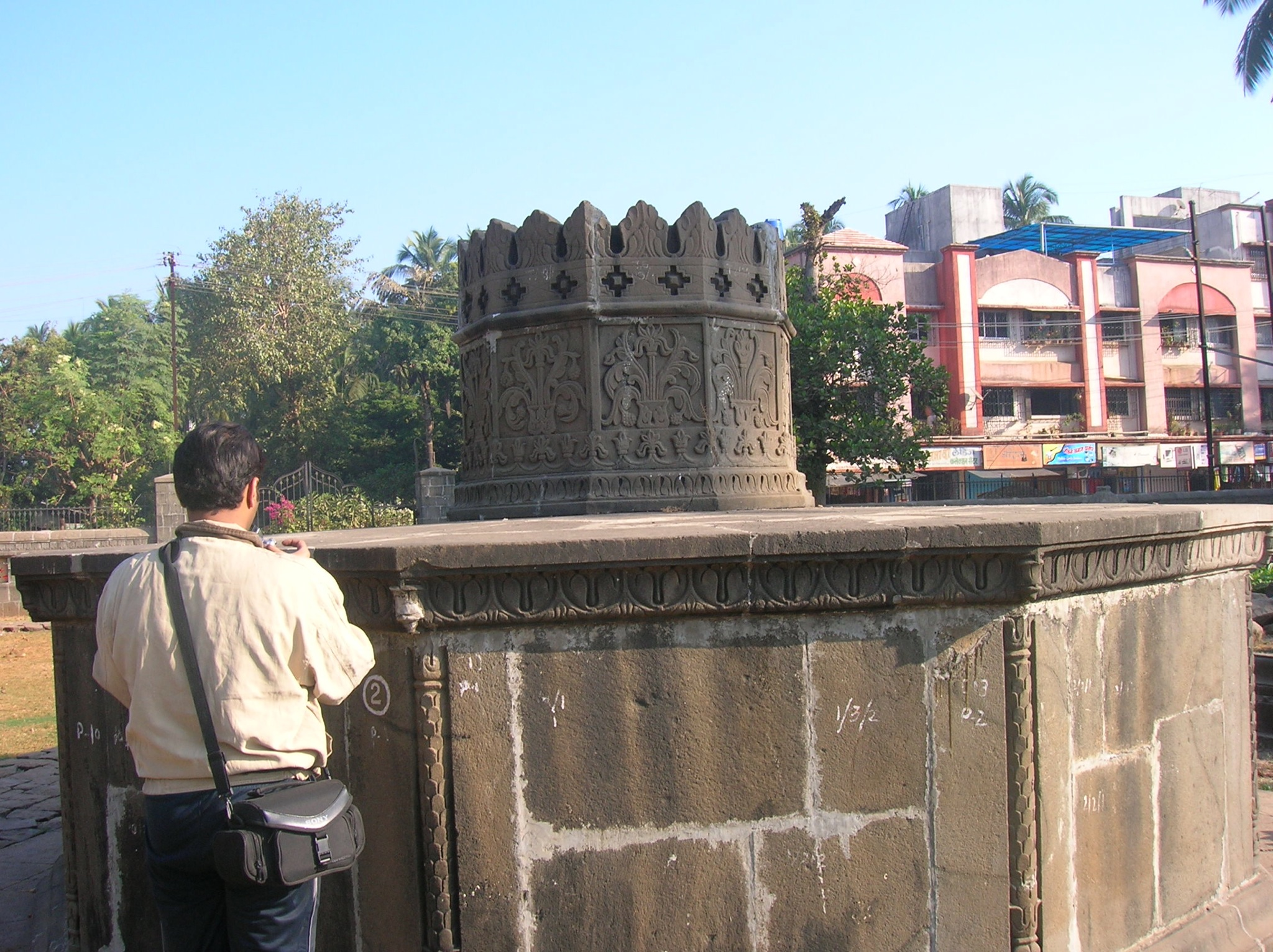
- The samadhi (mausoleum) of Maratha Koli Admiral Kanhoji Angre at Alibag
- Nickname: Shivsena Nagari
- Location in Maharashtra, India
- Coordinates: 18.5461°N 72.9272°E
- Country: India
- State: Maharashtra

Government
  - Type: Grampanchayat

Languages
  - Official: Marathi
- Time zone: UTC+5:30 (IST)

Chaul is a village in the Alibag taluka of the Raigad district in Maharashtra, India. It was a town of Portuguese India, with the Korlai Fort located nearby.

== History ==
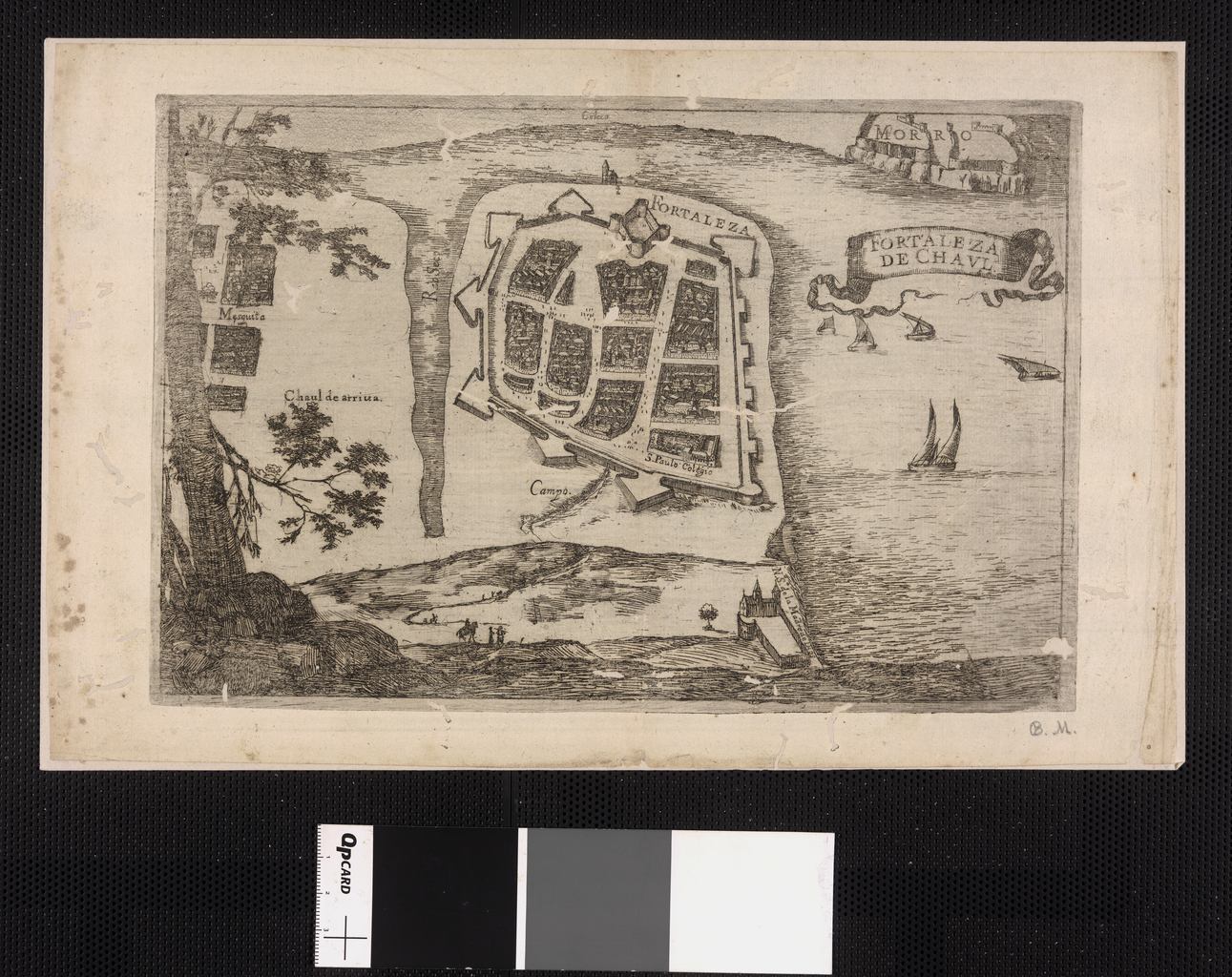
Fortress of Chaul

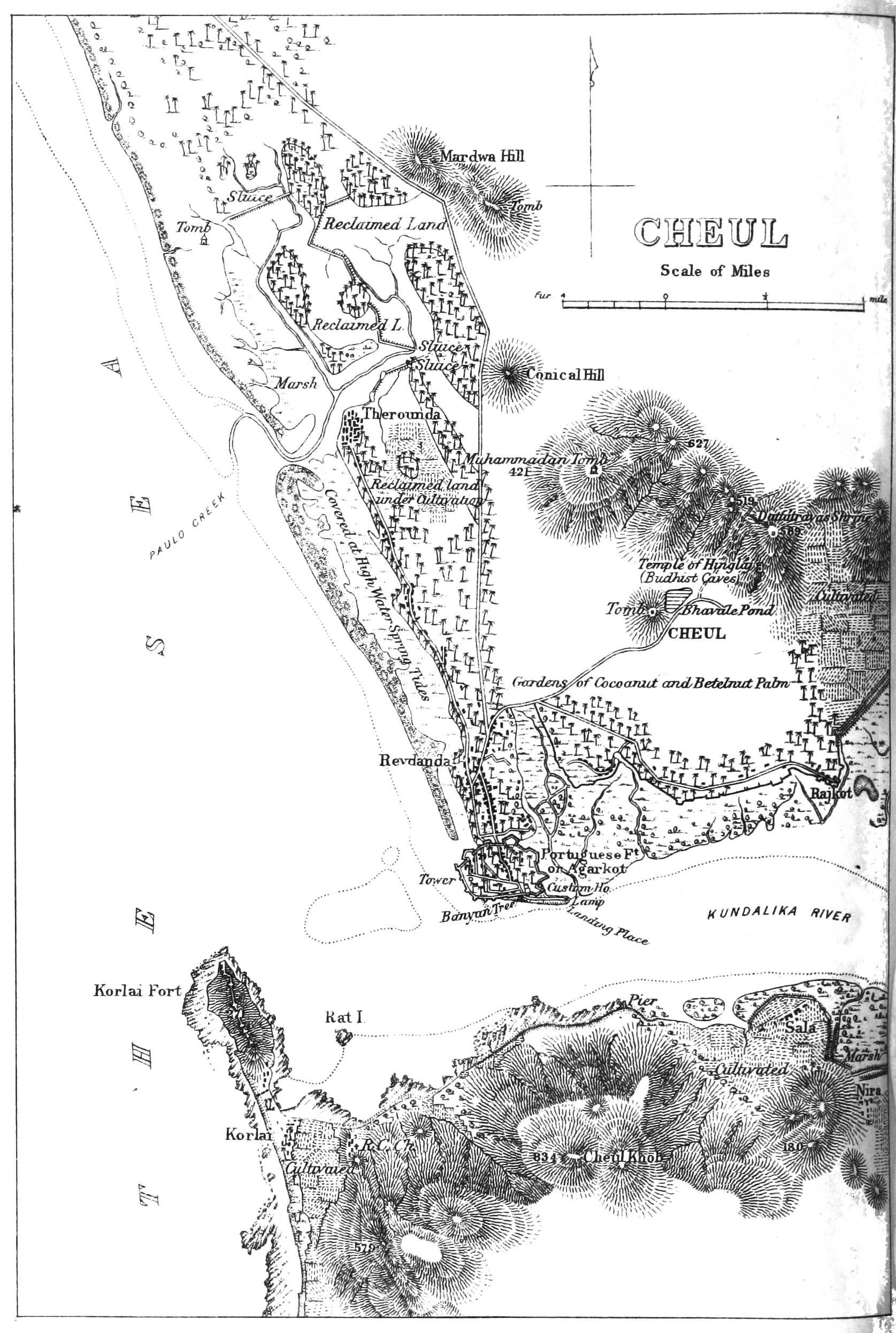
Old Map of Chaul

The town was famous for cotton manufactured goods in the 15th and 16th century, According to Varthema, Chaul was producing a lot of cotton stuffs. Even Portuguese explorer and writer Duarte Barbosa conceded fame of the Chaul for cotton materials.

== See also ==
- Battle of Diu
- Revdanda
- Battle of Chaul
- Siege of Chaul (1570–1571)
- Siege of Chaul (1594)
- Maratha–Portuguese War (1683–1684)
