= Jaigad Port =

Sea port in Maharashtra, India

JSW Jaigad Port
- Interactive map of JSW Jaigad Port
- Location within Maharashtra

Location
- Country: India
- Location: Jaigad, Ratnagiri, Maharashtra
- Coordinates: 17.3037609°N 73.2063366°E

Details
- Opened: 2009; 17 years ago
- Operated by: JSW Jaigarh Port Limited
- Owned by: JSW Infrastructure
- Type of Harbor: Deep-sea port
- No. of berths: 7
- Main trades: Steam Coal and Sugar

Statistics
- Annual cargo tonnage: 50 million tonnes (2021)
- Draft: 18.5 metres (61 ft)

Jaigad Port also officially known as JSW Jaigarh Port is a sea port in Jaigad, Maharashtra, on the eastern coast of the Arabian Sea. The port is operated by JSW Infrastructure. It is Maharashtra's first deep water and all-weather port for berthing of capesized ships. The port offers specialised services for dry bulk and liquid cargo. As of 2021, the port has a cargo handling capacity of 50 million metric tons (55 million short tons).

== Background ==
JSW Energy started construction of a 1200 MW thermal power plant (known as the Ratnagiri Power Plant) at Jaigad in the Ratnagiri district, Maharashtra, in the early 2000s. The thermal power plant was commissioned in 2007. The Jaigad port (JSW) was established in 2006 to support the coal import requirements directly adjacent to the thermal power plant. The port was officially inaugurated in August 2009. All of the coal for JSW Energy thermal power plant is supplied by Jaigad Port.

== Operations ==
Jaigad Port has a handling capacity of 50 million metric tons (55 million short tons) per year and 7 berths, of which all berths are operational. The total quay length is 1.91 kilometres (18.54 mi), and the depths 18.5 meters. These characteristics are comparable with those offered by the most important international ports, allowing the accommodation of tankers with a capacity of 3,40,000 tonnes deadweight (DWT) and bulkcarriers of 2,00,000 DWT.

== Statistics ==
In the fiscal year 2019, Jaigad Port handled 20.96 million metric tons (23.10 million short tons) of cargo. This is significantly higher than 15.04 million metric tons (16.58 million short tons) of cargo it handled in 2018.

== See also ==
- Jaigad Village
- Jaigad Fort
- Sangameshwar
- Ports in India
