= Jaigad =

Village in Maharashtra, India

- Village
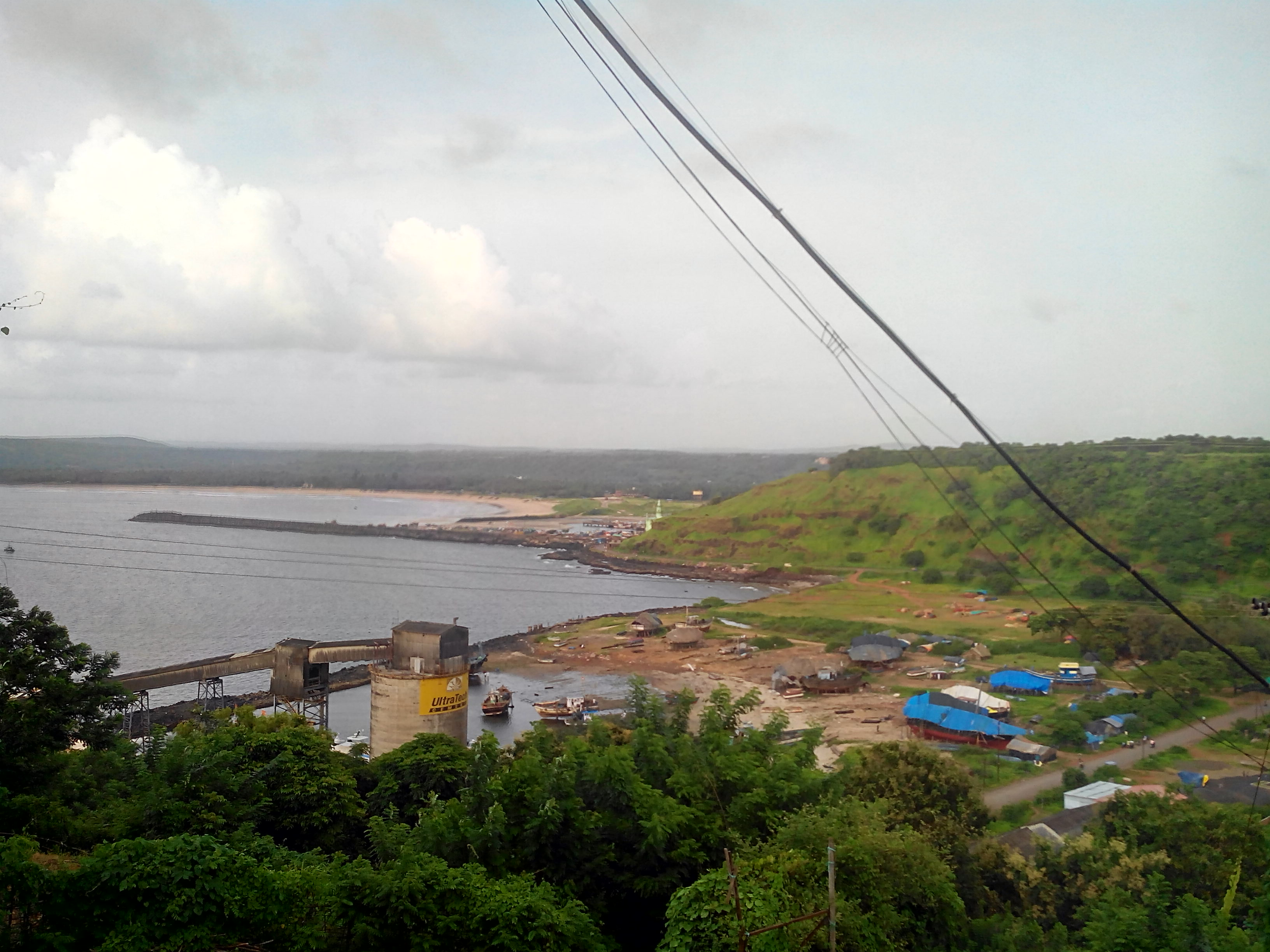

- Location in Maharashtra, India
- Coordinates: 17°17′40″N 73°13′12″E
- Country: India
- State: Maharashtra
- District: Ratnagiri

Languages
  - Official: Marathi
- Time zone: UTC+5:30 (IST)

Jaigad (Marathi: जयगड) is a coastal village situated at the mouth of the Shástri river in Ratnagiri district of Maharashtra. Jaigad village is renowned for its prominent attraction, Jaigad Fort, a significant sea fort in Maharashtra. The village's administration is overseen by a sarpanch, an elected representative chosen through local elections.

== Occupation ==
The total geographical area of the village is 374 hectares within the coastal region. The main occupation for the peoples living in Jaigad is fishing and most of the population are engaged in fishing related activities. Some of the occupants here are educated highly enough to work in other parts of the state.

== Thermal Energy Plant ==
JSW Energy Plant of Konkan Region i.e. Ratnagiri plant is located in Jaigad village. Inaugurated in July 2007, the thermal plant achieved remarkable efficiency by rapidly commissioning its first unit in 2010, followed by the full commissioning of the entire plant in 2011.

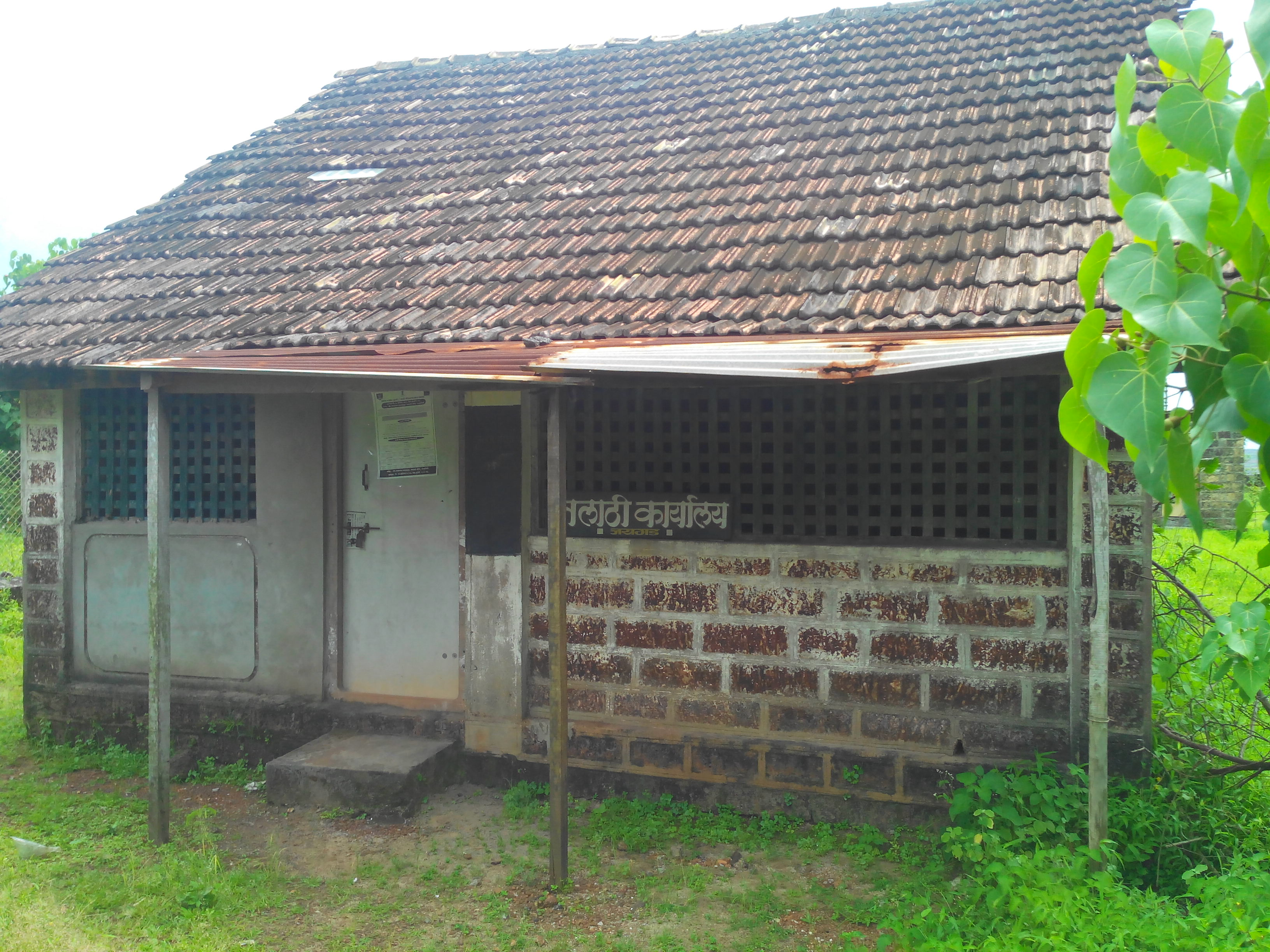
Villager's house in Jaigad

== Tourism ==
Situated at the convergence of Jaigad creek and the Arabian Sea, two forts were constructed to safeguard the creek trade route: Vijaygad fort on the northern side, now remaining as a bastion, and Jaigad fort on the southern side, which remains well-preserved. These forts can be visited in a single day from Ratnagiri and Guhagar. Other notable points are Jaigad beach, Jaigad lighthouse, Karhateshwar Temple, Kunbiwadi beach, Nadivade beach, Tavsal beach.

== Nearby Villages of Jaigad ==
- Sakhar Mohalla
- Kunbiwadi
- Nandivade
- Sandelavagan
- Sandkhol
- Kachare

== Climate ==
After March, the temperature starts rising but rarely crosses 30°C. May emerges as the hottest month, with temperatures soaring up to 40°C. Monsoon spans from June to October, featuring abundant and consistent rainfall during this period.

== Transport ==
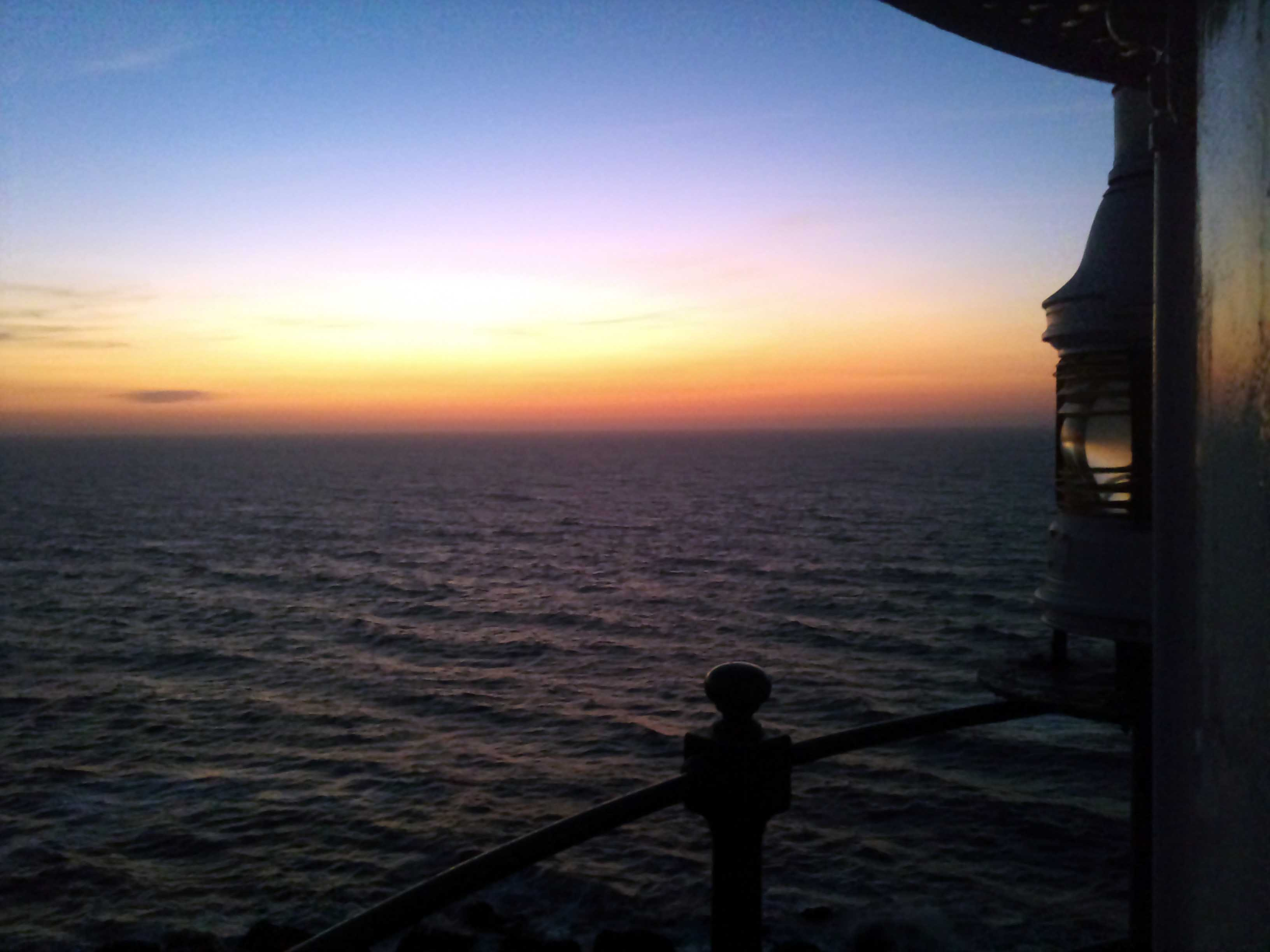
A view from Jaigad Lighthouse

Located 53 kilometers away from Ratnagiri-Ganpatipule, Jaigad can be reached by MSRTC buses from Ratnagiri/Ganpatipule. The village is also accessible via National Highway 17 (NH-17), presently renumbered as NH-66. The Jaigad jetty offers waterway transport between Jaigad and Tawsal, with ferries allowing passengers to travel along with their vehicles.
