= Sonavi River =

River in India

- Native name: सोनवी नदी (Marathi)

Location
- State: Maharashtra
- District: Ratnagiri

Physical characteristics
- Mouth: Shastri River
  - location: Sangameshwar

Sonavi River is a river in Ratnagiri district of Maharashtra. It originates near Prachitgad and merges into Shastri River near Sangameshwar.
