= Gajanan Jagannath Mane =

Indian social worker

- Born: 14 May 1949 (age 77); Dombivli, Maharashtra, India
- Other name: Dombivlikar Kaka
- Occupations: Social worker Indian Navy veteran
- Years active: 1991–present
- Known for: Rehabilitation of leprosy-affected individuals
- Awards: Padma Shri (2013); Sangram Medal (1973)

Gajanan Jagannath Mane (born 14 May 1949), also known as Dombivlikar Kaka, is an Indian social worker and retired Indian Navy veteran. He is known for the rehabilitation of leprosy-affected individuals across the state of Maharashtra for 40 years. In 2013, Mane was conferred the Padma Shri, the fourth-highest civilian honor by the Government of India, in the field of Social work. He won Sangram Medal, a war medal during the 1971 India-Pakistan War.

== Early life ==
He was born on 14 May 1949 in Dombivli, Maharashtra. Mane completed schooling in Ambav Devrukh, his native village in Ratnagiri. His choice to join the Indian Armed Forces was shaped by India's defeat in the 1962 war against China.

== Work ==
He joined the Indian Navy in 1965. He served in the Indian Navy for 12 years and participated in the Indo-Pakistani war of 1971. In 1976, he was retired from the Indian Navy and started working at a private company.

Mane's philanthropic efforts focus on leprosy rehabilitation. He began his work towards leprosy rehabilitation in 1991. He established a colony for leprosy patients in Kalyan, providing shelter and employment. His initiatives led to the construction of a dedicated hospital with the Kalyan-Dombivli Municipal Corporation.

He addressed the livelihood challenges of leprosy patients in Hanuman Nagar leprosy colony by implementing various initiatives. These included establishing a ration shop, facilitating the setup of a municipal hospital for leprosy treatment, organizing schooling for children, and creating employment opportunities for 40 youths from Vasahati within the Kalyan Dombivli Municipality. He also initiated training programs for women in sewing, providing them with sewing machines through a government scheme. He also launched a house-to-house business for the production and marketing of candles, and incense sticks, Chalk sticks, running of a dairy farm contributing to both economic empowerment and community support.

In 2011, the rehabilitation center was awarded the first prize for its dairy farm project by the Sasakawa Leprosy Foundation, Japan.

== Awards and honours ==
Gajanan Jagannath Mane was awarded the Padma Shri in New Delhi by the President of India, Droupadi Murmu in the field of social work in 2023. Previously, Mane received recommendations from the Maharashtra government for the Padma Shri award on two occasions, first in 2015 and then in 2017.

In January 2023, he was felicitated by the Kalyan-Dombivli Municipal Corporation in Thane district for his social work. He earned the Sangram Medal for his service in the Indo-Pakistani War of 1971.

He has received multiple accolades, such as the Gunwant Kamgar Puraskar in 1993 from the Government of Maharashtra, the Kushtha Rugna Seva Karya Puraskar from the Ex-servicemen Board, Thane district, the Kushtha Rugna Seva Puraskar from the Kalyan-Dombivli Municipal Corporation, and the Samaj Utthan Puraskar from the Government of Maharashtra in 2018.
