= Saptalingi River =

River in India

- Native name: सप्तलिंगी नदी (Marathi)

Location
- State: Maharashtra
- District: Ratnagiri

Physical characteristics
- Mouth: Bav River
  - location: Musalmanvadi

Saptalingi River is a river in Ratnagiri district of Maharashtra, India. It originates near Harpude, flows near Devrukh and meets Bav River near Musalmanvadi.
