= Vijaygad Fort =

- विजयगड किल्ला
- Part of Konkan Coast
- Ratnagiri district, Maharashtra

Site information
- Type: Sea Fort
- Owner: Government of India
- Open to the public: Yes
- Condition: Ruins

Location
- Shown within Maharashtra
- Coordinates: 17°18′14.8″N 73°14′26.5″E
- Height: MSL.

Site history
- Materials: Laterite Stone

Vijaygad Fort / (Marathi: विजयगड किल्ला) is a fort located 60 km from Chiplun, in Ratnagiri district, of Maharashtra. This fort is located north of the Jaigad Fort on the northern bank of shastri river creek.

== History ==
Much less history is known about this fort. It is a small fort about an acre in area, it is surrounded by a ditch on the three sides. In 1862 the walls were found to be in ruins and had only one gun. there was no garrison and no water.

== How to reach ==
The nearest town is Chiplun and Guhagar. The fort is close to village Tavsal. A wide motorable road leads to the entrance gate of the fort. It takes about 10 minutes to have a walk around the fort.

== Places to see ==
There is one entrance gate in the fort with some fortification.

== See also ==
- List of forts in Maharashtra
- List of forts in India
- Marathi People
- Maratha Navy
- List of Maratha dynasties and states
- Maratha War of Independence
- Military history of India
