= Devrukh =

Village in Maharashtra

- Town
- Location in Maharashtra, India Devrukh (India)
- Coordinates: 17°03′54″N 73°36′57″E
- Country: India
- State: Maharashtra
- District: Ratnagiri
- Elevation: 187 m (614 ft)

Population (2010)
  - Total: 20,264

Languages
  - Official: Marathi
- Time zone: UTC+5:30 (IST)
- PIN: 415804

Devrukh is a town in the tehsil of Sangameshwar in the Ratnagiri district of the Indian state of Maharashtra. It is headquarters for the Sangameshwar tehsil and a part of the Konkan region. The town enjoys salubrious climate, and the majority population is involved in agriculture. Summers are warm and Winters are not very chilly. Every year Devrukh experiences heavy monsoon (400 cm to 500 cm annual rains). Rice, Cashew and Alphonso (Hapus) Mangoes are the major crops in Devrukh.

== People & history ==
History tells us that Chhatrapati Shivaji Maharaj and Chhatrapati Sambhaji Maharaj visited Devrukh frequently. Chhatrapati Shivaji Maharaj visited Shri Soljai temple many times. Devrukh lies on the shortest way from Raigad fort to Vishalgad fort in the Konkan route. Chousupi in Devrukh is a famous place, which was used as a horse stable during the time of Chhatrapati Sambhaji Maharaj.

Devrukh was the birthplace of social reformer Parvatibai Athavale.

== Water sources ==
Saptalingi River and Bav River are the rivers providing water to this village. Bavnadi is starting from Sahydri hills near to Chandoli sanctuary and Saptlingi also starting from Sahydri hills. Saptlingi means Seven shiva temples situated on the bank if this river like Vadeshwar, Nilkanteshwar etc.

== Educational facilities ==
Devrukh Shikshan Prasarak Mandal, Devrukh, Founded in 1927, is one of the oldest educational institutes from Konkan Region of Maharashtra.

Devrukh, which was set up in 1927, and educates students from Standard V thru' Standard X and boasts of a long list of well placed alumni. The institution has a Jr College of Science named Guruvarya Kakasaheb Sapre Jr College of Science which was started to commemorate the memory of one of its illustrious Head Masters, Late Kakasaheb Sapre. The institution also has set up an English Medium School, Smt. Arudhatee Arun Padhye English Medium School, Devrukh, which has received recognition from the Government of Maharashtra. The school educates from Nursery and kindergarten thru' Standard VIII and is developing further, with a current student strength of about 400 students. Soljai devi Temple is most attractive newly built. Matru Mandir society is a charitable institution that runs many hospitals, farms, hostels, orphanages since 40+ years.

The Rajendra Mane College of Engineering and Technology is located at distance of about 5 km from the town of Devrukh.

== Tourism ==
Saptlingi River: In 2022 the Nagar Panchayat of Devrukh village started boating services in this river for boosting tourism. You will find the total of 7 Shiv temples on the bank of this river so it is called Sapt(7) Ling (Shiv Ling).

Marleshwar: An ancient Cave Shiv Temple, which is at a distance of 17.4 km from Devrukh.

Karneshwar: Built in the Hemadapanthi style of Shiv Temples, located at around 22 km from Devrukh.

Tikleshwar: Located near Devrukh. This temple is on the top of Sahydri Hill. From this place, three villages can be seen.

Kedarling Temple: The Gramdevata of the village Katavli, which is located 10 km from Dervukh.

Soljai Temple: The Gramdevata of this village. Shivaji was visiting this place whenever traveling from Raigad Fort to Vishalgad fort.

Mahipat Fort: Located in Sangameshwar taluka of Ratnagiri district. The fort is spread from south to north and is adventurous for trekking and has good vegetation cover on it. There are many remnants on the fort hidden in the woods. To the north and east of the fort are Kundi and Nigudwadi villages respectively. Every year the local villagers celebrate the festival of Dussehra on the fort.

== Road ==
Devrukh is a small town situated in the Sangameshwar Taluka. It is 17 km from Sangameshwar and 49 km from Ratnagiri. MSRTC provides regular service by which one can reach this place. A lot of private vehicle operators operate vehicles between Sangmenshwar and Devrukh. Devrukh is 100 km from Kolhapur and MSRTC provides frequent service on Kolhapur–Devrukh route as well. It is 210 km from Belgaum.

== Railway ==
There is no direct access for Konkan Railway. But there are few MSRTC buses which ply towards railway station and access for railway station is Sangameshwar & Ratnagiri.
