= Shringarpur =

Village in Maharashtra

Coordinates: 13°06′N 77°45′E

- Village
- Interactive map of Shringarpur
- Country: India
- State: Maharashtra

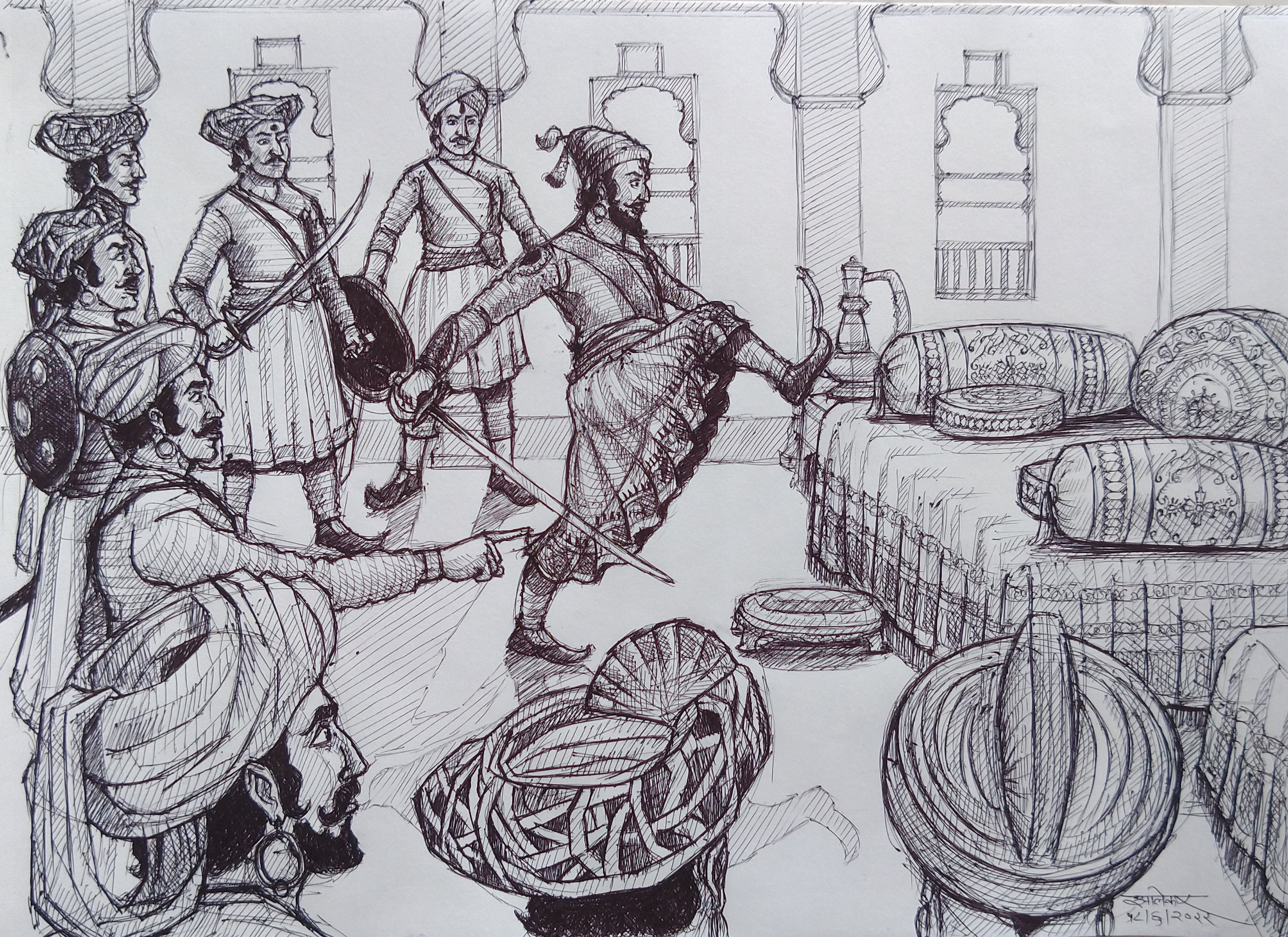
Chatrapati Shivaji attacked Shringarpur on 29th April 1661 and kicked off the throne of Suryarao Surve.

Shringarpur is a small village in Ratnagiri district, Konkan, Maharashtra state, India. It is one of the base villages for the trek to Prachitgad.
