= JSW Vijayanagar Power Station =

JSW Vijayanagar Power station
- Location of the JSW Vijayanagar Power station in Karnataka
- Country: India
- Location: Toranagallu, Bellary, Karnataka
- Coordinates: 15°10′49″N 76°39′42″E
- Status: Operational
- Commission date: Unit 1: 2000, Unit 2: 2009
- Owner: JSW
- Operator: JSW Energy

Thermal power station
- Primary fuel: Coal

Power generation
- Units operational: 2 X 130 MW, 2 X 300 MW
- Nameplate capacity: 860 MW

JSW Vijayanagar Power Station is a coal-based thermal power plant located in Toranagallu village in Bellary district Karnataka. The power plant is operated by the JSW Energy Limited.

The coal for the plant is imported.

== Capacity ==
It has an installed capacity of 1460 MW (2x130, 4x300 MW). The first two units of 130 MW each became operational in year 2000 and other two units of 300 MW each became operational in year 2009.Two more units were set up later as CPP each 300 MW became operational in year 2012 to meet the energy requirement of JSW steel limited.
