= JSW Barmer Power Station =

Building in India

Coordinates: 25.895°N 71.330°E

JSW Barmer Power Station is a coal-based thermal power plant located in Bhadresh village in Barmer district, Rajasthan, India. The power plant is operated by the company JSW Energy Limited.

The coal for the plant is sourced from Kapurdi and Jalipa mines. Water for the power plant is sourced from Indira Gandhi Canal by constructing a 185 km pipeline.

== Capacity ==
It has an installed capacity of 1080 MW (8x135 MW). The plant became fully operational in 2013.

Stage	Unit Number	Installed Capacity (MW)	Date of Commissioning	Status
1	1	135	2009 November	Running
1	2	135	2010 October	Running
1	3	135	2011 November	Running
1	4	135	2011 December	Running
1	5	135	2013 February	Running
1	6	135	2013 March	Running
1	7	135	2013 March	Running
1	8	135	2013 February	Running
