= Jalipa =

- Village
- Location in Rajasthan, India Jalipa (India)
- Coordinates: 25.775°N 71.401°E
- Country: India
- State: Rajasthan
- District: Barmer

Government
  - Body: Village

Languages
  - Official: Hindi
- Time zone: UTC+5:30 (IST)
- ISO 3166 code: RJ-IN
- Vehicle registration: RJ-04
- Nearest city: Barmer
- Lok Sabha constituency: Barmer (Lok Sabha constituency)
- Civic agency: Gram Panchayat

Jalipa is a village situated in Barmer district of Rajasthan, India. A coal mine at the village supplies lignite to the JSW Barmer Power Station.
