= Shastri River =

River in India

Coordinates: 17°18′N 73°14′E

- Native name: शास्त्री नदी (Marathi)

Location
- State: Maharashtra
- District: Ratnagiri

Physical characteristics
- Mouth: Arabian Sea
  - location: Jaigad Fort

Shastri River is a river in Ratnagiri district of Maharashtra. It originates near Prachitgad, flows near Sangameshwar and meets Arabian Sea near Jaigad Fort.
