= Ambav =

Village in Maharashtra

Coordinates: 17.051°N 73.570°E

- Village
- Interactive map of Ambav
- Country: India
- State: Maharashtra

Ambav is a small village situated in Sangameshwar Taluka of Ratnagiri District in the state of Maharashtra, India. Ambav is located 6.2 km from Devrukh, 27 km from its Taluka main town of Sangameshwar, 40 km from Ratnagiri, 280 km from Pune and 312 km from Mumbai

It's part of the Konkan region. The name Ambav comes from the term "Ambyache Van" meaning "Jungle of mangoes". Ambav was formed by merger of two villages 'Kond Kadamrao' and 'Kond Bhujbalrao' . Situated in the mountains ranges of Konkan, Ambav has a mild climate.

== History ==
Ambav was part of the Adilshahi Empire. It was ruled by Bhujbalrao, Kadamrao and Adhatrao Sardars. Bhujbalrao (later surname changed to Mane), Kadamrao and Adhatrao came here from different villages around 500 years ago. The Bhujbalrao's came from Mhaswad and Kadamrao's came from a place named Chandur near Nanded. These three sardars were Killedars of the surrounding forts.

In 1991, there were about 301 homes in Ambav.

Ambav is recognized as the C-Category Religious and Tourist place from the Government of Maharashtra.

Shree Kalishree Devi is the Gram Daivat or the village deity.

Ambav is also known for Rajendra Mane College of Engineering and Technology, founded by Ravindra Mane, which besides Engineering also provides MBA.
