= JSW Energy =

Indian public energy company

JSW Energy Ltd
- Type: Public
- Traded as: BSE: 533148; NSE: JSWENERGY
- Industry: Energy
- Founded: 1994; 32 years ago
- Headquarters: Mumbai, Maharashtra, India
- Area served: India
- Key people: Sajjan Jindal (Chairman); Sharad Mahendra (Joint Managing Director & CEO)
- Products: Electricity generation and transmission, Hydroelectricity, Energy trading, Mining, Power plant equipment manufacturing
- Revenue: ▲₹10,867 crore (US$1.1 billion) (2023)
- Operating income: ▼₹1,822 crore (US$190 million) (2023)
- Net income: ▼₹1,480 crore (US$150 million) (2023)
- Total assets: ▲₹48,742 crore (US$5.1 billion) (2023)
- Total equity: ▲₹18,734 crore (US$1.9 billion) (2023)
- Number of employees: 1328
- Parent: JSW Group
- Website: www.jsw.in/energy

JSW Energy Limited is an Indian power company engaged in power generation, transmission and trading. It is part of JSW Group.

== Power plants ==
- JSW Vijayanagar Power Station, Toranagallu village in Bellary district, Karnataka. It is a 1460 MW (2x130,4x300 MW) plant.
- JSW Ratnagiri Power Station, Nandiwade village near Jaigad in Ratnagiri district, Maharashtra. It is a 1200 MW (4x300 MW) plant.
- JSW Barmer Power Station, Bhadresh village in Barmer district, Rajasthan. It is a 1080 MW (8x135 MW) plant.
- Karcham Wangtoo Hydroelectric Plant, Kinnaur district, Himachal Pradesh. It is a 1,091 MW hydropower plant commissioned in 2011, acquired in 2015
- Baspa-II Hydroelectric Plant, Kinnaur district, Himachal Pradesh. It is a 300 MW hydropower plant which was commissioned in 2003, acquired in 2015
- Vijaynagar Solar Plant, Vijaynagar, Karnataka.It is a 225 MW Solar power plant which was commissioned in 2022.
- In 2015, JSW Energy acquired two of Jaypee Group's hydropower plants, with a combined capacity of 1,391 MW, for ₹9,700 crore.
