= Marleshwar =

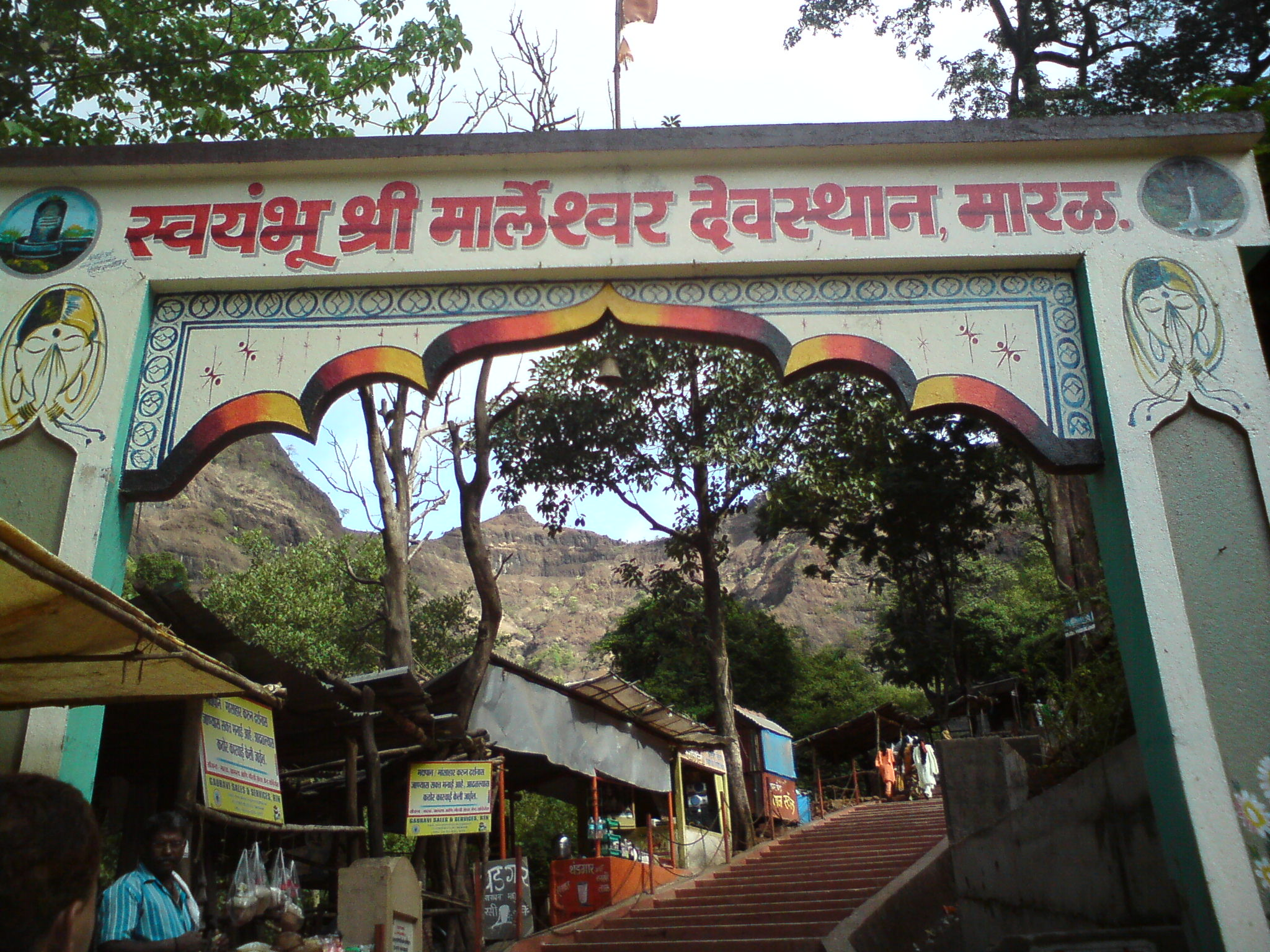
Marleshwar (मार्लेश्वर)
- village
- Location in Maharashtra, India
- Country: India
- State: Maharashtra
- District: Ratnagiri

Languages
  - Official: Marathi
- Time zone: UTC+5:30 (IST)
- Telephone code: 02354
- Vehicle registration: MH-08

Marleshwar is a small Shiva temple in Sangameshwar subdivision of Ratnagiri district in the Indian state of Maharashtra.

== Gallery ==
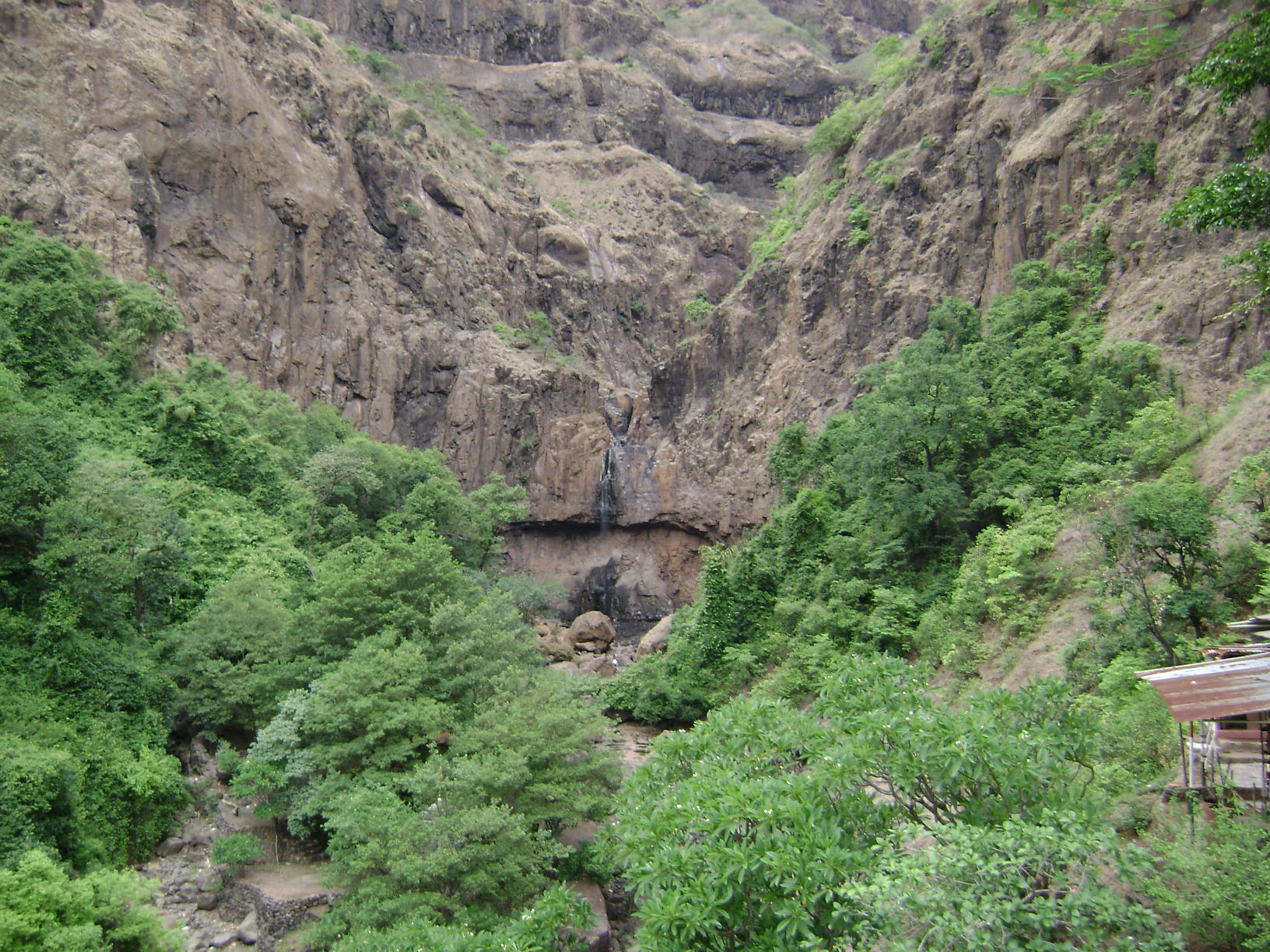
Marleshwar waterfall

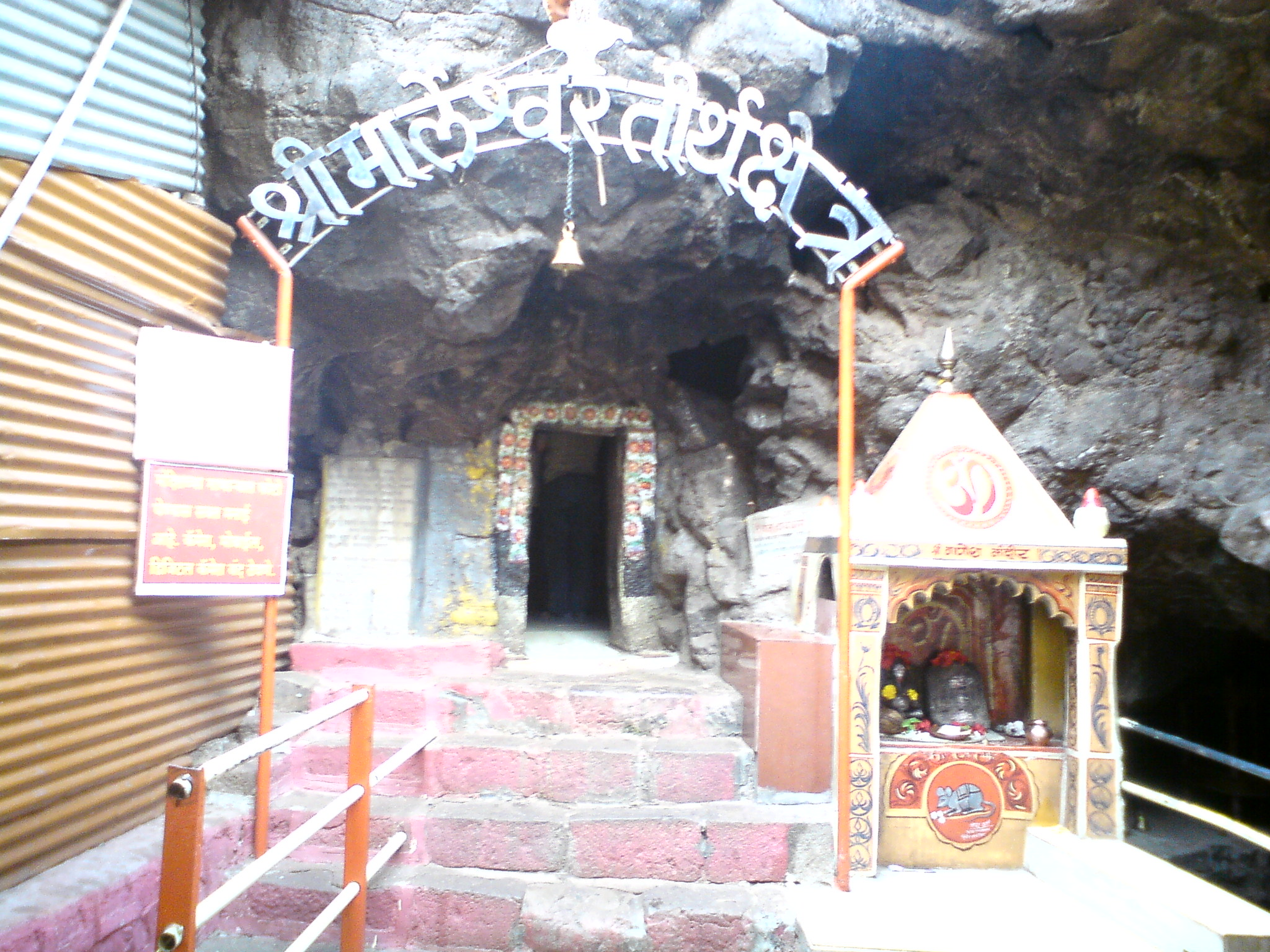
Marleshwar temple

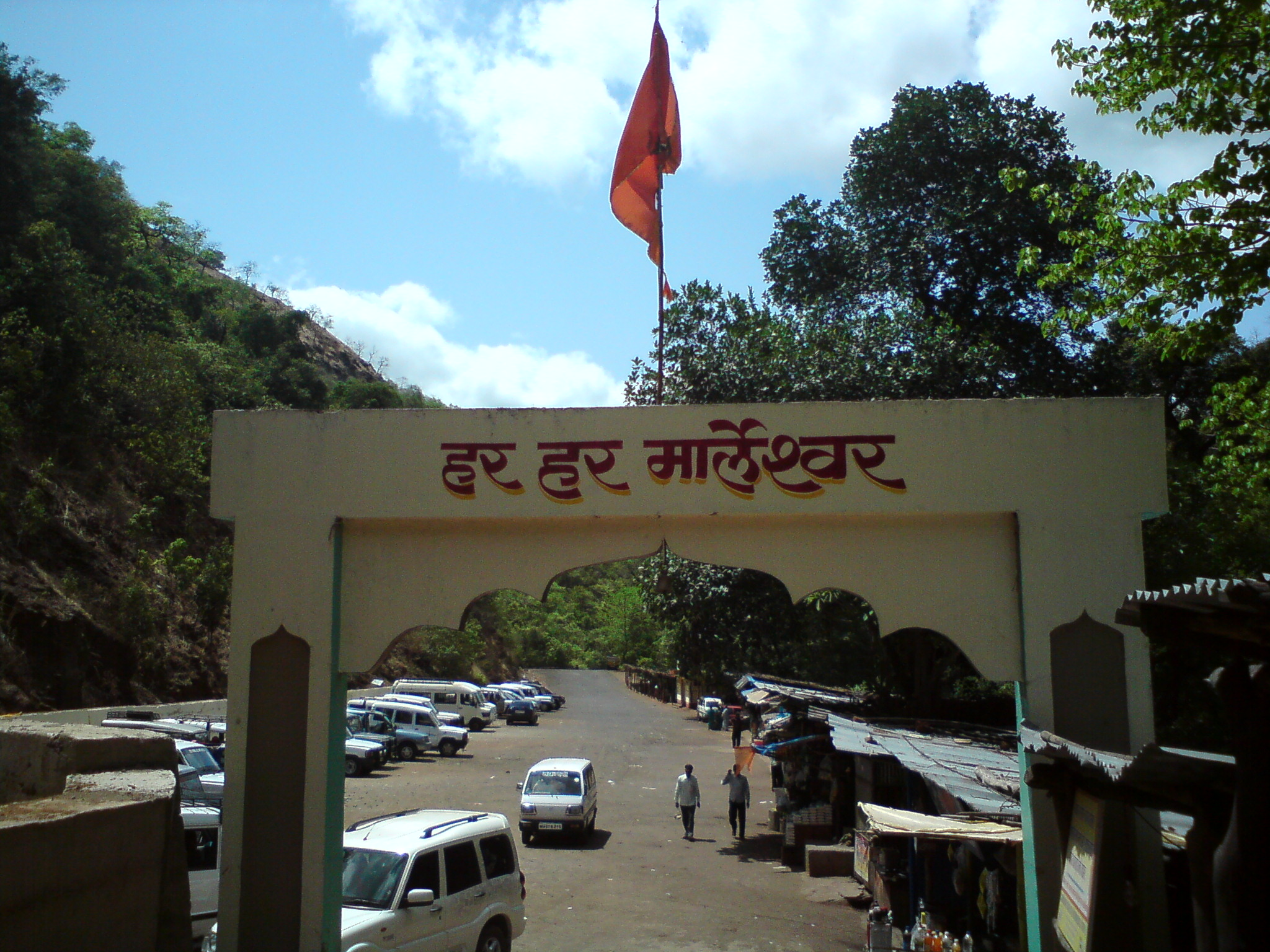
Har Har Marleshwar

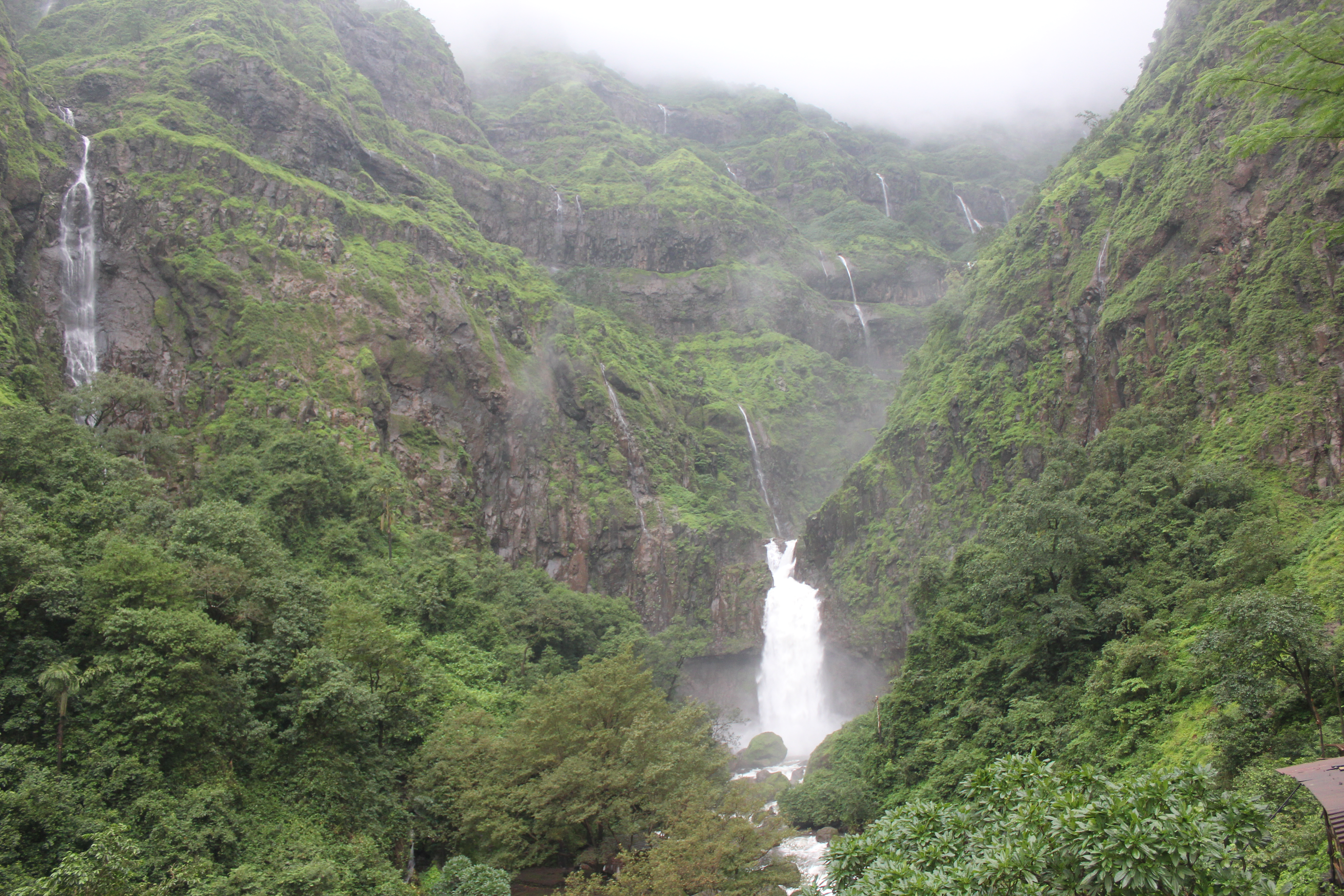
Marleshwar Waterfall

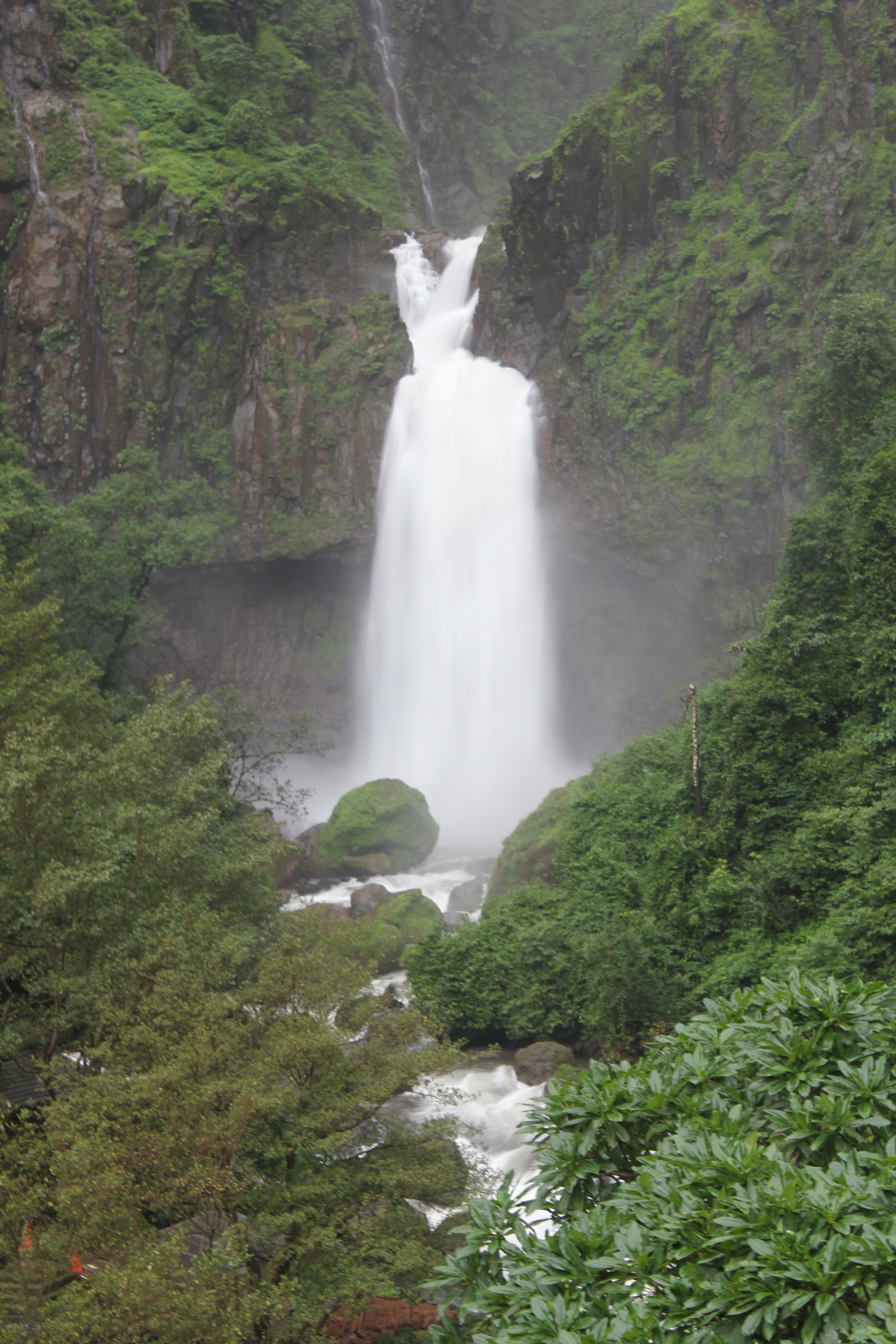
Marleshwar Waterfall - Close Up
