= JSW Ratnagiri Power Station =

Power station in Maharashtra, India

- Country: India
- Location: Maharashtra
- Coordinates: 17°17′49″N 73°12′46″E
- Status: Operational
- Construction began: 2011
- Commission date: 2010
- Owner: JSW Group
- Operator: JSW Energy Limited (JSWEL).

Thermal power station
- Primary fuel: Coal

Power generation
- Nameplate capacity: 1,200 MW

External links
- Website: www.jsw.in/energy/jsw-energy-ratnagiri-plant

JSW Ratnagiri Power Station is a coal-based thermal power plant located in Nandiwade village near Jaigad in Ratnagiri district Maharashtra. The power plant is operated by the JSW Energy Limited (JSWEL).

The coal for the plant is imported.

== Capacity ==
It has an installed capacity of 1200 MW (4x300 MW). The plant became fully operational in year 2011.
