= Prachitgad =

Fort in India

- Part of former Maratha Empire, now Maharashtra
- Prachitgad, Shirala Taluka, Sangli District, Maharashtra

Site information
- Type: Hill fort
- Owner: Government of India
- Open to the public: Yes

Location
- Shown within Maharashtra
- Coordinates: 17°13′34″N 73°41′30″E
- Height: 976m(3200 ft)

Site history
- Built: 1404
- Built by: Rana Jakhuray Surve
- Materials: Stone, lead

Garrison information
- Past commanders: Rana Jakhuray Surve, Rana Suryarao Surve, Chattrapati Shivaji Maharaj, British Government, Chattrapati Shahu Maharaj
- Occupants: Rana Jakhuray Surve, Rana Suryarao Surve, Chattrapati Shivaji Maharaj, British Government, Chattrapati Shahu Maharaj

Prachitgad is a fort in the Sahyadri mountain range in Sangli district of Maharashtra state, India. It covers an area of 5 acres (20,000 m^{2}).

== Location ==
It is located at 17°13′34″N 73°41′30″E on the western edge of Chandoli National Park in Sangli district but easiest way to reach is from Ratnagiri district at Shringarpur.It is located on the boundaries of 4 districts Sangli, Kolhapur, Ratnagiri and Satara. It is very remote place to reach from Sangli side due to dense forest and mountain terrain. The closest city is Sangameshwar which is approximately 22 km away. The place is accessible only by foot from Shringarpur near sangmeshwar which is a 5 to 8 hour climb and trek through treacherous terrain or from chandoli dam which is a 14- to 15-hour walk through the forest.

== History ==
Prachitgad was built by Rana Jakhuray Surve in 1404. It's masonry suggests that it was rebuilt by Rana Suryarao Surve during the Muslim rule (16th century). The Maratha king Shivaji captured the fort in 1660s, and repaired it.

RaoRana Shurveer Suryarao (Suryaji) Surve, Maratha noble, who was respected and valued by Chatrapati Shivaji despite being his adversary. His divan Shirke betrayed him which led Shivaji to win this fort in 1660. The battle was led by Tanaji Malusare with 1000 soldiers. RaoRana Suryajirao Surve had only 150 soldiers as Shirke - divan had purposely intoxicated all soldiers. After surrendering this fort RaoRana Shurveer Suryajirao moved his capital to Sonawade near Shringarpur, due to cowardly winning the battle Shirkes were not allowed to interfere Prachitgad activities. Sambhaji use to come there to meet RaoRana Shurveer Neelkanthrao surve who shifted his capital from Sonawade to Tulasani near Devrukh . Today Jadhavs and Mhaskes are staying there.

After Chatrapati Sambhaji, it does not appear in historical records as the site of any notable event until 1817, when it was captured by Chitursingh, the younger brother of the Raja of Satara. On 10 June 1818, the fort was captured by a British East India Company force led by Colonel Cunningham. By 1862, the fort was in ruins, and had been deserted.

== Places to visit ==
- Being in the Chandoli National park Prachitgad is studded with beautiful spots. Two main spots being Sada and Kandhar Doh. Sada is the formation made up of frozen lava. Kanddhar Doh is the water fall on the Warana River.
- There is old Bhairav Bhawani temple at Prachitgad
- Ancient Sun temple called as Kunkeshwar near Sangameshwar

== Nearest towns ==
- Sangli
- Ratnagiri
- Kolhapur
- Islampur
- Shirala

== Nearest railway stations ==
- Sangli railway station
- Sangameshwar
- Ratnagiri
- Kolhapur

== See also ==
- List of forts in Maharashtra
