= Bav River =

River in India

- Native name: बाव नदी (Marathi)

Location
- State: Maharashtra
- District: Ratnagiri

Physical characteristics
- Mouth: Jaigad River
  - location: Karjuve

Bav River is a river in Ratnagiri district of Maharashtra. It originates in the Western Ghats and flows near Marleshwar. It swells in the Sahayadri mountain ranges and flows into Arabian Sea.

In July 2022, parts of Ratnagiri were inundated due to heavy rains resulting in the overflow of many rivers including Bav River.

The coordinates of Bav River are in the Konkan division of Maharashtra are: Latitude: 17°09'00"N and Longitude: 73°30'00"E.
