= Ganpatipule =

Town in Ratnagiri district, Maharashtra, India

- Town
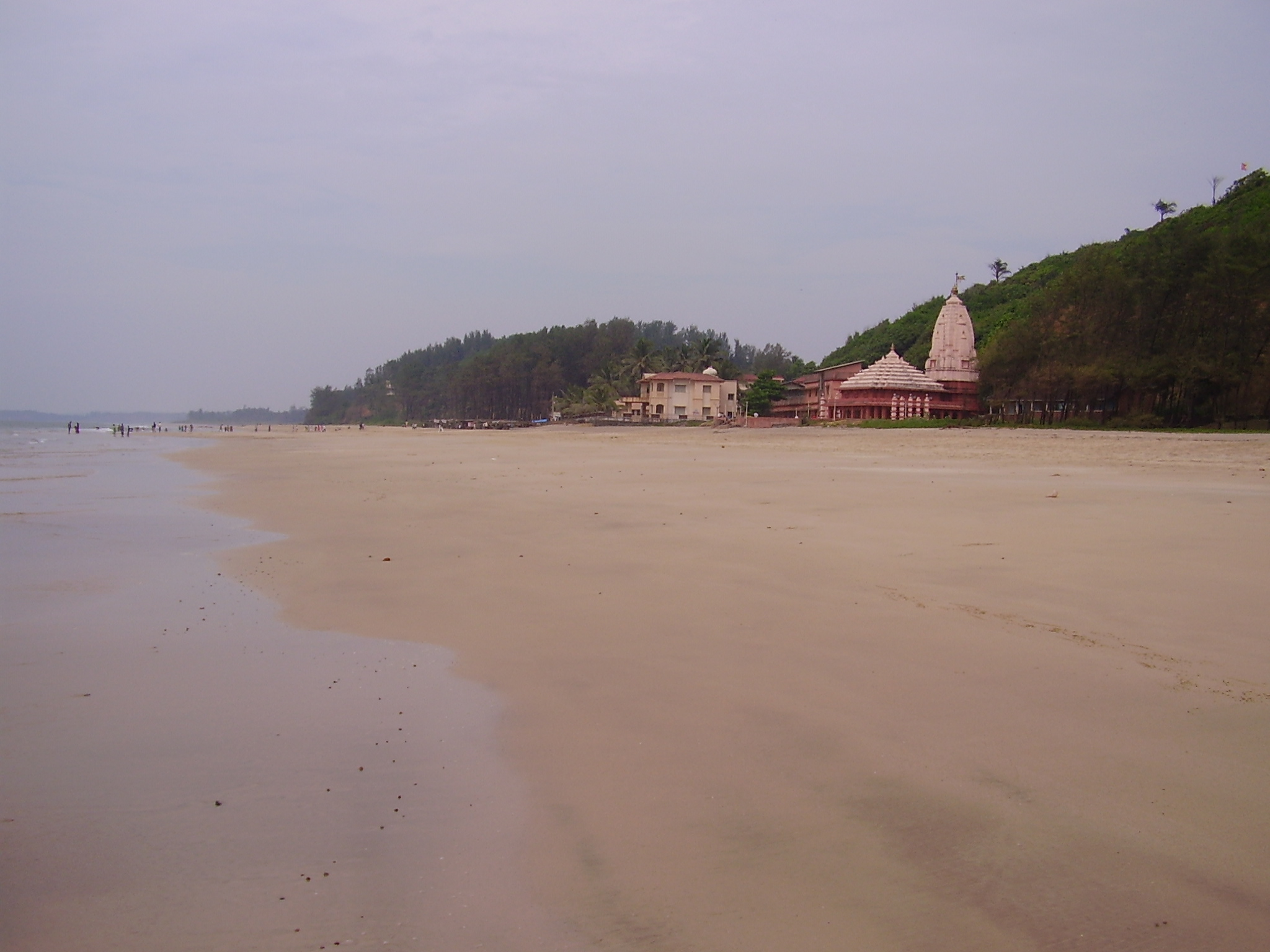
- Ganapatipule beach

- Location in Maharashtra, India
- Coordinates: 17.1448°N 73.2666°E
- Country: India
- State: Maharashtra
- District: Ratnagiri
- Named for: Lord Ganesha

Government
  - Type: Indian
- Elevation: 0 m (0 ft)

Population (2011)
  - Total: 1,236
- Demonym: Ganpatipulekar

Language
  - Official: Marathi Maharashtrian Konkani
- Time zone: UTC+5:30 (IST)
- PIN: 415 622
- Vehicle registration: MH-08

Ganpatipule (Marathi: गणपतीपुळे) is a coastal town in Ratnagiri district of Maharashtra. Due to its Ganpati mandir, the town is a popular Hindu pilgrimage and tourist destination.

The town is situated near Ratnagiri city, which is the seat of its namesake district. Chiplun town is located on its north side.

== Etymology ==
According to local folklore, the Hindu god Ganpati, taking umbrage at a remark made by a native lady, moved to Pulé पुळे ( transl. Forward) from his original abode of Gulé. Thus, the region was named Ganpati-pulé.

The 400-year-old Ganpati idol at Ganpatipule is said to have sprung up from the soil.

== Ganpatipule mandir ==
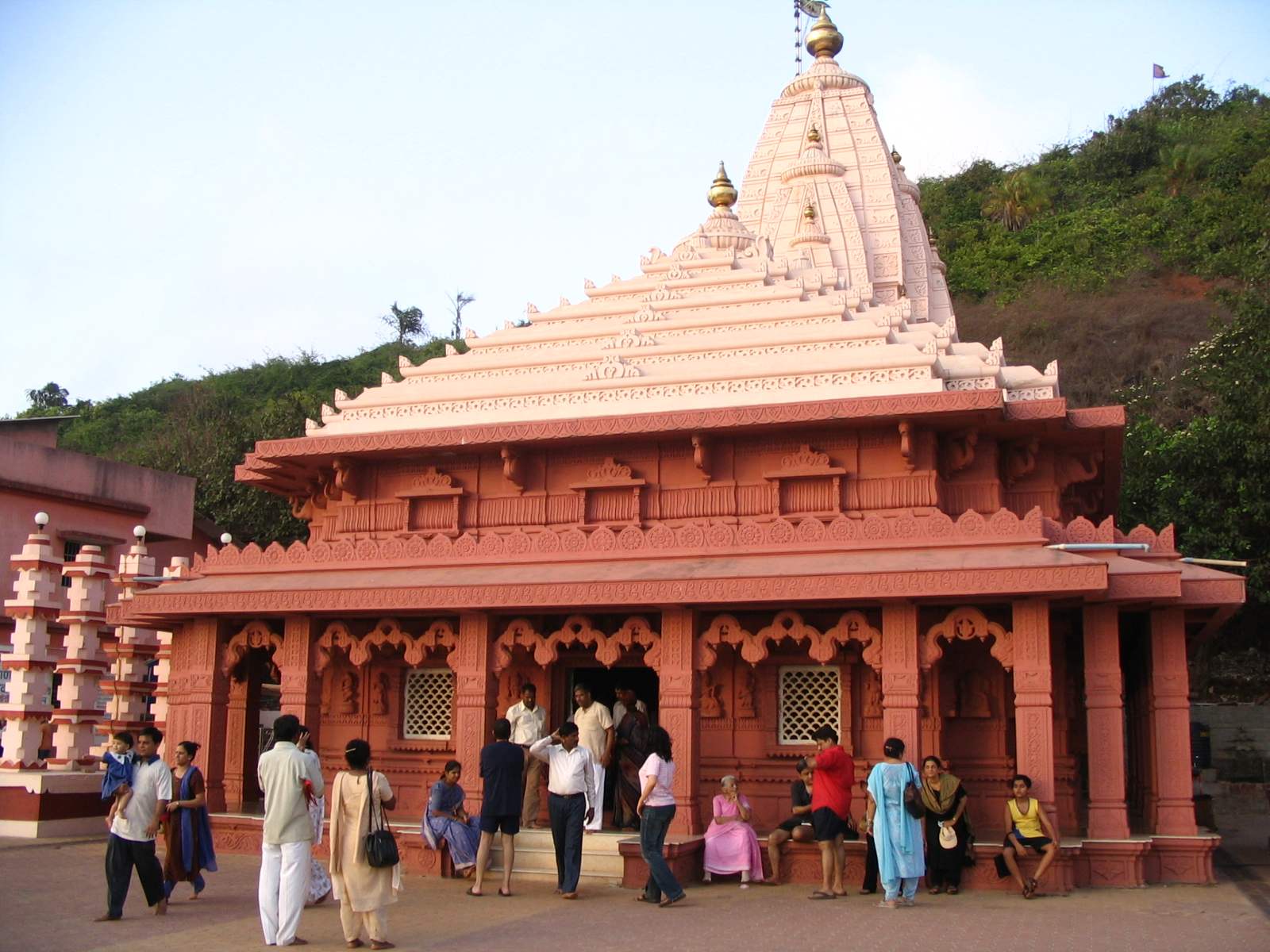
Ganpatipudhe temple

Ganpatipule town is a small town with about 100 houses, situated approximately 375 km south of Mumbai city, along the Konkan Coast. The beach near the town is a popular tourist destination.

The Ganpatipule temple has a Swayambhu murti. Every year, thousands of devotees across Maharashtra visit the temple. The murti faces West. Ganapatipule town is rich in flora; it has plenty of mangroves and coconut trees.

The Ganapatipule Grampanchayat governs the town.

== Climate ==
After March, the temperature rises but rarely crosses 30 °C. May is the hottest month, reaching 40 °C. The monsoon lasts from June to October.

== Demographics ==
Marathi is the most widely spoken language. Hindi and English are understood and spoken by many. Ganpatiphule Grampanchayat / Ratnagiri runs Marathi medium schools. The nearest college is at Malgund. There are many villages in Ganapatipule which are full of greenery. The main occupation of the villagers is agriculture and the service business. Rice and coconut are the most common crops in this area. Many festivals are celebrated along the Konkan Coast. Among the most significant are Gauri Ganpati and Magh Chaturthi (the fourth day of the lunar month of Magh).

== Tourism ==
With tourism development, several resorts and hotels have opened in this small town, the most significant of which is the Maharashtra Tourism Development Corporation resort near the beach. Other resorts and spas include Greenleaf Resort, Abhishek Beach Resort and Spa, Areopagus Spa, and The Blue Ocean Resort and Spa, Hotel Heramb in Ganpatipule and a few smaller hotels, Bhakt Nivas, available for tourists in this town.

== Nearby places ==
The village of Velneshwar, situated north of the Shastri River, has its own peaceful, coconut-fringed beach, where one can relax in tranquility. The village comes alive each year during the Maha Shivaratri fair, when pilgrims in large numbers visit the Old Shiva Temple. According to folklore, a fisherman had found a statue in his net, which he had promptly thrown back into the sea. He again found the statue back in his net. Angered by this, he banged the statue on a stone, but the statue started bleeding. The fisherman placed the statue in a small temple, which grew into the Velneshwar Shiva Temple.

About 26 km from Ganapatipule lies the district headquarters town of Ratnagiri. This region has a significant illustrious past including mentions in Indian mythology.

Malgund, a small village 1 km away from Ganpatipule, is known as the birthplace of the Marathi poet Keshavasuta, born in 1866. He is regarded as a poet who heralded the dawn of modern Marathi poetry. There is a monument at Malgund dedicated to his work, and a museum where one can find information on most modern-day poets of the Marathi language.

Resting on a cliff, at the entrance of the Sangameshwar river, just 20 km from Ganapatipule, is Jaigad Fort. This 16th-century fort offers a view of the sea and Konkan village life. A 15 km back road connects Ganpatipule to Jaigad via Malgund.

Besides its natural environment, Pawas is well known for the Ashram of Swami Swaroopanand, a spiritual leader who influenced an entire generation of Maharashtrians. The distance from Ratnagiri to Pawas is approximately 20 km. The lighthouse has extensive views, around 6–7 km from Jaigad Fort. It was completed in 1932 and is still operational and serving on the coast. Around 13.7 km north on the route to Jaigad Fort from Ganpatipule Ganesh temple is the newly built Jai Vinayak temple. The temple has pagoda-style architecture. The temple was built in 2003 by the JSW group when they launched their thermal power project at Jaigad.

== Transportation ==
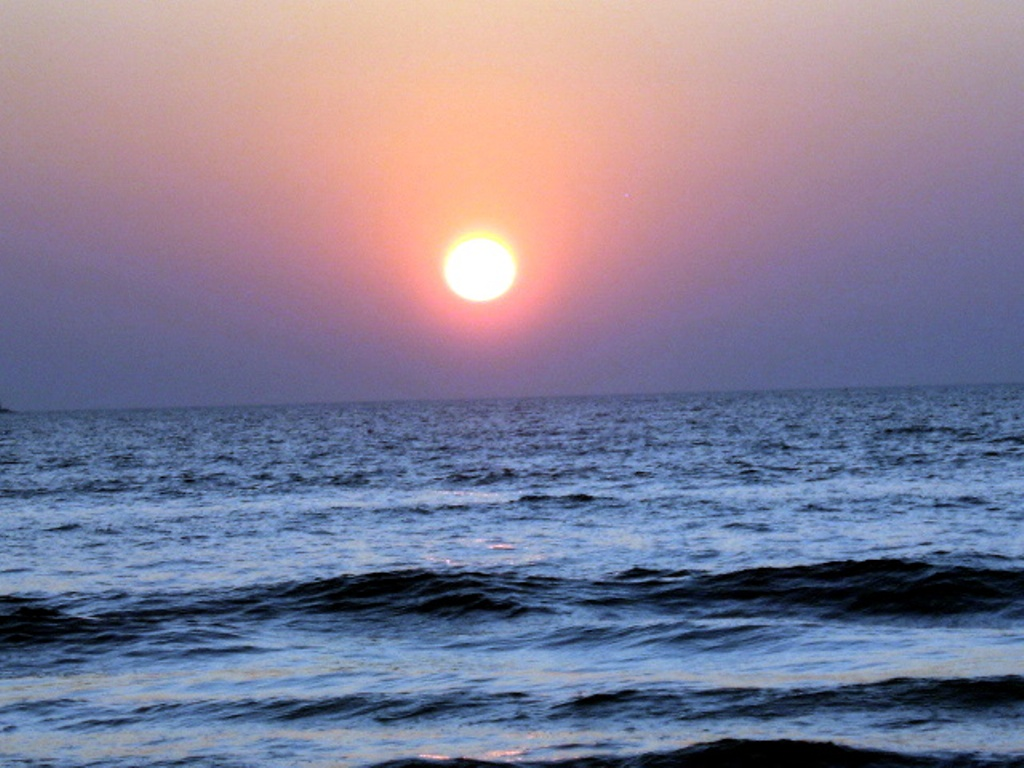
Sunset at the Ganapatipule beach

The town has a small bus stand. State transport buses to Kolhapur and Pune are available. The town is easily accessible from the port city of Ratnagiri, which has a railway station and an airport.

=== Road ===
Ganapatipule is 32 km from Nivali, a small village on Mumbai Goa Road (NH 17). From Nivali, one has to turn right for Ganapatipule. The distance from Nivali to Ratnagiri is around 20 km. The distance from Nivali to Hatkhamba is around 4 km. From Hatkhamba, one has to take a right turn for Ratnagiri, which is 16 km from here. Sangameshwar is about 25 km from Nivali and 45 km from Chiplun. From Ganapatipule, one can approach Ratnagiri directly without coming to Nivali and going through Hatkhamba. The direct road has many more turns and is narrower compared to NH-17. That distance is around 30 km. Mumbai is 375 km away via Mahad, and Pune is 331 km away via Satara. Ganapatipule is also connected with other cities by state transport buses for fast journeys. Buses from major cities like Mumbai, Pune, Sangli, Kolhapur and Solapur to Ratnagiri are available. From Ratnagiri, private cabs also ply to the town.

==== Bus ====
There are frequent buses from the MSRTC Bus Station (Ratnagiri) to Ganapatipule via Ratnagiri Railway Station, Nevade Road and MSRTC Bus Station (Ratnagiri) to Ganapatipule via Ratnagiri Railway Station, Nevade Road, Malgund. One can reach Ganapatipule faster by taking the MSRTC City Bus from Ratnagiri Railway Station to MSRTC Bus Station (Ratnagiri) and then changing buses there to a bus to Ganapatipule via Arevare. There are MSRTC buses from Mumbai, Pimpri-Chinchawad, Pune, Swarget (Pune), Miraj, Chiplun, Deorukh Sawantwadi (only seasonal), and Panjim (only seasonal).

Private buses ply between Mumbai / Pune to Ganpatipule via Ratnagiri. Neeta Travels: Borivali (Mumbai) to Ganpatipule via Ratnagiri. Purple Travels (MTDC): Borivali (Mumbai) to Ganpatipule via Ratnagiri.

=== Train ===
There is no railway station at Ganapatipule. The nearest railway stations are at Ratnagiri and Bhoke. All express passenger trains stop at Ratnagiri, a city. Bhoke is a small village and only Dadar passenger trains will stop there.
