= Jaigad Fort =

Fort in Ratnagiri district, Maharashtra, India

- Part of the Maratha Empire
- Jaigad, Ratnagiri district, Maharashtra
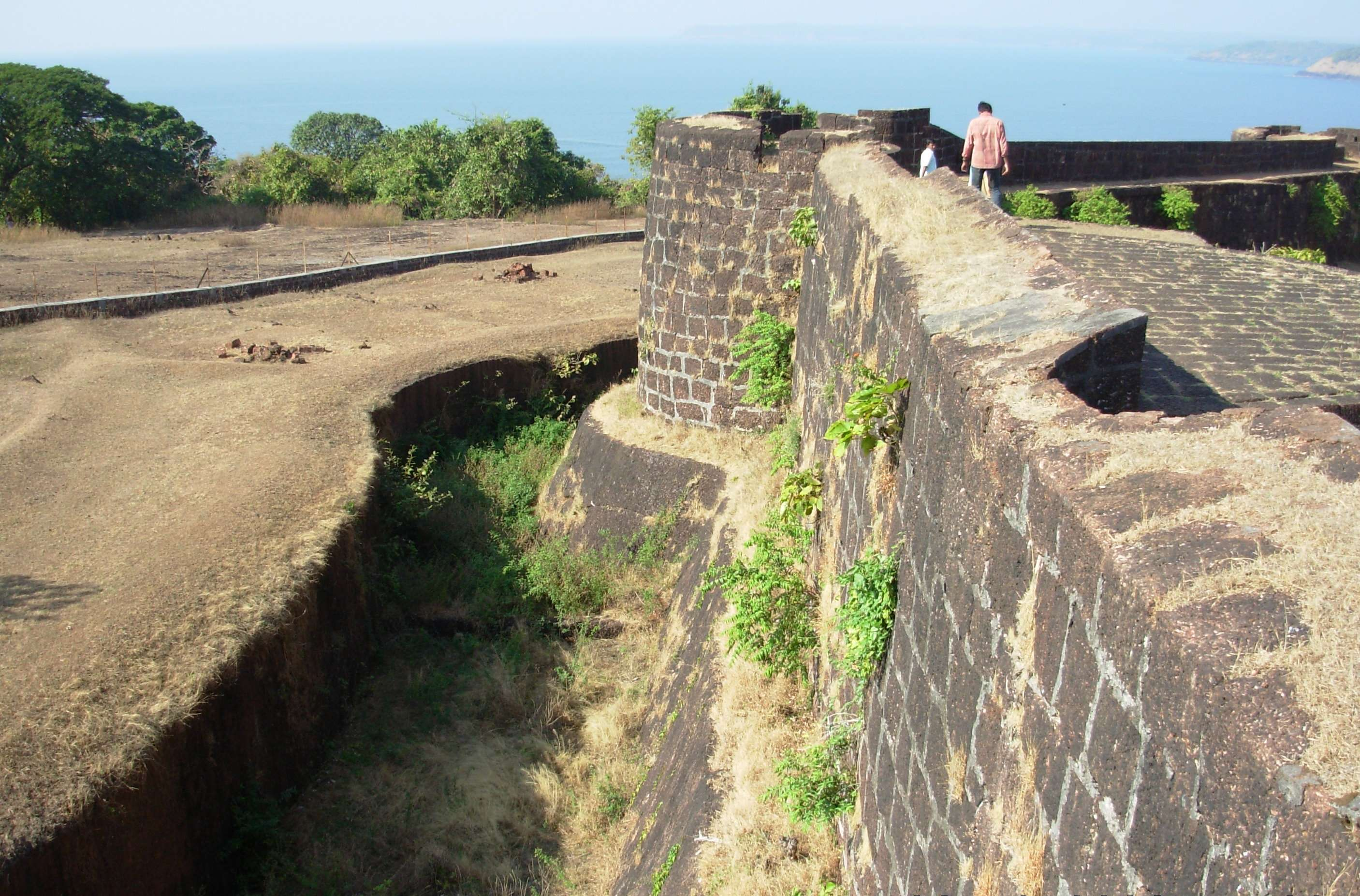
- Western Wall of the Jaigad Fort

Site information
- Type: Coastal Fortification
- Controlled by: Bijapur; Konkan Pirates; Sangameshwar; Maratha Empire (1713-1818); United Kingdom: East India Company (1818-1857); India (1857-1947); India (1947-)
- Open to the public: Yes
- Condition: Protected Ruins

Location
- Jaigad
- Coordinates: 17.3007°N 73.2215°E

Site history
- Built by: Presumed to be Sultan of Bijapur, strengthened by Kanhoji Angre

Jaigad Fort, Jayagaḍa killā) (Also transliterated as Zyghur in old British records.) is a coastal fortification that is located at the tip of a peninsula in Jaigad, Ratnagiri District at a distance of 14 km from the temple town of Ganpatipule, in the state of Maharashtra, India. Nestled on a cliff, it overlooks a bay formed where the Shastri river enters the Arabian Sea. It has a commanding view of the bay, the nearby power plant and the open sea. A jetty port Angrey, and a lighthouse is located nearby. Although in ruins, most of the fort's outer wall and ramparts still stand. A deep moat surrounds the fort side not facing the cliff edge. In the middle of the 13 acre fort lies the palace of Kanhoji Angre, a Ganpati temple and wells to store water. It is a protected monument.

== History ==
Jaigad fort is said to have been built by Bijapur Kings in the 16th century. Later it passed into the hands of Naiks of Sangameshwar. He had 7-8 villages and 600 troops under his command. He defeated combined forces of Bijapur and Portuguese in 1583 and 1585. In 1713, Jaigad was one of the ten forts which was ceded by Balaji Vishwanath Peshwa to Kanhoji Angre. In June 1818 this fort was captured by British without any struggle.

== See also ==
- Jaigad Village
- List of forts in Maharashtra
- List of forts in India
- Maratha Navy
