= Sangameshwar =

Sangameshwar Taluka संगमेश्वर
- Taluka
- Location in Maharashtra, India
- Coordinates: 17.187°N 73.553°E
- Country: India
- State: Maharashtra
- District: Ratnagiri

Languages
  - Official: Marathi
- Time zone: UTC+5:30 (IST)
- PIN: 415611
- Telephone code: 02354
- Vehicle registration: MH-08

Sangameshwar Taluka is a taluka in Ratnagiri subdivision of Ratnagiri district in the Indian state of Maharashtra. The headquarters for the taluka is the town of Devrukh. In Sangameshwar the two rivers Sonavi and Shastri flow together. The meaning of Sangama in Sanskrit (and most Indian languages) is "confluence," and so the name "Sangameshwar". It is historically important as the place where Chhatrapati Sambhaji Maharaj, son of Chhatrapati Shivaji Maharaj was captured by the Mughal Emperor Aurangzeb.

== Geography ==
The city lies on the confluence of the Shastri River and Sonavi River. To the east of the city lie the Western Ghats and to the west lies Ganpatipule. The region has a tropical climate. The 'rainy season' — the monsoon lasts normally from June till October.Sangameshwar has hot water springs like other surrounding areas in the Konkan region.

== Transportation ==
The nearest bus stand is Sangameshwar S.T. Stand (MSRTC) nearly 4 km from Sangameshwar Road railway station . The Sangameshwar railway station is located on National Highway 66 (Mumbai - Goa Highway). The nearest main bus depot is Devrukh of MSRTC nearly 13 km from Sangameshwar S.T. Stand from where you can reach to Sakharapa and then Kolhapur also from Devrukh you can reach to Ratnagiri and Lanja city.

=== Railways ===
Sangameshwar Road (SGR)
Next 'small' station towards Mumbai: Kadavai	Konkan Railway : Railway (India)	Next 'small' station from Mumbai: Ukshi
Next 'small' station towards Mumbai: Kadavai	Distance from Mumbai (CST) = 384 km	Next 'small' station from Mumbai: Ukshi
Next 'main' station towards Mumbai: Chiplun	Konkan Railway: Railway (India)	Next 'main' station from Mumbai: Ratnagiri

== Attractions ==
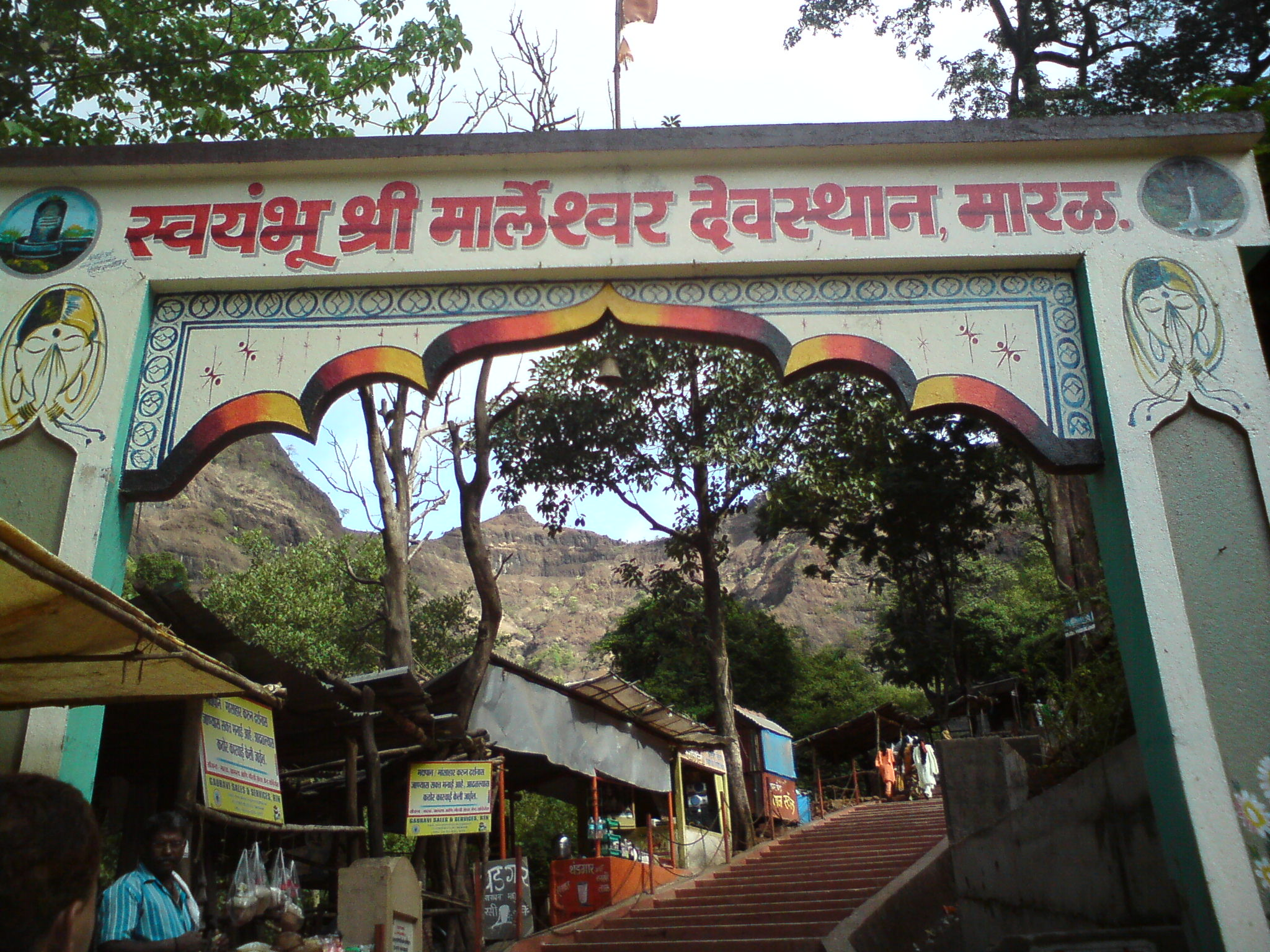
The Marleshwar temple entrance.

- Marleshwar Cave Shiva Temple, a cave temple located in the Sahyadris about 17 km from Devrukh and 44 km from Sangameshwar Road railway station (Konkan Railway).

== Gallery ==
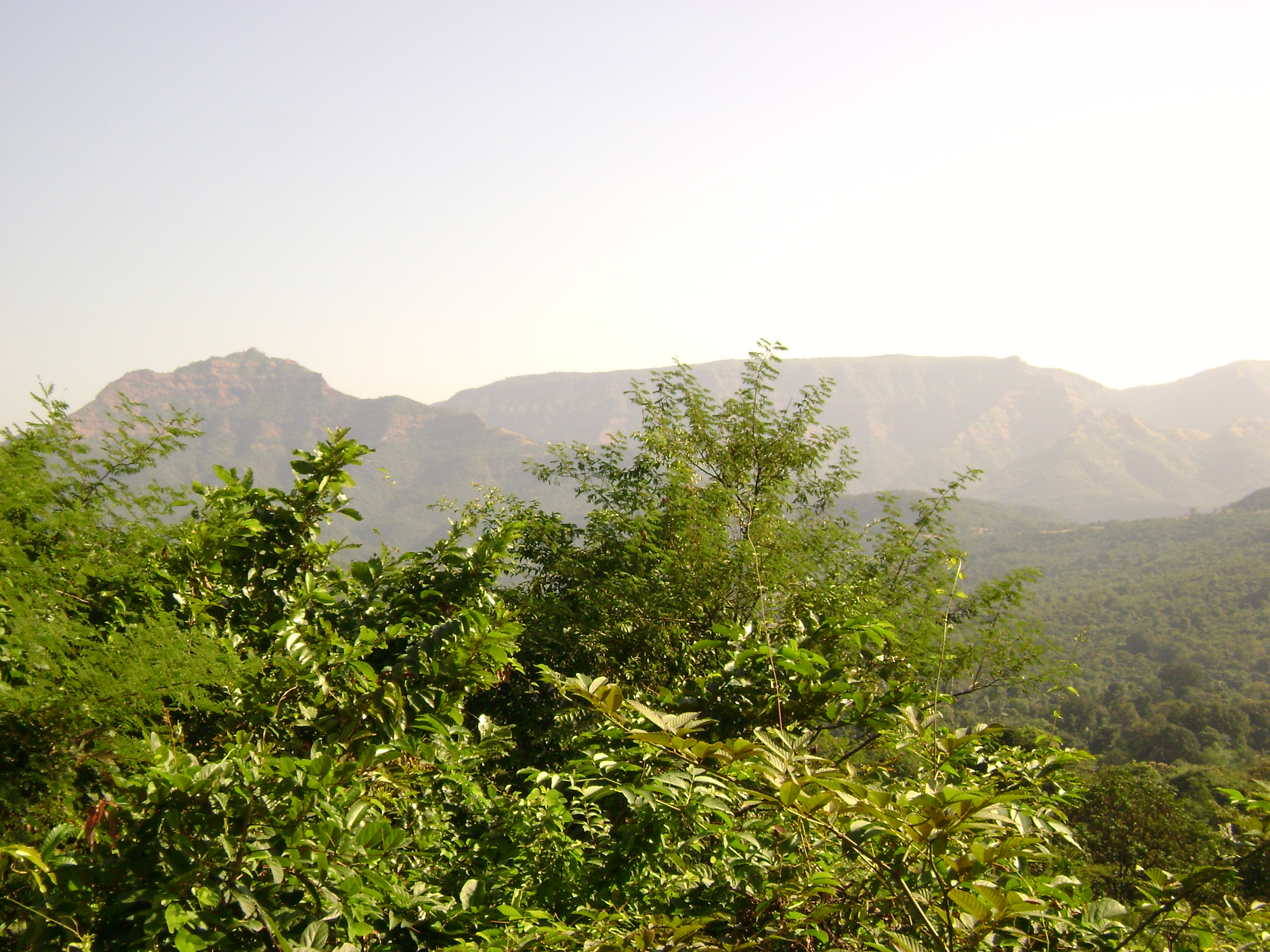
Sangameshwar scenery

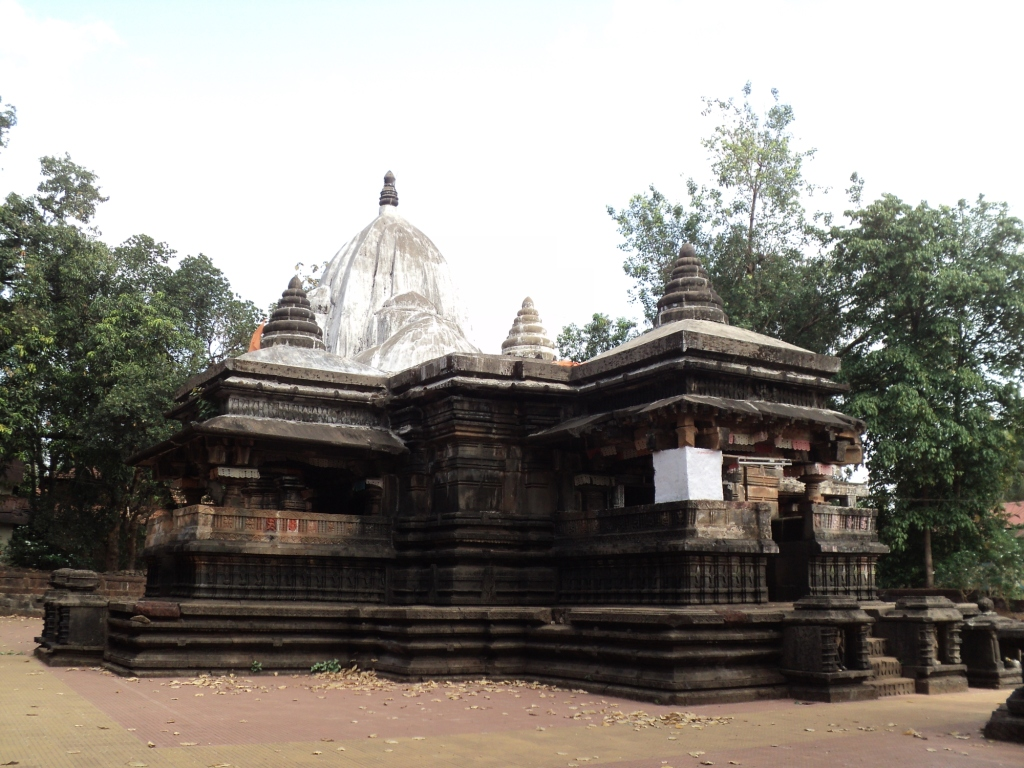
Karneshwar Temple

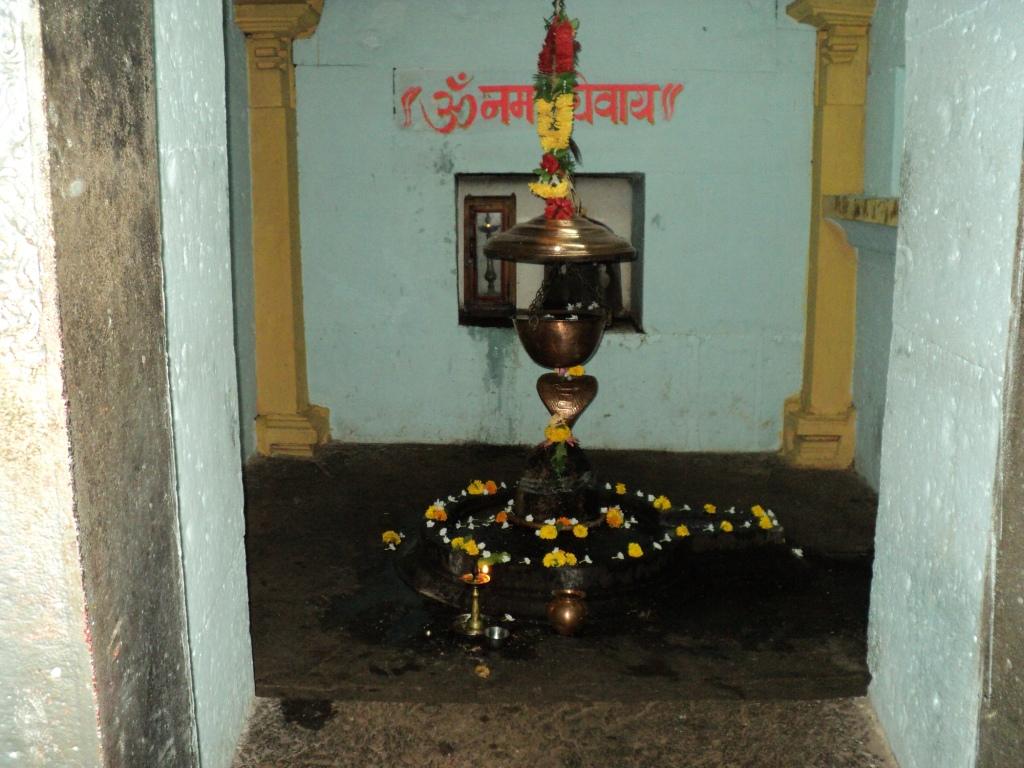
Karneshwar Temple

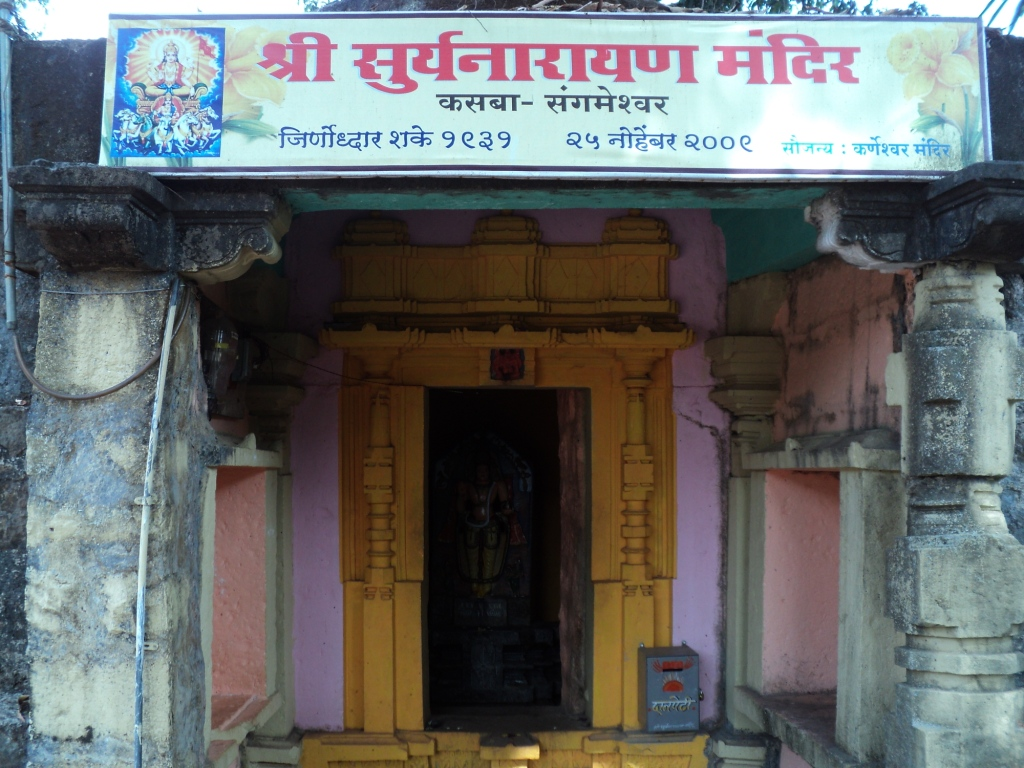
Suryanarayan Temple

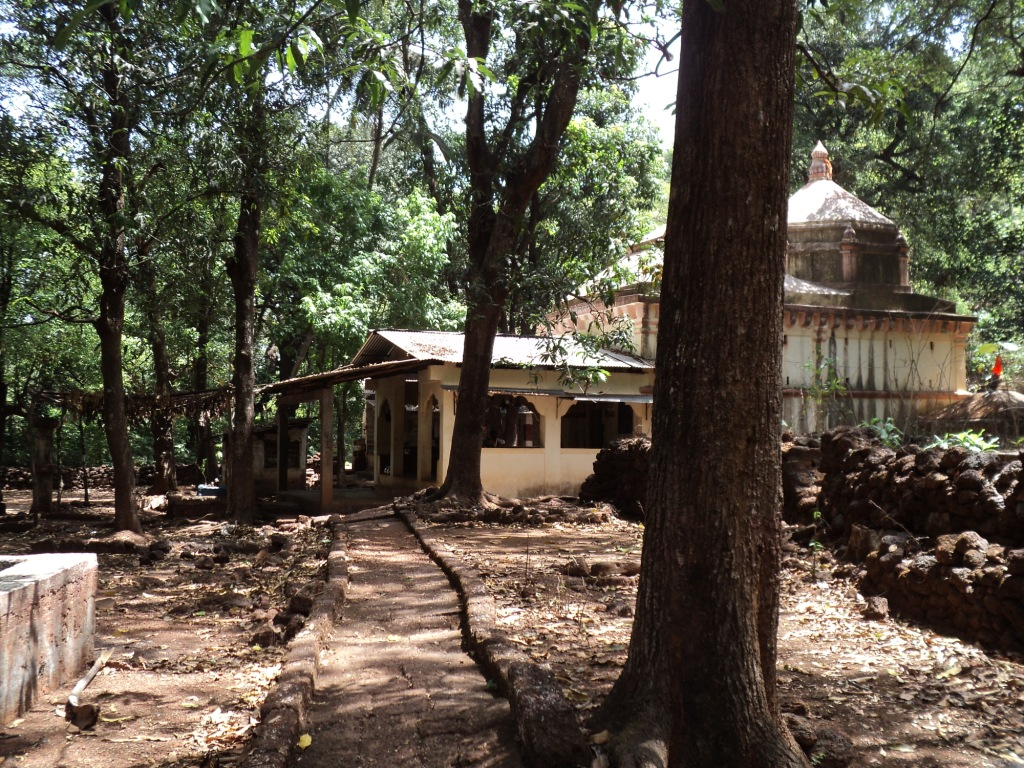
Sapteshwar Temple

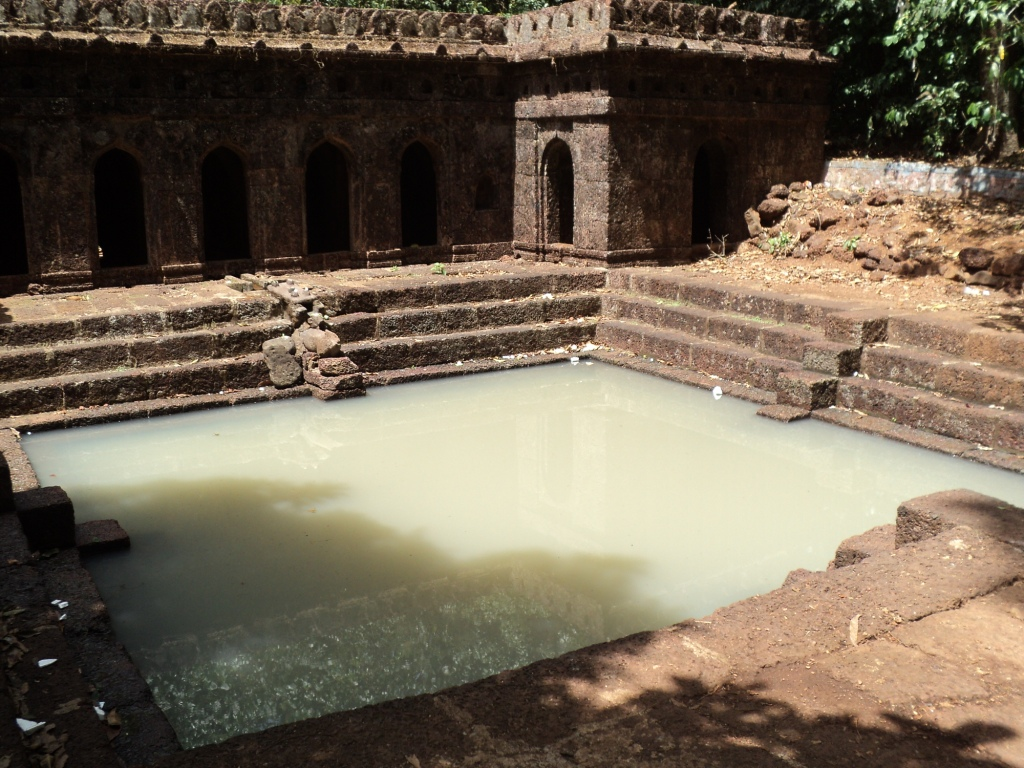
Sapteshwar Temple

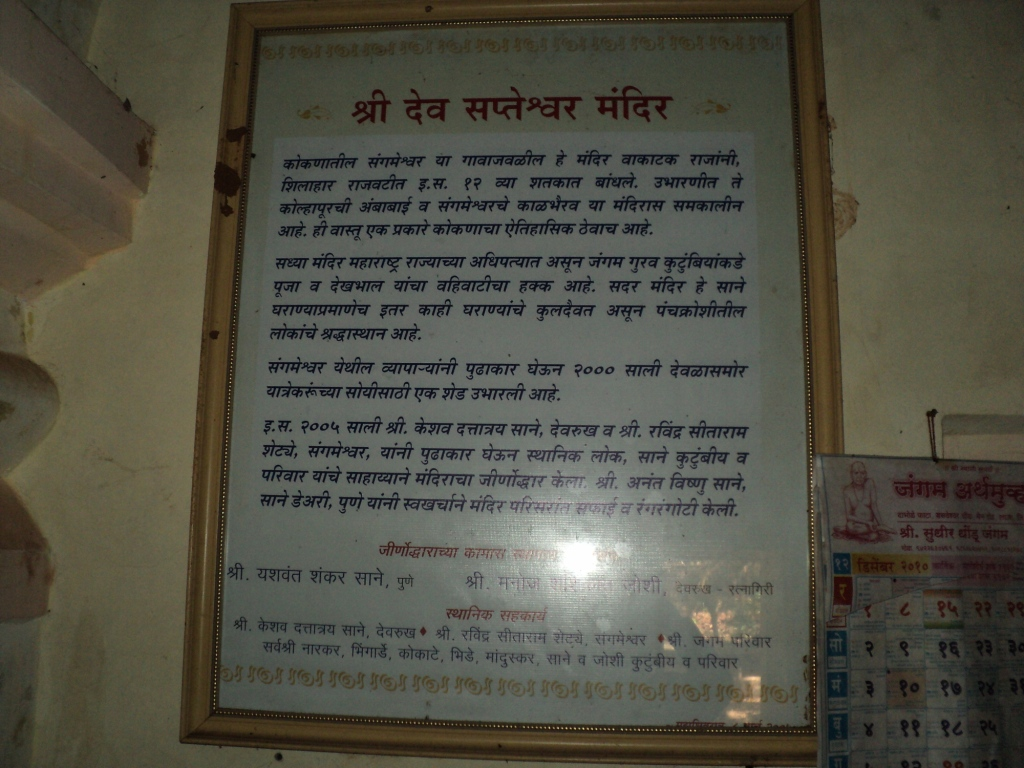
Sapteshwar Temple Information Board

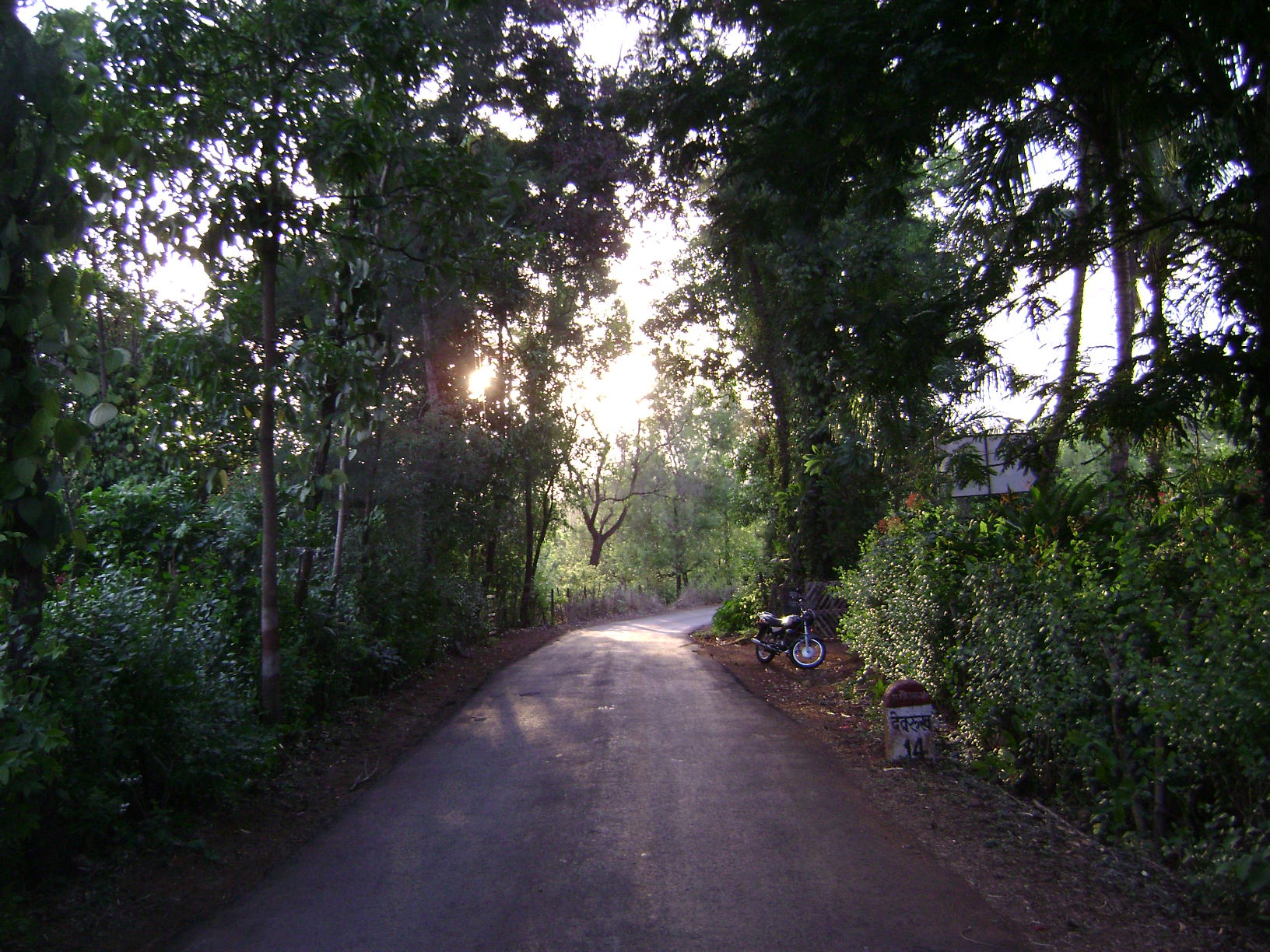
Devrukh - Marleshwar road

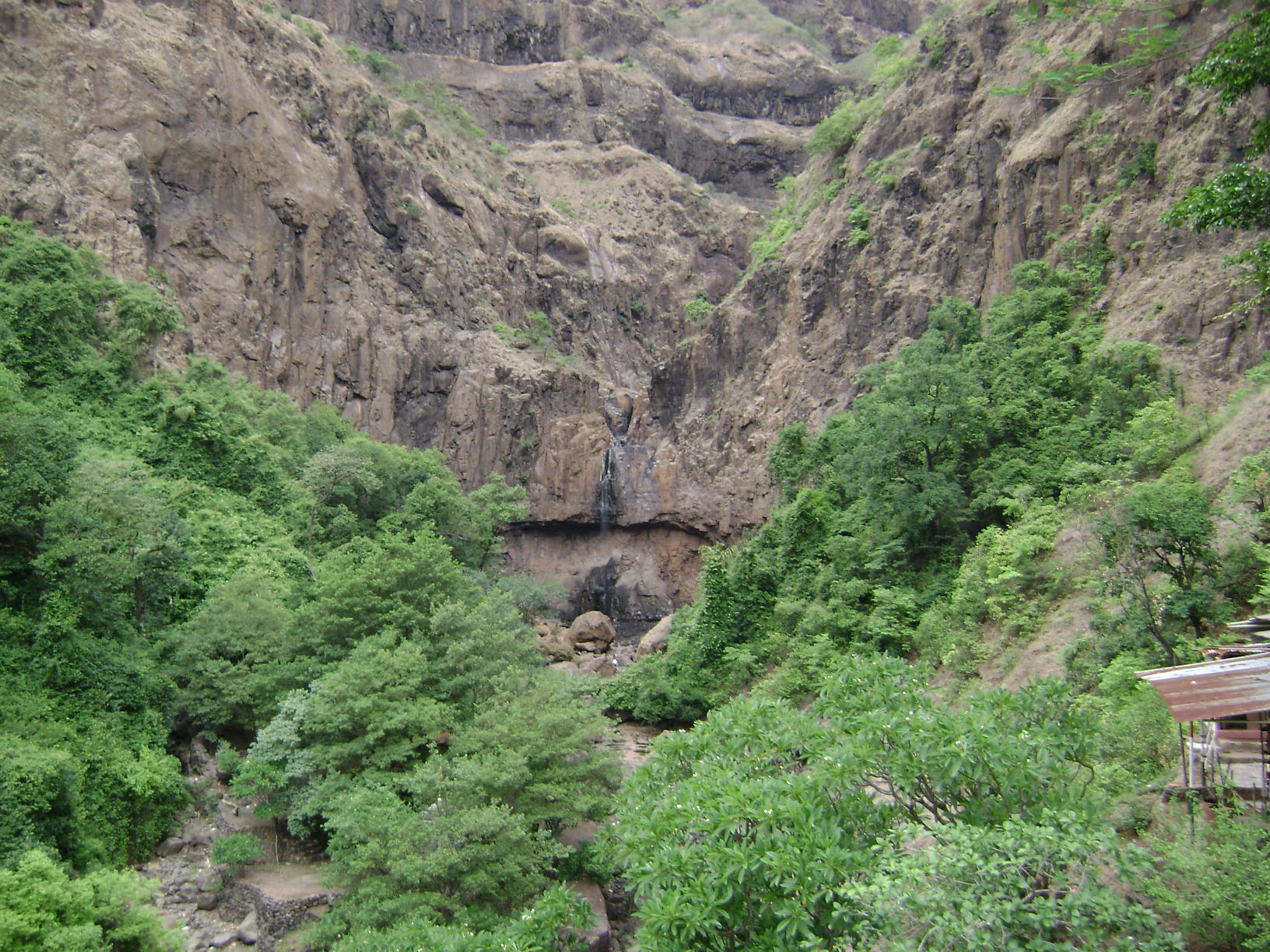
Marleshwar waterfall
