= Kolkewadi Dam =

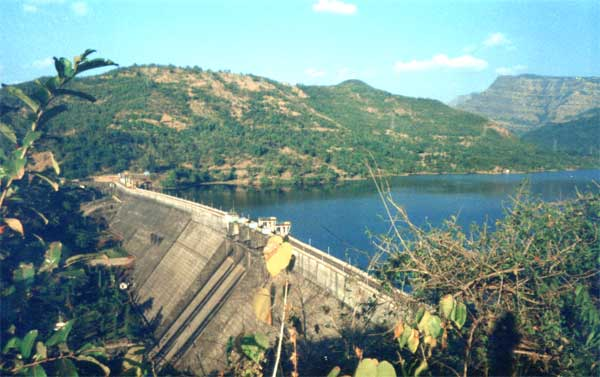
- Kolkewadi Dam from a distance

- Location within Maharashtra
- Official name: Kolkewadi Dam D05103
- Location: Maharashtra, India
- Coordinates: 17.4730°N 73.6438°E
- Opening date: 1975

Dam and spillways
- Impounds: Vashishti River
- Height: 63.3 metres (207.7 ft)
- Length: 497 metres (1,631 ft)

Kolkewadi Dam or Kolkiwadi Dam is a dam located in the Konkani region, Ratnagiri district of Maharashtra, India. It is located in Kolkiwadi, about 3.0 km (1.9 miles) near the village of Alore, near Chiplun.

== Description ==
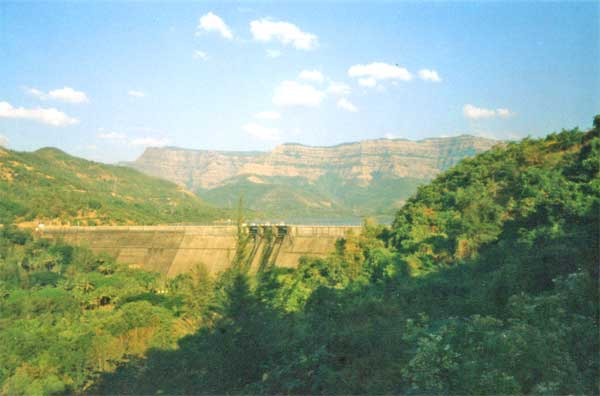
The dam up close

The dam is part of the Koyna Hydroelectric Project. It contributes in the 3rd stage of power generation of the Koyna Hydroelectric Project. The electricity is generated in the underground power station located at the base of the dam. The total installed generating capacity of the 3rd stage of the project is 320 MW. The project is run by the Maharashtra State Electricity Board, also known as the MSEB. The area behind the dam is one of the most sparsely populated areas in the state.

The spillway of the dam is located at the center. It has 3 radial gates.

== See also ==
- Konkan division
- Vashishti River
- Western Ghats
