= Helwak =

- town
- Location in Maharashtra, India
- Coordinates: 17.3850°N 73.735°E
- Country: India
- State: Maharashtra
- District: Satara
- Elevation: 588 m (1,929 ft)

Languages
  - Official: Marathi
- Time zone: UTC+5:30 (IST)
- PIN: 415207
- Telephone code: 02372

Helwak is a town on the Chiplun–Karad highway in the state of Maharashtra, India just off the Kumbharli Ghat. It is located near the Koyna Dam in Satara at an elevation of 588 metres (1,929 ft).
