= Bhawani Waghjai Temple, Terav =

Shree Bhawani Waghjai Temple, Terav
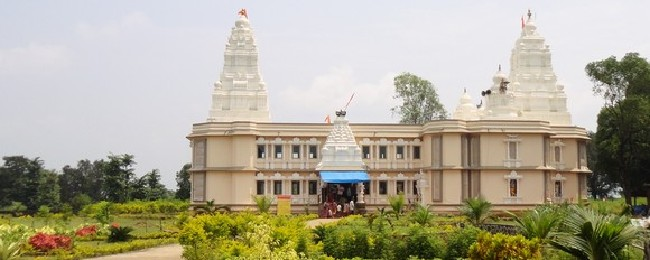
- Shree Bhawani Waghjai Temple, Terav (Chiplun, Ratnagiri, Maharashtra, India)

- Location in Maharashtra

Religion
- Affiliation: Hinduism
- District: Chiplun
- Deity: Bhawani
- Festivals: Navaratri, Sama, Chaitavali

Location
- Location: Terav
- State: Maharashtra
- Country: India
- Interactive map of Shree Bhawani Waghjai Temple, Terav
- Coordinates: 17.478520°N 73.537239°E

Architecture
- Type: South
- Creator: Terav Villagers
- Completed: 14 May 2003

Specifications
- Temple: 1
- Monument: 4

Website
- http://www.bhawaniaai.org

The Shree Bhawani Waghjai Temple, Terav is a Hindu temple dedicated to the goddesses Bhawani and Waghjai. It is located in village Terav, Taluka Chiplun, Dist. Ratnagiri, Maharashtra. The original temple was built circa 1860.

Government of Maharashtra has declared this temple as one of the tourist places in Maharashtra.

This temple is 123 ft in length with a width of 76 ft on south side and 36 ft on north side. Height of foundation is 4 ft with internal height of 22 ft. Temple houses goddesses Bhawani, Waghjai, Kalkai and Navdurga along with Lord Shiv Shankar.

== History ==
The temple of Shree Bhawani Waghjai was built by ancestors 350 years back. It was first rebuilt in 1839. Over the years, temple underwent extensive wear and tear which made villagers to decides to build a new temple in its place.

== Temple Reconstruction ==
-In 2002, Terav Community decided to reconstruct the temple, and Shree Kulaswamini Bhawani Waghjai Trust was instituted. Everyone related to this village decided to contribute towards expenses of temple rebuilding. Those working in Cities contributed their one-month salary, retired people contributed their one month's pension, businessmen contributed their one-month income, farmers and workers contributed Rs. 1000 each. Temple reconstruction started on 14 May 2003, with the blessings of Bharati Maharaj, Aalandi.

== Temple Details ==
This temple is 123 ft in length with a width of 76 ft on south side and 36 ft on north side. Height of foundation is 4 ft with internal height of 22 ft. There are 4 sections in temple. These sections house various deities like Shree Bhawani, Shree Shiv Shankar, Navadurga, Waghjai and Kalkai. All four sections have carefully designed domes of South Indian styles. One dome has small statue of Shree Hanumant. Dome above statue of Goddess Bhawani is of 55 ft height from ground. Temple has large hall with a capacity of accommodating around 2000 people, with a balcony of 100 ft. Temple has two large doors of 40 ft. It also has various beautiful statues all around it.

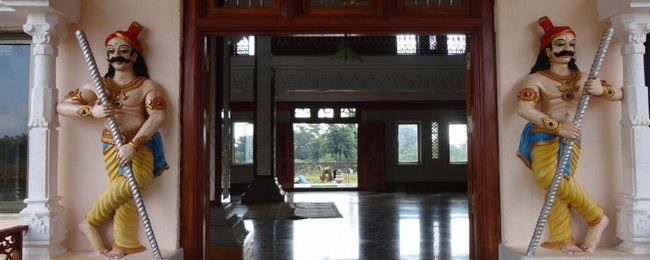
Doors of Bhawani Wagjai Temple of Terav

== Statue of Goddess Bhawani ==
Main statue of Goddess Bhawani is of 9 ft height and made of black stone. She has various weapons in her hand depicting killing of demon Mahishasura.

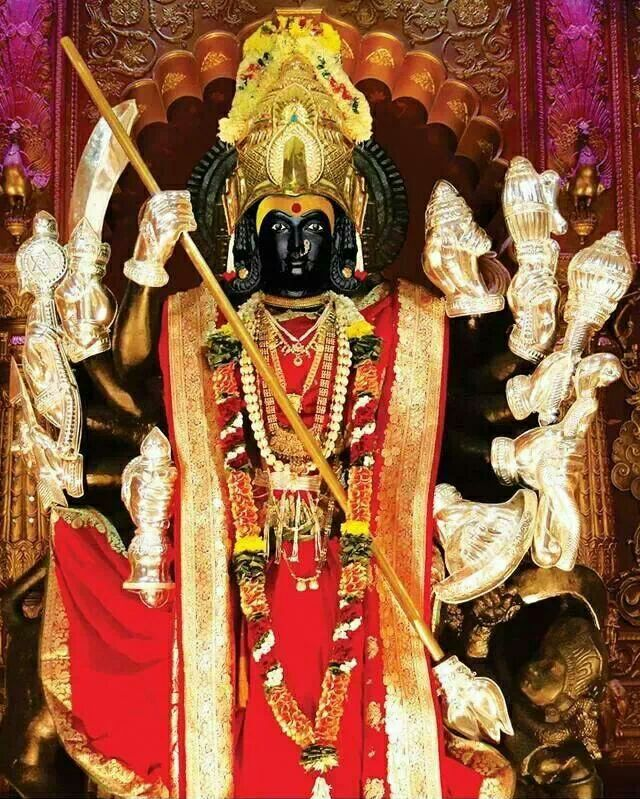
Statue of Bhawani Aai at Terav

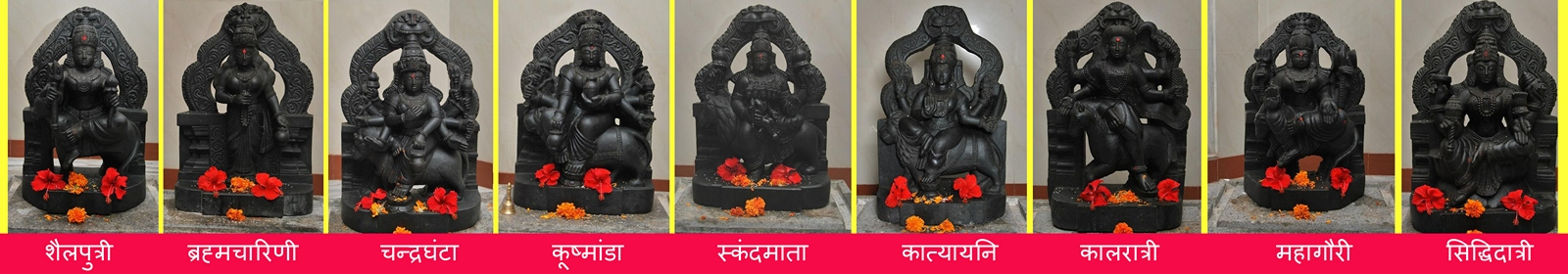
Navadurga Statues at Bhawani Waghjai Temple, Terav, Chiplun, Ratnagiri, Maharashtra

== Outside Temple ==
This temple has 7 gardens with a big semicircular garden on east side. Temple also has large forest with big trees.

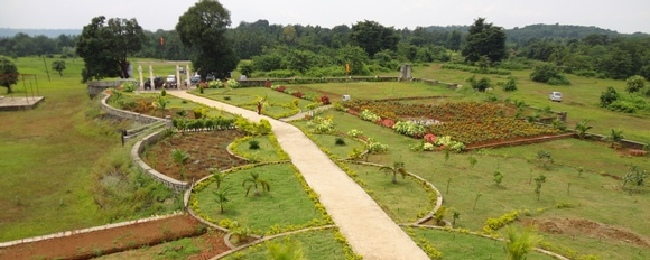
Garden in Front of Bhawani Waghjai Temple of Terav

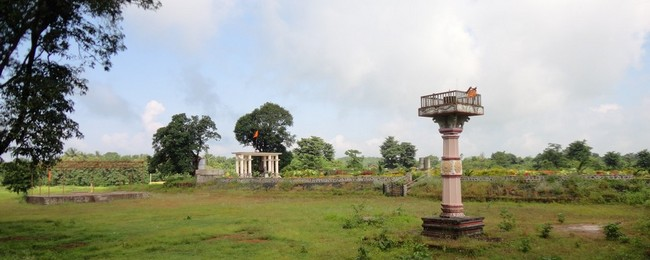
Lat in front of Bhawani Waghjai Temple of Terav
