= Pophali =

- town
- Location in Maharashtra, India
- Coordinates: 17.451°N 73.626°E
- Country: India
- State: Maharashtra
- District: Ratnagiri

Languages
  - Official: Marathi
- Time zone: UTC+5:30 (IST)
- PIN: 415601
- Telephone code: 02355
- Vehicle registration: MH-08

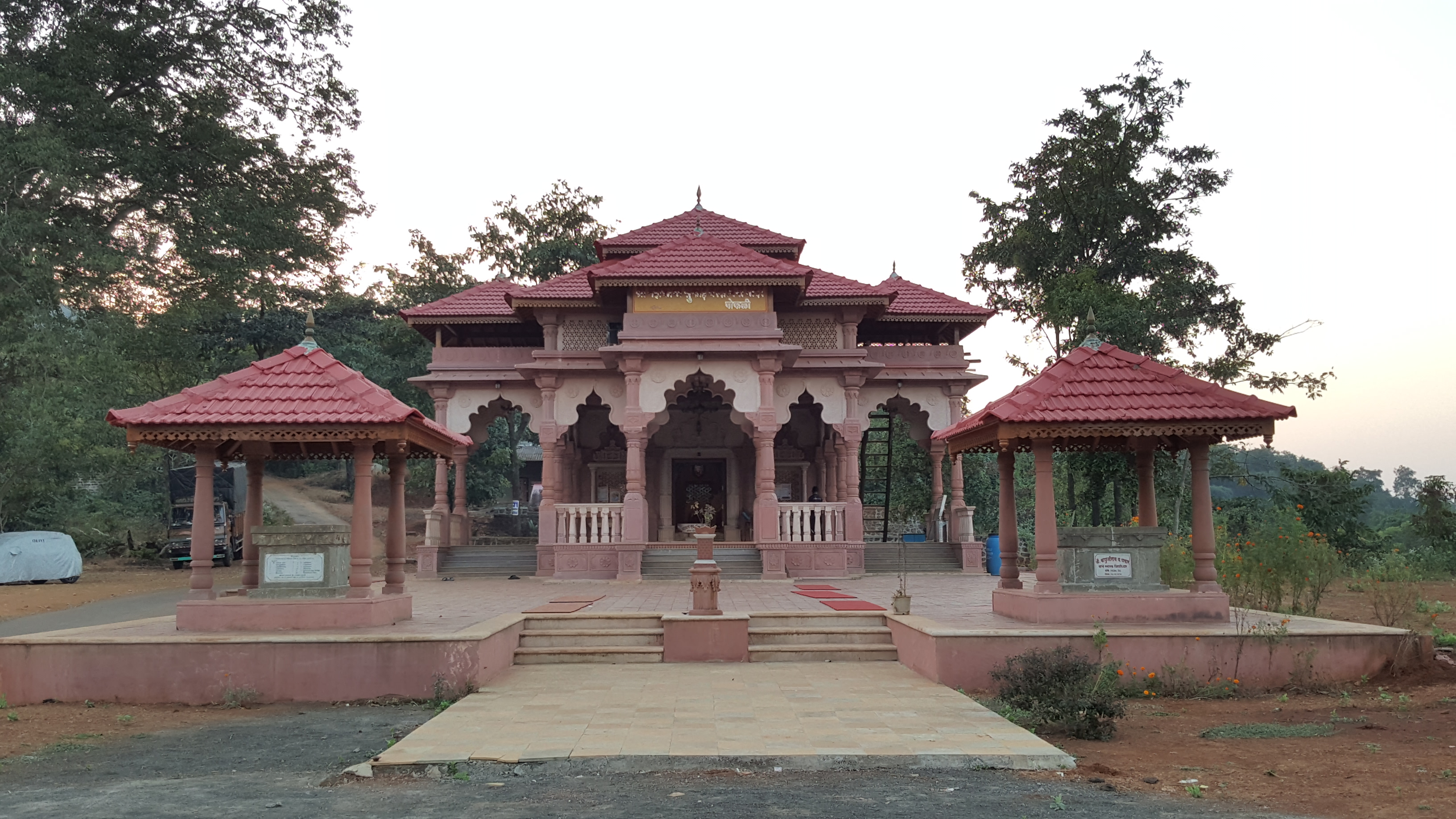
Mahakali Temple

Pophali is a panchayat town in Chiplun taluka of Ratnagiri district in Maharashtra, India. The town is known for its power plant, which is a part of the Koyna Hydroelectric Project. It is also the last town in the Konkan side on the state highway (SH-78) that links the Konkan to the rest of Maharashtra. It is at the western end of the Kumbharli Ghat on this highway. Chiplun 15 km (9 mi) is the nearest big town.
