= Alore =

Village in Maharashtra

- village
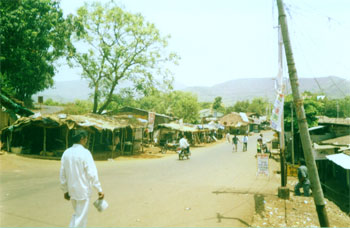

- Location in Maharashtra, India Alore (India)
- Coordinates: 17.47°N 73.62°E
- Country: India
- State: Maharashtra
- District: Ratnagiri
- Elevation: 73.2 m (240 ft)

Population (2014)
  - Total: 3,573

Languages
  - Official: Marathi
- Time zone: UTC+5:30 (IST)
- PIN: 415 603
- Telephone code: 02355
- Vehicle registration: MH-08

Alore is a village in the Chiplun taluka of Ratnagiri district, Maharashtra, India. It lies on a bypass of the state highway linking the nearest town of Chiplun to Karad, and is located about 12.0 km (7.5 miles) east of the nearest town, that is Chiplun.

Alore pin code is 415603 and postal head office is Alore.

Kolkewadi (2 km), Pedhambe (3 km), Adare (6 km), Gane (6 km), Kanhe (7 km) are the nearby villages to Alore. Alore is surrounded by Khed Taluka towards north, Patan Taluka towards east, Sangmeshwar Taluka towards south, Guhagar Taluka towards west.

Chiplun, Satara, Mahabaleswar, Karad are the nearby cities to Alore.

== Language ==
Marathi is the most common language spoken here.

== See also ==
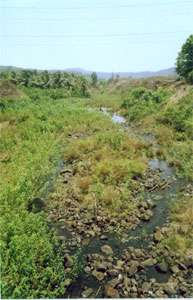
A tributary of the Vashishti River near Alore

- Konkan
- Konkan division
- Vashishti River
- Western Ghats
