= Vashishti River =

River in India

Coordinates: 17°35′N 73°10′E

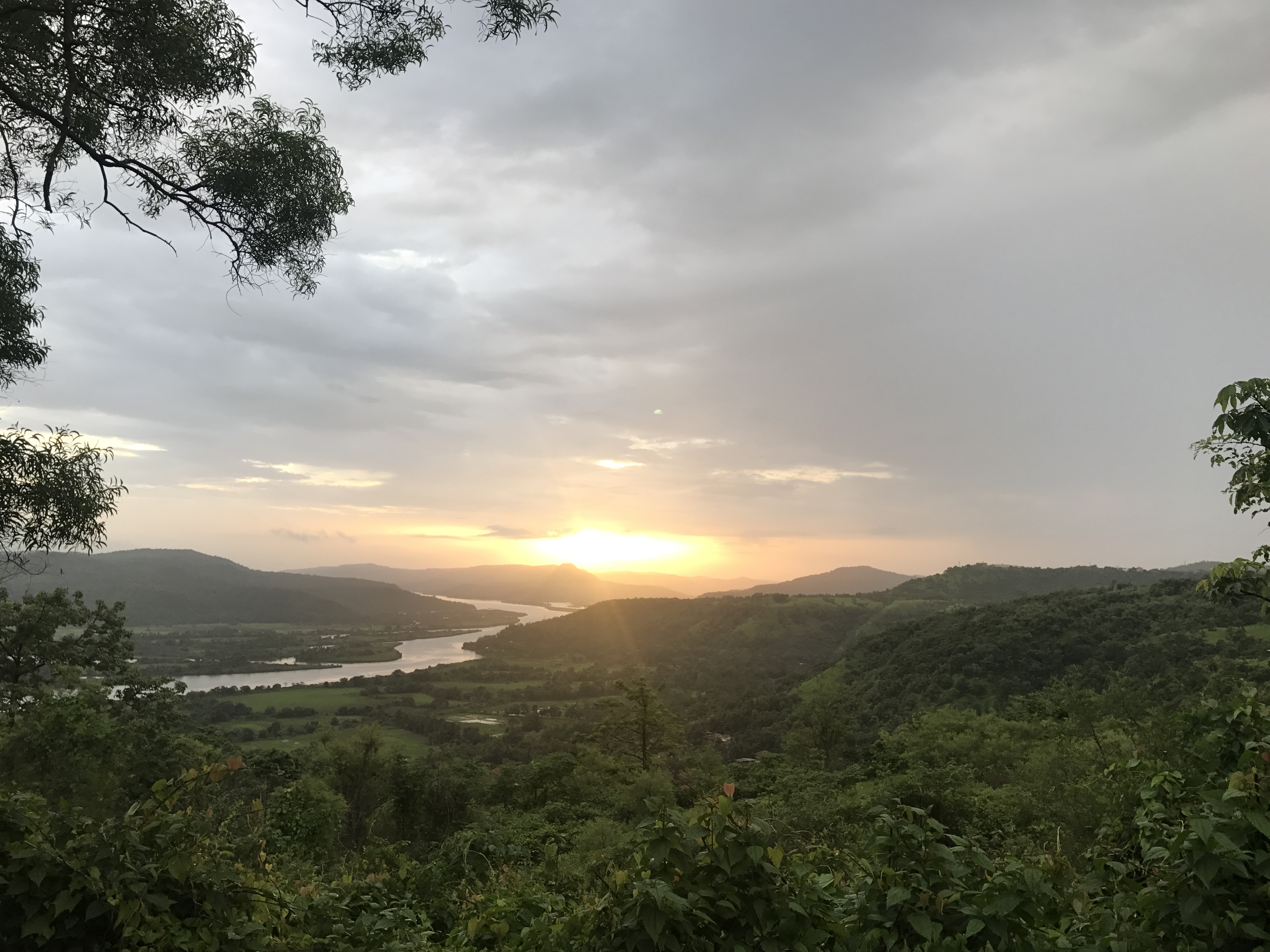
Vaishishti River in Chiplun

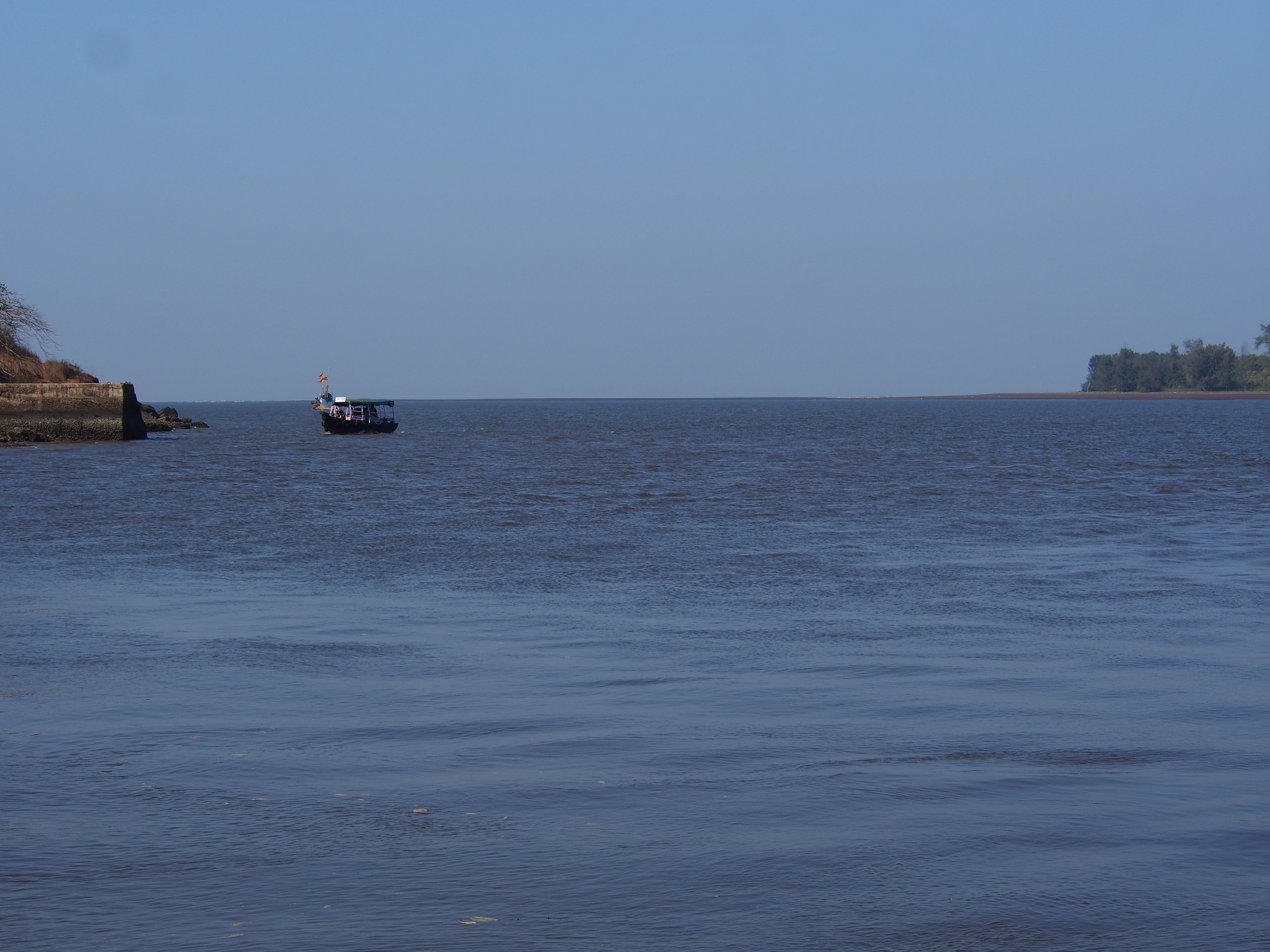
Vashishti river joins Arabian sea near Dhabol

River Vashishti is one of the larger rivers in the Konkan coast of Maharashtra, India. The river begins in the Western Ghats and snakes its way westwards towards the Arabian Sea. Kolkewadi Dam near Alore has a vast reservoir, which feeds a tributary of the river.

== History and settlements ==
The town of Chiplun lies on its banks. During the 2005 Maharashtra floods, the river swelled its banks, causing many of the city's residents to evacuate it.

== Wildlife ==
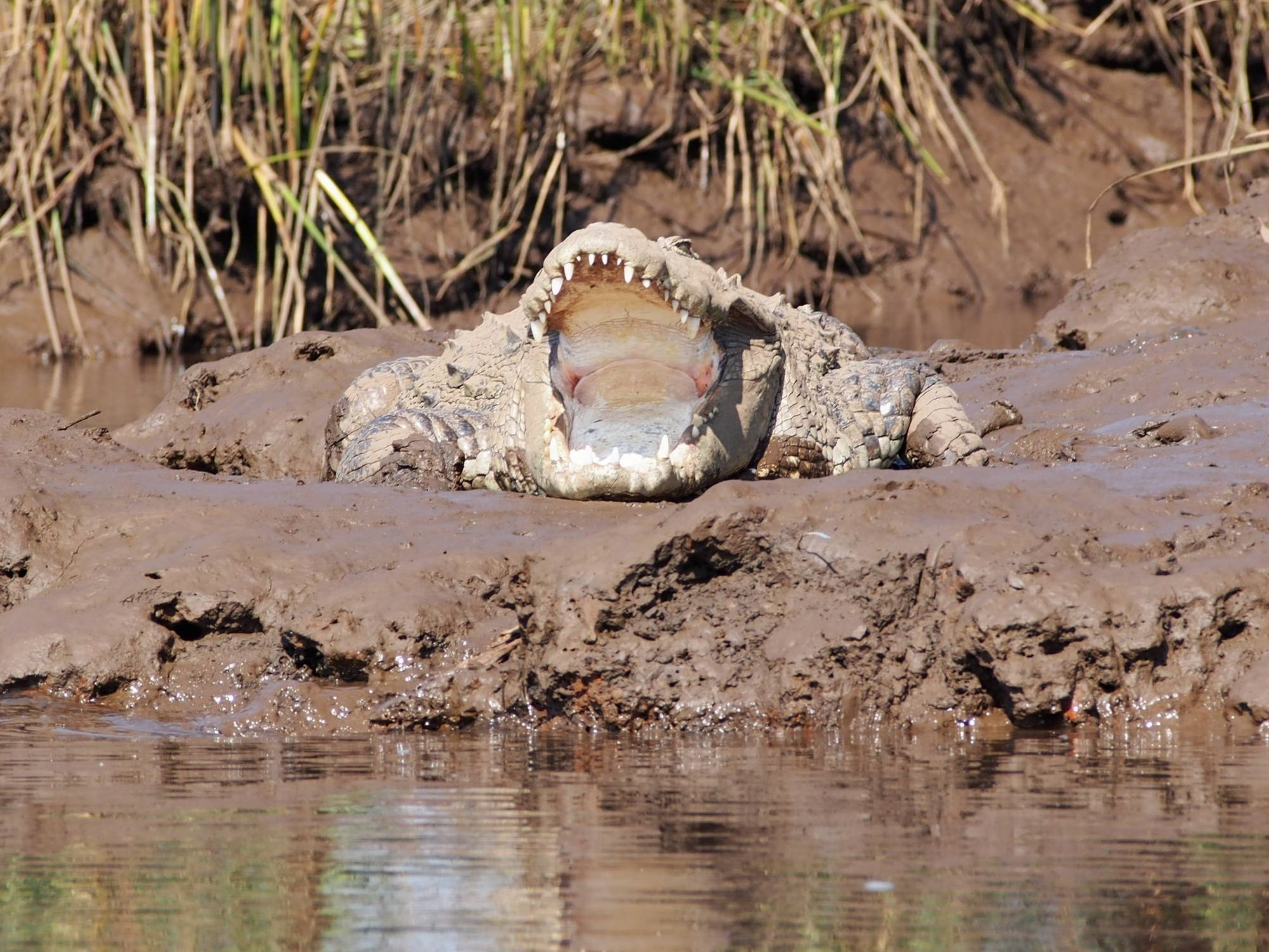
A mugger crocodile on the banks of Vashishti River

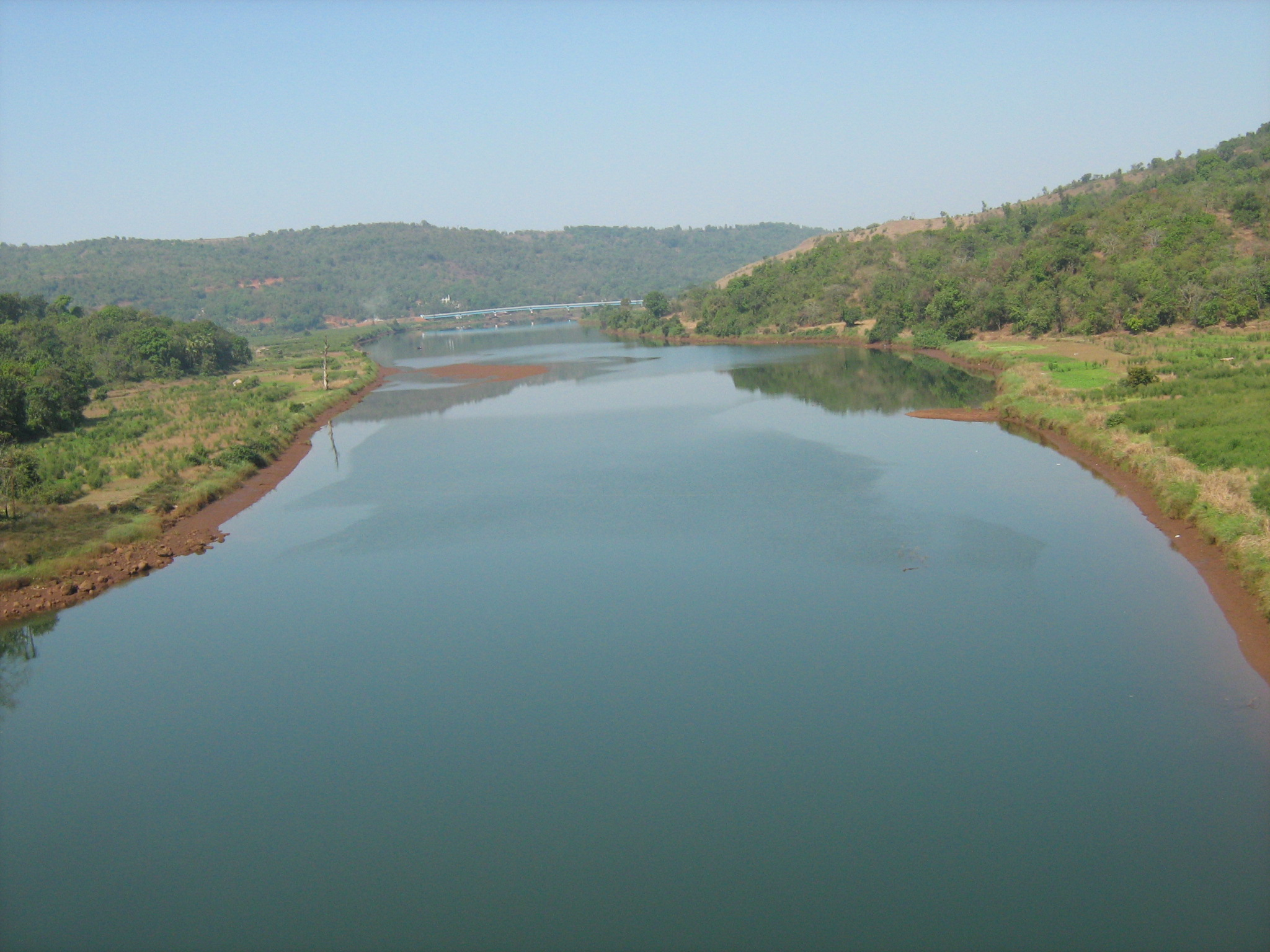
View of Vashishti River from the Konkan Railway near Chiplun

The river has many riverine islands. Mugger crocodiles are known to inhabit the waters.

== See also ==
- Jagbudi River
- Konkan Railway
- List of national waterways in India
- List of rivers of India
- Western Ghats
