= Pedhambe =

Village in Maharashtra

- village
- Location in Maharashtra, India Pedhambe (India)
- Coordinates: 17.5045°N 73.5807°E
- Country: India
- State: Maharashtra
- District: Ratnagiri
- Elevation: 23 m (75 ft)

Languages
  - Official: Marathi
- Time zone: UTC+5:30 (IST)
- PIN: 415603
- Telephone code: 02355
- Vehicle registration: MH-08

Pedhambe is a village in Chiplun taluka of Ratnagiri district in the state of Maharashtra, India. The nearest town is Chiplun, approximately 10 km (6 mi) away.
