= Kalambat =

Village in Maharashtra

- Village
- Interactive map of Kalambat
- Coordinates: 17°21′42″N 73°23′09″E
- Country: India
- State: Maharashtra

Kalambat is a small village in Ratnagiri district, Maharashtra state in Western India. The 2011 Census of India recorded a total of 499 residents in the village. Kalambat's geographical area is 549 hectares (1,360 acres).
