= Kumbharli Ghat =

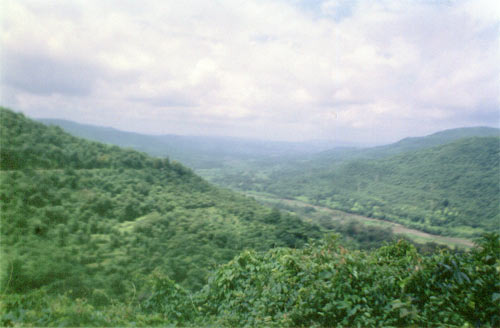
- The Pass
- Interactive map of Kumbharli Ghat
- Elevation: 625 metres (2,051 ft)
- Traversed by: Karad–Chiplun State Highway

Third Approach
- Location: Satara–Ratnagiri Districts, Maharashtra, India
- Range: Western Ghats
- Coordinates: 17.43°N 73.65°E

The Kumbharli Ghat is a mountain pass in Maharashtra, India that connects the coastal Ratnagiri District in Konkan region of Maharashtra with the Satara District in Desh region.

It cuts across the Western Ghats range. It is one of few link roads between the Konkan and Ghatmaatha in Maharashtra. The road, a state highway, is at an average elevation of 625 m (2,051 ft). It links the cities of Chiplun (Ratnagiri district) and Karad (Satara district). Near the eastern end is the Koyna Dam.

== Location ==
This ghat is on the Karad-Chiplun state highway. Also, this highway joins to the NH-4 near Karad. Malharpeth, Koyananagar, Patan and Karad are the major cities on this road.

Landslides and accidents are reported during rainy season in this region.
