= Chiplun =

- City
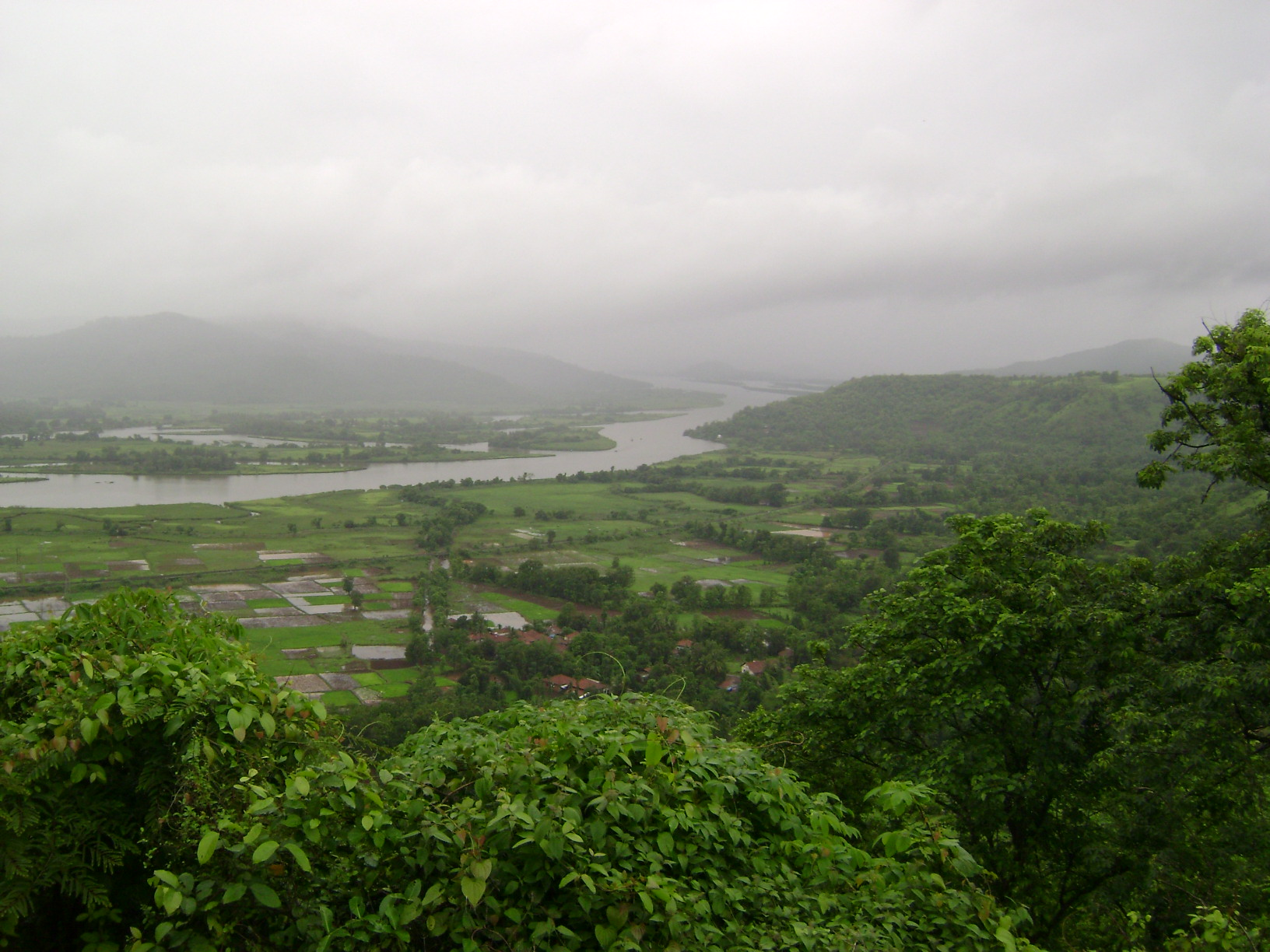
- Visava

- Location in Maharashtra, India
- Coordinates: 17.53°N 73.52°E
- Country: India
- State: Maharashtra
- District: Ratnagiri
- Established: 4000 BC

Government
  - Type: Municipal Council and Zilha Parishad
  - Body: Chiplun Nagar Parishad (urban) and Under Ratnagiri Zilha parishad in rural area

Area
  - Total: 24.73 km^{2} (9.55 sq mi)
- Elevation: 7 m (23 ft)

Population (2017)
  - Total: 50,000
  - Density: 2,000/km^{2} (5,200/sq mi)
- Demonym: Chiplunkar

Languages
  - Konkani: Marathi
- Time zone: UTC+5:30 (IST)
- PIN: 415605
- Telephone code: 02355
- Vehicle registration: MH-08
- Website: Chiplun Instagram Account

Chiplun ( [t͡ʃipɭuːɳ]) is a city in Ratnagiri district in the state of Maharashtra, India. It is one of the financial and commercial hubs of Ratnagiri district, and the headquarters of Chiplun taluka. It is about 250 km south of Mumbai and 90 km north of Ratnagiri in the Konkan region of Maharashtra, on the Mumbai–Goa highway (NH-66). It has a long history and a strong cultural background. Recent decades have seen much industrial development in it and its and surrounding areas.

== Geography ==
The city lies near the source of the Vashishti river. To the east of the city lie the Western Ghats and to the west lies Guhagar taluka, which was carved out of Chiplun taluka. The region has a tropical climate. The 'rainy season' — the monsoon lasts normally from June until October. The Koyna Hydroelectric Power Project Stages III and IV are situated near Chiplun.

== Religious significance ==
Chiplun was believed to have been the first home of the Konkanasth or Chitpavan Brahmins. According to local folklore, after claiming the Konkan region from the aggressive sea, the people were supplied with sixty ponds and sixty gardens by Parashurama, the sixth incarnation of the Hindu god Vishnu. Parashurama is believed to be the founder and creator of the Chitpavan Brahman community.

== History ==
Chiplun was initially ruled by the Satavahanas, Shakas, Kshatrapas, Kalachuris, Chalukya, and Rashtrakutas. Later it was ruled by the Kadambas and Traikutas followed by the Delhi Sultanate, Marathas and Peshwas majorly.

=== Ancient history ===
Ancient texts mention Chiplun as a port. During the rule of the Chalukya in 8th century, the place was called Chiprarulana. An inscription called Chiplun stone which has a date of 1186 CE had the names of a Shilahara king and his ministers.

=== 7th Century India ===
In the seventeenth century it was a great village, very populous and plentifully stored with all provisions. The nearby Gowalkot was the trade center being the major harbour over Vashishthi River. The Paag area in town was named so because it was mainly used for war horse stables. The central area in Chiplun, called Markandi, is believed to have taken name from the Yadnya performed there by Maharshi Markandeya.

=== Maratha Empire ===
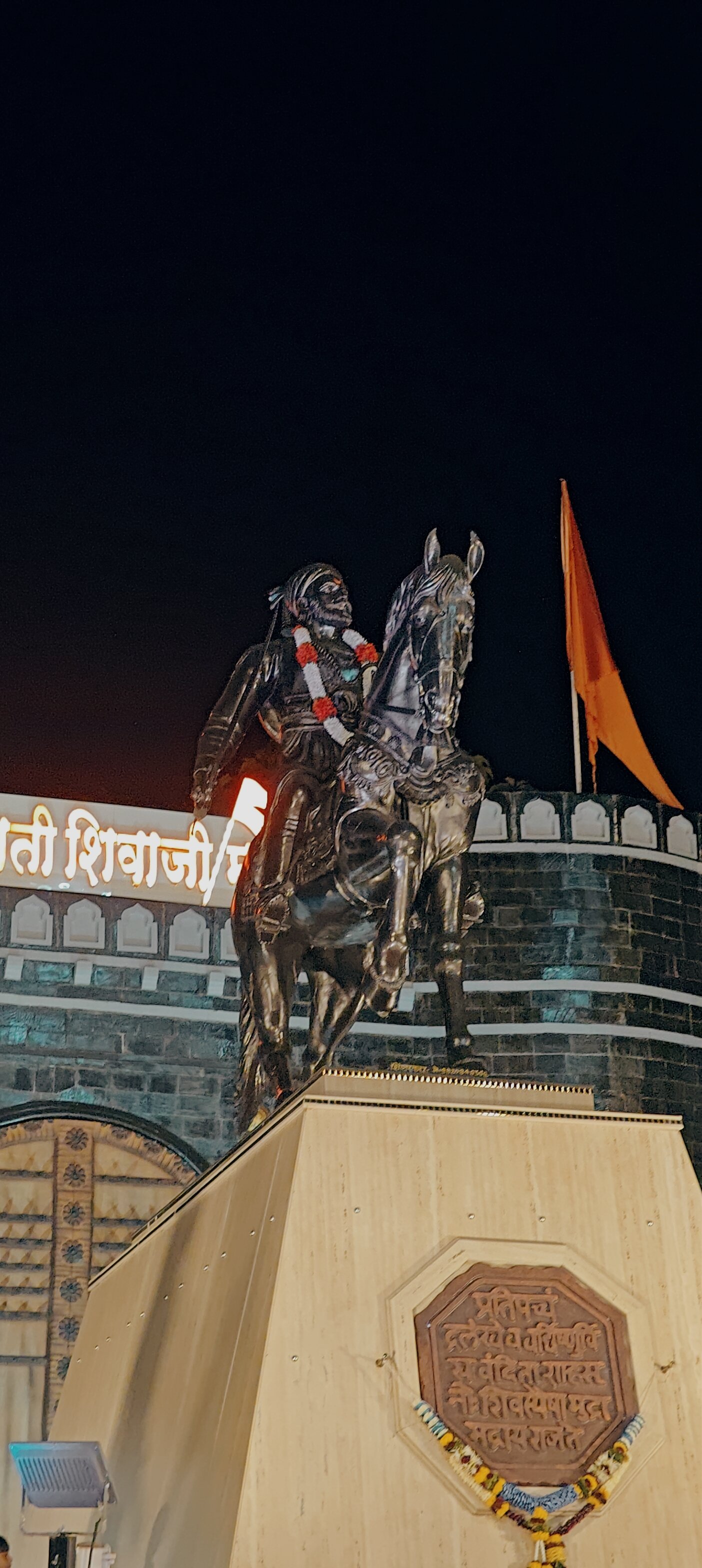
Chhatrapati Shivaji Maharaj Statue

In recent history, when Chatrapati Shivaji took over Konkan and established his reign, he won the Gowalkot fort in 1660 and renamed it as Govindagad. During the times of the Maratha Empire Chiplun was halting place when travelling towards upper ghat regions of Satara. Chhatrapati Shivaji came to Gowalkoat fort in Chiplun to take an update of his Arm forces before going for his coronation at Raigad.

Chiplun was taken over later by means of fort battles including Sambhaji Maharaj, Tulaji Angre, Chimaji Appa, and Siddi Sat, before being taken up by a body of Ramoshis in 1818, but abandoned on the approach of British forces.

During this time Peshwa Bajirao II, who for some years (1812-1815) came down the Kumbharli pass to visit his palace at Guhagar near Dabhol, built a rest house for himself which is now used as a Government office.

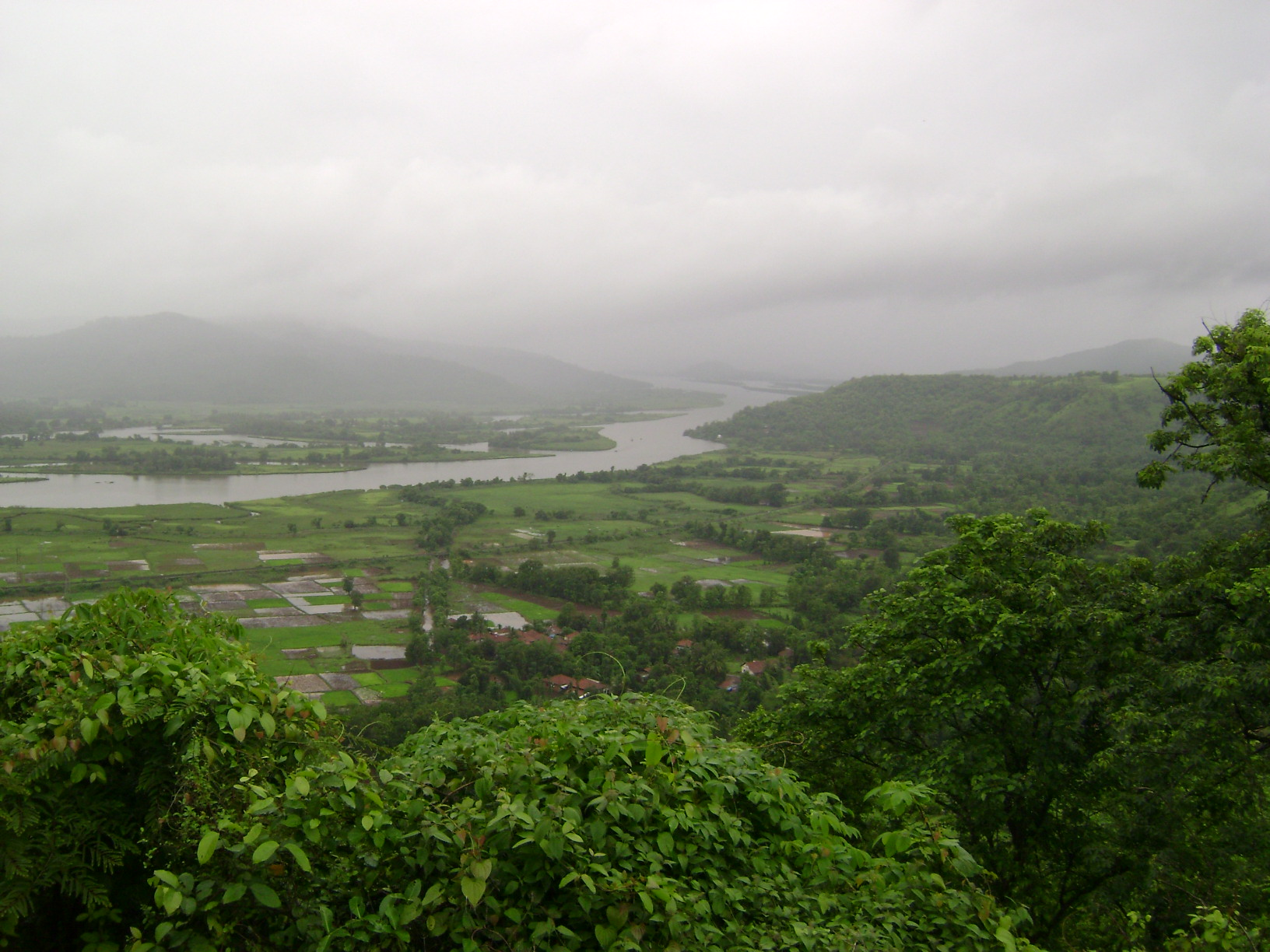
Chiplun scenery from Parashurama Ghat

=== British colonial rule ===
The British colonial rule (1818-1947) saw large seasonal or permanent migration of people to the emerging Industrial city of Mumbai from Chiplun and other areas of Northern Konkan.

== Demographics ==
At the 2011 India census, Chiplun had a population of 55,139 of which 27,355 are males while 27,784 are females as per the report released by Census India 2011. Literacy rate of Chiplun city is 93.92%, higher than the state average of 82.34%. In Chiplun, male literacy is around 96.50%, while female literacy is at 91.42%.

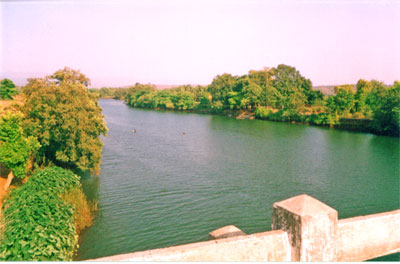
Chiplun is situated on the banks of the Vashisti River.

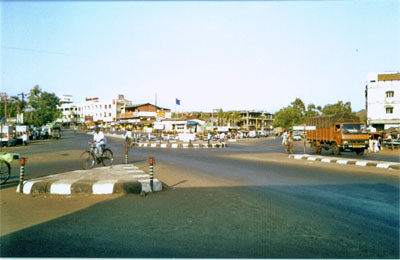
Bahadursheikh Naka in Chiplun

== Attractions ==
=== The Lokamanya Tilak Smarak Vachan Mandir library and Museum ===
The 155-year-old library in Chiplun called Lokmanya Tilak Smarak Vachan Mandir with a large collection of rare books added a museum in November 2018 to display its collection of ancient artifacts. This includes Stone Age tools, artifacts from Harappan culture, pottery of ancient Jorwe and Malwa cultures from Inamgaon excavation near Pune, articles from Maratha Empire era and ancient statues of many gods and goddess discovered in the area. The museum also has a collection of coins ranging from Roman era to that of Maratha states.

=== Akkalkot Swami Math ===
This Hindu hermitage or Math dedicated to Shri Swami Samartha was established by Shri Gopalbuva Kelkar alias Shri Preetinand Swamikumar Maharaj who authored a book about miracles done by Shri Swami Samartha. The Math showcases Swami Samartha's silver slippers and wooden dand (meditation arm-rest).

=== Parashurama Temple ===
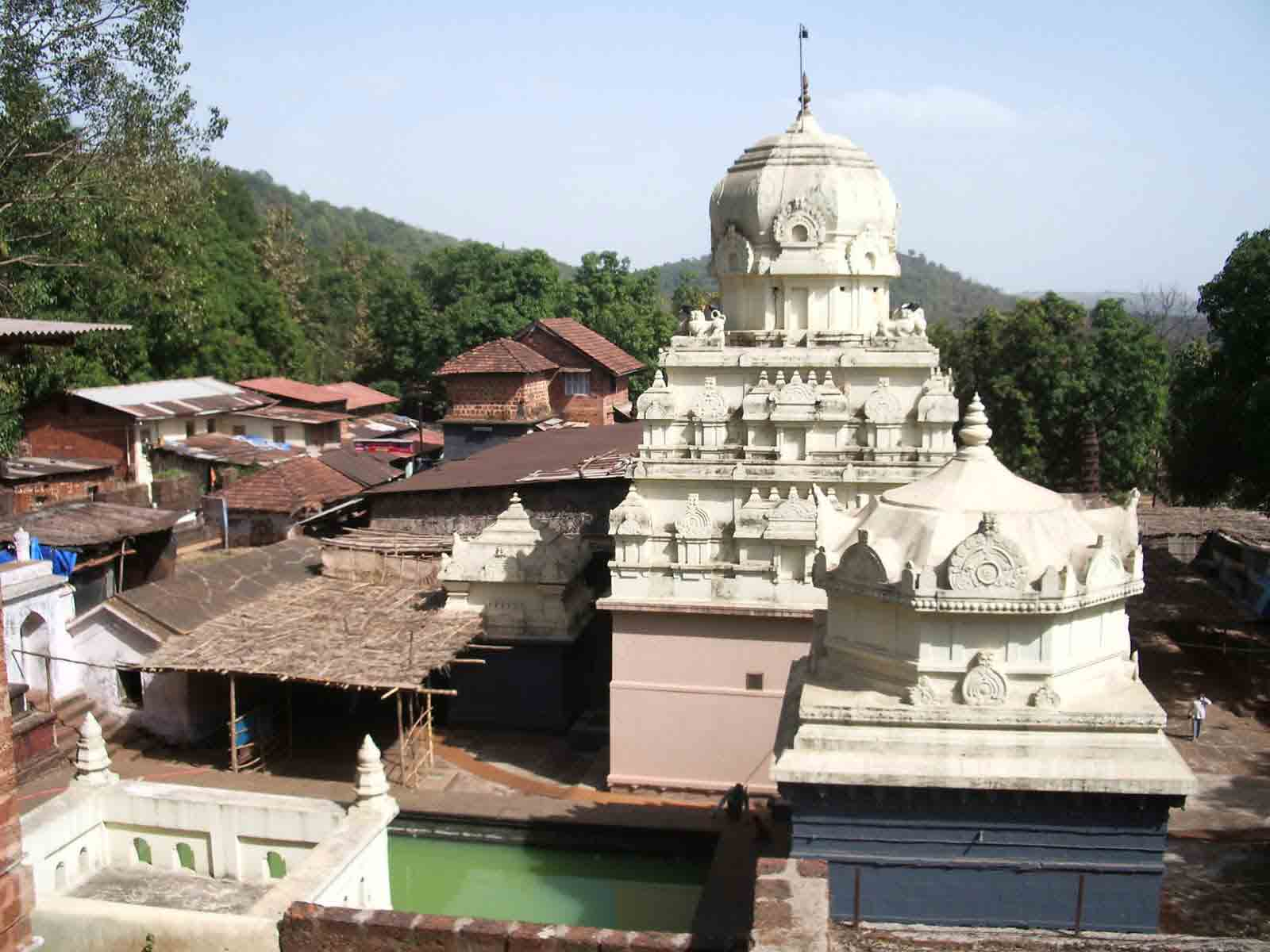

This is one of the few temples that exist dedicated to the Hindu deity Parashurama. It dates back to 1700 CE when it was built by Siddi Rasul Yakut Khan through the initiative from Swami Paramhans Brahmendra. This devotional place consists of a central shrine surrounded by two smaller buildings. The main temple has an idol of Parashurama in the centre, Brahma at the right, and Shiva on the left. The structure of the temple is influenced by Hindu, Muslim, and European architecture. The Banganga Talav is believed to be made by Parashurama by arching five arrows to the ground.

=== Shree Kulswamini Bhawani Waghjai Mandir ===
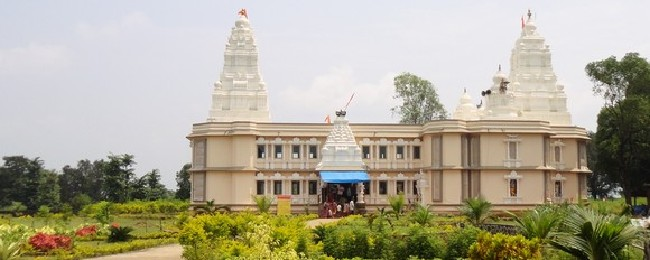

This newly renovated temple, which dates back to 1860, has been identified as a Government of Maharashtra's official tourist spot. The temple houses idols of four goddesses viz. Bhawani, Waghjai, Kalkai and Navdurga along with Lord Shiv Shankar. the temple also has Navdurga, nine forms taken by Goddess Parvati. The temple is surrounded by seven gardens.The temple is 800 feet above sea level and it is a plateau Terav village is a flat land at 800 feet, due to which this village has a unique beauty of its own.

=== Walavalkar Chhatrapati Shivaji Maharaj Museum ===
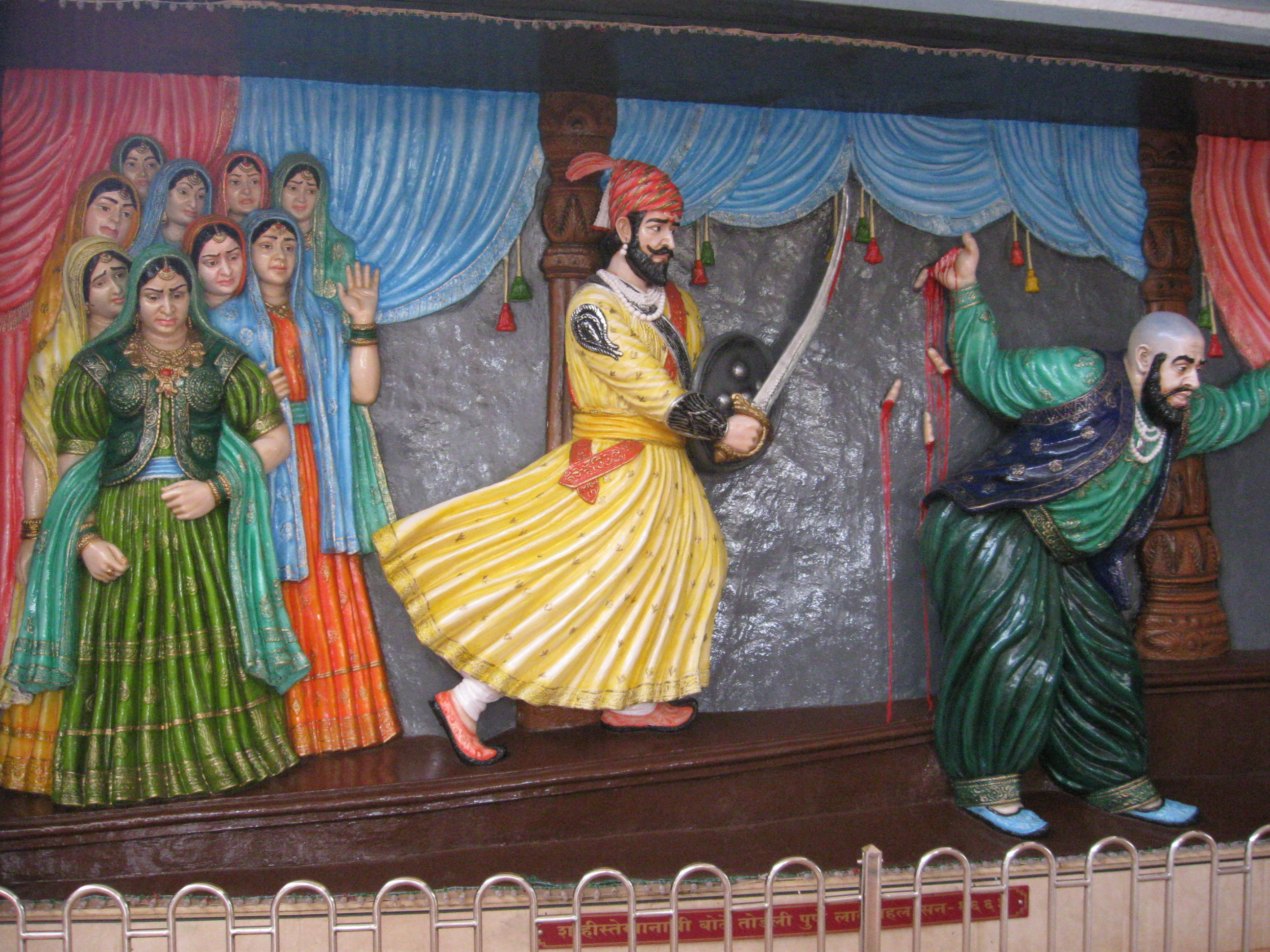
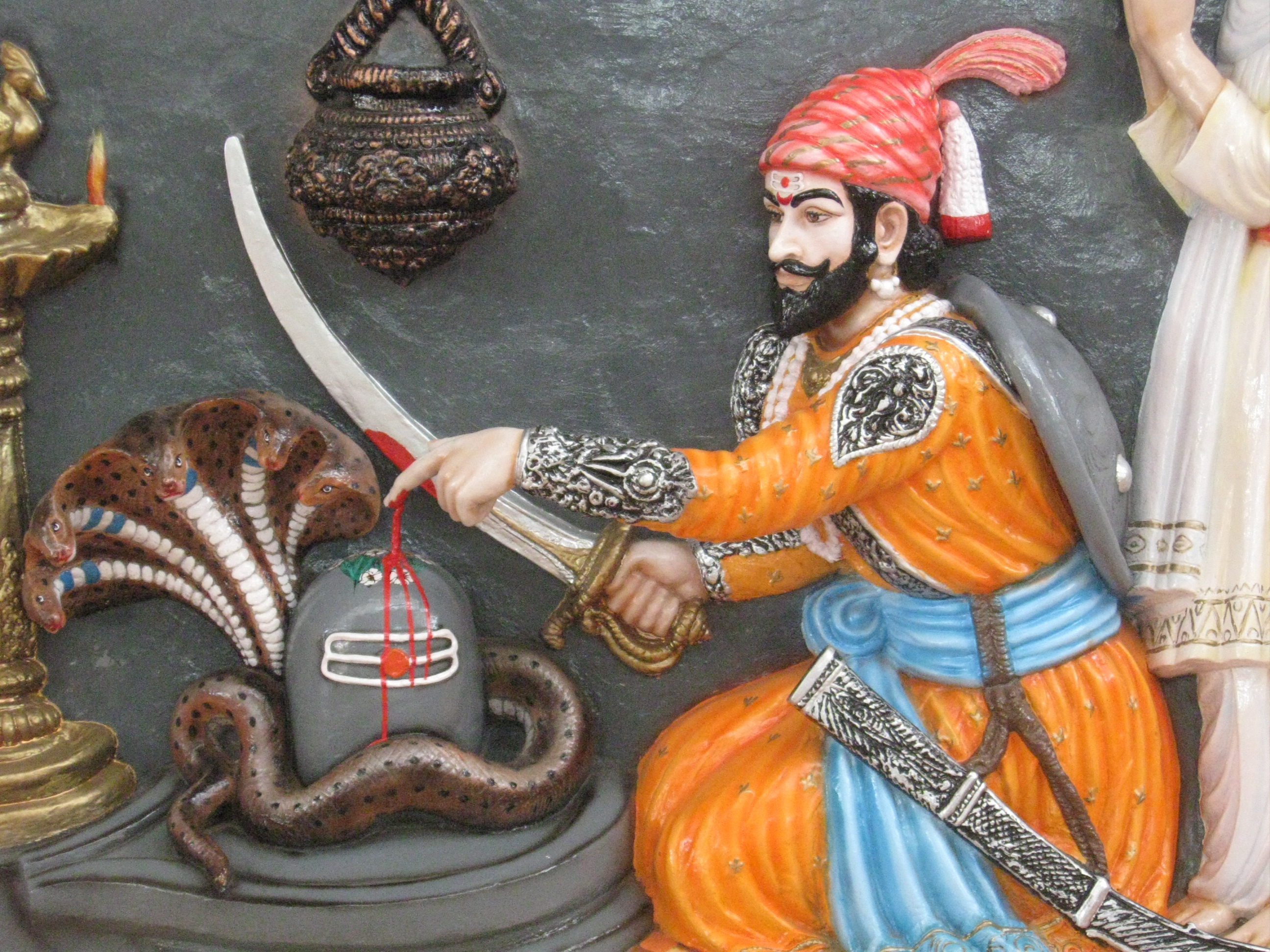

The Walavalkar Chhatrapati Shivaji Maharaj museum or Shivsrushti or Shiv-Samarth Mandir built by Shree sant Sitarambuva Walwalkar trust located at Dervan is one of the must-see locations when in Chiplun. The entire life history of Maratha king Shivaji is etched through sculptures and life sized statues with in detail expressions of characters including animals. The whole museum is formed as if a fort which brings the glory of Shivaji-era. In the temple premises, along with Shivaji, Sant Ramdas, Sant Tukaram and Sant Namdev are seen standing in their life-size forms. Bal Shivaji's naming Ceremony, his oath with his companions-at Rohideshwar as a child; he praying before the goddess Jagadamba, an encounter with Afzal khan, Baji Prabhu Deshpande's sacrifice, the coronation Ceremony; the re-acceptance of Netaji Palkar to the Hinduism, fight with Shahistekhan to name a few.

=== Shree Chandikai Kalkai Temple, Waghivare ===
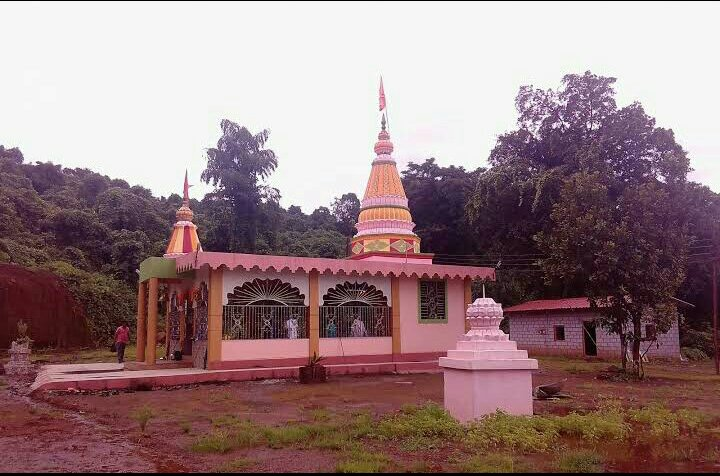
Shree Chandikai Kalkai Temple, Waghivare

Shree Chandikai Kalkai is local deity of village Waghivare. This is a Hindu temple situated in a jungle on the border of Villages Waghivare and Vadad. Devotees believe that goddess is protecting them being on the border. Though the temple is dedicated to goddess Shree Chandikai Kalkai, there are idols of god Khem (खेम), Kedar (केदार), Som (सोम) and goddess Waghambari (वाघांबरी), Vardhan (वर्धान), Manai (मानाई) also in the temple.

Many devotees come here on Monday, Day of Goddess, for discussing problems and getting solutions from their mother, Shree Chandikai Kalkai Devi.

=== Shree Hitvardhak Ganesh Temple, Madhaliwadi, Waghivare ===
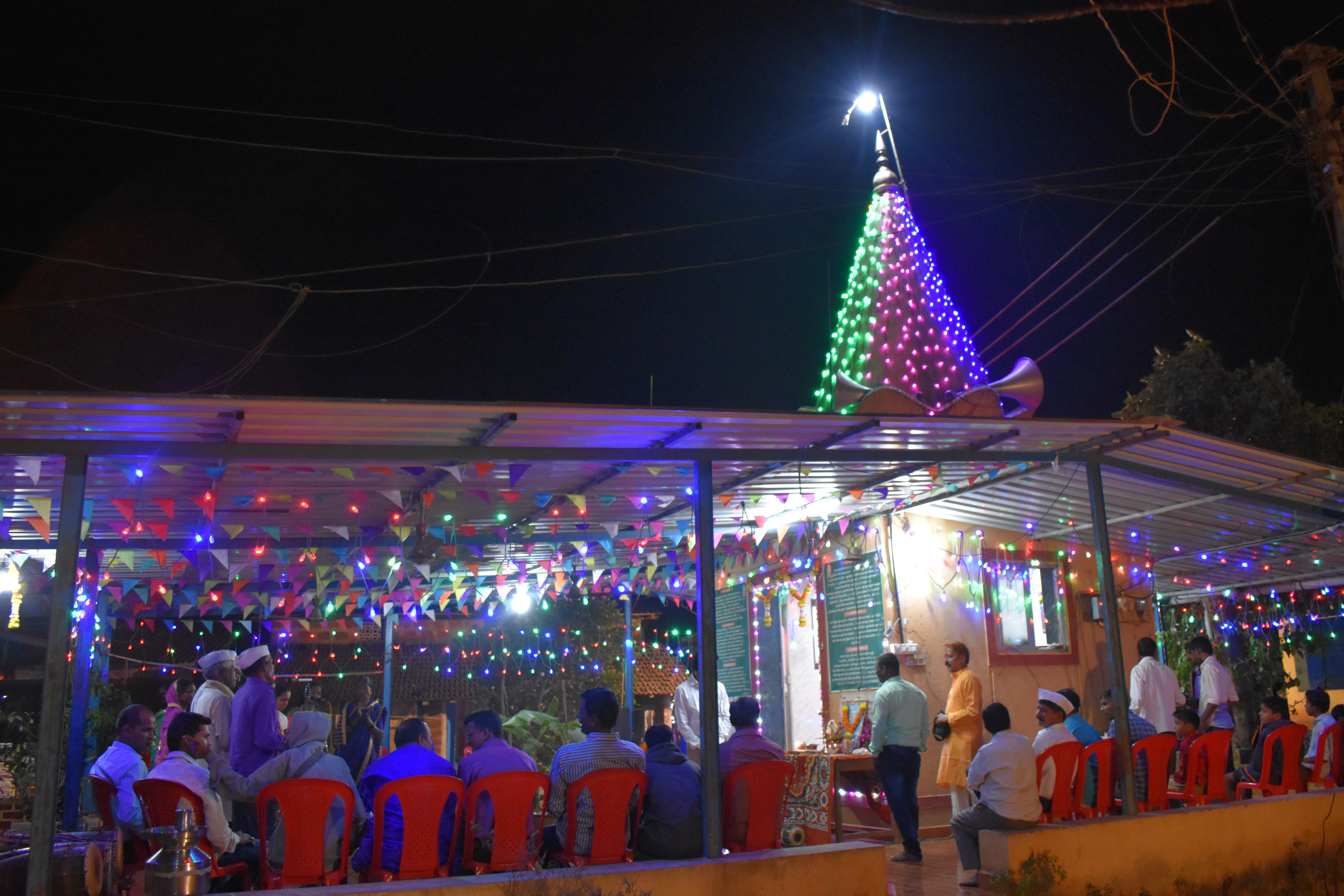
Shree Hitvardhak Ganesh Temple, Waghivare.

== Transportation ==
=== Road ===
Chiplun is connected to other parts of the country mainly by National Highway 66 (NH-66). Chiplun is connected by road to Mumbai, Pune, Thane, Ratnagiri, Mangalore, Karwar, Udupi and Cochin by National Highway Number 66 (NH-66). The Konkan Railway also connects to these places by train along with Delhi, Ernakulam and Jaipur.

Roads in Chiplun city as well as in many villages is at par above average compared to road conditions in Mumbai. It is also connected to Koynanagar, Patan, and Karad by SH 78. There are several district roads which connect villages to district headquarters and Chiplun town.

There are two MSRTC bus stations. One is the main bus station frequently called "Khalcha" (juna) bus stand, and the other is just 2 km ahead of Main bus station called Shivaji Nagar Bus Stand.

Although there are lots of MSRTC intercity bus services, there are few private tourists buses such as Ghatge Patil, Sairatna, Ashwini etc. bus services which ply from Ratnagiri towards Mumbai and Pune.

=== Railways ===
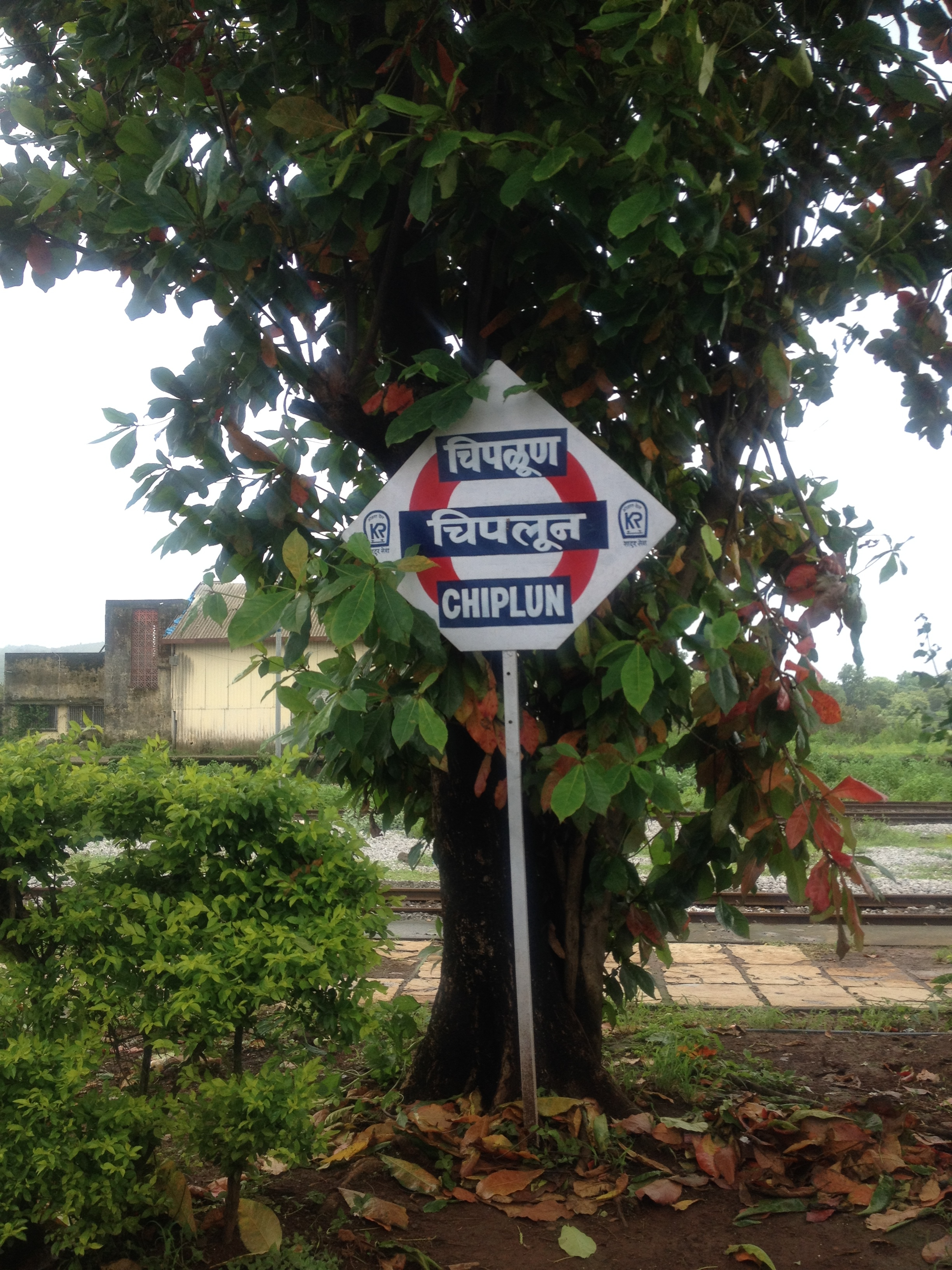
Chiplun Railway Station signboard.

Chiplun railway station is one of the most important stations on the Konkan Railway. The nearest railway junctions are Panvel, Pune and Kolhapur on the central railway. The Chiplun railway station is situated at a distance of 4 km from Chiplun city on NH-17. Nearly every train running on Konkan Railway stops at Chiplun Station.

Chiplun (CHI)
Next 'small' station towards Mumbai: Anjani	Konkan Railway : Railway (India)	Next 'small' station from Mumbai: Kamathe
Next 'small' station towards Mumbai: Anjani	Distance from Mumbai (CST) = 292 km	Next 'small' station from Mumbai: Kamathe
Next 'main' station towards Mumbai: Khed	Konkan Railway: Railway (India)	Next 'main' station from Mumbai: Ratnagiri

== See also ==
- Pedhambe
- Pophali
- Ratnagiri
- Guhagar
- Kalambat
- Chiplun taluka
