= Jawji Gawli =

Jawji Babaji Gawli (Marathi: जावजी बाबाजी गवळी) was also referred to as Jauji Gauli (Marathi: जाउजी गवळी) or Javji Gauli (Marathi: जावजी गवळी) or Jivaji Gauli (Marathi: जिवाजी गवळी) was a Sardar (Chieftain) in the Peshwa's army during the reign of Balaji Baji Rao.

== Family background ==
Born to Babaji Gawli, he had a brother named Maloji. He was a resident of Khare Patan, a village in the Sindhudurg district of Konkan, Western Maharashtra.

== Historical role ==
Jawji Gawli's major historical role was during the Anglo-Maratha-Angre wars of 1755 and 1756. He fought in the Battle of Suvarnadurg Kharepatan and Vijaydurg.

This period was during the reign of Peshwa Balaji Baji Rao, popularly known as Nanasaheb Peshwa. The relations between Peshwas and Angres were not the best. Tulaji Angre was a source of worry for the English, Portuguese and also the Peshwas. Tulaji was ambitious and capable and did not wish to be subordinate to the Peshwa. He plundered the ships of the English, Portuguese and began to levy contributions from the Peshwa's own territories.

The Peshwas took the help of English to wage a war upon Tulaji Angre who was one of the sons of Kanhoji Angre. Peshwas and English jointly attacked Suvarnadurg. The joint siege of the fort lasted from 25 March to 2 April 1755. On 12 April 1755, Sir William James, 1st Baronet captured the fort and formally handed it over to the Peshwas.

== Role in key battles ==
=== Battle of Kharepatan (1755) ===
In December 1755, during the Peshwa's offensive to consolidate power in the Konkan, Jawji Gawli led a decisive engagement at Kharepatan. When Tulaji Angre's trusted commander, Rudraji Dhulap, arrived with reinforcements, Jawji and Anandrao Warge led a charge of cavalry and "horse-musketeers." In the ensuing battle, Jawji's forces successfully wounded and captured Rudraji Dhulap and a Portuguese chief, effectively breaking the land-based resistance of the Angre forces.

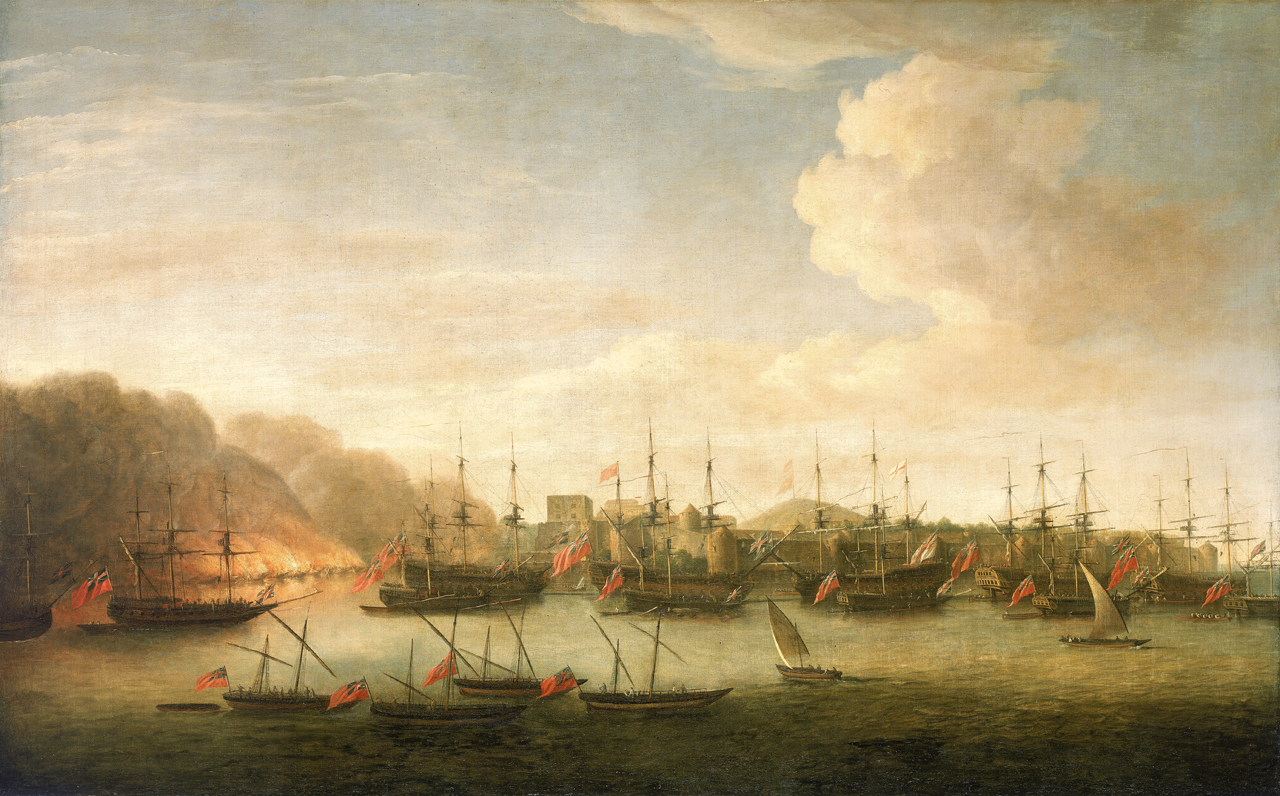
The Capture of Geriah, February 1756

Jawji Gawli fought along with Khandoji Mankar on behalf of the Peshwas. He represented the Peshwas during negotiations and was associated with the Konkan Governor of Peshwa – Ramji Mahadev Biwalkar. He negotiated with Tulaji Angre prior to the commencement of the English-Peshwa attack on Vijaydurg fort. His significant historical role has been provided in great details in the book 'Peshwaiche Divya Tej' authored by Vithal Waman Hadap published in 1940.

== Letters from Nanasaheb Peshwa ==
The famous historical archives in Pune – Peshwa Daftar – Part 24 has letters which provide references

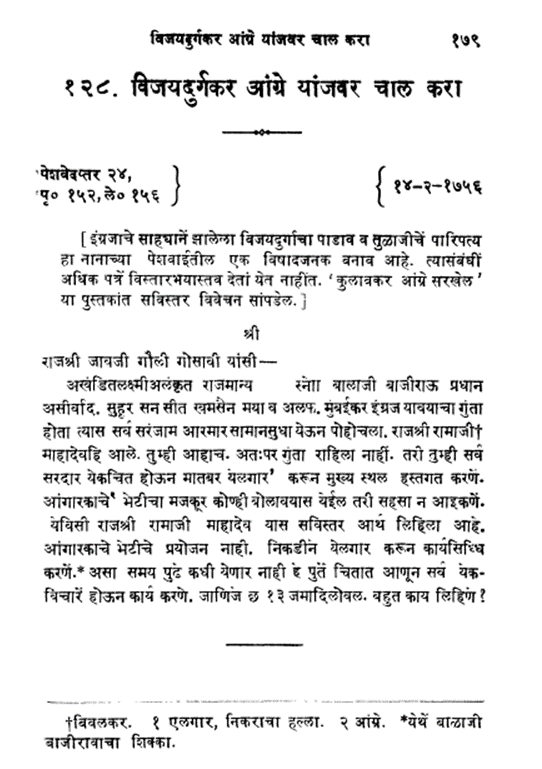
Peshwa's Letter To Jawji Gawli #156

a. Letter no 142 – Jawji Gawli Kharepatankar

b. Letter no 152/153 – Maloji Gawli

c. Letter no 156 – Letter from Peshwas to Jawji Gawli

== Other letters which mention Jawji Gawli ==
In addition to above mentioned letters, Peshwa Daftar Part 24 lists additional letter where Jawji Gawli has been mentioned in G S Sardesai's book - Indexes To The Selections From The Peshwas' Daftar

Page no 121, lists letter numbers 44, 111, 120, 121, 131, 137, 138, 139, 141, battle of Kharepatan 142, 143, 144, 146, 148, 150, 151, 154, 155, 156, 163, 164, 175, invited to meet Tulaji Angria 177, 178, 179.

== Significance of Battle of Vijaydurg (Gheriah) ==
Vijaydurg Fort was called the "Eastern Gibraltar", as it was virtually impregnable. The British failed to take this fort from 1718 till 1756. The taking of Vijaydurg was amongst the most significant battles and a defining moment in Maratha Naval history. The Angres held sway from Surat in the north to Konkan in the south severely affecting British trade interests. The British-Peshwa joint victory over Tulaji Angre therefore paved the way for unhindered access for British ships on India's western coast, which was hitherto denied by the Angres. A different outcome of this battle could have changed the course of British rule in India or at least postponed it. An author cited has said that the Battle of Vijaydurg (1756) was perhaps the maritime equivalent of the Battle of Plassey (1757).

Historical archives in the Peshwa Daftar (Part 24) contain significant correspondence regarding his role:

- Diplomatic Intermediary: In January 1756, Tulaji Angre attempted to negotiate a truce specifically through Jawji Gawli, proposing a meeting at the village of Anasure to mend relations with the Peshwa.
- Command of Nana Saheb: Despite the ongoing negotiations, Nanasaheb Peshwa issued strict orders (Letter No. 156) to Jawji to cease all talks and launch an immediate assault on the fort.

== Migration of descendants ==
The descendants of Jawji Gawli and Mahuji Gawli later migrated to Northern Maharashtra, first to Ahergaon and subsequently settled in Chalisgaon in Jalgaon district. The descendents acquired land and came to be known as Patil.

This history of the family has been documented by late Shri Valsing Ishram Patil through an autobiography written in April 1958.
