= Tulaji Angre =

Maratha admiral

Tulaji Angre Sarkhel
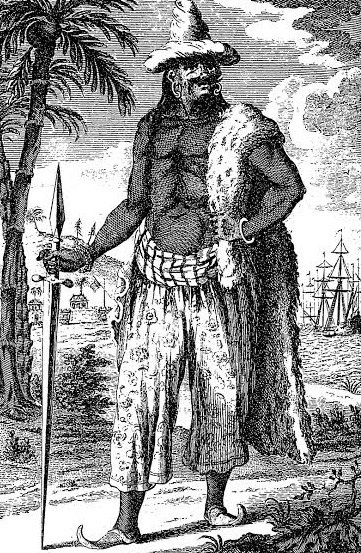
- Sketch of Tulaji Angre
- Born: Colaba, Colaba State, Maratha Confederacy (modern day Alibag, Maharashtra, India)
- Died: 1786; Solapur, Maratha Confederacy
- Relatives: Kanhoji Angre (father); Lakshmibai Jagtap (mother); Manaji Angre (brother); Sekhoji Angre (half-brother); Sambhaji Angre (half-brother); Dhondji Angre (half-brother); Yesaji Angre(half-brother)
- Military career
- Allegiance: Maratha Confederacy: Colaba State
- Service: Maratha Navy
- Service years: 1743–1754
- Rank: Sarkhel (Admiral)
- Unit: Colaba's fleet
- Commands: Ruler of Colaba State; Grand Admiral of Maratha Navy
- Conflicts: Battle of Vijaydurg

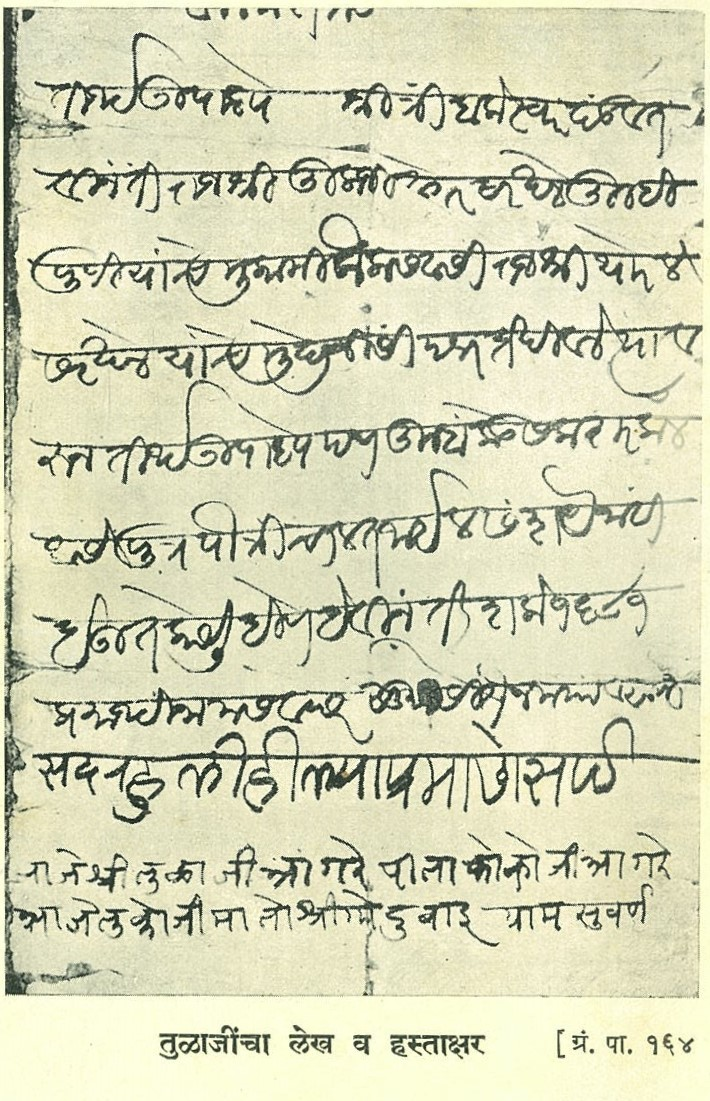
Handwriting of Tulaji Angre

Tulaji Angre, called Tulajee Angria by English historians was the grand admiral of the Maratha Navy and ruler of Colaba State in modern-day India. Similar to his famous father Kanhoji Angre, he too was an extremely skilled admiral and attacked several European trading ships. His achievements and naval prowess are considered to be greater than that of his father by some scholars and chroniclers. On various occasions he fought against the English, Dutch, Siddis And Portuguese maritime Powers. However, he alienated himself from the Maratha Peshwa, Balaji Baji Rao which led to his capture by the East India Company and Peshwa's forces at the Battle of Vijaydurg in 1756.

== Early life ==
Tulaji Angre was born to Kanhoji Angre by his second wife Lakshmibai of the Jagtap family. Manaji was his sibling, Sekhoji and Sambhaji, the elder sons of Kanhoji from Rajubai of Mahadik family and junior sons- Dhondji, and Yesaji from Gahinabai of the Bhonsle family, were his half brothers.

== Career ==
In 1713, the Suvarnadurg fort, which had once been under the command of Kanhoji Angre, was formally handed over to Tulaji by Shahu I and became a major base for piracy by the Angre family in the coming years. Tulaji and his brother Manaji started competing for the post of sarkhel (admiral) of the Maratha Navy. Manajai was supported by the Peshwa (prime minister) Balaji Baji Rao while the former was supported by the Maratha monarch Shahu I. This created two spheres of influence, Manaji in the north at Colaba and Tulaji in the south at Vijaydurg.

Tulaji's elder step-brother Sambhaji Angre died in 1742. In 1743, Tulaji succeeded his brother Sambhaji Angre as sarkhel of the Maratha Navy through the support of the Maratha monarch Shahu I, who recognized Tulaji's talent and skill at seafaring. In addition, Tulaji also became ruler of the Colaba State.

In 1749, Tulaji attacked Commodore James' fleet, and after a fierce battle he retreated to Gheria. Next year, in spite of his defeat, Tulaji attacked Commodore Lisle in command of a fleet of several ships, including HMS Vigilant, 64 guns, and HMS Ruby, 50 guns. Again, in February 1754, he attacked three Dutch ships of fifty, thirty-six, and eighteen guns, burnt the two large ones, and took the third. The power of Tulajii Angre was so great that it cost the East India Company Rs. 5,00000 a year to protect their trade.

By 1749, Tulaji had become so powerful that his ships navigated the coast from Cutch to Cochin fearlessly, without any power including the East India Company hindering their journey, considered even bolder than what his father Kanhoji had achieved. In a brief span, he had surpassed the record of his predecessors in the number of English ships captured: Charlotte of Madras, William of Bombay, Svern of Bengal, Darby, Restoration, Pilot, Augusta and Dadabhoi of Surat. He had also captured Anjanvel and Gowalkot fort from the Siddis of Janjira in 1745. Tulaji refused to admit the Peshwa Balaji Baji Rao as his superior, maintaining that both were equal servants of the Chhatrapati. He refused to pay revenue contribution and even annoyed the Peshwa by raiding his territory. Nanasaheb could not afford to counterattack as long as Tulaji's benefactor Shahu I was alive, but after the latter's death in 1749, the Peshwa was free to wreck his vengeance on him.

=== Fall ===
In 1753, the Peshwa (prime minister), Balaji Baji Rao was reported to have stated he would not tolerate Tulaji any longer. This statement was probably made due to the successes and influence of Tulaji on the sea. Moreover, the Peshwa and Tulaji Angre had never been on good terms due to the former supporting Manaji Angre, Tulaji's rival.

Around 1754, Tulaji stopped paying his annual tribute to the Maratha state and according to a British chronicler, he "slit the noses" of the Maratha ambassadors who came to collect tribute and sent them back empty handed. The Peshwa had requested the East India Company on several occasions to join hands and crush Tulaji to serve their mutual interests. In 1755, the EIC joined hands with Balaji Baji Rao and in early 1756, British forces captured Suvarnadurg while the Peshwa captured the other land and coastal Angre forts such as Gowalkot. In a short span, Tulajii was only left with Vijaydurg, which was attacked by a large force under Admiral Watson and fell.

== Imprisonment and death ==
Vijaydurg fell and Tulaji, meanwhile had left the fort and gone to the Peshwa's camp seeking a negotiation but was promptly arrested and sent to one of the inland forts as a prisoner. Rudraji Dhulap succeeded him as Grand admiral of the Maratha Navy. Tulaji Angre was first imprisoned in a prison cell of the Peshwa's hill-fort near Raigad, being moved from one cell to another due to the Peshwa's fear that he might escape. Subsequently, he was moved to Vandan Fort near Satara and then Solapur, where he died in 1786.

== Battles ==
The list of Tulaji Angre's battles and campaigns is as follows-

- Gowalkot Fort (1744)
- Anjanvel Fort captured From Siddis Of Janjira (December 1744)
- Capture Of Charlotte Of Madras
- Capture Of William Of Bombay
- Capture Of Svern Of Bengal
- Capture Of Darby
- Capture Of Restoration
- Capture Of Pilote
- Capture Of Augusta
- Capture Of Dadabhoi Of Surat
- Attacks on Mangalore (January, 1747-November, 1749)
- Capture Of Honnavar Fort (March, 1750)
- Battle of Vijaydurg (1756)

== Legacy ==
Tulaji Angre was one of the last competent leaders of the Maratha Navy. With most of the Angre family's power gone, the maritime advances of the East India Company were left unchecked and the Maratha navy rapidly declined.
