= Dhulap family =

Maratha family that were commanders of the Maratha navy

- Country: Maratha Empire
- Founder: Rudraji Dhulap
- Titles: Sarekhel
- Members: Rudraji Dhulap, Anandrao Dhulap, Janrao Dhulap, Krishnaji Dhulap, Janoji Dhulap

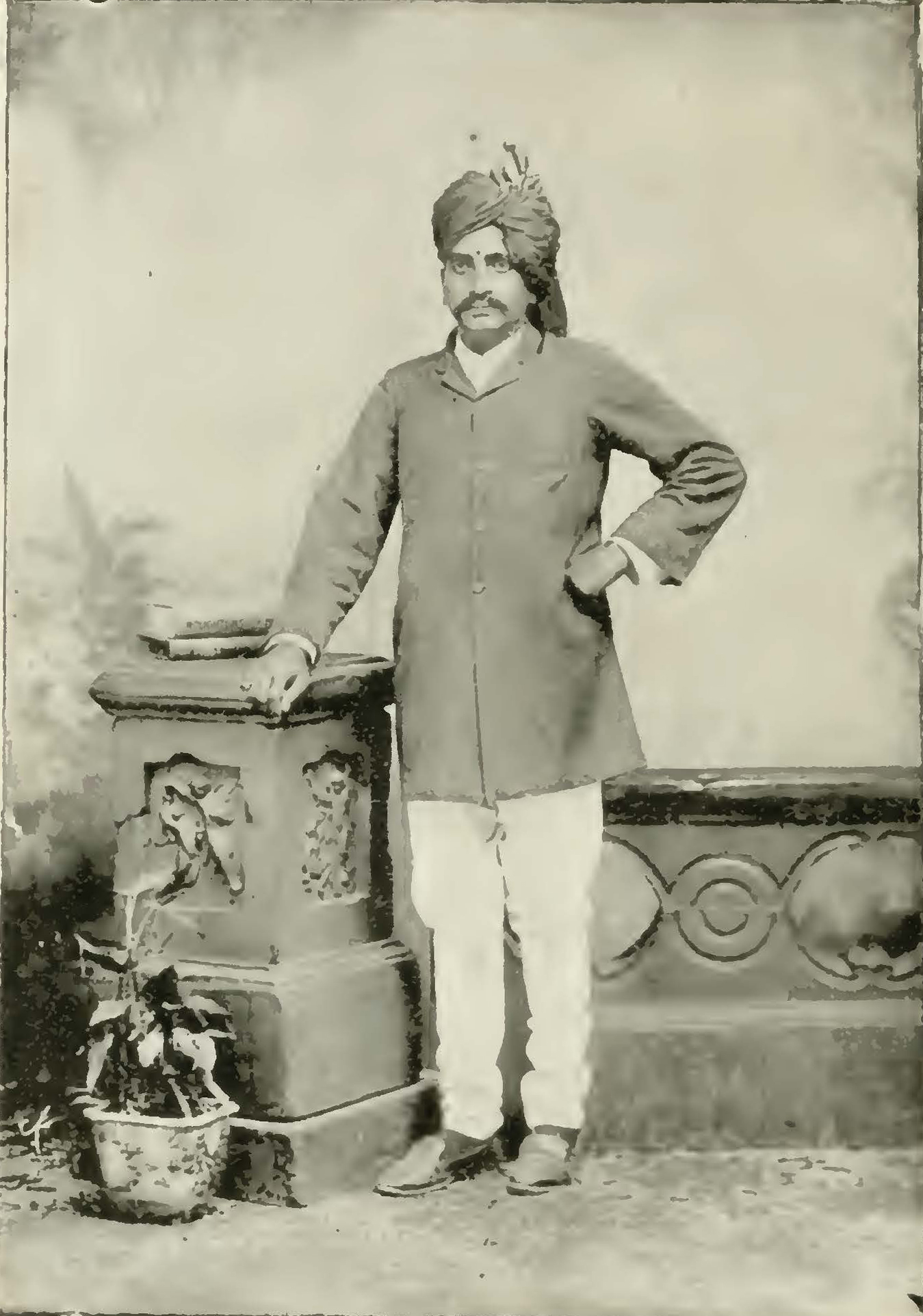
Photograph of Krushnarao II Dhulap, jagirdar of Vijaydurg and descendant of admiral Krushnarao Dhulap I

The Dhulap family was a Maratha noble family of the Maratha Empire in the late 18th century-early 19th century who were hereditary sarkhels or supreme commanders of the Maratha Navy during its decline. They came to power after the Angre family's downfall and Tulaji Angre's defeat at the Battle of Vijaydurg by the East India Company. Rudraji Dhulap (active between 1756-1764) and his son Anandrao Dhulap (active between 1764–1795) successively served as grand admirals of the Maratha Navy.

== Rise to power ==
The Angre family of Kolaba had become divided between Manaji Angre and Sambhaji Angre in the north and south respectively. Sambhaji Angre was succeeded in 1743 by Tulaji Angre, who was a skilled seaman similar to his father Kanhoji Angre. However, he alienated himself from the Maratha Peshwa(de facto ruler and prime minister of the Maratha Empire, Balaji Baji Rao which led to his capture by the East India Company and Peshwa's forces at the Battle of Vijaydurg in 1756. After the downfall of Tulaji Angre, Rudraji Dhulap was appointed as sarkhel or admiral of the Maratha Navy by Peshwa Balaji Baji Rao, and operated between 1756-1764. Rudraji and Janrao Dhulap distinguished themselves in the naval fights against Hyder Ali of Mysore in the Maratha-Mysore Wars, during the reign of Madhavrao I.

== History ==
Rudraji Dhulap was succeeded as sarkhel by his son Anandrao Dhulap, who was active between 1764-1795. The Peshwas Balaji Baji Rao and Madhavrao I tried to revive Maratha naval power by creating an independent naval subah at Vijaydurg under the command of the Dhulap family, however without much success. Thus, the British were easily able to overpower the declining Maratha Navy during the First Anglo-Maratha War. Under the Dhulap family in the late 1700s, the Maratha Navy undertook operations against enemy ships whenever the Marathas were engaged in conflicts with either the British or Hyder Ali of Mysore.

In 1774 A.D. the first Anglo-Maratha war broke out and lasted till 1782 AD, ending with the Treaty of Salbai. However the Maratha Navy under Anandrao Dhulap, pretending to be ignorant of the treaty, attacked the "Ranger", a small brig of 12 guns under the command of Lieutenant Pruanthen on its way from Bombay to Calicut. The attack took place on 8 April 1783, on the coast near Ratnagiri. The English took heavy casualties in the long and fierce fight, after which Anandrao took it to his base at Vijaydurg as a trophy. But on the protest of the English, the Marathas restored the ships and the goods that had been seized and declared the incident closed.

The Dhulap family remained in power until 1812, and their descendants were still living in a neighbourhood of Vijaydurg in the 1980s.

== See also ==
- Tulaji Angre
- Kanhoji Angre
- Maratha Navy
