= Battle of Vijaydurg =

1756 battle of the British conquest of India

- Part of the British conquest of India
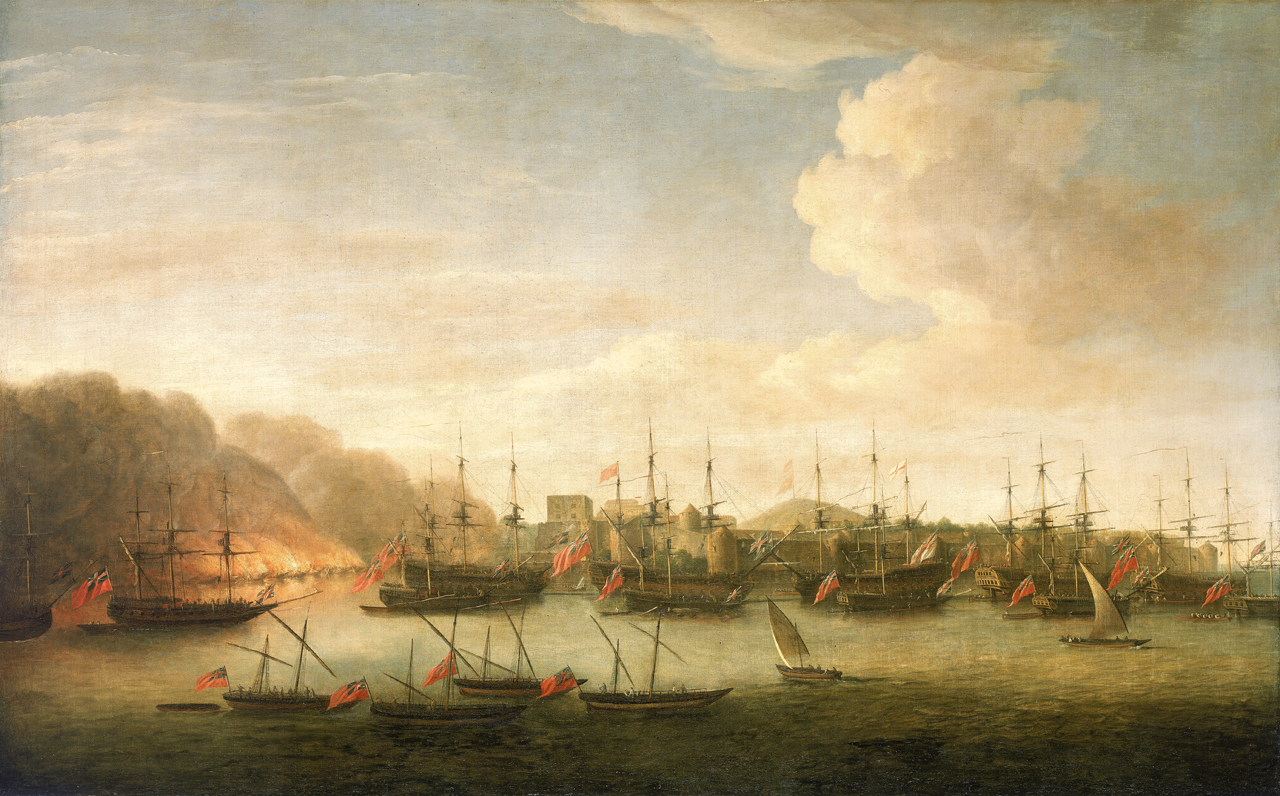
- The Capture of Geriah, February 1756; Dominic Serres, 1771
Date	January– 11 February 1756
Location	Vijaydurg Fort, Maharashtra 16.5607°N 73.3334°E
Result	Anglo-Peshwa victory

Belligerents
Great Britain; East India Company; Maratha Empire	Colaba State

Commanders and leaders
Charles Watson; Sir William James; Robert Clive; Balaji Baji Rao	Tulaji Angre (POW)

Units involved
Royal Navy; Bombay Marine; Maratha Army; Maratha Navy (loyal to the Peshwa)	Maratha Navy (loyal to Colaba)

Strength
20 British ships 500 British marines 1,000 Maratha troops	2,000 men 250 cannons 200 ships

Casualties and losses
Unknown	500+ men

The Battle of Vijaydurg was fought between Tulaji Angre, the Admiral of the Maratha Navy and the combined forces of the British East India Company and the Maratha Empire led by Peshwa Balaji Baji Rao in early 1756.

== Background ==
=== Sarkhel Tulaji ===
After the death of Kanhoji Angre, there were two short tenures of Sarkhoji and Sambhaji Angre. Following it, the two brothers Manaji and Tulaji started fighting for the post of Sarkhel. The Peshwa had intervened in the disputes between Manaji and Tulaji. This created two spheres of influence, Manaji in the north at Kulaba and Tulaji in the south at Vijaydurg. Tulaji was brave and a much more skillful seaman than Manaji. In a brief span, he had surpassed the record of his predecessors in the number of English ships captured: Charlotte of Madras, William of Bombay, Svern of Bengal and, Darby, Restoration, Pilot, Augusta and Dadabhoi of Surat. He had also captured Anjanvel from the Siddis of Janjira.

=== Rebellion of Tulaji Angre ===
Tulaji Angre's tenure was marked by frequent raids into the territories under the Chhatrapatis of Kolhapur and Maratha nobles like the Peshwa, the Pratinidhi, the Sawants of Wadi, etc. These raids led to a feeling of insecurity among the common people and traders of Maharashtra. Tulaji also allied with the Portuguese against the Marathas. Due to Tulaji's actions, the Peshwa, Balaji Baji Rao, was allied with the British to defeat Tulaji Angre. A treaty was signed according to which a ground force under command of the Peshwa and a naval force under command of the company would attack and destroy Tulaji. Among other articles, the treaty provided that Fort Vijaydurg, when captured, would be given to the Peshwa.

=== Fall of Suvarnadurg ===
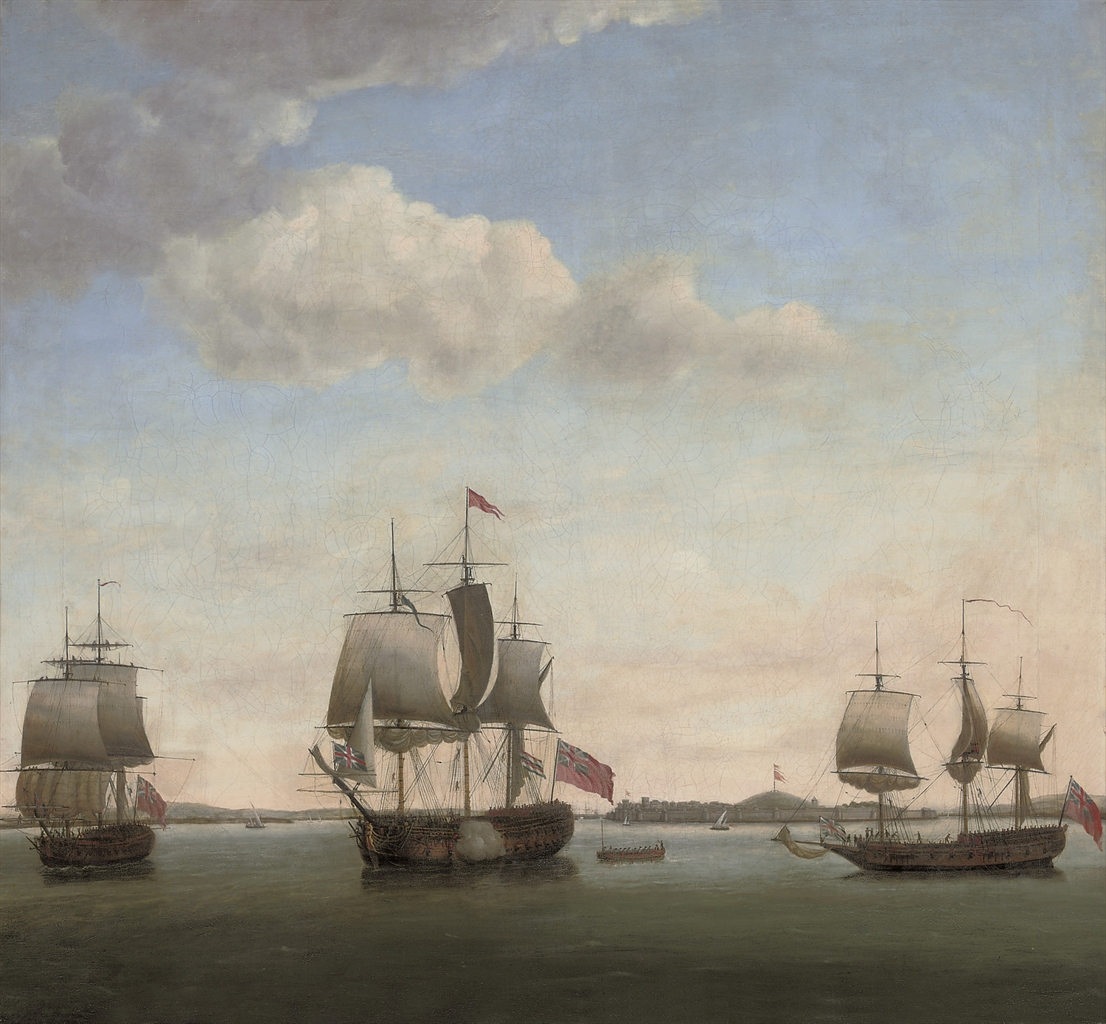
Painting of the fall of Suvarnadurg

In 1755, Commodore William James of the Bombay Marine attacked the fort Suvarnadurg while the Peshwa's army started capturing land and other coastal forts of Angre. This isolated Suvarnadurg from landward. James first bombarded the fort from the west. 800 shots and shells were expended at a range of 100 yards, but the walls did not collapse. He then entered the channel between the fort and the coast and fired on the eastern face as well as the main gate. Both gave way. Some of the garrison tried to escape from the fort by a tunnel running into the sea, but were discovered and killed. Considerable damage had been caused inside the fort by the bombardment and the garrison, finding no hope of relief or reinforcements, surrendered. James' squadron returned to Bombay for the monsoons.

== Battle ==
=== Attack on Vijaydurg ===
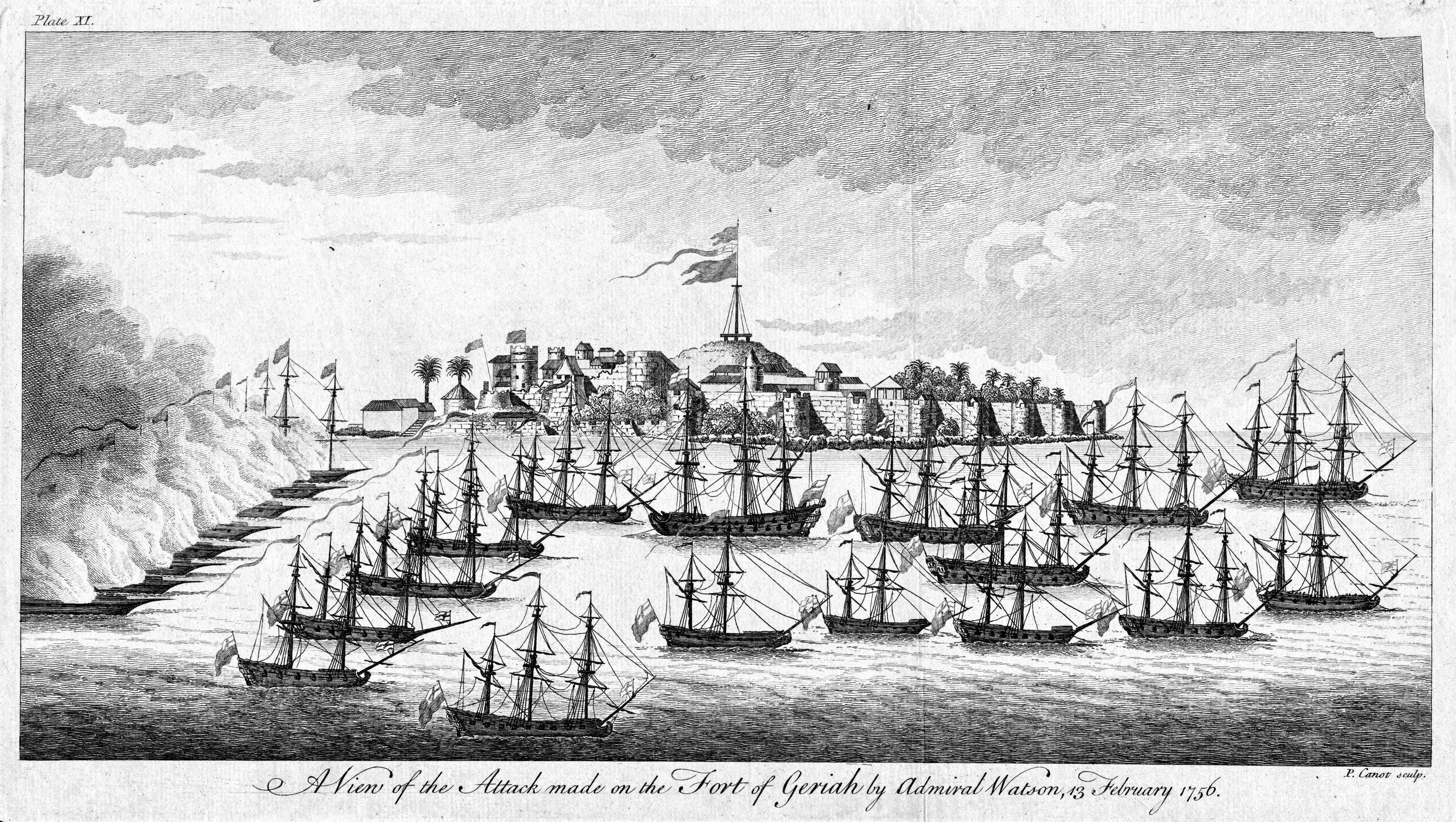
Attack of Vijaydurg

After the fall of Suvarnadurg and all other forts of the Angre, Vijaydurg was the only fort left under the command of Tulaji. In 1756, a large force under Admiral Watson converged on Vijaydurg. Watson had arrived at Bombay from eastern waters and had with him Colonel Clive with 500 topasses and other troops. The English ships took station with Watson flying his flag on HMS Protector. Two bomb vessels were in the extreme east. The Maratha ships were anchored at the mouth of the creek, close to the fort and bunched up, almost hull to hull. Amongst these was the company's ship Restoration, which caught fire. The fire spread rapidly till the entire Angre fleet was destroyed, The bombardment of the fort had caused considerable damage inside the fort and magazine had been blown up.

=== Fall of Vijaydurg ===
Tulaji, meanwhile had left the fort and gone to the Peshwa's camp seeking a negotiation but was promptly arrested and sent to one of the inland forts as a prisoner. The garrison was asked to surrender and in the absence of any response Clive landed his marines on 11 February 1756, entered and captured the fort.

== Aftermath ==
A huge amount of booty was captured. 250 pieces of cannons, stores and ammunition, 100,000 Rupees and 30,000 in valuable items fell into English hands. Vijaydurg was not handed over immediately to the Peshwa as per the terms of the treaty. It was eventually given up after some months. Following Tulaji's arrest, Rudraji Dhulap was given the position of the Admiral of the Maratha Confederacy.
