= Gowalkot =

Fort in India

Govalkot Fort
- Part of Konkan
- Ratnagiri district, Maharashtra

Site information
- Type: Sea fort
- Owner: Government of India
- Controlled by: India (1947-)
- Open to the public: Yes
- Condition: Ruins

Location
- Shown within Maharashtra Govalkot Fort (India)
- Coordinates: 17°32′47.5″N 73°29′16.1″E
- Height: 45m (150 Ft)

Site history
- Materials: Stone

Gowalkot is a small fort located on the southern bank of Vashishti River, about 10.0 km (6.2 miles) from Chiplun in Maharashtra, India. This fort is guarded by the river on three sides and a trench on the fourth side. Its population which includes Hindus, Muslims, and Buddhists. According to old natives of Gowalkot, the history of Gowalkot goes back to a King, who was Hindu and finally was converted in Muslim, his surname was "Chougle", and most of the land in Gowalkot is owned by the Chougle family. All other owner of land in Gowalkot must have either received the land as gift [or bought] from Chougle family must have lost in "kul kaida" a rule by the government.

== History ==
Famous for its ancient fort built by Siddi Habshi of Janjira in 1690. The Gowalkot Fort covers an area of around two acres. In 1660, Shivaji Maharaj won this fort and renamed as Govindgad. Sambhaji Maharaj lost this fort to Siddi.

== Description ==
The fort is dilapidated at present. This fort is spread over 2 acres of land. There is a temple of goddess Karanjeshwari at the foothills of the fort. However, from within the fort, there are trees, buildings and dwellings and a dry well which is approximately 22.0 ft (6.7 m) deep. From the top of the small hill on the fort, the most beautiful and stunning glimpse of the smoothly flowing Vashishti River and the undulating valley is visible. It takes about 1 hour to reach the fort and view all places in the fort. There were about 22 cannons around the fort. The 10 cannons were shifted from the port area to the fort on 29 May 2017 by archeologist from Pune and Chiplun. The longest cannon is 7.5 feet in length. These cannons are British made but, supposed to be used by Maratha army.

== See also ==
- Anjanvel Fort
- Kalusta
- List of forts in India
- Kanhoji Angre
- Murud-Janjira
- List of forts in Maharashtra
- Marathi People
- Maratha Navy
- List of Maratha dynasties and states
- Battles involving the Maratha Empire
- Maratha Army
- Maratha titles
- Military history of India
