= Purnagad =

Fort in Maharashtra, India

Purnagad Fort
- Part of Malabar sea coast
- Ratnagiri district, Maharashtra

Site information
- Type: Sea fort
- Owner: India, Government of India
- Controlled by: Maratha Empire; India (1947-)
- Open to the public: Yes
- Condition: Ruins, Renovated

Location
- Shown within Maharashtra
- Coordinates: 16°48′28.9″N 73°18′53.7″E
- Height: 300 ft.

Site history
- Materials: Stone

Purnagad Fort is a fort located 25 km from Ratnagiri, in Ratnagiri district, of Maharashtra. This fort is very small but an important fort in Ratnagiri district for Kanhoji Angre's Navy that evolved as the modern Indian Navy. The Fort is spread over 22 acres and located on a northern hill on Muchkundi River.

== History ==
The fort is known as one of the bases of Kanhoji Angre's ports. It was used to defend and raid British forces and used for trade with other Europeans. According to some people, it was constructed by the king Shivaji while others give credit to maratha Admiral Kanhoji Angre. This fort exacted less revenue during Peshwa regime.

== Places to see ==
The fort is built using the Black basalt rock and is rectangular in shape. There is a Maruti Idol at the entrance gate. On the entrance gate, Sun-Moon and Ganapati are carved in the stone. Inside the fort is a Holy Basil stand and ruins of the buildings. The other gate opens on the sea side with wonderful view. There are steps to climb a decent height where the Flag stands with a delightful view of ocean and Purnagad Beach that have a history of a firm reign of Kanhoji Angre's Naval powers.

== See also ==
- List of forts in Maharashtra
- List of forts in India
- Maritime history of Europe
- Shivaji
- Marathi People
- Portuguese India
- Maratha Navy
- List of Maratha dynasties and states
- Maratha War of Independence
- Battles involving the Maratha Empire
- Maratha Army
- Maratha titles
- Military history of India
