= Anjanwel =

- Town
- Location in Maharashtra
- Coordinates: 17°33′N 73°09′E
- Country: India
- State: Maharashtra
- Region: Konkan
- District: Ratnagiri
- Taluka: Guhagar
- Elevation: 24 m (79 ft)

Languages
  - Official: Marathi
- Time zone: UTC+5:30 (IST)
- PIN: 415703
- Telephone code: 91-2359

Anjanwel is a small coastal town in Guhagar taluka, Ratnagiri district, in the Konkan region and administrative division of the Indian state of Maharashtra. It is located around 80 kilometres (50 mi) north of the district headquarters of Ratnagiri, 10 kilometres (6.2 mi) north of its taluka, and 200 kilometres (120 mi) south of Mumbai, the state capital. Marathi is the official language spoken by everyone in the village. The nearest villages are Veldur, which is home of an Enron plant, Dhopawe, Vanoshi T. Panchanadi, Navse, and Sakhari Trishul. The Gopalgad Fort, also known as Anjanvel Fort (17.566739°N 73.157358°E) is a coastal fort, half of the fort is on a hill and the other half is directly adjacent to the Arabian Sea. Anjanwel has a tropical monsoon climate with 47% of humidity also due to its proximity to the sea.
