= Anjanvel Fort =

Fort in India

Gopalgad Fort
- अंजनवेल चा किल्ला/ गोपाळगड
- Part of Malabar sea coast
- Ratnagiri district, Maharashtra
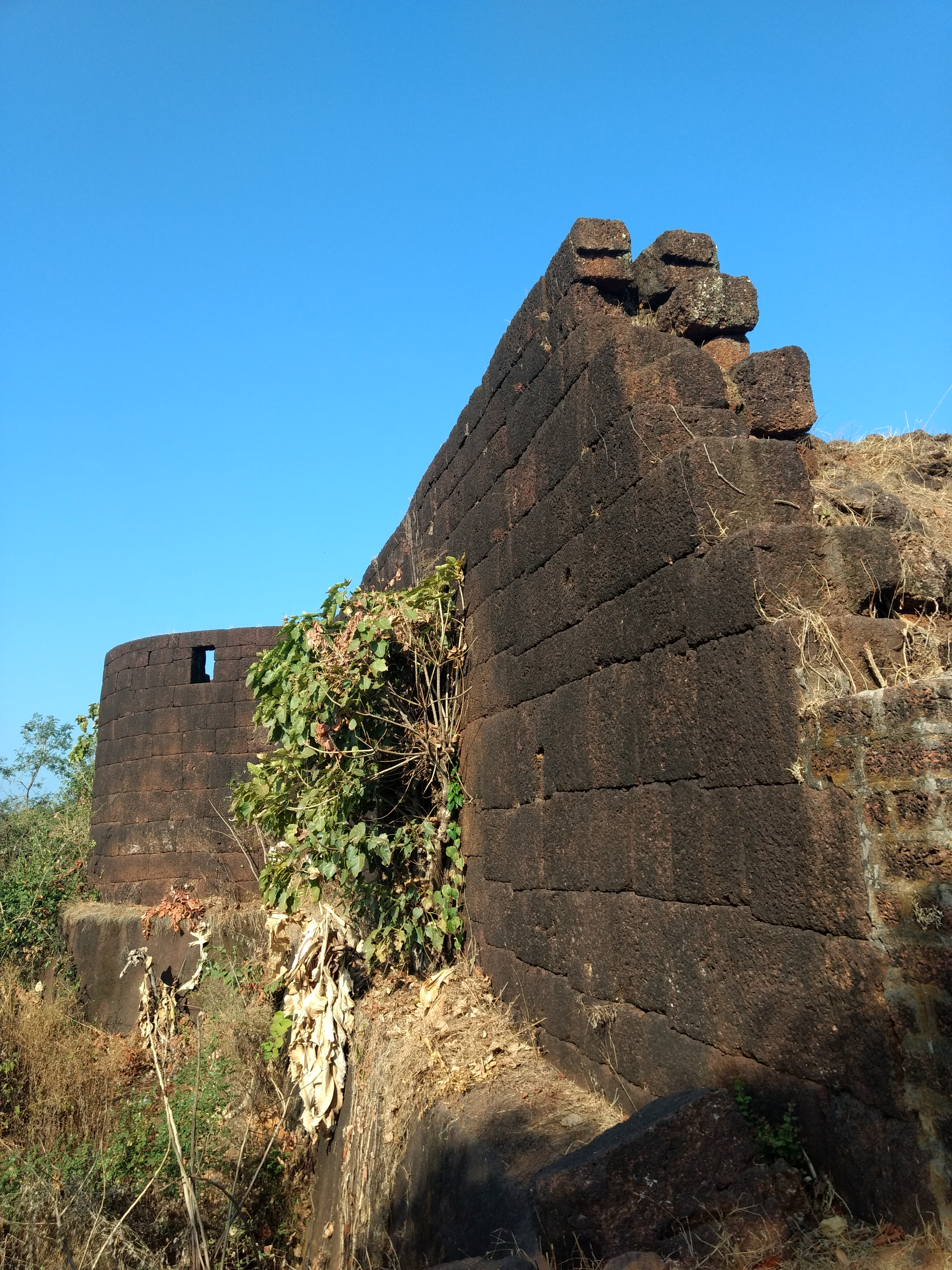
- Anjanvel Fort

Site information
- Type: Sea fort
- Owner: India Government of India
- Controlled by: Bijapur (–1660); Maratha Empire (1660–1699); Janjira State (1699–1745); Maratha Empire (1745–1818); United Kingdom: East India Company (1818–1857); British Raj (1857–1947); India (1947-)
- Open to the public: Yes
- Condition: Ruins

Location
- Shown within Maharashtra
- Coordinates: 17°34′17.3″N 73°09′06.5″E
- Height: 300 Ft.

Site history
- Materials: Stone

Gopalgad Fort / Anjanvel Fort (Marathi: अंजनवेल चा किल्ला/ गोपाळगड) is a fort located 51 km (32 mi) from Chiplun, in Ratnagiri district, of Maharashtra. This fort is an important fort in Ratnagiri district. The Fort is located on a prominent and commanding point for guarding the trade route along the Vashishti River, which runs till Govalkot near Chiplun and the Dabhol port which was a busy route in medieval times. It is a fort located on a hill near the sea.

== History ==
No record evidence about the construction period of this fort is known. It is believed to be built by King ramaraya(a lingayat vani) and later captured by Adil Shah in 1424. This fort was again captured by the King Shivaji from Mohammed Adil Shah of Bijapur in 1660 during his conquest of Dhabol creek. A dockyard/shipbuilding dock was later built by him and the fort was named Gopalgad. It was later under the control of an Abyssinian general Khairriyatkan from 1699 for further 46 years. It was won by Tulaji Angre in 1745. An officer of Angres Ramji Mahadev Bivalkar captured the fort in 1756. The Fort was won by Colonel Kennedy in 1818.

== How to reach ==
The nearest town is Guhagar which is 46 km from Chiplun. The base village of the fort is Anjanvel which is 13 km from Guhagar. There are good hotels at Chiplun, Guhagar, and Anjanvel, now tea and snacks are also available in small hotels along the coastal road. The trekking path starts from the hillock west of the Anjanvel village. Now there is a very safe and wide road up to the fort. It takes about half an hour to reach the entrance gate of the fort.

== Places to see ==
The fort is spread over an area of 7 acres (2.8 ha). The Fort is rectangular in shape with a dry moat on all the sides. The Fort walls are 12 feet high and 8 feet thick. The road to the fort ends near a small entrance on the western side of the fort. There were 15 bastions on the outer walls of the fort armed with cannons. there was an inscription in Persian language on the fort till 1707, now it is nowhere seen. The entire fort is constructed from lateritic rock. The fort is divided into three sections: Varchakot, Parkot and Balekot. There is a small entrance to the Padkot which opens to the outer-side. There is a mango orchard inside the fort walls, the fort has remained in a dispute for ownership issue. There is an ancient temple of Uddalakeshwar near the fort. There is a lighthouse about 2 km from the fort which can be visited by paying a nominal fee.

== See also ==
- List of forts in Maharashtra
- List of forts in India
- Kanhoji Angre
- Marathi People
- Maratha Navy
- List of Maratha dynasties and states
- Maratha War of Independence
- Battles involving the Maratha Empire
- Maratha Army
- Maratha titles
- Military history of India

== Gallery ==
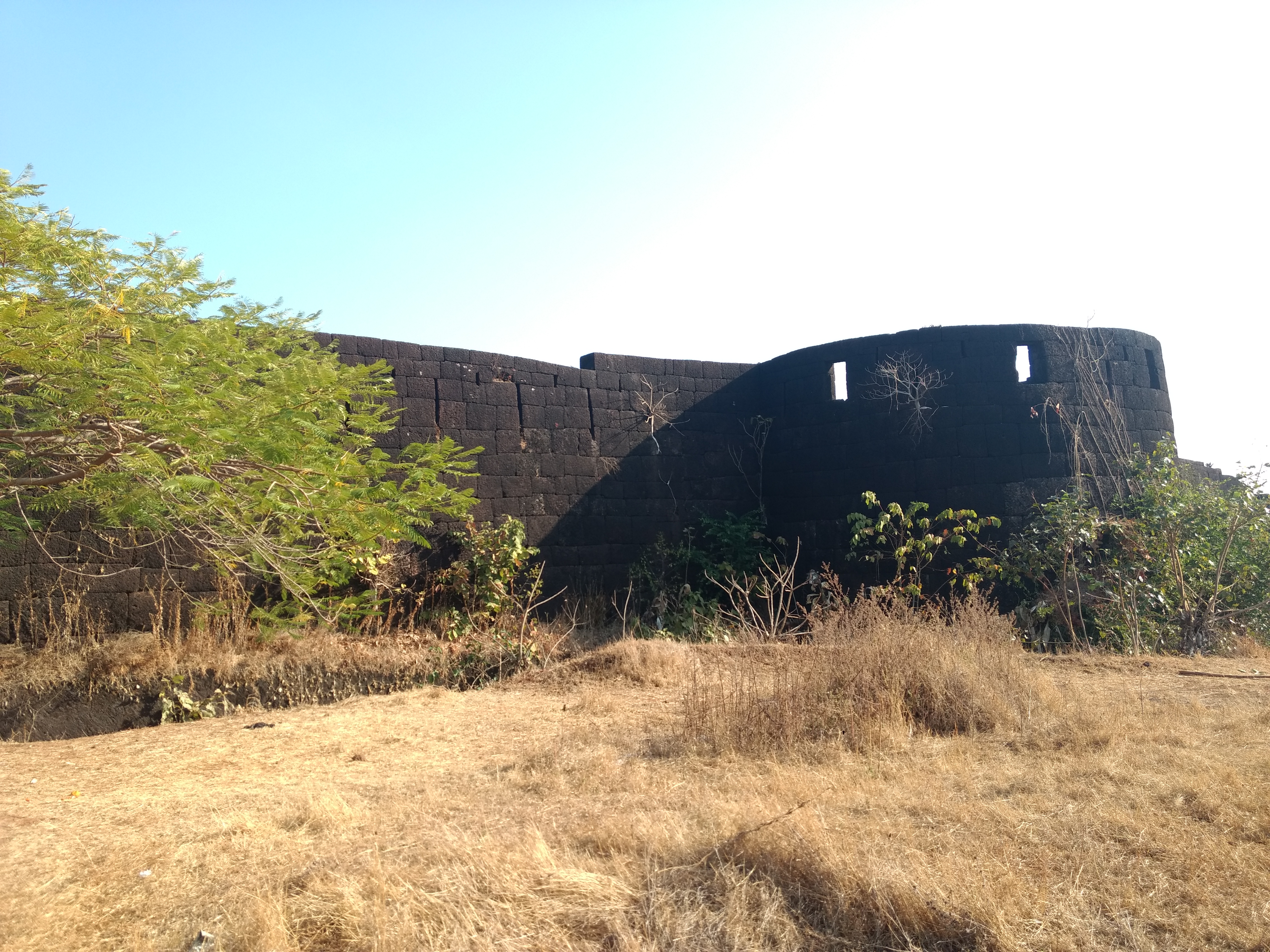

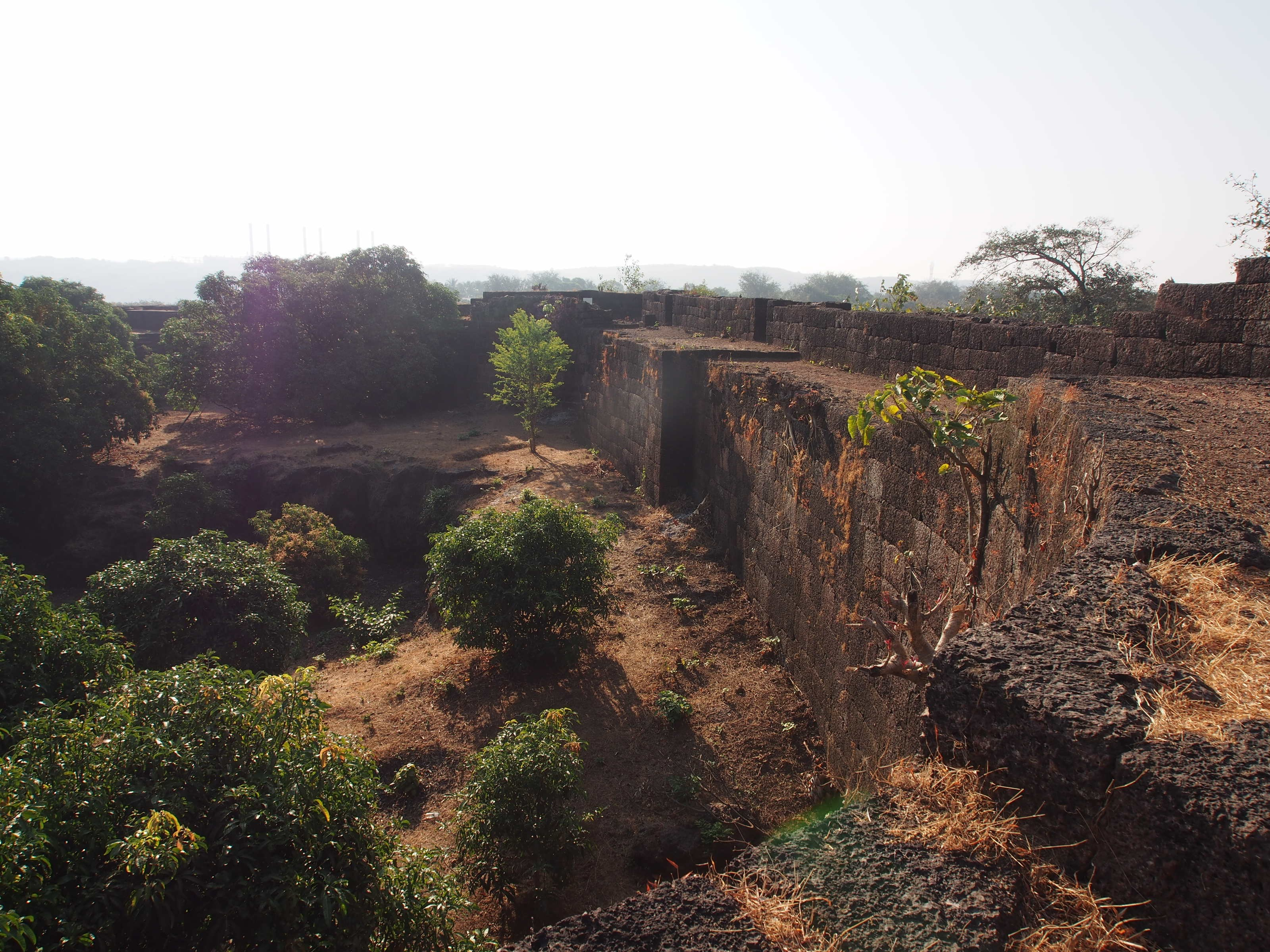

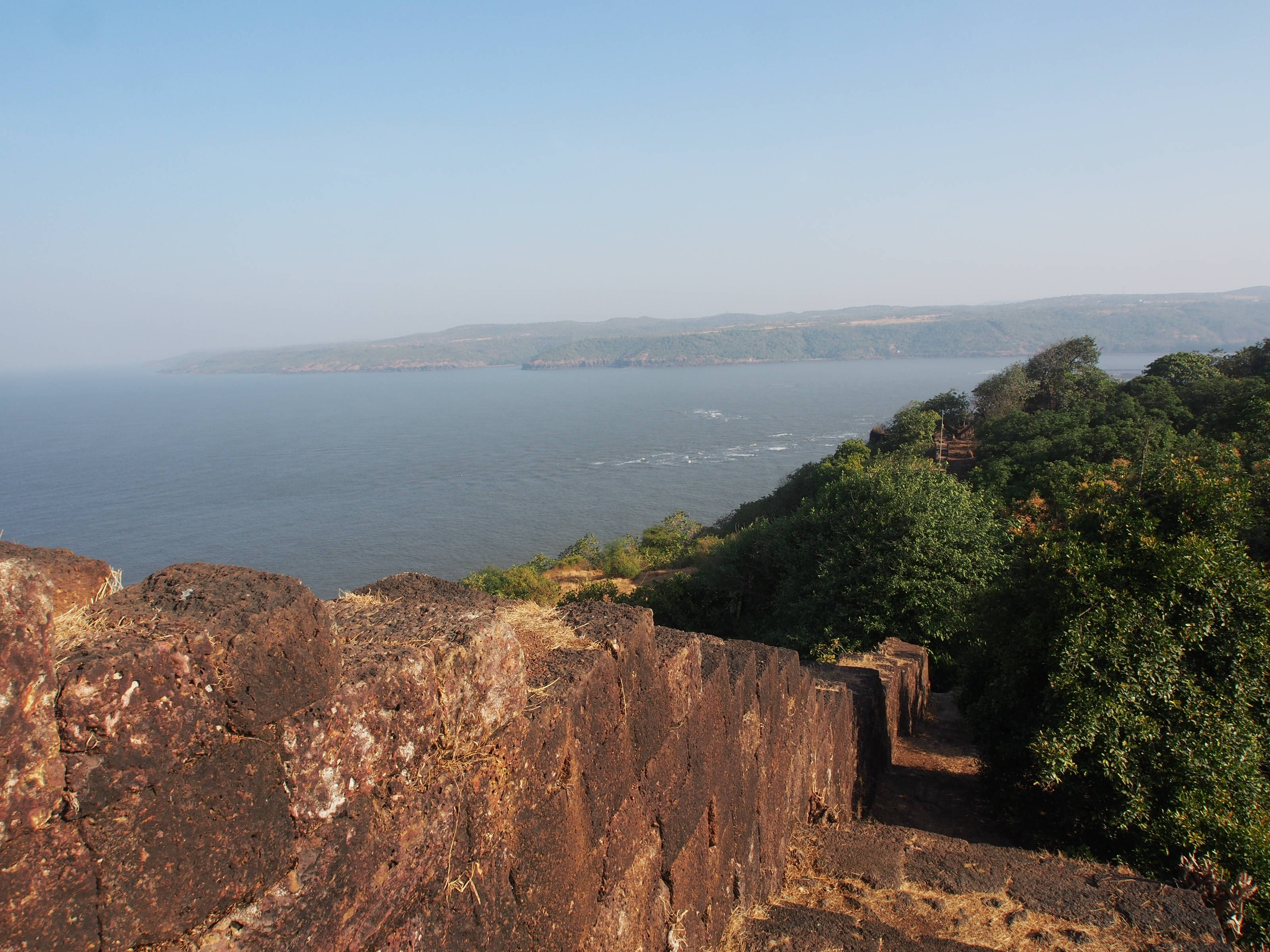
