= Jagtap =

The Jagtap is a clan of Marathas and Koli caste mostly found in the Indian states of Maharashtra, Goa and Union Territories of Dadra and Nagar Haveli.

== Notable people ==
People who bear this surname are include:

- Aditya Jagtap (born 1992), Indian squash player
- Bhai Jagtap, Indian politician
- Laxman Pandurang Jagtap (born 1963), Indian politician
- Manali Jagtap (born 1978), Indian politician and artist
- Mitalee Jagtap, Indian actress
- Sangram Arun Jagtap, Indian politician
- Vilasrao Narayan Jagtap, Indian politician
- Virendra Jagtap (born 1963), Indian politician
