= Suvarnadurg =

Fort on an island in Maharashtra, India

- Part of Harnai port of Ratnagiri District
- Harnai, India
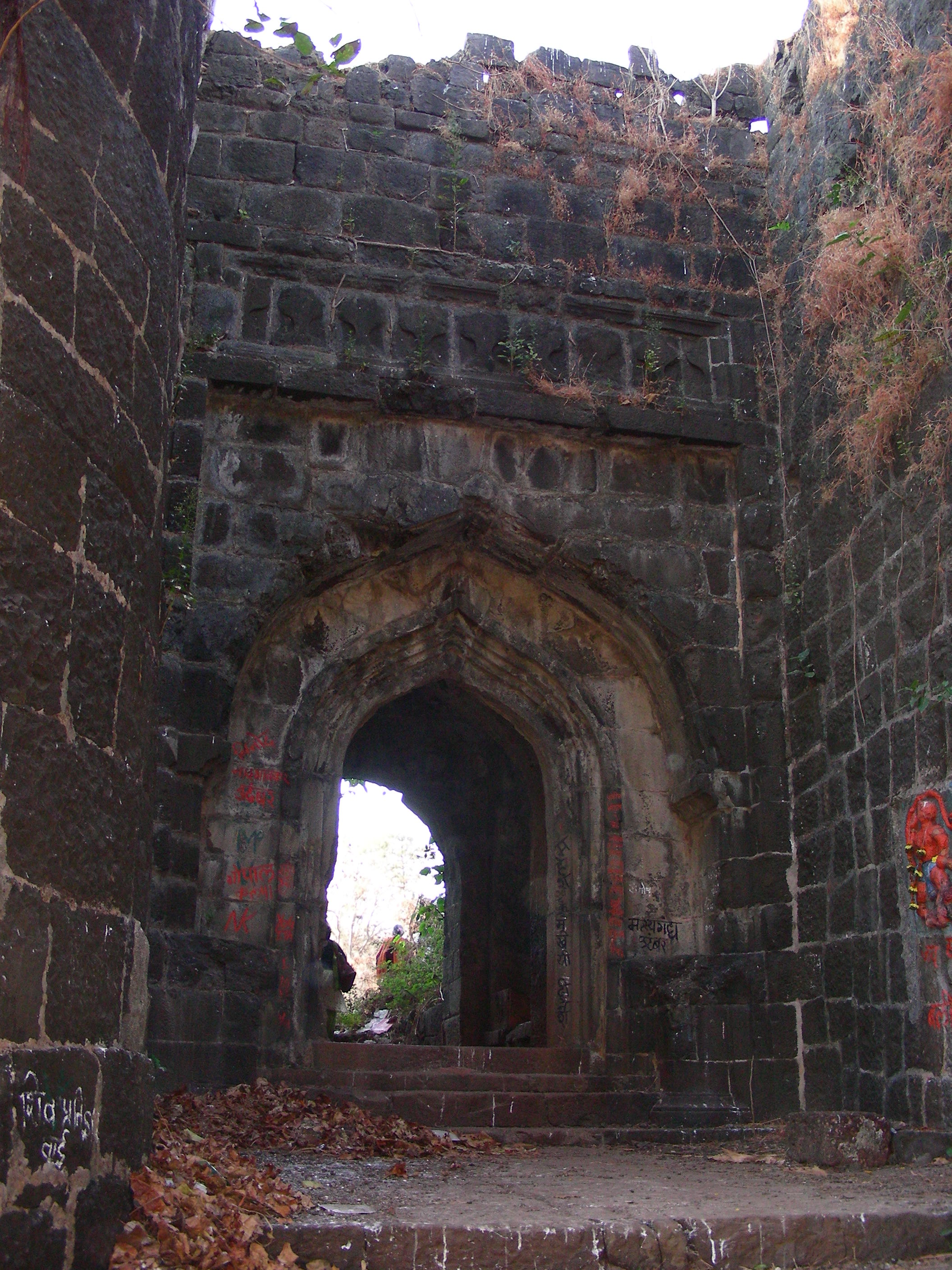
- Entrance to Suvarnadurg fort

Site information
- Type: Fort
- Controlled by: Government of Maharashtra
- Open to the public: Yes
- Condition: Ruins

Location
- Location of Suvarnadurg in Maharashtra, India
- Location within Maharashtra
- Coordinates: 17.817°N 73.085°E

Site history
- Built: Seventeenth century
- Built by: Adil Shahi dynasty
- Battles/wars: Marathas, Angrias and British
- Events: Battles for the fort in 1755 and 1818

UNESCO World Heritage Site
- Part of: Maratha Military Landscapes of India
- Criteria: Cultural: iv, vi
- Reference: 1739-008
- Inscription: 2025 (47th Session)

Suvarnadurg (translation: Golden Fort, also spelt Severndroog in English, a spelling sometimes also used for Savandurga) is a fort that is located on a small island in the Arabian Sea, near Harnai in Konkan, in the Indian state of Maharashtra on the west coast of India between Mumbai and Goa.

The literal meaning of Suvanadurga in the Marathi language is "Golden Fort" as it was considered as the pride or the "feather in the golden cap of Marathas". Built by Adilshah Navy for defence purposes, the fort also had a shipbuilding facility. The basic objective of establishing the fort was to counter enemy attacks, mainly by the colonialists of Europe and also by the local chieftains.

In the past, the land fort and the sea fort were connected by a tunnel, but this is now defunct. The present approach to the sea fort is only by boats from the Harnai port on the headland. It is a protected monument. The fort also includes another small land fort called the Kanakadurga at the base of headland of Harnai port on the coast. Building of the fort is credited to Chhatrapati Shivaji Maharaj, founder of the Maratha Empire, in 1660. Subsequently, Chhatrapati Shivaji Maharaj, other Peshwas and the Angres further fortified the forts for defence purposes.

== Geography ==
The fort is on an island in the Arabian Sea on the west coast within the jurisdiction of Ratnagiri district, off the Kanakadurga fort and below the headland Harnai port. The nearest town is Dapoli, a hill station (near Chiplun), 17 kilometres (11 mi) from Harnai. Kanakadurga, the harbour fort, built originally as a strategic link to the sea fort has a lighthouse. Harnai, near the dilapidated Kanakadurg fort, is an important harbour, which is right on the edge of the land that protrudes into the Arabian Sea. This is a natural harbour known for large fishing and marketing. It is conjectured that the Kanakadurga fort and other land side forts such as Bankot fort, Fategad fort and Gova fort were built primarily as lookout forts for the security of the Suvarnadurg fort. There is no landing jetty at the Suvarnadurga fort. However, the landing is on the shores of the sandy beach of the rocky island. Another feature of the area is that a narrow channel separates the Gova, Kanakadurg and Fattehgarh forts on the mainland.

Climate

The general climate on the west coast, which is where the Suvarnadurg is located, could be categorised as hot and humid. The temperatures vary from a maximum of 38 °C (100 °F) in summer to a low of 24 °C (75 °F) in winter. South West Monsoon controls the precipitation on the west coast, which lasts from June to September, and rainfall is in the range of 140–170 centimetres (55–67 in).

== History ==
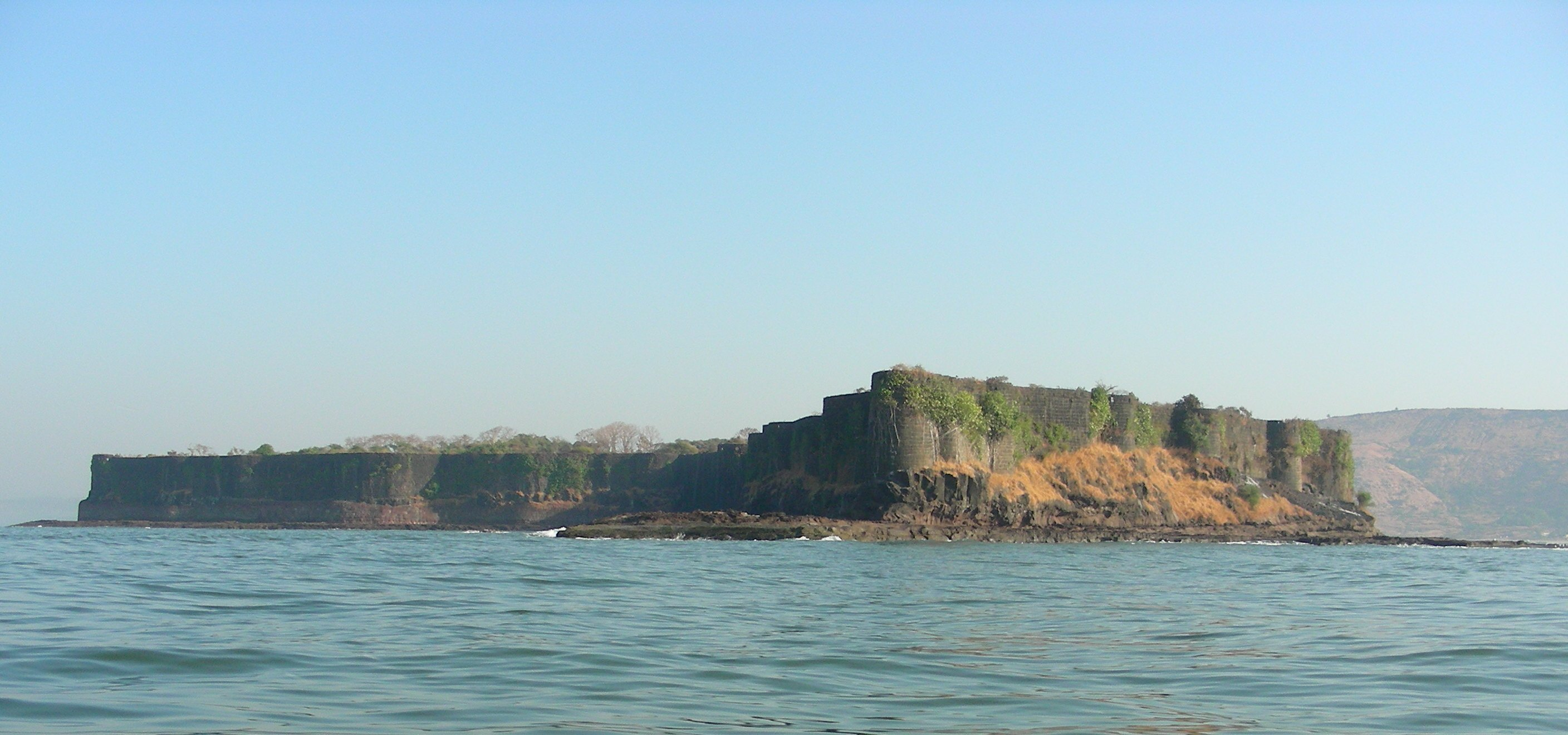
Suvarnadurg fort

Kanhoji Angre, popularly known as "Samudratla Shivaji" (Shivaji of the sea) was the Admiral of the Maratha Navy; in 1696, Kanhoji's naval fleet was stationed here. However, the fort was formally handed over to Kanhoji in 1713 by Shahu Raja. Angre, who was also known as Kanhoji Angria, was appointed in 1698 as Admiral of the Maratha Naval Fleet by the Peshwas. He had complete control over the west coast, from Mumbai to Vengurla, except for the fort of Janjira, which remained with the Siddis (for 200 years). For maintaining "fealty" with the Sataras (Shivaji's family stronghold), he was granted 26 forts and its dependent villages, which included Suvarnadurg. In subsequent years, these forts became strongholds for piracy. According to both Indian historians of Anglo-Maratha Wars such as Anil Athale and now revisionist western historians such as John Keay and Simon Leyton. Leyton wrote in The "Moghul's Admiral": Angrian "Piracy" and the Rise of British Bombay: "It is now generally accepted by historians that Kanhoji [Angre], at least, was not a pirate in any sense of the word; rather, he is more properly thought of as the 'Admiral' of the Marathas"—an Indian Kingdom—"who for many years confronted European attempts to claim navigational rights over coastal shipping lanes".

He had two legitimate and two illegitimate sons, and Sambaji his legitimate son was given control of Suvarnadurg. Following the death of one of the brothers in 1734, there were intense fights and acts of piracy continued. In spite of conflicts with the British East India Company in 1732, Sambaji was back in Suvarnadurg unharmed. However, by 1749, Tulaji, the stepbrother of Sambaji, had become very powerful and his ships sailed unharmed, even much bolder than what his father Kanhoji had achieved. This situation forced the Peshwas to join forces with the British to suppress Tulaji's activities. In 1755, they jointly attacked Tulaji's stronghold of Suvarnadurg and took control of the fort within 48 hours. Suvarnadurg was then given to the Peshwas, who subsequently gave it to the British.

Subsequent to Kanhoji's demise, Tulaji Angre took charge of Suvarnadurg and it became the seat of his power. However, he fell foul of the Peshwas. He was considered arrogant. In the war with Tulaji, the Peshwas were supported by the British. The joint siege of the fort lasted from 25 March to 2 April 1755. On 12 April 1755, British Commodore William James captured the fort and formally handed it over to the Peshwas. However, this support proved detrimental to the Peshwas, as the British extracted, as a reward, control over the Bankot fort but only allowed the Peshwas to have control over the Suvarnadurg. In 1802, Bajirav Peshwa under attack by the Holkars was trying to take refuge in this fort but had to flee to Vasai as he was chased to the fort by the Holkars. In 1818, Captain William, leading a British force, attacked the fort and took full control of it on 4 December 1818. Soon thereafter the other forts also came under British control. The fort was thus under the control of the Peshwas till 1818. The fort has witnessed a scene of "triumph and tragedy, of the display of heroic courage and abject cowardice."

The Angrias are also credited with not only strengthening the fort but also establishing the shipbuilding yard at Suvanadurg and creating a large fleet of warships to secure the west coast, the Konkan coast, from encroachment by the British, French and Dutch East India companies. It is also inferred that the small forts (Guva, Kanakadurga, Bankot fort, Fattegad fort and Gova fort) were primarily built by Kanhoji Angre to defend Suvarnadurg from any enemy attack from the land route.

== Structures ==
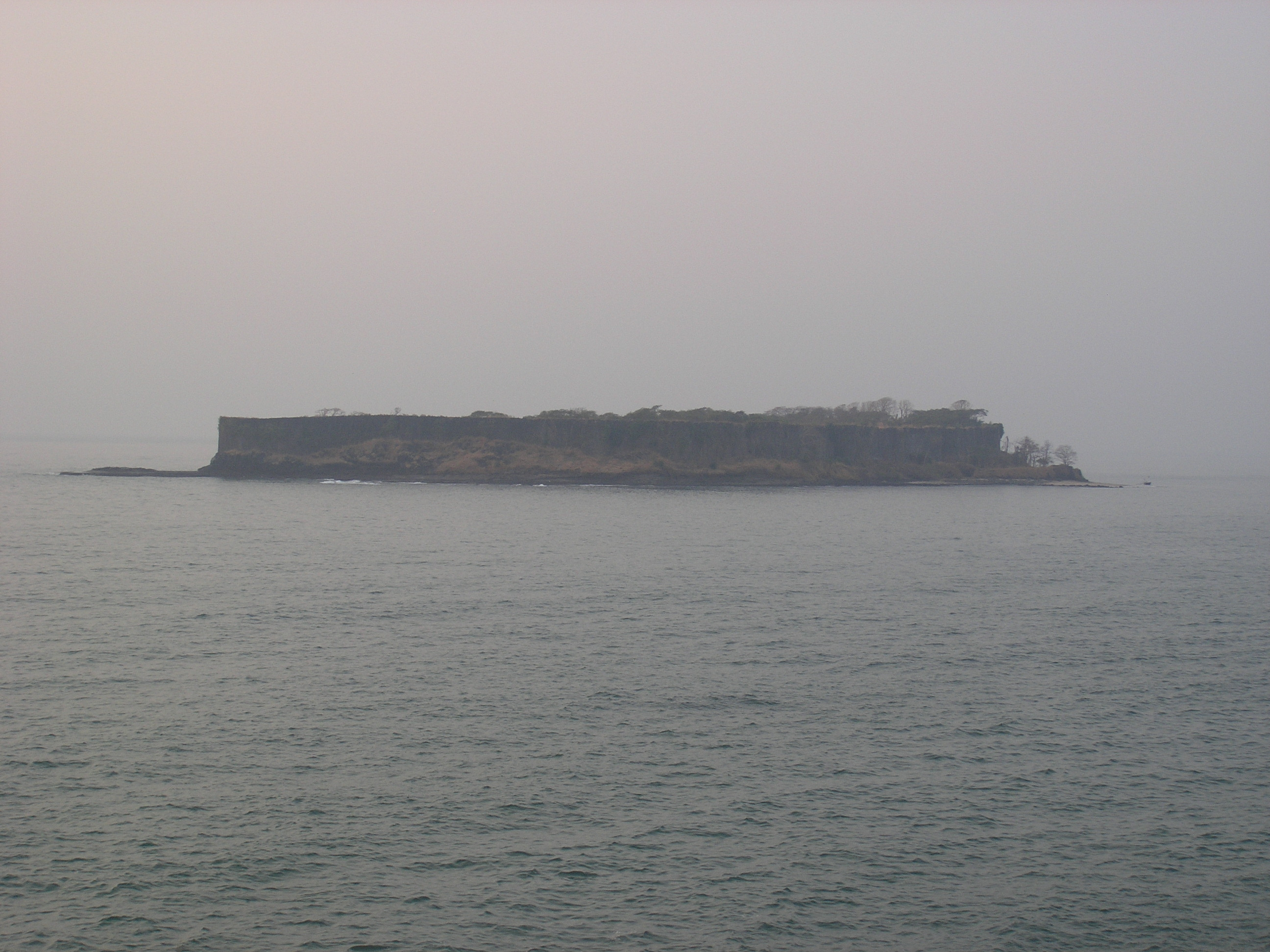
Left: Suvanadurg, a mile away from the mainland.

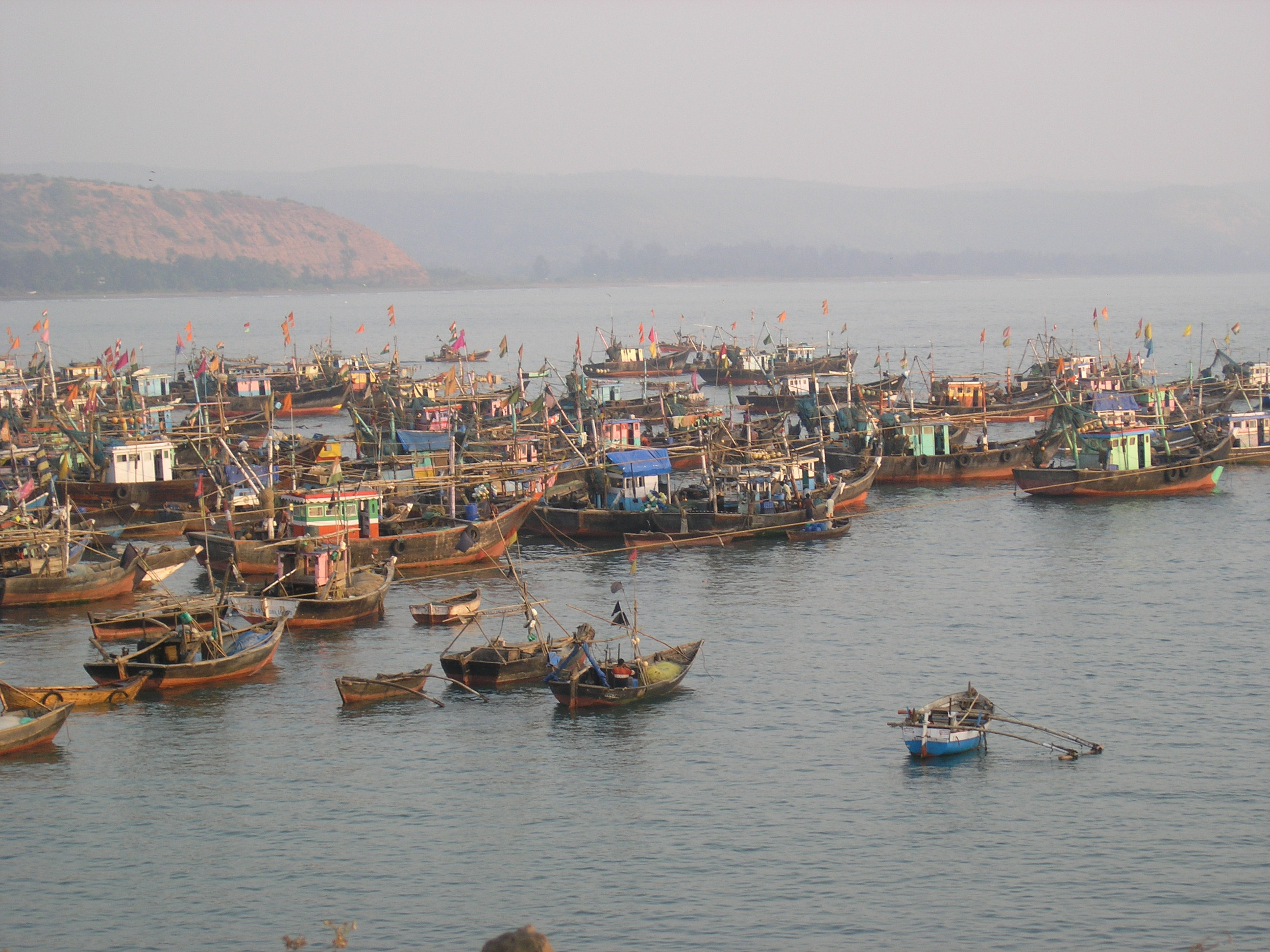
Right: Harnai Port on the mainland

Suvarnadurg fort is located on a rocky island in the Arabian Sea on the west coast. It is spread over an area of 8 acres (3.2 ha) and is about 1 mile (1.6 km) from the main land. As is common in other similar forts, it is encircled by a dry moat. It tapers towards the southern direction from where the Kanakadurga fort is clearly visible. The walls have been mostly cut out of the rock exposures on the island. However, some part of the fort walls are built with large stone blocks of 10–12 feet (3.0–3.7 m) square. It has two entrances or gates, known as the 'Mahadarwaja' (big gate) also called the postern wall (above the high tide level) on the east and 'Chor Darwaja' on the west; the former gate faces the land and the latter faces the sea. The fort comes into sight only at very close quarters.

The fort can be approached only during the low tide condition when it is also easier to walk in the precincts of the fort. The present entry from the main east gate is blocked by thorny bushes but can be accessed from a narrow entry, locally known as the devdis. At the main entry, carvings of a Hanuman carved on the wall and a carved turtle on one of the leading steps are seen. The sea-gate depicts carved figures of a tiger, eagle and elephants. The fort is fortified with many bastions, which also have small built-in rooms. The central part of the fort has two granaries and a decrepit building. From the Chor Darwaja, steps lead to the fort. Locations of old palaces in the fort area are inferred from the large number of foundation plinths seen in the fort area. A stone building in the fort precincts has been identified as an ammunition magazine. Fifteen old guns have also been located in the fort.

There are several potable water sources (tanks, ponds and wells) in the fort; however, these dry up in the summer months. There is step well, which has plenty of water.

Kanakadurga fort

Kanakdurga fort (headland fort) projects into the sea, adjoins the Harnai port and is spread over an area of 0.25 hectares (0.62 acres). It is approached through a flight of steps. This fort is now in ruins, except for a few water tanks, two dilapidated bastions (one at each end), a lighthouse on elevated ground, and also a residence for the caretaker. It was also once a military camp. The fort has nine water ponds with abundant water supply, of which eight are separated by stone walls and the ninth pond is a little away to the west.

== Visitor information ==
Mumbai is at a distance of 230 kilometres (140 mi) from Harnai. Harnai, located in a rocky bay, has an all-weather road that connects to Dapoli and Khed. The road distances to other nearby forts and towns are: Bankot-Anjarle-Harnai: 23 kilometres (14 mi); Dapoli-Harnai: 16 kilometres (9.9 mi); and Anjarle-Harnai: 7 kilometres (4.3 mi). The only approach to the fort is by boats, from Harnai. Boats have to be arranged through the local fishermen. It is a port of call for coastal steamers and thrives on fishing as a major marketing centre. The nearest railway station on the Konkan Railway of the Indian Railways is at Khed. The nearest airport is at Mumbai.
