= Kanhoji Angre =

Maratha Navy officer (1669–1729)

Sakal Rajkarya Dhurandhar Vishwasnidhi Rajmanya Rajeshri Kanhoji Angre Sarkhel Vizarat Mal
- कान्होजी आंग्रे
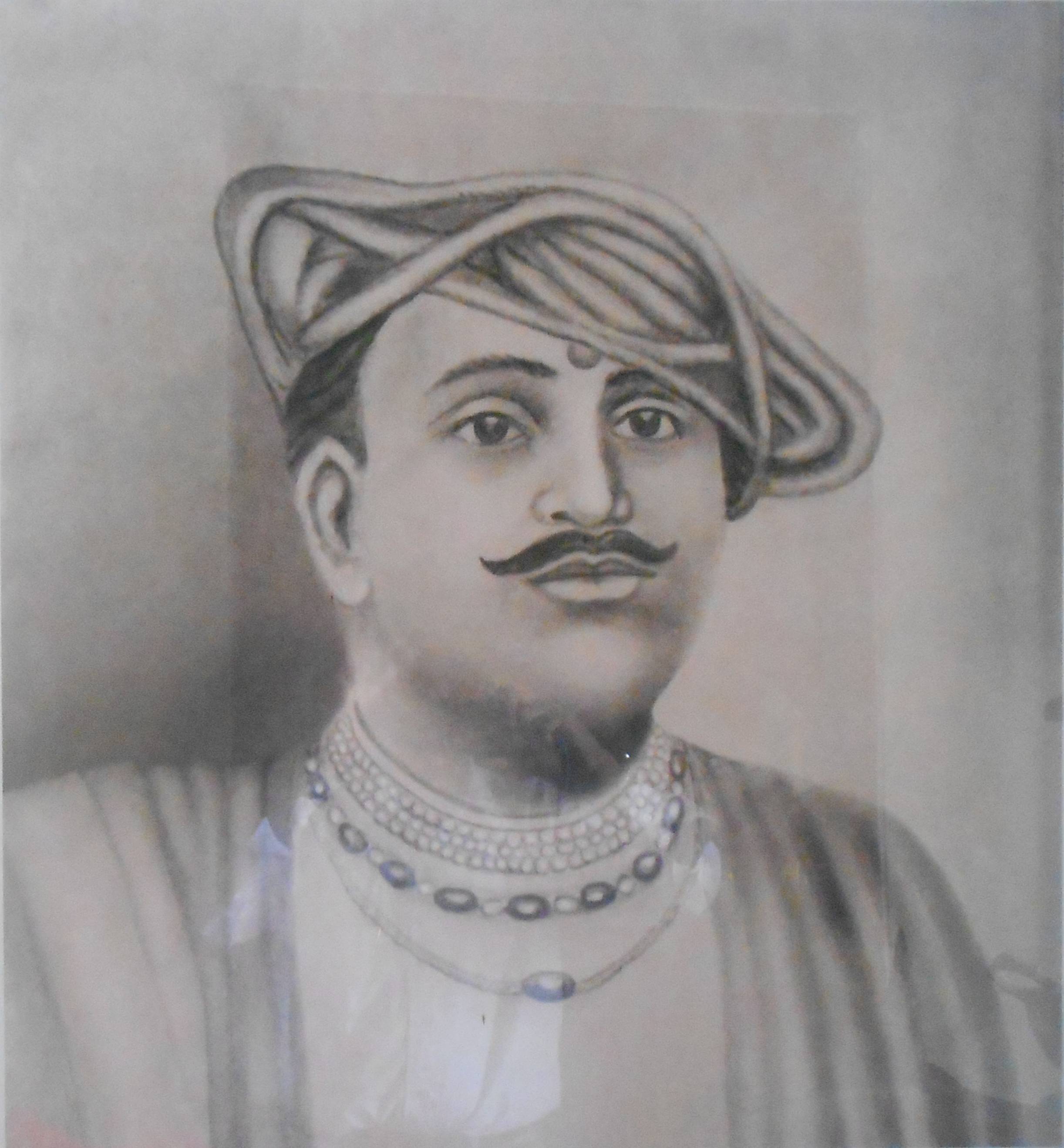
- 18th-century Maratha Navy chief Kanhoji Angre
- Born: 1669; Suvarnadurg, Maratha Confederacy (modern day Ratnagiri, Maharashtra, India)
- Died: 4 July 1729 (aged 59–60); Colaba, Colaba State, Maratha Empire (modern day Alibag, Maharashtra, India)
- Spouses: Mathurabai; Lakshmibai; Gahinabai
- Children: Sekhoji; Sambhaji; Manaji; Tulaji; Yesaji; Dhondji
- Military career
- Allegiance: Maratha Empire
- Service: Maratha Navy
- Service years: 1689–1729
- Rank: Sar-Subhedar
- Memorials: Kanhoji Angre island; INS Angre; Angre port; Angria Bank; Cruise Ship Angriya

Signature
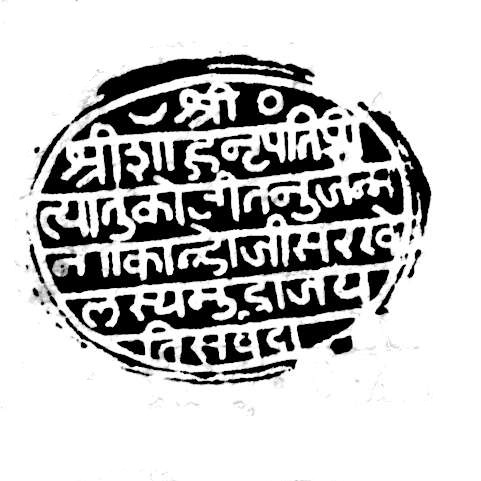

Kanhoji Angre ([kanʱod͡ʒiː aːŋɡɾe]), also known as Conajee Angria or Sarkhel Angré (1669 – 4 July 1729) was a Maratha Navy admiral. Kanhoji became known for attacking and capturing European East Indiamen and collecting jakat (known to locals as taxes), seen by Europeans traders and colonists as ransoming of their crews. British, Dutch, and Portuguese ships often fell victims to these raids. Despite attempts by the Portuguese and British to put an end to his privateering activities, Angre continued to capture and collect jakat from European merchant ships until his death in 1729. Kanhoji's naval prowess in capturing dozens of European trading ships and avoiding capture has led to many historians to appraise Kanhoji as the most skilled Indian navy chief in the maritime history of India.

== Titles ==
In 1713, Shahu dispatched a formidable force led by the Peshwa, Bahiroji Pingale, to protect the region's inland territories and curb the expanding influence of Angria. However, upon learning of the Peshwa's advance, the seasoned warrior Kanhoji swiftly mobilized his forces, confronting and decisively defeating the Peshwa, taking him captive. Expanding his conquests, Kanhoji seized strategic forts like Lohagad and Rajmachi near Khandala, poised to advance towards Satara. In response, all available troops were rallied under the command of Balaji Vishwanath, recognizing the magnitude of Kanhoji's prowess and ambition. A negotiation ensued, wherein Balaji proposed terms: if Kanhoji released the Peshwa, severed ties with Sambhaji, pledged allegiance to Shahu, and relinquished his conquests except for Rajmachi, he would be granted ten forts and sixteen fortified posts, crowned as the admiral of the Maratha fleet with the prestigious titles of Vizarat Mal and Sarkhel.

== Early life ==
Angre was born on the fort Suvarnadurg, near Ratnagari in the year 1669 to mother, Ambabai and father, Tukoji. His father served at Suvarnadurg under Chatrapati Shivaji Maharaj with a command of 200 posts. Kanhoji family background attracted much wild speculation amongst European Merchants, travelers and writers in the 18th century, and later. In 2009, modern Dutch Historian, Rene Barendse, specializing in South Asian history as well as history related to the Indian Ocean, summarises that Kanhoji Angre's origin is highly controversial. He writes:

To the British he was of Siddi (east african) descent (Note: Historian Kaushik Roy cites the writing of a 1700s contemporary of Angre and states that "according to Clement Downing, a sailor and contemporary of Angre. He has written of his personal encounters in the sea in the early 1700s in the book "History Of The Indian Wars" written in the 18th century and published by Oxford University Press in the early 20th century. As per his account, Kanhoji's father was an Arabian Kafri who accepted Islam and served in the fleet of the Siddis of Janjira. Probably Kanhoji's forefathers came from south Africa and some of them later settled in the Gulf of Ormuz where they accepted Islam".) (Note: Historian Dr.Arunchandra Pathak, in 2007, has published details from earlier records of Kolaba districts. Pathak writes: It contains authentic and useful information on several aspects of the district and is considered to be of great value to administrators, scholars and general readers. The revised edition of it was compiled and published in 1964. But the old gazetteer published during the British regime contained much valuable information, which was not reproduced in the revised edition. Therefore, the department decided to reprint this volume. Accordingly Kolaba District Gazetteer (1883) was reprinted in 1989. Considering its utility, need was felt to preserve this treasure of knowledge. According to these records, Grose, has given information on Kanhoji's heritage. Grose writes in 1750 that Tukaji was an African Muslim who was born in the Gulf of Hormuz and in 1643 was shipwrecked near Chaul. He helped Shahaji in the war with the Moghals and married the daughter of Shahaji's minister, and their son Parab was the father of Kanhoji. This is an example of foreign warriors being admitted into the Hindu fold and acquiring Hindu wives and other such examples are given in the chapter on Thana History.) , to the nationalist Maratha literature an impeccable Maratha. According to the Portuguese Angre was of "vile and poor" origins, and he "exercised the office of servant and peon for another Hindu" – most likely he was a Koli. But he adroitly used his vaunted Ethiopian descent to gain ascendancy over the other bands of seafarers and their leaders along the Konkan Coast, a group that the Dutch with some justification called "Shivaji's roving and robbing armadas".

Other sources, mainly Indian, on his family background go into details of each opinion. As per Rajaram Narayan Saletore, his surname "Angre" is derived from Angarwadi; the family's original name was Sankpal, and the family members before Kanhoji were known as Sankpals. Historian Sen believes that Angre's origin is "obscure and he certainly did not belong to the nobility of the land". Citation of the Arquivo Histórico Ultramarino (historical archives of the Portuguese empire) is given to show that Kanhoji started his life as a humble servant of some Hindus in the island of Versova. According to his family history, he was a "Kshatriya" Maratha. Historian V. G. Dighe, in 1951, cites G. S. Sardesai's Selections from the Peshwa Daftar, and calls them "blue-blood Marathas" who "would spurn to marry in families lower than those of Deshmukhs, Jadhavs, Jagtaps and Shitoles." However, S.R.Sharma seems to agree with the Portuguese opinions and believes him to have been a "Maratha Koli captain". Little is known about his early life except that he was involved in daring exploits at sea with his father. He spent much of his childhood in the Suvarnadurg Fort. Kanhoji grew up among Koli sailors, and learned seamanship from them.

== Naval career ==
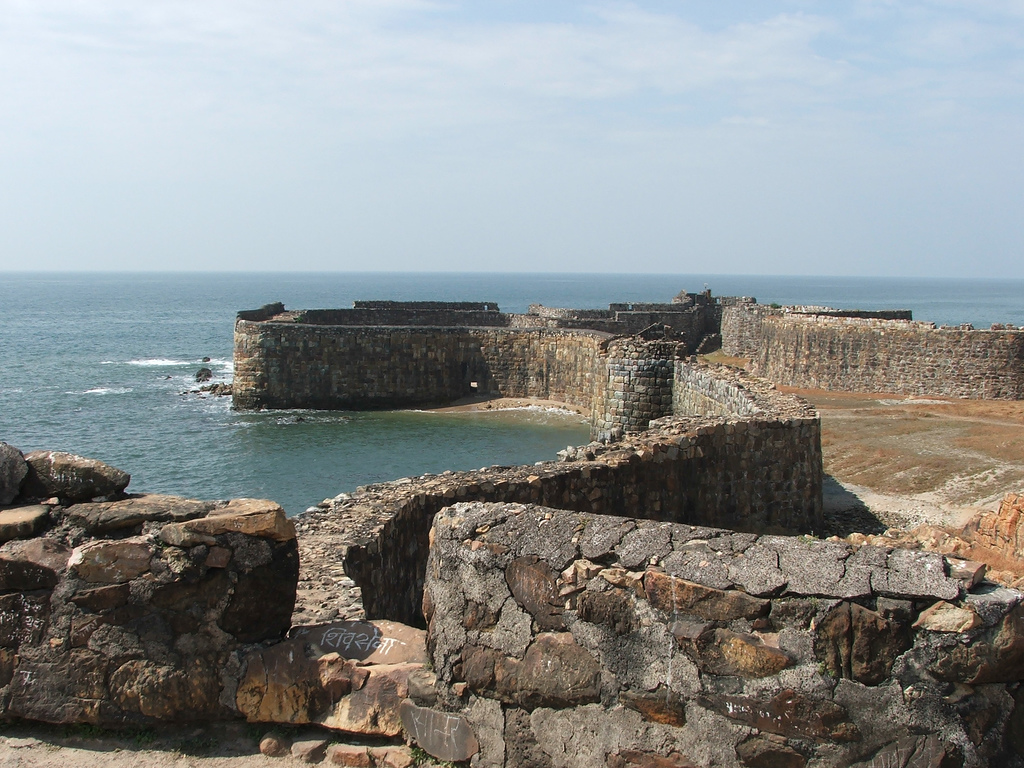
The Sindhudurg Fort near the Maharashtra-Goa border, one of the several naval fortifications built by the Maratha Navy

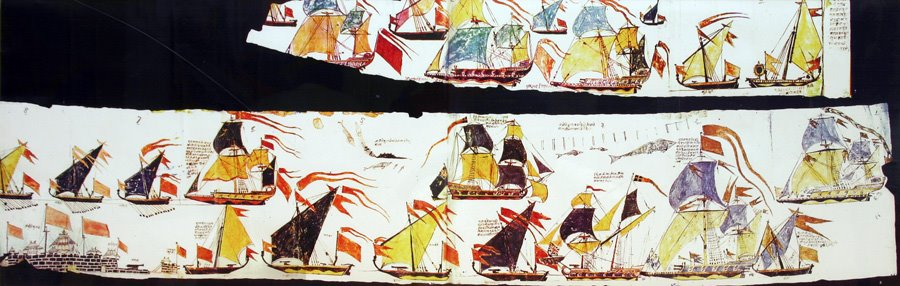
A painted scroll depicting different types of ships of the Marathan Navy, primarily grabs and gallivats, but also including some captured English ships.

Angre's career as a naval commander began in 1685 when the Killedar (fort commander) of Suvranadurg tried to defect to the Siddi of Janjira, an 18 year old Angre took control of the fort and captured the Killedar. When this news reached the Maratha ruler Chhatrapati Sambhaji Maharaj, he was pleased with Kanhoji's loyalty. As a result, Chhatrapati Sambhaji Maharaj made Kanhoji the Killedar (commander) of Suvarnadurg. After the death of Admiral Sidhoji Gujar around 1698, the Maratha Navy survived because of the extensive efforts of Kanhoji Angre. He was originally appointed as Sarkhel or Darya-Saranga (Admiral) by the chief of Satara in c. 1698. Under that authority, he was master of the Western coast of India from Mumbai to Vingoria (now Vengurla) in present-day state of Maharashtra, except for the property of the Muslim Siddis of Murud-Janjira who were affiliated with the Mughal Empire. Under his leadership, the activities of European trading companies were checked along the western coast of India. Kanhoji later swore allegiance to supreme Maratha ruler Chhatrapati Shahu and his prime minister Peshwa Balaji Vishwanath. He gained their support to develop naval facilities on the western coast of India, or Konkan. Angre was also placed as chief of 26 forts and fortified places of Maharashtra.

Kanhoji started his career by attacking merchant ships of European East India companies and slowly gained the enmity from all European powers in the region. In 1702, he captured an Indian merchant ship from Calicut with six English sailors onboard and took it to his harbor. In 1707, he attacked the British East Indiaman Bombay which blew up during the fight. In time, the Europeans thought that he could capture any merchant ship except large, heavily armed ships. When Maratha Chhatrapati Shahu ascended the leadership of the Maratha Empire, he appointed Balaji Viswanath Bhat as his Senakarta (Commander) and negotiated an agreement with Angre around 1707. This was partly to appease Angre who supported the other ruler, Tarabai, who claimed the Maratha throne. As per agreement, Angre became head of the Maratha Navy.

=== Naval strategy and resources ===
Under the leadership of Kanhoji, the Maratha developed a naval base at Vijayadurg featuring dockyard facilities for building vessels, mounting guns, and making the ships seaworthy. Their naval fleet consisted of ten gurabs/grabs (warship) and fifty gallivats (warboat). A gallivat had a displacement lower than 120 tons, while a grab could go as high as 400 tons. Another ship type used was the Pal (Maratha Man-of-war), which was a cannon-armed, three-masted vessel. The grabs had broadsides of 6 and 9-pounder guns, and carried two 9 or 12-pounders on their main decks. These guns pointed forward through port-holes cut in the bulkheads. The gallivats were mostly armed with light swivel guns, but some also mounted six or eight cannons, either 2 or 4-pounders. These boats were propelled by forty to fifty oars. Even during the reign of Kanhoji Angre, the Maratha Government signed a treaty of friendship with the Portuguese in 1703. As per the treaty, the Portuguese agreed to supply cannon and gunpowder to the Maratha, supplies which they needed as they had only a few cannon foundries producing their own armaments. The Marathas signed a treaty with the Siddi as well, thus concentrating all their naval forces to contest Indian waters with the Europeans. By the beginning of the 18th century, Kanhoji Angre controlled the entire coastline from Sawantwadi to Mumbai, which is the entire coastline of present-day Maharashtra. He built coastal fortifications on almost all creeks, cove, and harbours, such as a fortress or citadel with navigational facilities. The main naval bases were at Bankot, Anjanvel, Jaygad, Vijaydurg and Sindhudurg. Any ship sailing through Maratha territorial waters was to pay a levy called Chouth, which expressed Angre's dominance. To develop a strong navy Angre encouraged shipbuilding. Most of the vessels were built with teak grown near Bombay. Angre also encouraged cultivation of Teak on the western coast to ensure a supply of timber for the boats. to the Angre forces. He built ship building factories at Kolaba fort, Sakharkhadi, Suvarnadurg, and Vijaydurgh. The design of these ships and their durability had been of high quality. Kanhoji also utilized shipbuilding on modern European or more specifically English designs.

Between 1717 and 1720, the British East India Company (EIC) made at least two unsuccessful attempts to put an end to Maratha Navy attacks on their ships. In response to an EIC merchant ship being captured by Kanhoji's seamen, the British attempted to capture Vijayadurg and Khanderi, but were unsuccessful. In 1720, Angre captured the EIC vessel Charlotte along its owner, a merchant named Curgenven who had been bound for China from Surat. Curgenven would be imprisoned for 10 years.

==== Naval crew ====
Crew on Maratha belonged to diverse communities. They included seafaring indigenous communities such as Koli, Bhandari and Kharvi.

He also had Muslim staff. Since most of these people were illiterate, Angre employed Europeans, generally Dutch, to command his best vessels. He also employed a Jamaican pirate named James Plantain and entrusted him with significant responsibilities such as the chief gunner post. Angre employed Manuel de Castro, a Portuguese employee of the EIC who was about to be punished for his failure in capturing Khanderi Island, which was controlled by Kanhoji Angre.

==== Bases ====
- In 1698, Angre located his first base at Vijayadurg ('Victory Fort') (formerly Gheriah), Devgad Taluka, located about 485 km from Mumbai. The fort which was originally built by king Bhoj and strengthened by Maratha ruler Chhatrapati Shivaji Maharaj, is located on the coast and has an entrance hollowed out in it to accommodate entry of a vessel from the sea.
- Angre created an operating base from the fortified islands of "Kolaba" at Alibaug. Khanderi and Underi off the coast of Thal, Alibaug, and attempted to levy a tax on every merchant vessel entering the harbour.
- He established a township called Alibaug on seashore at southern tip of Mumbai. The main village at that time, was today's Ramnath. Kanhoji even issued his own currency in the form of a silver coin called the Alibagi rupaiya.
- In 1724, Angre built a port at Purnagad, located in Ratnagiri District, Maharashtra. Seven guns and 70 cannonballs were found in the port. The port was also used for limited trading activities.

== Campaigns ==
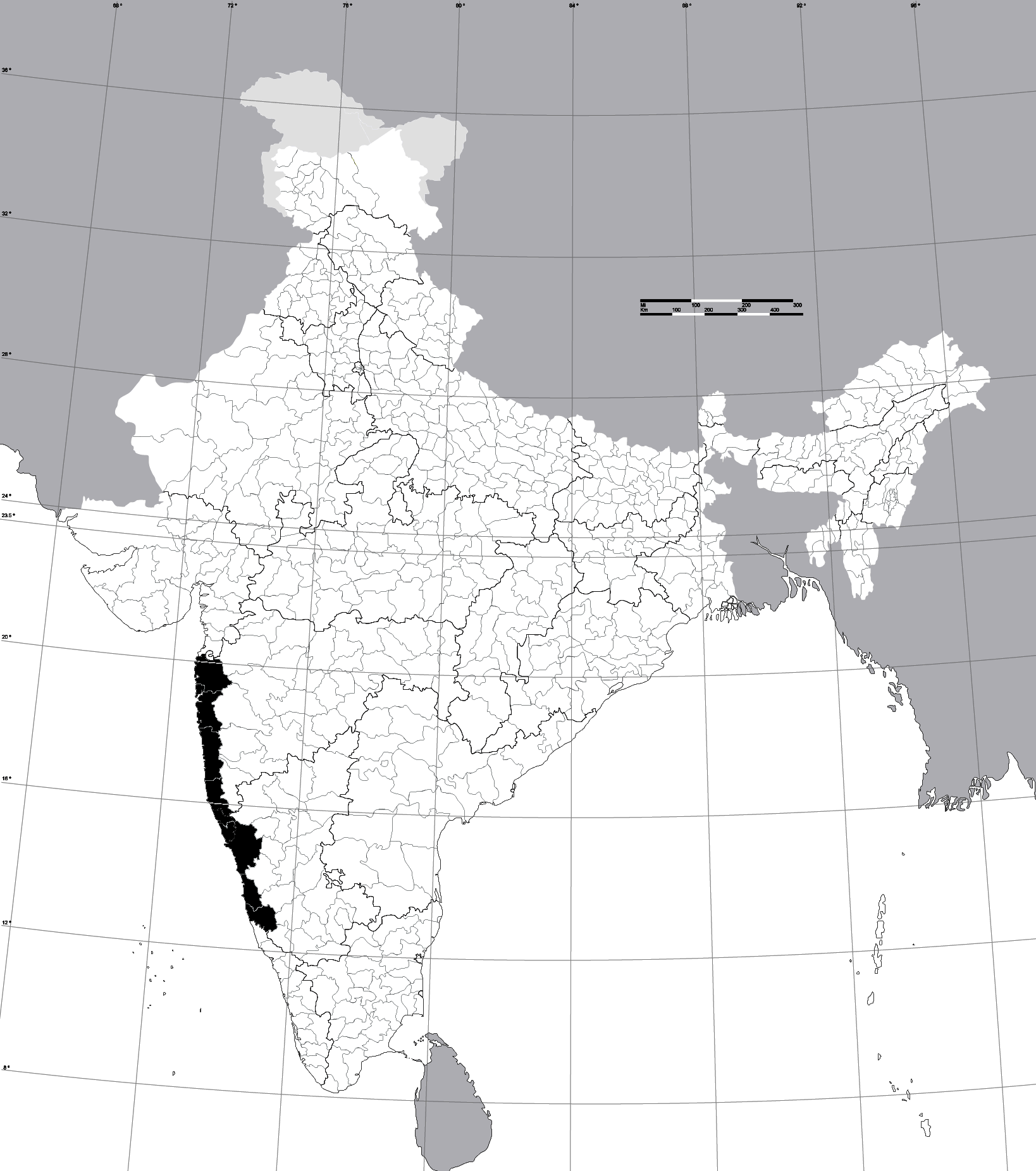
Kanhoji's controlled the northern coastline of the highlighted Konkan coastal area of India

Kanhoji intensified his attacks on European ships on the western coast of India. On 4 November 1712, his navy captured the British yacht Algerine, owned by the governor of Bombay, William Aislabie, killing the chief of their Karwar factory, Thomas Chown, and making his wife a prisoner, not releasing the captured yacht and Mrs. Chown until 13 February 1713 for 30,000 rupees. The release was done along with the return of previously captured territory, with Kanhoji hoping that the British East India Company would help him in his other wars, but later Angre made an alliance with Balaji Viswanath and continued fighting the EIC. He subsequently captured the British East Indiamen Somers and Grantham, near Goa as they were on a voyage from England to Bombay. In 1712, he disabled a thirty-gun Portuguese Navy frigate before captured it.

Angre eventually signed a treaty with Aislabie to stop harassing the EIC's merchant fleet. Aislabie would eventually return to England during October 1715.

After the arrival of Charles Boone as the new Governor of Bombay on 26 December 1715, Boone made several attempts to capture Angre. Instead of succeeding, in 1718 Angre captured three East India Company merchant ships, which refused to pay a ransom to Kanhoji, and ransoming their crews.

On 29 November 1721 a joint attempt by the Portuguese Viceroy Francisco José de Sampaio e Castro and British Governor Robert Cowan to capture Kanhoji proved unsuccessful. This force consisted of 6,000 Portuguese troops in four warships led by Commander Thomas Mathews. Aided by Maratha warriors including Mendhaji Bhatkar and his navy, Angre continued to harass and plunder the European ships. Matthews returned to England, where he was accused and convicted of trading with the Marathas in December 1723. Also, during 1723, Boone returned to Great Britain. After Boone's departure, relative calm prevailed between the British and Angre, until Angre's death in 1729.

== Battles ==
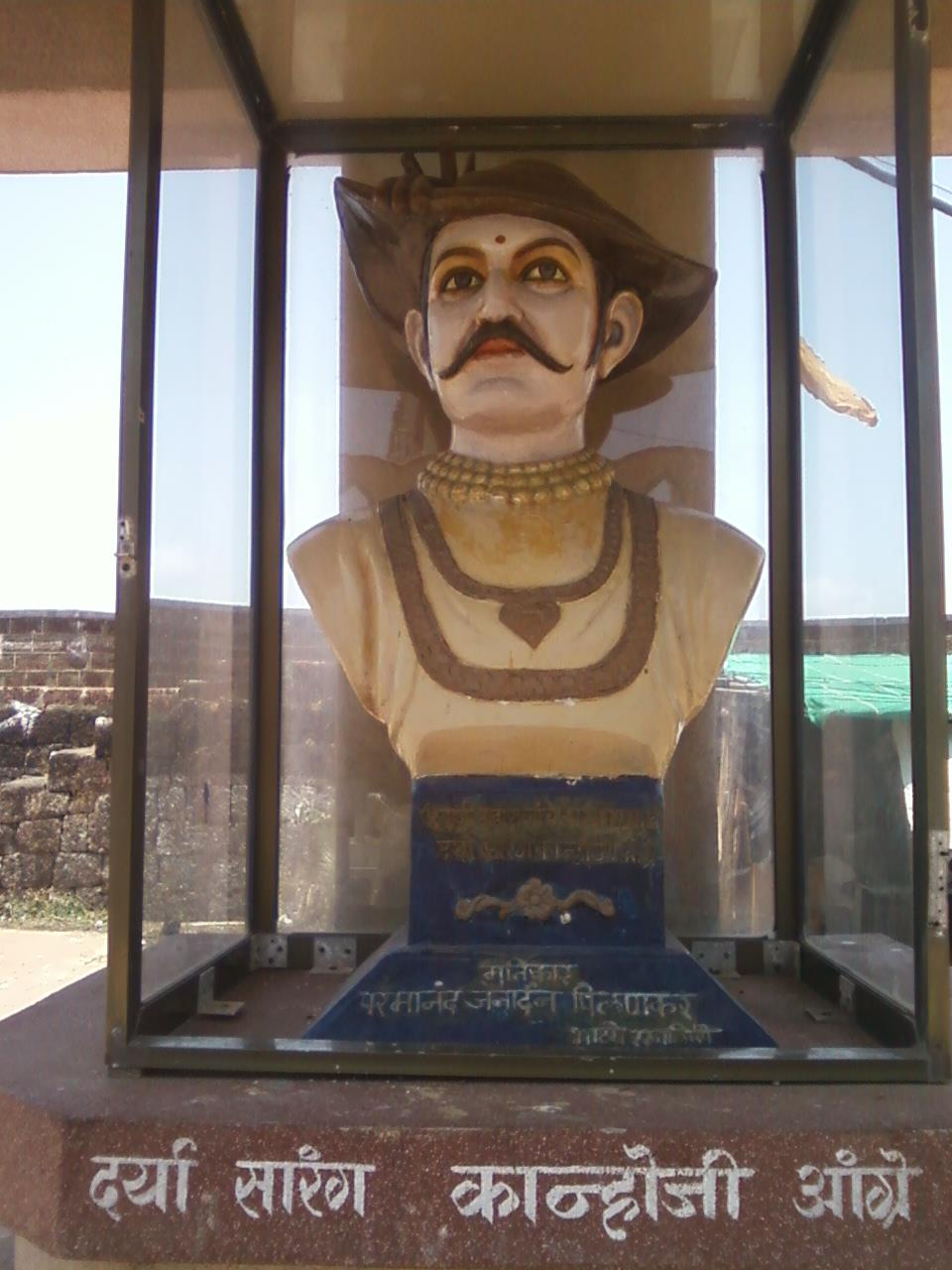
Sarkhel Kanhoji Angre, bust at Ratnadurg fort

- 1690 - Kanhoji Angre defeated combined forces of Siddis, Mughals, Portuguese and took Sagargad.
- 1707 – Attacked the East Indiaman Bombay which blew up during the fight.
- 1710 – Captures the Khanderi Islands near Bombard after fighting the East India Company ship Godolphin for two days.
- 1712 – Captured the EIC yacht Algerine, of the President of Bombay, William Aislabie, releasing it only after obtaining a jakat/tax of Rs. 30,000. (1713)
- 1717 - Kanhoji Angre captured the EIC ship Success and withstood a British attack on Vijaydurg Fort.
- 1718 - A British squadron attacked Khanderi, but were driven off with heavy loss.
- 1720 - Kanhoji repulsed a joint Anglo-Portuguese attack on Vijaydurg.
- 1722 - A second Anglo-Portuguese attack on Kolaba under admiral Thomas Mathews was repulsed.
- 1724 - A Dutch attack on Vijaydurg was repulsed by Kanhoji.
- He seized East Indiamen Somers and Grantham, near Goa as these vessels were on their voyage from England to Bombay.
- He disabled a thirty-gun man-of-war which was conveying Portuguese "armado" and captured it.

== Death and aftermath ==
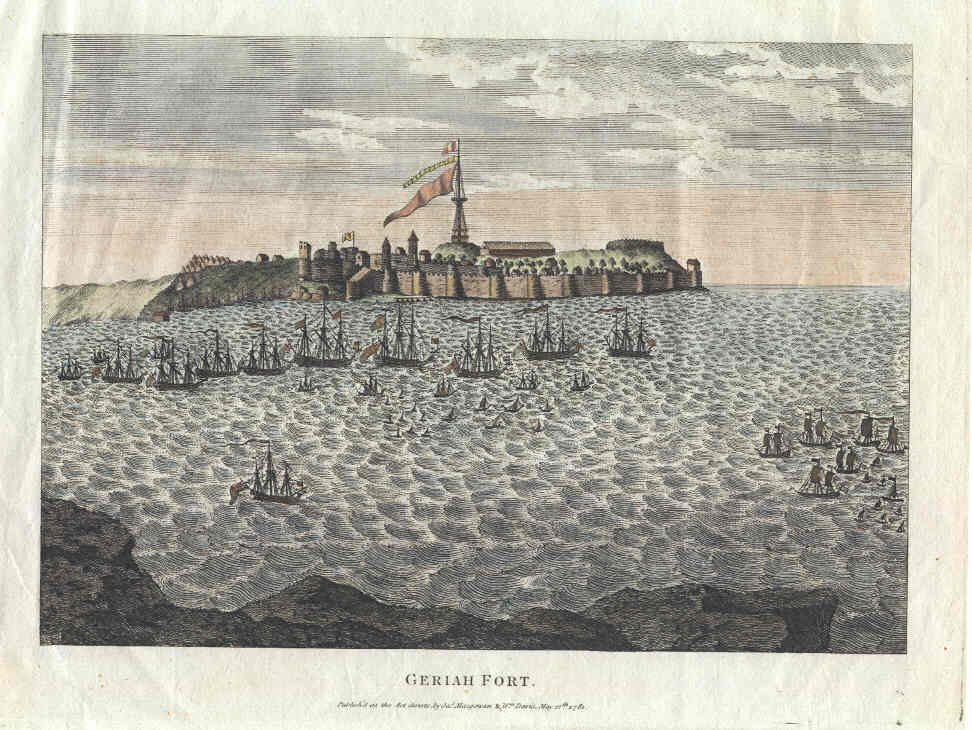
A British-Portuguese-Indian naval force attacks the fort of Geriah, 1756

By the time of his death on 4 July 1729, Kanhoji Angre had emerged as a master of the Arabian Sea from Surat to south Konkan. He left behind two legitimate sons, Sekhoji and Sambhaji; four illegitimate sons, Tulaji, Manaji, Yesaji and Dhondji. Angre's Samadhi (tomb) is situated at Shivaji Chowk, Alibag, Maharashtra.

After Kanhoji, his son Sekhoji continued Maratha exploits at sea till his death in 1733. After Sekhoji's death, Angre's holdings were split between two brothers, Sambhaji and Manaji, because of divisions in the family. With the Marathas neglecting naval concerns, the British soon found it easier to defeat the remnants of the kingdom. Angre and his sons' reign over the Western coast ended with the capture of Tulaji in a joint attack on the fort of Gheriah (now Vijaydurg) in February 1756 by the forces of the British East India Company and Maratha Peshwa Balaji Bajirao. The Peshwa's half brother Shamsher Bahadur commanded the Maratha forces.

== Seals of Kanhoji Angre ==
Three seals have been known to be used by Sarkhel Kanhoji Angre. One during the reign of Chhatrapati Rajaram, and two during the reign of Chhatrapati Shahu.

The three seals, along with their inscriptions and meaning are given below.

	Reigning Chhatrapati	Inscription	Meaning
Seal of Kanhoji Angre during Chhatrapati Rajaram Era	Chhatrapati Rajaram	॥श्री॥ राजाराम चरणी सादर तुकोजी सुत कान्होजी आंगरे निरंतर	Shri Kanhoji, son of Tukoji, Angre is forever present at the feet (service) of Rajaram.
	Chhatrapati Shahu	॥श्री॥ राजा शाहू चरणी तत्पर तुकोजी सुत कान्होजी आंगरे सरखेल निरंतर	Shri Kanhoji Angre Sarkhel, son of Tukoji, is forever eager at the feet (service) of Shahu.
Seal of Sarkhel Kanhoji Angre	Chhatrapati Shahu	॥श्री॥ श्री शाहू नृपती प्रि त्या तुकोजी तनुजन्म ना कान्होजी सरखे लस्य मुद्रा जय ति सर्वदा	Shri King Shahu's favoured, Tukoji's son, Sarkhel Kanhoji Angre's seal is always victorious.

== Legacy ==
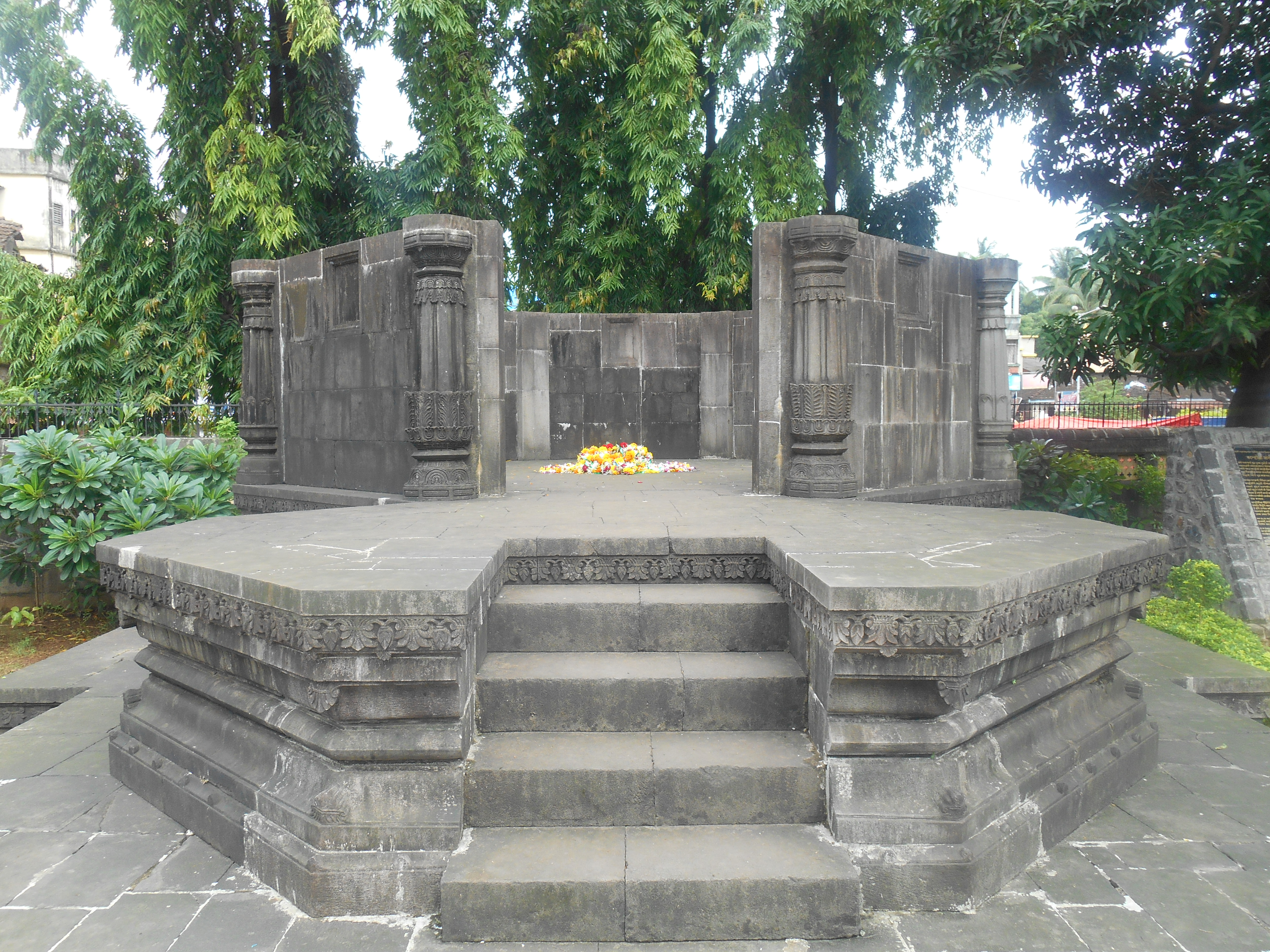
The Samadhi (mausoleum) of Kanhoji Angre at Alibag, Maharashtra.

Kanhoji Angre stands as one of the most notable admirals of the Maratha Navy who caused significant troubles to the European trading companies. Kanhoji is credited with the foresight that a Blue Water Navy's ultimate and strategic role is to keep the enemy engaged far from the shores of the homeland. At one time, Kanhoji was so successful that he attracted enterprising Europeans in his fleet as mercenaries, including one Dutchman, whom he appointed to the rank of Commodore. At the height of his power, Kanhoji commanded hundreds of warships and thousands of sailors at a time when the Royal Navy had little in the way of naval resources in far-away India that could significantly offset the growing strength of the Maratha Navy.

Kanhoji's harassment of British commercial interests and the English victory over the Portuguese at Swally led them to establish a small naval force that eventually became the modern Indian Navy. Today, a statue of Angre stands in Indian Naval Dockyard in Mumbai. While the original fort built by Angre that overlooked the Naval Docks has vanished, its boundary wall is still intact and within it lays the Headquarters of Indian Western Naval Command and is called INS Angre (Indian Naval Station Angre).

== The end of Angre family influences ==
The descendants of Angres continued to live in Kolaba till the 1840s and in 1843, the city was annexed to East India Company as per a despatch to Governor General of Bombay dated 30 December 1843.

=== Publication of family history ===
Chandrojirao Angre, a descendant of Kanhoji Angre, and his distant cousin, Jijabai Angre (later Parvatibai Puar, of Dewas Junior) supported the publication of History of the Angres in 1939 at Alibag Mumbai.

== Tributes ==
- Angria Bank, a submerged atoll structure located on the continental shelf 105 km west of the coast of Vijaydurg, Maharashtra, was named after Kanhoji Angre.
- The Western Naval command of the Indian Navy was named INS Angre on 15 September 1951 in honour of Kanhoji Angre. Other important naval offices are also located at INS Angre. His statue is erected at the old Bombay Castle located within the enclave located at the Naval Dockyard, South Mumbai.
- During April 1999, the Indian Postal Service released a Rupee 3 stamp showing a ghurab of Kanhoji Angre's fleet as depicted in a c. 1700 AD painting.
- The old Kennery Lighthouse, on Khanderi Island which marks the southern boundary of the Mumbai Port, was renamed as Kanhoji Angre Light House.
- The large residential colony of Rashtriya Chemicals & Fertilizers at Alibaug is named as " Sarkhel Kanhoji Angre Nagar".
- During the Malwani Jatrotsav festival in 1995 at Parel, Mumbai, a simulation of the naval battle between Angre and the East India Company fleet led by Charles Boon was conducted using remote-control wooden boats in an open tank (70' x 30'). Radio Controlled boats carved out of Teak wood and powered by high torque motors were constructed by Vivek S. Kambli and Vishesh S. Kambli. A thrilling soundtrack complemented this Audio Visual 3 Dimensional depiction of an important chapter from Maratha Naval history. The show lasted 10 days and was witnessed by thousands of Mumbai denizens.
- An all-weather port at Ratnagiri, Maharashtra, named as Angre port, was inaugurated on 24 April 2012 by 9th descendant of Kanhoji Angre.
- The 2007 Hollywood film Pirates of the Caribbean: At World's End portrays a character named Sri Sumbahjee, a purported reference to Sambhaji, Kanhoji Angre's son.
- Aniruddha Pimpalkhare of Pune built a 17 footer gaff rigged wooden boat in 2021 and named it SV Angré as a tribute to Sarkhel Angre. She is currently moored at Colaba, Mumbai in front of Gateway of India.

== See also ==
- Kunjali Marakkar
- Laya Patil
- Battle of Colachel
- British India
