= Vijaydurg Fort =

Fort located in Vijaydurg

- Sindhudurg District, Maharashtra, India
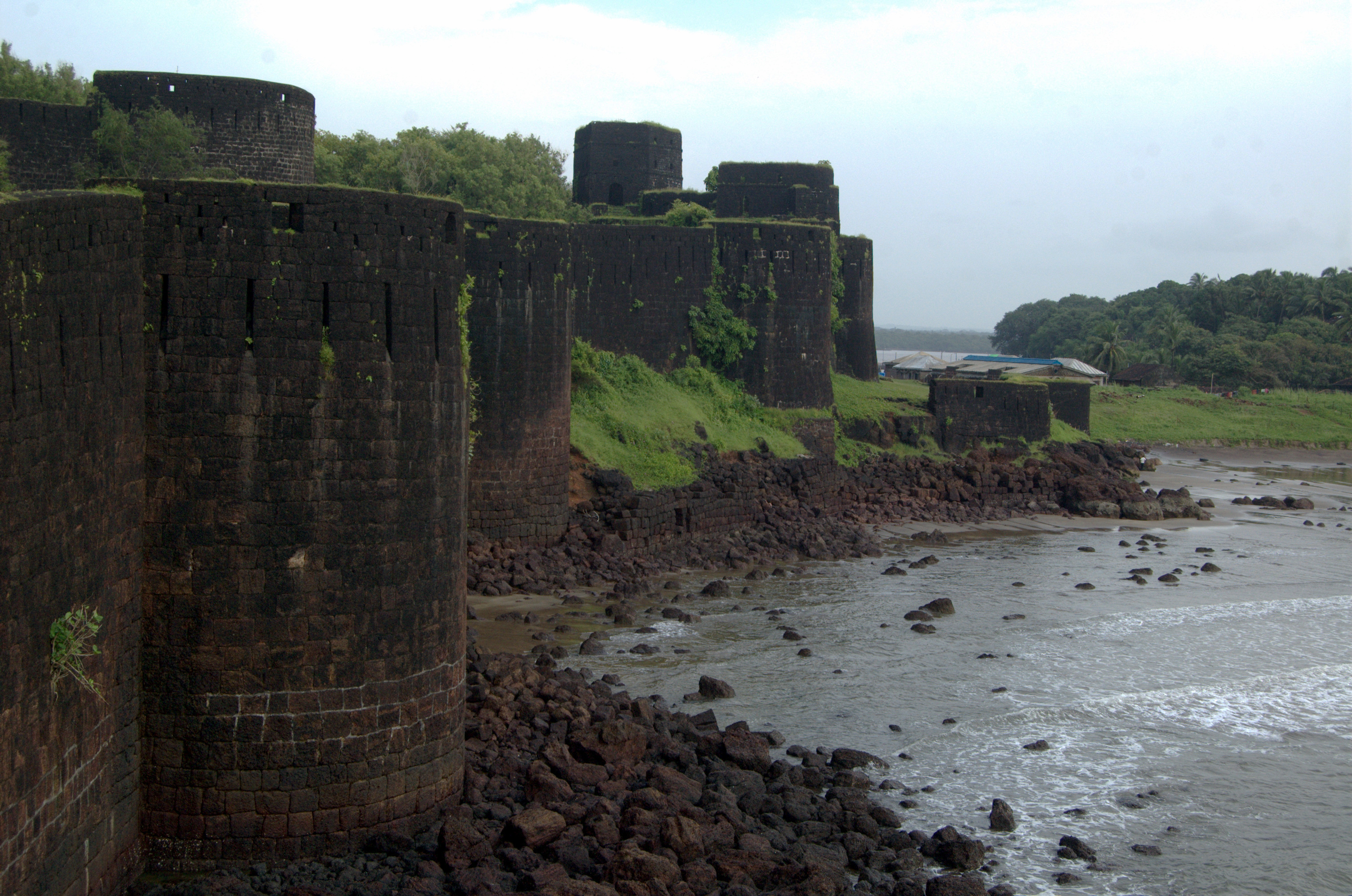
- Bastions of Vijaydurg fort

Site information
- Type: Sea fort
- Open to the public: Yes

Location
- Vijaydurg Fort shown within Maharashtra
- Location within Maharashtra
- Coordinates: 16.5607°N 73.3334°E

Site history
- Built: 1193
- Built by: Bhoja II
- Materials: Stone, Mortar

UNESCO World Heritage Site
- Part of: Maratha Military Landscapes of India
- Criteria: Cultural: iv, vi
- Reference: 1739-010
- Inscription: 2025 (47th Session)

Vijaydurg (sometimes written as Viziadurg), the oldest fort on the Sindhudurg coast, was constructed during the regime of Raja Bhoja II of the Shilahar dynasty (construction period 1193-1205) and restructured by Shivaji.

Earlier, the fort encompassed an area of 5 acres (20,000 m^{2}) and was surrounded by sea on all four sides. Over the years the eastern trench was reclaimed and a road constructed thereon. Presently the area of fort is about 17 acres (69,000 m^{2}) and is surrounded by the Arabian Sea on three sides. Shivaji extended the area of the fort by constructing three walls on the eastern side, each 36 metres high. He also constructed 20 bastions.

Vijaydurg Fort was called the "Eastern Gibraltar", as it was virtually impregnable. Its locational advantages include the 40 km long Waghotan/Kharepatan creek. Large vessels cannot enter the shallow water of this creek. Also, Maratha warships could be anchored in this creek and yet remain invisible from the sea. It is a protected monument.

== Etymology ==
The name Vijaydurg comes from two words, "Vijay" meaning victory and "Durg" meaning fort. The fort was earlier known as "Gheria", as it is situated close to the village of "Girye". Chhatrapati Shivaji Maharaj captured this fort from Adil Shah of Bijapur in 1653 and renamed it as "Vijay Durg" as the Hindu solar year's name was "Vijay" (Victory).

== Location ==
Vijaydurg fort is located at the tip of the peninsular region of Vijaydurg in Devgad Taluka, of district Sindhudurg. It is one of the several coastal forts on the western coast of Maharashtra, India. It is surrounded by water on all the four side but connected to the land through a narrow road. The port adjacent to the fort is a natural port and is still used by local fishermen.

== History ==
In 1653, Chatrapati Shivaji Maharaj captured this fort from Adil Shah of Bijapur and renamed it as "Vijay Durg". The original name of the fort was "Gheria" and the first fortification appears to have been constructed in 1200 during the regime of Raja Bhoj II. Chatrapati Shivaji Maharaj developed Vijaydurg as an important base for Maratha warships.

Maratha Empire looked to be in a decline after the death of chatrapati Shivaji Maharaj in 1680, when his son and successor Sambhaji was captured by Mughal Emperor Aurangzeb and brutally tortured to death on 21 March 1689. Later in that year, the fort of Raigad fell in the hand of Mughals. Wife of Shambhaji Maharaj and his infant son Shahu Maharaj along with many others were captured and were treated as state prisoners.

Shivaji Maharaj's second wife's son Raja Ram then took in charge of the Maratha Empire. Inspired by the valiant death of Shambhaji Maharaj, they fought back against the Mughals. It was during his reign Kanhoji Angre alias Conajee Angria became admiral of naval army of the Marathas. In 1698, Kanhoji made Vijaydurg the capital of his territory along the coast.

In 1700, Raja Ram died. Tara Bai, the brave widow of Raja Ram took over the control of the Maratha Empire. Putting her infant son on the Maratha throne styled as "Shivaji II", Tara Bai led successful operations against the Mughal from 1700 to 1707. Taking advantage of the discomfiture of Shivaji's ruling house Kanhoji Angre became the most "Powerful and independent Naval Chief of West coast of India". Tarabai gave Kanhoji title of Sarkhel (Admiral). At one time Kanhoji Angre was master of the whole coast from Bombay (Now Mumbai) to Vengurla.

The successors of Maratha Empire

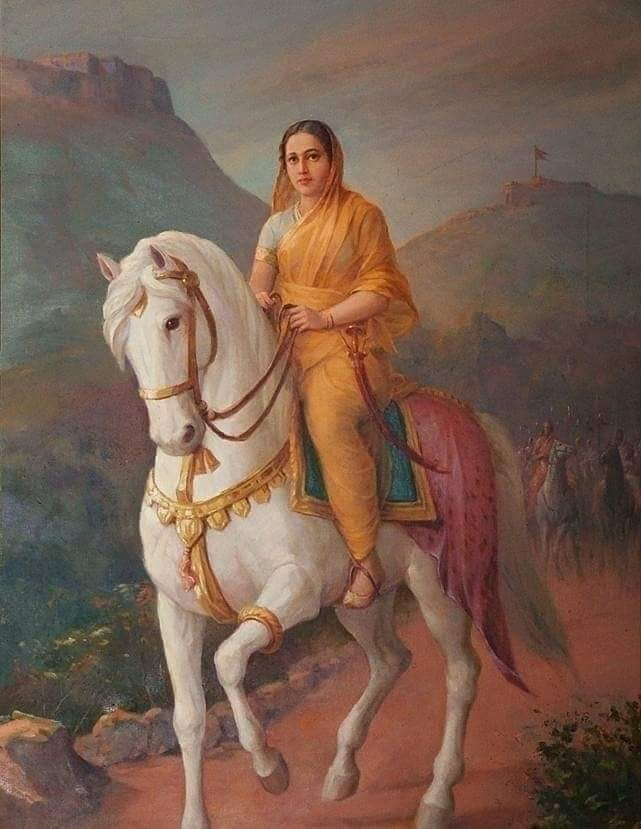
Maharani Tarabai lead the Marathas in the 27-year war with Mughals after death of her husband Rajaram

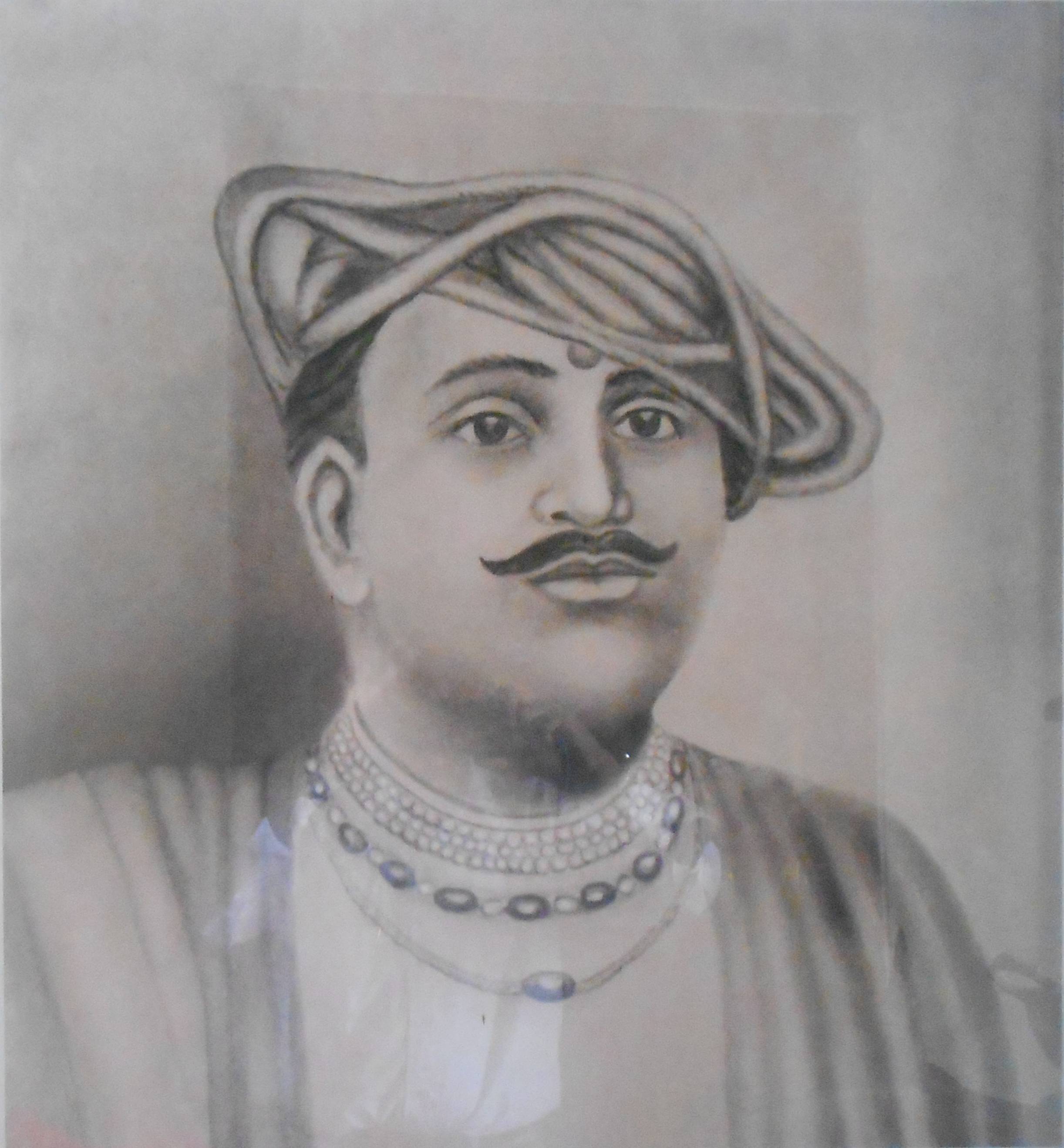
Sarkhel Kanhoji Angre. Admiral of Maratha Navy 1698–1729

Aurangzeb died in 1707 and Shahu was released from the clutches of Mughals. He challenged Tarabai and her son's legitimacy to the Maratha throne. The Marathas were divided but ultimately Shahu won the right to the throne as Chhatrapati and Tarabai was retreated to rule a small area of Kolhapur under the name of his son Shivaji II in 1713. She was later overthrown and imprisoned till her death by her husband's second wife Rajas Bai.

In the same year, Shahuji sent his Peshwa (Prime Minister), Balaji Vishwanath from his headquarters at Satara to negotiate with Kanhoji Angre. Kanhoji agreed to acknowledge allegiance to Satara and shift his loyalty from Tarabai. In return Kanhoji was confirmed command of the Maratha fleet, and granted twenty-six forts and fortified places with their dependent villages.

Vijaydurg is said to be the oldest fort in Sindhudurg coast. In the Pre-Independence era it was also known as "Eastern Gibraltar". This is because the fort was almost unconquerable. Under the leadership of Kanhoji Angre, it withstood many naval attacks by the British and the Dutch. Kanhoji Angre died on 4 July 1729 and the Angres control of the fort ended in 1756, after the Peshwa-British Alliance defeated the Angres clan. In 1818 Vijaydurg was completely in the hand of the British Empire.

== Battle of Vijaydurg ==
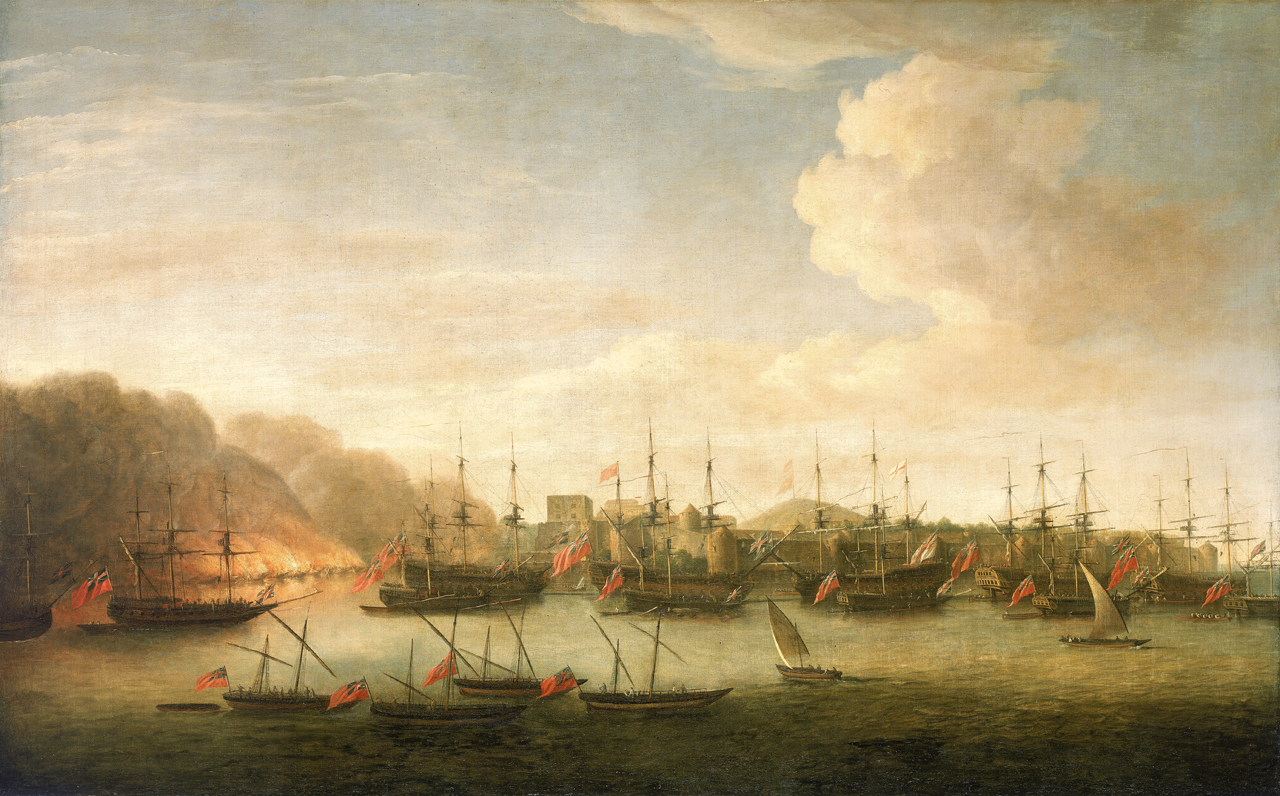
The Capture of Geriah, February 1756 – Dominic Serres, 1771

=== Attack on Vijaydurg ===
After the fall of Suvarnadurg and all other forts of the Angre, Vijaydurg was the only fort left under the command of Tulaji. In 1756, a large force under Admiral Watson converged on Vijaydurg. Watson had arrived at Bombay from eastern waters and had with him Colonel Clive with 500 marines. The English ships took station with Watson flying his flag on the Protector. Two bomb vessels were in the extreme east. The Maratha ships were anchored at the mouth of the creek, close to the fort. They all were bunched up, almost hull to hull. Amongst these was the Company's ship Restoration, which caught fire. The fire spread rapidly till the entire Angre fleet was destroyed, The bombardment of the fort had caused considerable damage inside the fort and magazine had been blown up.

=== Fall of Vijaydurg ===
Tulaji, meanwhile had left the fort and gone to the Peshwa's camp seeking a negotiation but was promptly arrested and sent to one of the inland forts as a prisoner. The garrison was asked to surrender and in the absence of any response Clive landed his marines on 11 February 1756, entered and captured the fort. A huge amount of booty was captured. 250 pieces of cannons, stores and ammunition, 100,000 Rupees and 30,000 in valuable items fell into English hands. Vijaydurg was not handed over immediately to the Peshwa as per the terms of the treaty. It was eventually given up but only after the Company obtained Bankot in exchange.

== Features of Architectural Interest ==
- According to unconfirmed reports, there is a 200 meter long, undersea tunnel from the fort to the palatial Dhulap house in the village. Supposedly, the roof of the tunnel has been pinched to protect it from landslides and it is also well ventilated. Now the tunnel is partially blocked. If the presence of the tunnel can be confirmed, and the tunnel cleared, it could serve as a tourist attraction of historical and architectural interest.
- Recent oceanographic evidence supports the existence of an undersea wall, constructed out at sea at a depth of 8–10 meter depth undersea. Made of laterite, the wall is estimated to be 122 meter long, 3 meter high & 7 meter broad. Attacking ships often met a watery grave after colliding against this wall. When the Siddhi of Janjira was going to attack Vijaydurg, he got a message from Portuguese telling him that they had lost 2 of their ships while they were nearing the fort.
- 1.5 km from the fort up the Waghotan Creek, exist the remains of a naval dock carved from rock. This is where Maratha warships were built and repaired. The ships built here were of the 400-500 tonnage capacity. This 109 meter long and 70 meter wide dock faces the north side and is an achievement of Maratha naval architecture. Most of the smaller ships used to be docked near this small inner port. The southern and eastern side is cut out of a natural rock and rest is dry masonry. In addition to this a number of grapnel and triangular stone anchors were noticed in the adjoining area of dockyard.
- On the other hill in front of the fort a wall was built to deceive the enemy. When the enemy attacked the wall, he had already wasted his ammunition and before he could understand, he would be attacked by Marathas from the rear side.
- The Archaeological Survey of India had undertaken restoration and repair works for Maratha forts in Maharashtra which included 'Vijaydurg Fort' along with Shivneri and Sindhudurg Fort.
- The fort has many monuments, now in ruins which show the characteristics of Maratha architecture. The food storage and court are such classic examples.
- This fort also has a Khalbatkhana, where important meetings were held. There are only 3 forts that had a Khalbatkhana. They are Rajgad, Raigad and 'Vijaydurg'.

== Culture ==
The Vijaydurg Fort features in Killa (The Fort), an Indian drama film directed by Avinash Arun. Killa's locations include Guhagar, the Vijaydurg Fort and Ganpatipule. The cycle race between Chinmay (the lead character) and his friends to the fort lends the movie its title.

Some of the locals claim that Sir Joseph Norman Lockyer, a British scientist was observing a solar eclipse from this fort on 18 August 1868. They claim that during his observation that the Helium Gas was discovered on Sun in the form of a yellow flame. The published reports on the discovery of helium report, that helium was discovered by two scientists independently in 1868. French astronomer Jules Janssen observed helium emission lines on 18 August 1868 as a bright yellow line during a total solar eclipse in Guntur, India.

On 20 October of the same year, English astronomer Norman Lockyer observed a yellow line in the solar spectrum. He took the observation in West Hampstead, United Kingdom. Norman Lockyer set up an observation post at the Vijaydurg Fort for the Solar eclipse of January 22, 1898. In his report he does not mention that he ever had been to the Fort before. On that occasion a platform was built.

Since 2009 World Helium Day is celebrated at the Vijaydurg Fort.

== See also ==
- Shri Dev Rameshwar Temple
- Rameshwar Wadi
- Pujare (Clan)
- Rameshwar Dockyard
- Vijaydurg Port
