= Pural =

- Village
- Location in Maharashtra, India
- Coordinates: 16°27′N 73°22′E
- Country: India
- State: Maharashtra
- District: Sindhudurg

Government
  - Body: Pural Gram Panchayat

Languages
  - Official: Marathi, Malvani
- Time zone: UTC+5:30 (IST)

Pural is a town in Devgad Taluka in Sindhudurg district of the state of Maharashtra, India. It is a small village on the west coast of Maharashtra.

== Transport ==
Pural is located 8 km off MH SH 115 which connects with NH 17 40 km away from the town. It is well connected to neighbouring towns and cities. MSRTC buses are available from all major towns as well as local buses that ply at regular intervals.

=== Driving Directions ===
From Mumbai: Distance - 422 km Time - 8 hours 26 minutes
From Pune: Distance - 359 km Time - 6 hours 07 minutes
From Kolhapur: Distance - 132 km Time - 2 hours 45 minutes,
From Panjim: Distance - 171 km Time - 3 hours 32 minutes

=== Local Transport ===
The local transport is motorised three-wheeler rickshaws. They are parked near the main bus stop and these are available without much bargaining.

=== Railways Stations ===
The nearest railway stations are:

- Rajapur Road Railway Station: 57 km, 1 hour 25 minutes
- Vaibhavwadi Road Railway Station: 58 km, 1 hour 15 minutes
- Nandgaon Road Railway Station: 58 km, 1 hour 15 minutes
- Kankavli Railway Station: 74 km, 1 hour 45 minutes

Local motorised three-wheeler rickshaws are available from all the above listed railway stations or one can hire private cars that are parked outside.

=== Airport ===
The nearest airport is Sindhudurg Airport, 73km away.

== See also ==
- Girye
- Rameshwar Wadi
- Vijaydurg (city)
- Shri Dev Rameshwar Temple
- Vijaydurg Fort
