= Shri Aday Durgay Temple =

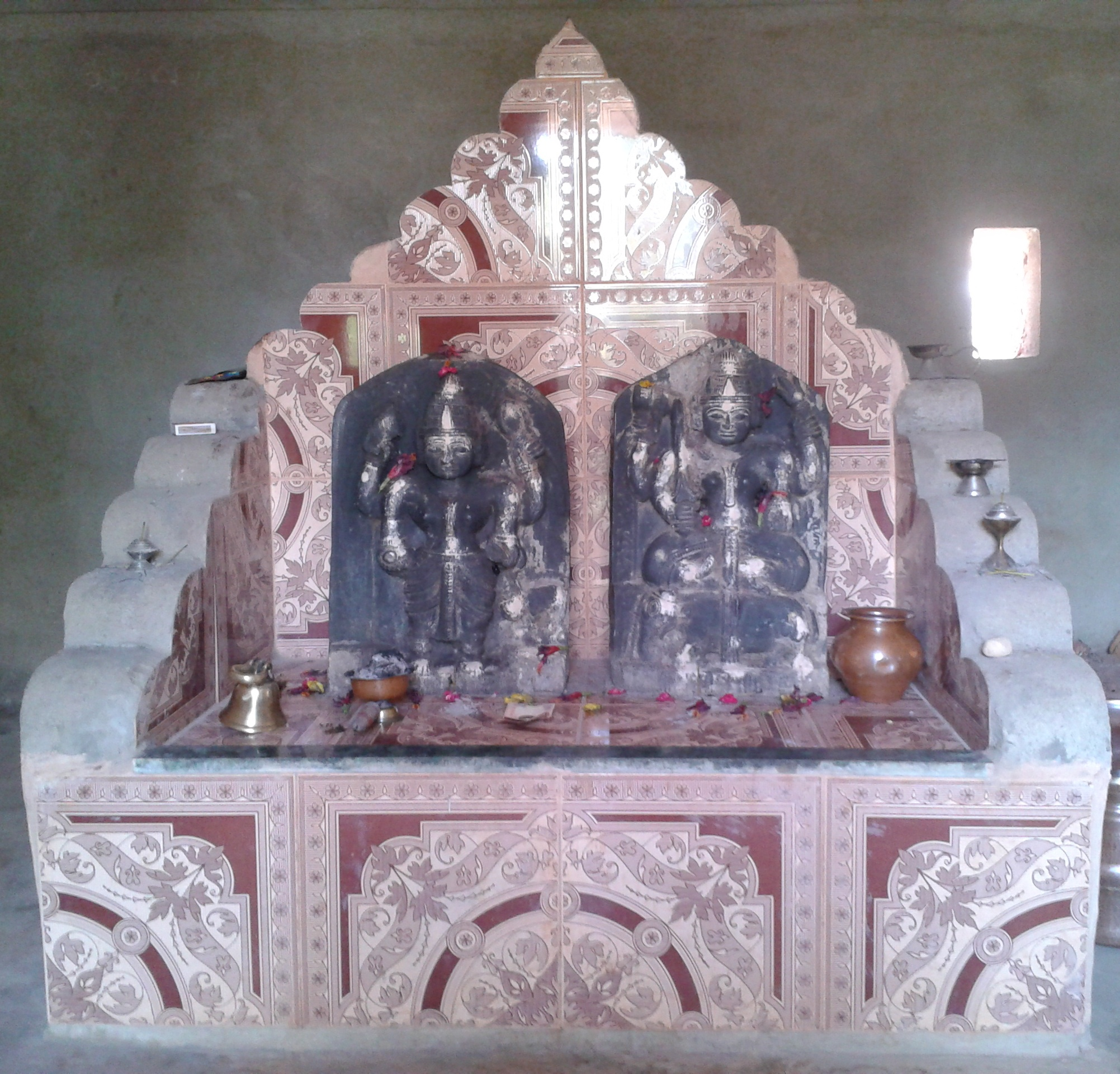
Shri Aday Durgay – Idols

Shri Aday Durgay Temple is located near village Rameshwar in Devgad taluka of Sindhudurg District, Maharashtra, India. This temple is dedicated to two Hindu goddesses Aday and Durgay. It is a historic temple that was built even before the 15th century, dedicated to the Clan Goddess or Kuladevata of the Pujare.

== Location ==
The temple is located in a forest near MSH 115. Devotees have to walk for about 15–20 minutes to reach the temple from the state highway. The only access to the temple is a small stone pathway through the forest land. There are a few mango plantations around the temple premises which are owned by the local people including some Pujare.

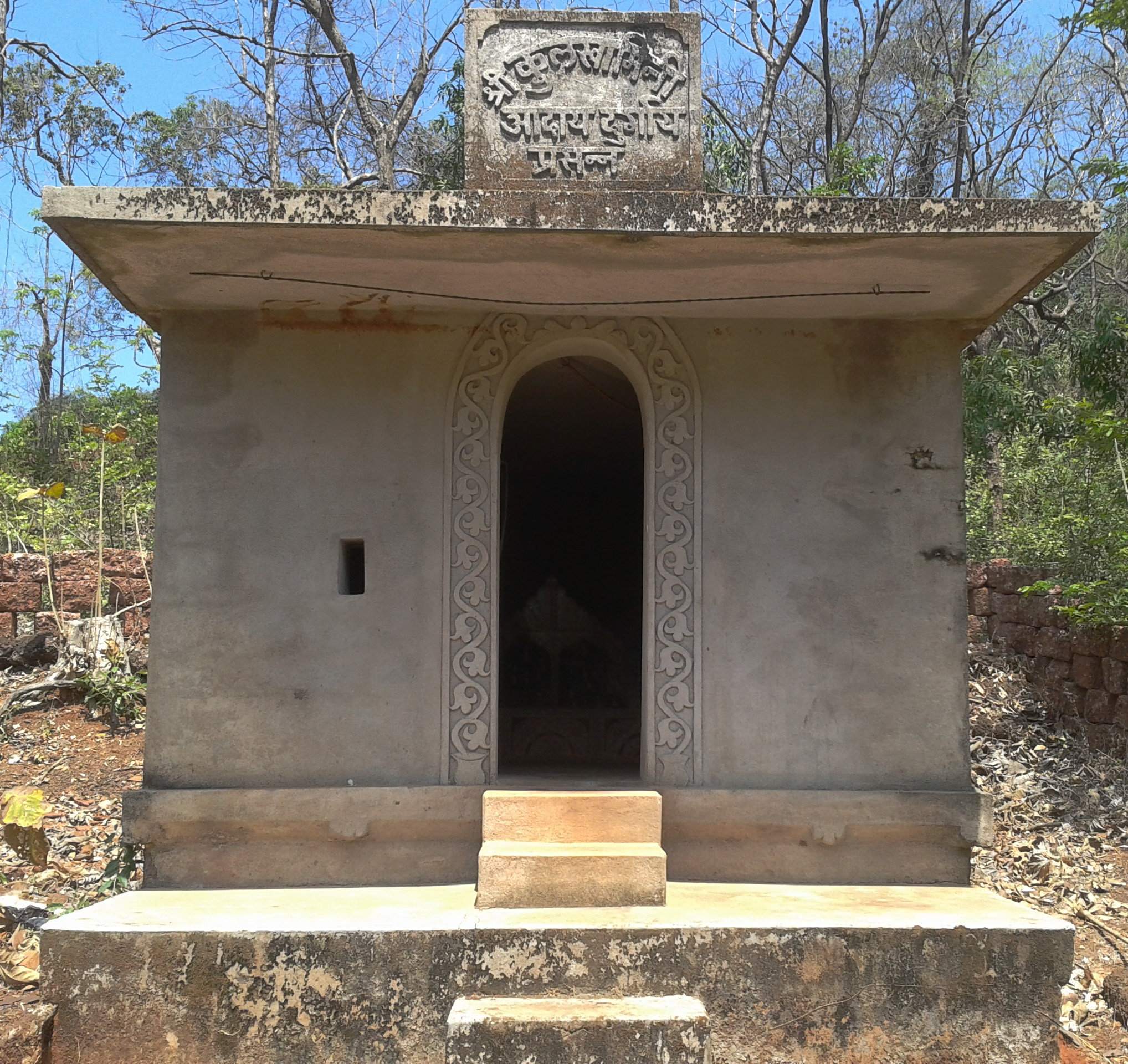
Shri Aday Durgay Temple Building

== Architecture ==
The temple building is very simple in appearance. It consists of a small room elevated to a height of 4 feet. The entire temple building is only 10 feet high. The main entrance faces east. Unlike other temples in the region, this temple does not have a wooden door. The temple is open to devotees all the time. According to the traditions prevalent in the region, only male members of the clan are allowed to visit the temple. The temple is being renovated through donations from the Pujare of Rameshwar.

== Administration ==
The chief priest of the temple is a member of the Pujare Clan residing in nearby settlements. This settlement has been there as long as the temple itself. The temple rituals are carried out by the Pujare priests. They are responsible for performing all the temple rituals, including Puja and Aarti, as well as taking care of the murtis.

== Gallery ==
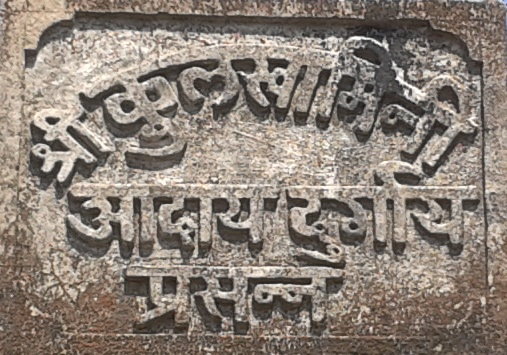
Temple Name Carved on Stone

== See also ==
- Pujare Clan
- Shri Dev Rameshwar Temple
- Rameshwar Wadi
- Rameshwar Dockyard
