= Pujare =

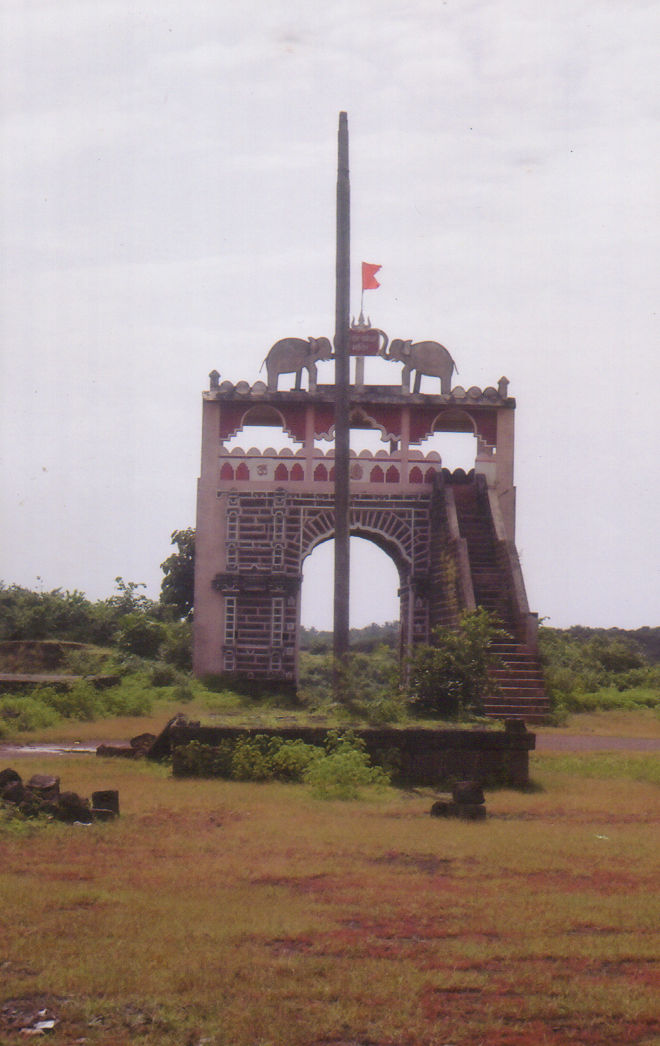
Landmark of Rameshwar Wadi - Majority of Pujare are inhabitants of this town

Pujare, also known as Pujar, Pujara or Pujari, traditionally belonged to the priestly class of the Maratha community. They are the original inhabitants of Rameshwar in Devgad Taluka of Sindhudurg District in Maharashtra, India.

Their oldest settlement is in Rameshwar also known as Rameshwar Wadi which is a small village located on the coast of Sindhudurg District of Maharashtra on the west coast of India. This settlement has been dated back to the 16th century or before. Within the boundaries of this village, a 16th-century Shri Dev Rameshwar Temple is located, which is dedicated to the Hindu deity Shiva. The temple rituals of Shri Dev Rameshwar Temple are performed by the Pujare. They are responsible for performing all the temple rituals, including Puja and Aarti, as well as taking care of the shivling and murtis. The Pujare act as counselors during Shri Dev Rameshwar festivities and festivals. They have a reputation for being learned and conduct prayer services for Lord Shiva.

Rameshwar is also known for its Alphonso mangoes. Apart from being the priests of the temple, Pujare also own Alphonso mangoes plantation in and around the region. These are few of the age-old plantations in the Konkan region that are being passed on from generations since the 17th century. As per historical records, as far as 9 generations have been known to be recorded in the region.

== Other Settlements ==
Rameshwar Wadi is the central settlement for Pujare as Shri Dev Rameshwar Temple is located in this village. However, there are large Pujare population in settlements within the Rameshwar Region as well as the surrounding areas. Some of the settlements include Kolwadi, Katye, Hurshi, Padel, Girye, Pural, Nadan and Tirlot.

== Ancestry ==
Pujare Clan - Ancestry (15th Century to present)

The oldest records of the Pujare Clan shows Gond Pujara as the father of today's Pujare. the ancestry chart shows 15th Century records which continues right up to today's living Pujare clan members. This clan is not to be mistaken for Poojary of the Karnataka.
