= Rameshwar (disambiguation) =

Rameshwar may refer to:

== People ==
- Rameshwar, a list of people with the given name

== Places ==
- Madhav Govind Rameshwar Temple, a temple in Agapur (Agasthipur) village, Ponda taluk, Goa, India
- Rameshwar Deula, a temple in Bhubaneswar, Odisha, India
- Rameshwar Dockyard, a small tidal dockyard located on the west bank of Waghotan River in Sindhudurg District, Maharashtra, India
- Rameshwar Mahadev Temple, a temple in Akoda, Bundi district, Rajasthan, India
- Rameshwar Nagar railway station, a railway station on Muzaffarpur–Gorakhpur main line in Lachhnauta, West Champaran district, Bihar, India
- Rameshwar Wadi, a small town in Sindhudurg District, Maharashtra, India
- Shri Dev Rameshwar Temple, a temple in Rameshwar Wadi in Devgad taluka of Sindhudurg District, Maharashtra, India
