= Vijaydurg Port =

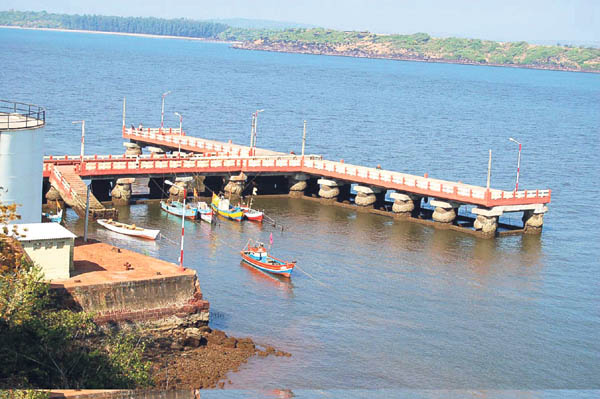
- Vijaydurg Port
- Interactive map of Vijaydurg Port

Location
- Country: India
- Location: Devgad, Vijaydurg
- Coordinates: 16.556194°N 73.338028°E

Details
- Operated by: Maharashtra Maritime Board
- Owned by: Government of Maharashtra
- Type of Harbor: Minor
- No. of wharfs: 2

Statistics
- Annual cargo tonnage: 200 tonnes

Vijaydurg Port is a natural harbour on the west coast of the district of Sindhudurg in Maharashtra, India. The port is situated midway between Malvan and Ratnagiri at the mouth of the Vijaydurg creek in Devgad taluka. Its coastal jurisdiction extends 10 km north up to the Jaitapur lighthouse. Goods weighing about 200 tons are generally loaded or unloaded at the port daily. The cargo brought by sea is transported by creek up to Kharepatan which is 26 miles up from Vijayadurg.

== Administration ==
Vijaydurg Port is one of the operational minor (non-major) ports handling cargo under Maharashtra Maritime Board (MMB). This port is categorized under Vengurla group of ports under Maharashtra Maritime Board. The controlling authority of this port is "Assistant Range Officer".

== Commodities ==
The chief commodities imported in this port are food-stuffs, pulses, salt, oil-cakes, sugar, cement and dry fish. The chief commodities exported from this port are; mangoes, jungle-wood, hemp, bamboos and coconuts.

Food and related products as well as general merchandise are imported from Mumbai, salt from Mora and Karanja, tiles from Mangalore and salted fish from Malvan and Karwar. Mangoes, wood and salted fish are sent to Mumbai.

== Trade ==
The average turn-over of import and export at the port during 1953-58 was about 25,000 tons and about 25,000 passengers travel through the port every year. An old anchor (length 13m, breadth 8m and road circumference 2m), belonging to the Maratha Navy was found lying in water near the port for over hundred years and still in good condition. It was moved to the Maritime Museum, Mumbai, from the port at the request of Captain J. R. Davis, Nautical Adviser to the Government of India, on 5 February 1956.

== Ferries ==
The region surrounding Vijaydurg Port has a good network of rivers and rivulets. There are many interruptions to road traffic due to the absence of bridges over the numerous rivers, rivulets and creeks. Many ferries ply only after monsoon as the swelling waters begin to recede as the month of October advances. The ferries ply between Vijaydurg and Kharepatan which is 40 km towards the eastern side of Waghotan River.

Almost all the ferries are country crafts manned by two or three ferrymen. Small boats called Hodis ply across rivers and rivulets. The sailing vessels plying across creeks are called machwas. A hodi can accommodate four persons, while a machwa can carry up to fifty persons.

The statistics regarding the number of passengers embarked and disembarked at this port for six years (1951 to 1957) are given in the table below:

| Year | 1951-52 | 1952-53 | 1953-54 | 1954-55 | 1955-56 | 1956-57 |
|---|---|---|---|---|---|---|
| Embarking | 22,900 | 25,373 | 23,258 | 27,538 | 20,728 | 28,505 |
| Disembarking | 23,731 | 24,693 | 23,532 | 25,428 | 25,051 | 27,507 |

== Konkan Steamer Service ==
Until 1983, Vijaydurg was a port of call for the Konkan Steamer service, which ran two ships: Konkan Sevak and Konkan Shakti, which were later sent to supply the IPKF (Indian Peace Keeping Forces) in Sri Lanka in the late 1980s on the behest of late Prime Minister of India, Rajiv Gandhi. In the past, a few operators like Damania did launch catamaran services, but they never really took off. The smaller catamarans that replaced them in the mid-nineties were described as "soulless" by many a traveller. 'The sea route on board the catamarans could never be a pleasant experience for the passengers due to the heavy rolling and pitching effects of the sea throughout the entire journey,' states the proposal passed by the state government.

=== Relaunch of Mumbai-Goa Liner ===
Twenty-two years after its last voyage the Mumbai-Goa steamer service will set sail once again, with Goa Chief Minister Manohar Parrikar and his Maharashtra counterpart Prithviraj Chauhan keen on relaunching the service.

A proposal to restart the service was made by the Goa Government in the last week of May, and was promptly seconded by the Maharashtra Government. "It has been cleared and the service will be launched in the next three months," Captain of Ports, Goa, James Braganza. The service will be purely an alternative mode of transport between Mumbai and Goa, minus any frills, but comfortable. As earlier, the service is expected to operate between Ferry Wharf (Bhaucha Dhakka) in Mazgaon and Panaji port. En route it will halt at Raigad, Ratnagiri, Jaigad, Vijaydurg, Malvan and Vengurla, where smaller boats will ferry passengers to the shore. There is much scope for a daily steamer services on the route, as trains invariably run full and buses are not preferred by many.

== Construction of a new Minor Port ==
Maharashtra Maritime Board has proposed the construction of a modern and all weather port at Vijaydurg in Sindhudurg District, Maharashtra. The estimated investment in the project is Rs. 5000.0 Million (USD 100.0 million).

=== Project Description ===
Maharashtra has a long coastline which could be effectively developed for carrying out inland water transport for goods and passengers. Maharashtra Maritime Board has identified development of a minor port at Vijaydurg in Sindhudurg District. The proposed port will be located at southern portion of Burmana bay near the mouth of Wagothane River. As per a study carried out by Consulting Engineering Services (CES), the traffic projections are in the region of 2.0 mtpa and 2.5 mtpa for the years 2005 and 2010, respectively. The traffic composition will be of general cargo with or without containers.

| Operating Agency | Maharashtra Maritime Board |
|---|---|
| Gestation Period | The project will be completed in a period of 3 to 5 years. |
| Revenue Generation | The project is expected to earn revenues by way of port operations. |
| Status of the Project | Planning stage. |

=== Project Benefits ===
- To facilitate inland movement of cargo and passengers.

=== Status of government clearances needed for successful implementation of the project ===
| No. | List of the clearances needed | Status |
|---|---|---|
| 1. | Environmental clearance | To be obtained by the entrepreneur |
| 2. | Availability of land for the project | Will be provided by GOM on lease by charging a nominal lease rental. |

=== Location ===
The site lies in Sindhudurg district at about 60 km from Kokisare Railway station and 55 km from NH-17. Presently, there is one jetty (51m* 6.6 m) with maximum permissible draft of 3.0 m. Bore logs available indicate soft clay for a depth of 3 to 6 m below sea bed at proposed harbour basin and channel, which is underlain by moderate to completely weathered basalt layer and hard rock.

=== Proposed implementation plan ===
The project implementation schedule begins with selection of the agency (Licensee) which will undertake construction of facilities on "Build, Own, Operate & Transfer" basis. The licensee will have to complete the survey of the project site, carry out detailed soil & other investigations followed by detailed engineering, selection of agencies to construct the port before commencing construction. Considering the variety & volume of work involved in creation of the Port, it is suggested that total works be divided into several packages for execution as indicated below:

- Breakwater
- Jetties
- Dredging
- Tugs & navigational Aids
- Electrical Facilities
- Roads

The construction, repair, maintenance and management of the port will be the sole responsibility of the developer.

== Satellite Port ==
State-run Jawaharlal Nehru Port Trust (JNPT), India’s busiest container gateway near Mumbai, is planning to build a satellite port at either Vijaydurg or Dahanu in Maharashtra for at least Rs.10,000 crore. JNPT and the Maharashtra government will hold 75% and 25% respectively in the proposed project, according to port chairman N.N. Kumar, in an interview. At both Vijaydurg and Dahanu, there is natural draught of 20 metres to receive bigger ships. A feasibility study for a satellite port has been completed internally. At present, there is only one big port in Maharashtra - JNPT, despite the fact that there is large industrial growth taking place in the state. The project's time frame has not been disclosed.

== Gallery ==
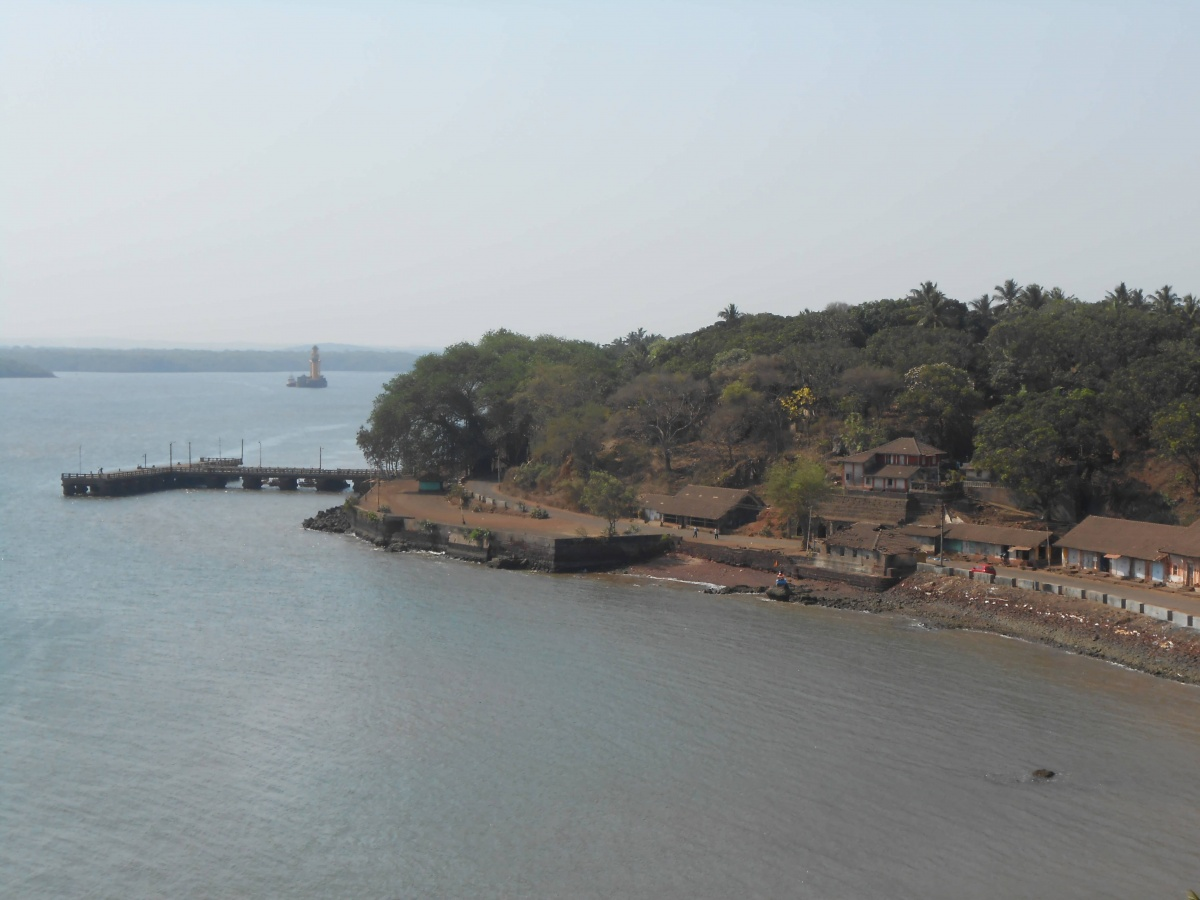

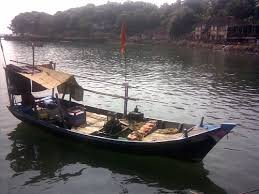
Machwa

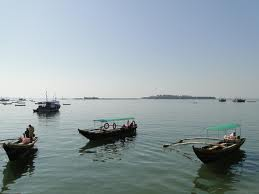
Hodi

== See also ==
- Vijaydurg
- Vijaydurg Fort
- Rameshwar Wadi
- Shri Dev Rameshwar Temple
- Rameshwar Dockyard
