= Gheriah =

Gheriah may refer to:

- Girye (village)
- Vijaydurg (city)
- Vijaydurg fort
