= Marathwada Kesar mango =

Mango cultivar from Maharashtra, India

Mangifera 'Marathwada Kesar'
- Genus: Mangifera
- Species: Mangifera indica
- Cultivar: 'Marathwada Kesar Mango'
- Origin: India

The 'Marathwada Kesar mango', is a mango cultivar primarily grown in Marathwada region of Maharashtra, India. Districts where they are primarily grown are Chhatrapati Sambhaji Nagar, Jalna, Beed and Latur.

== Name ==
The word "Marathwada" relates to the region, where it is grown while "Kesar" translates to "Saffron" in the Hindi language & Marathi language.

== Description ==
Marathwada Kesar mango, named for its saffron-like color and flavor, has the highest soluble solids content among Indian mango varieties.

== Geographical indication ==
It was awarded the Geographical Indication (GI) status tag from the Geographical Indications Registry under the Union Government of India on 30 November 2016 (valid until 29 September 2034).

Mango Growers Association, from Chhatrapati Sambhaji Nagar proposed the GI registration of the Marathwada Kesar Mango mango. After filing the application in 2016, the fruit was granted the GI tag in 2016 by the Geographical Indication Registry in Chennai, making the name "Marathwada Kesar Mango" exclusive to the mangoes grown in the region. It thus became the first mango variety in Maharashtra (before Alphonso mango) to earn the GI tag.

== See also ==
- List of mango cultivars
- List of Geographical Indications in India
