= Girye =

- Village
- Location in Maharashtra, India
- Coordinates: 16°56′N 73°22′E
- Country: India
- State: Maharashtra
- District: Sindhudurg

Government
  - Body: Girye Gram Panchayat

Languages
  - Official: Marathi, Malvani
- Time zone: UTC+5:30 (IST)
- PIN: 416806
- Telephone code: 02364
- Vehicle registration: MH-07

Girye is a small village in Devgad Taluka in Sindhudurg district of the Indian state of Maharashtra. It is located on the west coast of Maharashtra.

== Transport ==
Girye is located on MH SH 115 which connects with NH 17 that lies 45 km from the town. It is well connected to neighbouring towns and cities. MSRTC buses are available from all major towns as well as local buses that ply at regular intervals.

=== Driving Directions ===
From Mumbai: Distance - 408 km Time - 8 hours 30 minutes
From Pune: Distance - 367 km Time - 6 hours 22 minutes
From Kolhapur: Distance - 138 km Time - 2 hours 51 minutes

=== Local Transport ===
The local transport is motorised three-wheeler rickshaws. They are parked near the main bus stop and are available without much bargaining.

=== Railways Stations ===
Nearest railways stations are:

- Rajapur Road Railway Station: 57 km, 1 hour 25 minutes
- Vaibhavwadi Road Railway Station: 58 km, 1 hour 15 minutes
- Nandgaon Road Railway Station: 58 km, 1 hour 15 minutes
- Kankavli Railway Station: 74 km, 1 hour 45 minutes

Local motorised three-wheeler rickshaws are available from all the above listed railway stations or one can hire private cars that are parked outside.

== Places of interest ==
- Shri Devi Chaudeshwari Temple
- Girye Windmills
- Kotharwadi Beach
- Shri Dev Rameshwar Temple
- Rameshwar Beach
- Hatti Mahal
- Sambhaji Angre Samadhi
- Shri Ganesh Mandir, Rameshwar Wadi
- Shri Aday Durgay Temple
- Green Earth Eco-Park, Rameshwar
- Vijaydurg Fort
- Vijaydurg Beach
- Vijaydurg Port
- Konkan Krishi Vidyapith's Mango Research Institute, Rameshwar

== Girye Ultra Mega Power Project ==
Girye was the proposed site for Girye Ultra Mega Power Project proposed by the government of India as part of a strategy to add an additional 100,000 megawatts of generation capacity by 2017. In 2007 the Hindustan Times reported that the site for the project was selected after the Central Electricity Commission carried out a detailed feasibility study and gave its go-ahead completely overlooking sensitivities of local alphonso growers. Alphonso is another name for a variety of mango specifically grown in this area. The newspaper reported that the 3,000-acre piece of land originally earmarked for the project spreads over four villages with a population of about 4,000. The project was opposed by a determined group of alphonso mango farmers who refused to yield even an inch of their land for the project as there is no alternative land available for alphonso farming. Due to local agitation in 2013 the project was reported as deferred and shelved.
