= Vijaydurg (town) =

Human settlement in India

Coordinates: 16°34′N 73°20′E

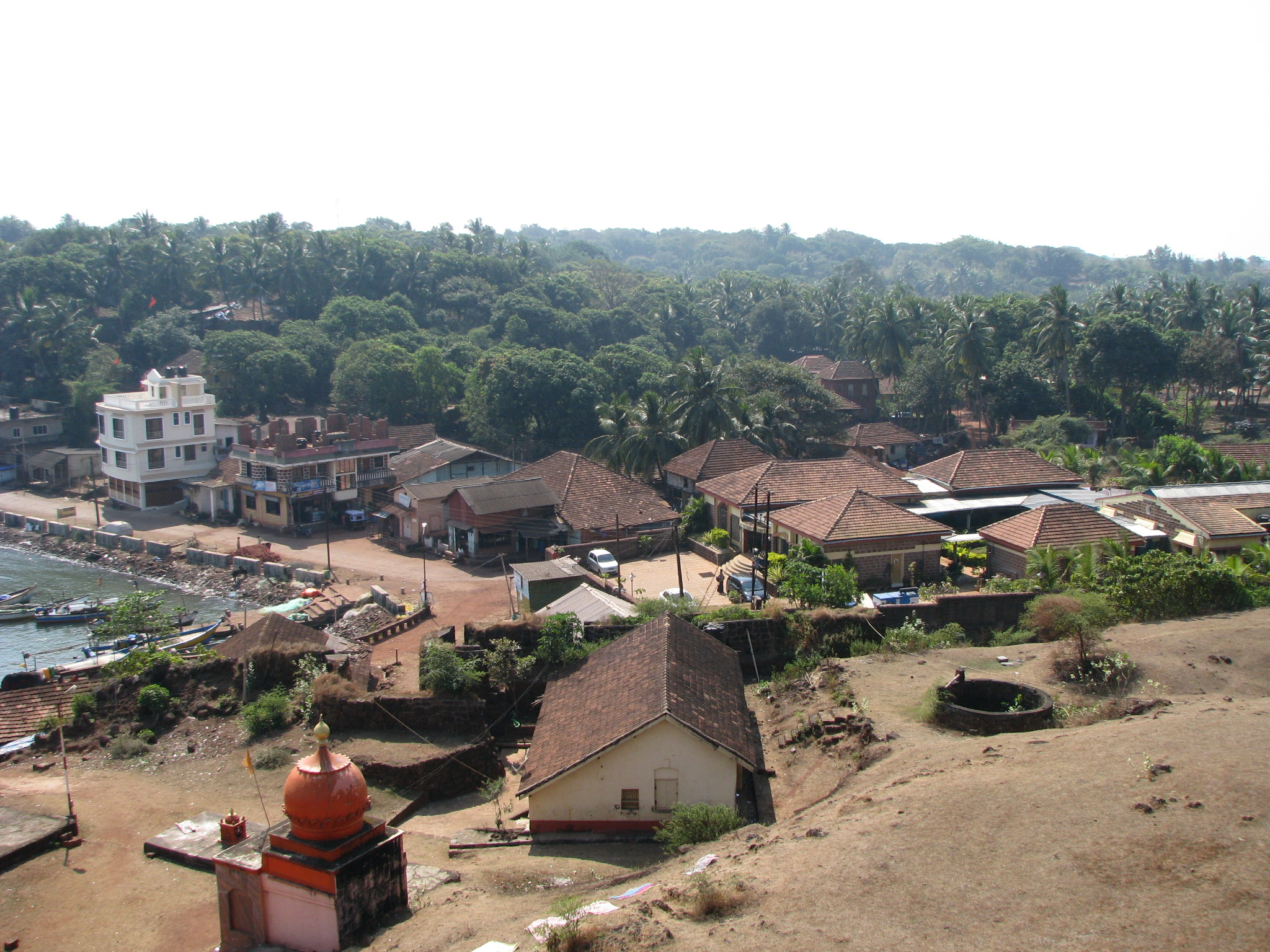
View of Vijaydurg city from Vijaydurg fort

Vijaydurg (formerly also known as Gheriah) is a seaport 485 km from Mumbai on India's West Coast. It boasts a safe harbour with average depths in excess of 100 feet.

From Vijaydurg, Goa is a 200 km drive South along the National Highway 66. The beach facing the Arabian Sea has a historic fort ( 800 years old) from which the town/seaport derives its name. The region offers a very panoramic view of the creek and the fort. A number of virgin beaches abound near Vijaydurg. There is a historic temple, a church and mosque in the village of Vijaydurg.

== Nearby places of interest ==
- Vijaydurg Fort was the naval base and dry dock used by Admiral Kanhoji Angre from 1698. The fort was originally built by Raja Bhoj in 1208 and has an entrance hollowed out in it to accommodate entry of a vessel from the sea
- Vijaydurg Port
- Shri Dev Rameshwar Temple is 1.5 kilometres (0.93 mi) from Vijaydurg, on the outskirts of Rameshwar Wadi (Rameshwar City).
- The 300-year-old tomb of Admiral Sambhaji Angre, son of Kanhoji Angre, is located just outside the walls of Shri Dev Rameshwar Temple
- Konkan Krishi Vidyapith's Mango Research Institute, Rameshwar: A research branch of Konkan's most prominent agricultural research institute is located 1 kilometre (0.62 mi) from Vijaydurg. Hybrid varieties of Alphonso such as Ratna and Sindhu have been developed here.
- Rameshwar Dockyard is a small dock located just beyond the Mango Research Institute, on the banks of Waghotan River. It is a historic dock used by the Maratha admirals for building ships and docking their smaller ships.

== Wildlife ==
Wildlife including the hyena, red fox, barking deer, sea otter, dolphin, porpoise, whale. A wide variety of fish including king mackerel, (surmai), ladyfish, pomfret, stingray, hammerhead shark, puffer fish, mullet, great white shark, carp, eel, black salmon (rawas), swordfish and the seemingly rare sailfish are routinely spotted here. Shellfish like lobster, clams, mussels, oyster, crayfish and many types of crab are abundant. Commonly occurring birds abound like the barn owl, kingfisher, kite, cormorant, stork, egret, red-whiskered bulbul and cuckoo. Endangered species include the great Indian hornbill, vulture, langur (black faced monkey), giant squirrel, crane and tern.

Since the mouth of the estuary opens into the Arabian Sea, the water is clean due to inter-tidal flushing. Vijaydurg also has a Port Trust, Sea & Land Customs Outposts, Shore-guard and a large State Transport Depot. Up until 1983, Vijaydurg was a port of call for the Konkan Steamer service, which ran two ships: Konkan Sevak and Konkan Shakti, which were later sent to supply the IPKF (Indian Peace Keeping Forces) in Sri Lanka.

== See also ==
- List of forts in Maharashtra
