= Rameshwar Dockyard =

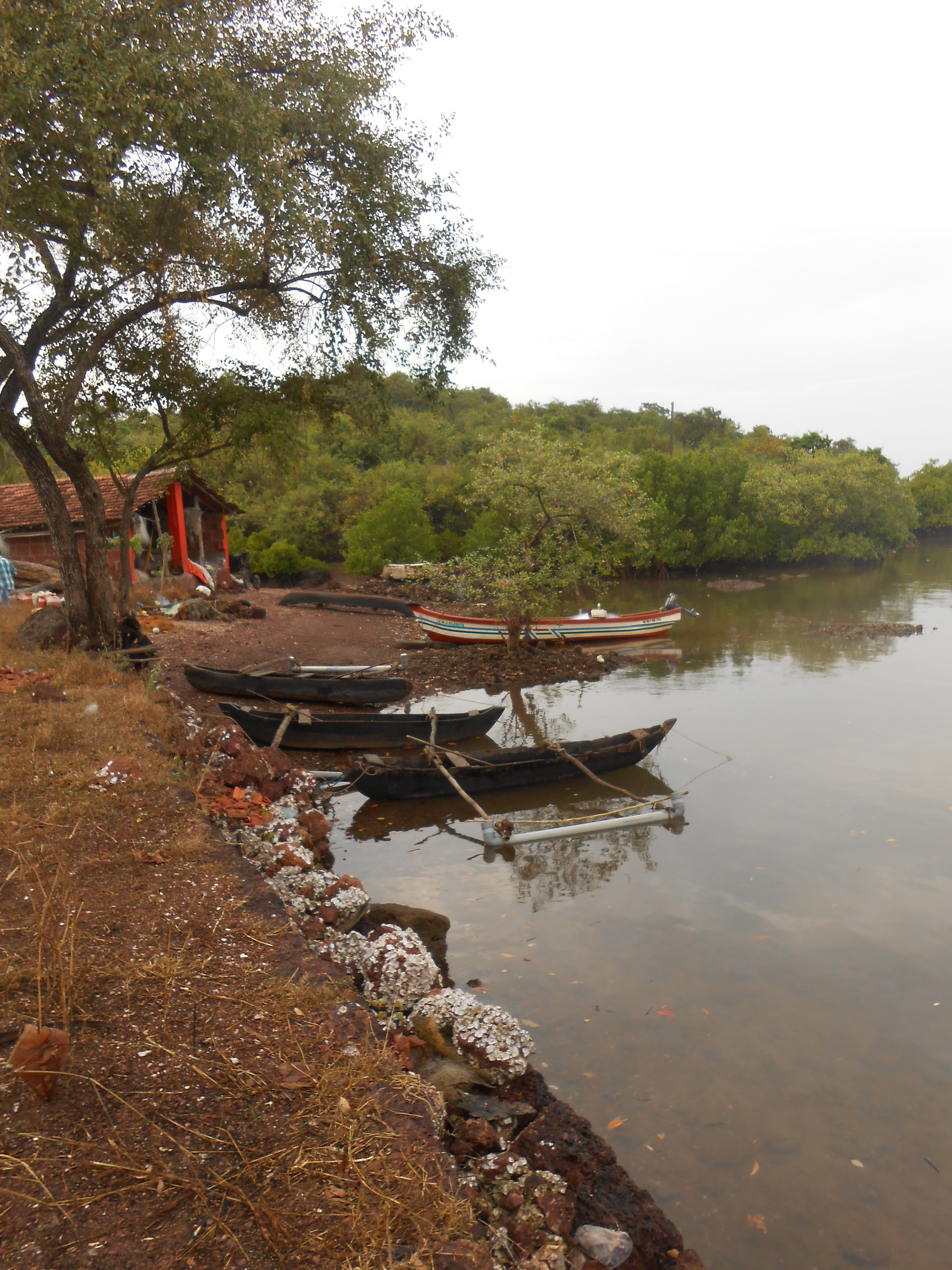
Fishing boats docked at Rameshwar Dock

Rameshwar Dockyard also known as Rameshwar Godi (Marathi) is a small tidal dockyard located on the west bank of Waghotan River of Sindhudurg District of Maharashtra state on the west coast of India. It is a naval dockyard built by the Maratha Admiral Kanhoji Angre about 1.5 km from Vijaydurg Fort, used mainly for repair and maintenance of ships of the Maratha Navy. The dockyard currently lies on the outskirts of a small Christian Settlement and is used only for the purpose of fishing.

== Rameshwar Dockyard ==
It is a tidal dockyard on the west bank of the Waghotan River or Kharepatan Creek about 1.5 km from Vijaydurg Fort. The dockyard was built by Maratha Admiral(Sarkhel) Kanhoji Angre during the 17th century and was re-modelled by Admiral (Sarkhel) Anandrao Rudrajirao Dhulap in the mid-18th century to increase its capacity to hold ships of as much as 500 tons. The length and width of the dock are 110 m x 75 m and the gateway is 7 m wide at its base and 11 m at the top without any gates. The bottom of the dock slopes upwards from the entrance. The wide base is designed to confer stability on the structure. The floor of the dockyard is made of lime mortar. This floor is now covered by a deposit of sediment more than 2 m thick.

== Dockyard and its channels ==
Repair and maintenance of the dockyard was generally carried out during the lowest low tides of the full and new moons. Ships used to enter the dockyard at high tide. There is a platform in the central part where ships were positioned for bottom repair and cleaning. Even during the monsoon, the dockyard was a suitable shelter for ships. The Indian Navy has retrieved a two-fluked iron anchor from the dockyard, thought to be of the Maratha Period. A stone-built water channel runs from the southeast corner to drain excess water from the dock. The entrance of the dockyard is blocked with sediment. It is said that there was a small shipyard and a mast house here. Wooden planks from ships have been found inside the dock. The significance of the dockyard of Rameshwar is that it is the first of its type to be found in this region dating to the Maratha Period. The site selected for the dockyard was sufficiently far from the sea and not affected by normal tidal changes. However, it was within range of the spring tide so that a ship could be floated from the dock on completion of repair work. The site is protected from the tempestuous south-west monsoon by a hill, and this enabled shipwrights to continue work even in the stormy season. It is obvious that the Marathas had a good knowledge of dock construction and also of how to keep them dry when required. Large vessels cannot enter the shallow waters of the 40 km long creek. Maratha warships could be anchored in this creek and yet remain invisible from the sea.

== Stone Anchors ==
The area surrounding the dock was overgrown. A thorough search in the adjoining area revealed a number of grapnel-type anchors. These anchors were placed on both sides of the entrance to the dock for use as mooring bits. Eight anchors were found on the right side wall of the dock. Of these, three were found erected on the wall and two were embedded in the soil. Only the top portions of the anchors are visible. The other three are lying on the eastern side of the wall. Out of these eight, two are broken, whilst the rest are in good condition.

Similar anchors were also found on the left side wall. A further five grapnel stone anchors were noticed behind the dockyard. At one spot, two have been erected and one is laid on the ground, probably to prevent soil erosion. The other two anchors have been erected at different places for use as mooring bits for ships berthed in the dock. About 200 m southeast from the dock, a triangular stone anchor was found lying on the wall. Stone anchors constitute the earliest antiquities discovered in the region. Such anchors were in use in India up to the 17th century AD, until the advent of iron anchors. The availability of the raw material and thus reduction in the cost of manufacture facilitated the extensive use of such anchors over a long period. It is still not clear whether these stone anchors were used for coastal or overseas voyages. All the grapnels and the triangular stone anchors found in clusters are made of local sandstone and fine laterite. These anchors have been uniformly chiselled on both sides and are similar to anchors from Sindhudurg Fort (Malwan) which belong to the Early Historic Period. A further eight grapnel stone anchors were noticed for the first time on the arches of the parapet wall of the second fortification of Vijaydurg Fort. These anchors have been used as lintels of arches. It is a protected yet a forgotten monument about 1 km from Rameshwar Wadi.

== Other features ==
A small fishing hut lies near the entrance of the dockyard. Locals use this as a storehouse for their fishing equipment. Most of the boats are still docked using the old stone anchors that were used as mooring bits during the period of Maratha rule. A small cannon can be seen lying on the ground just near the entrance of the dockyard. Further ahead, there are a few crosses installed by the local Christian community residing in a nearby settlement. It is a small settlement just a few meters away from the dockyard.

Small fishing ships are docked near the outer wall of the dockyard, near the fishing hut. The bigger ships are tied on the inner side of the wall, using the old stone anchors as mooring bits.

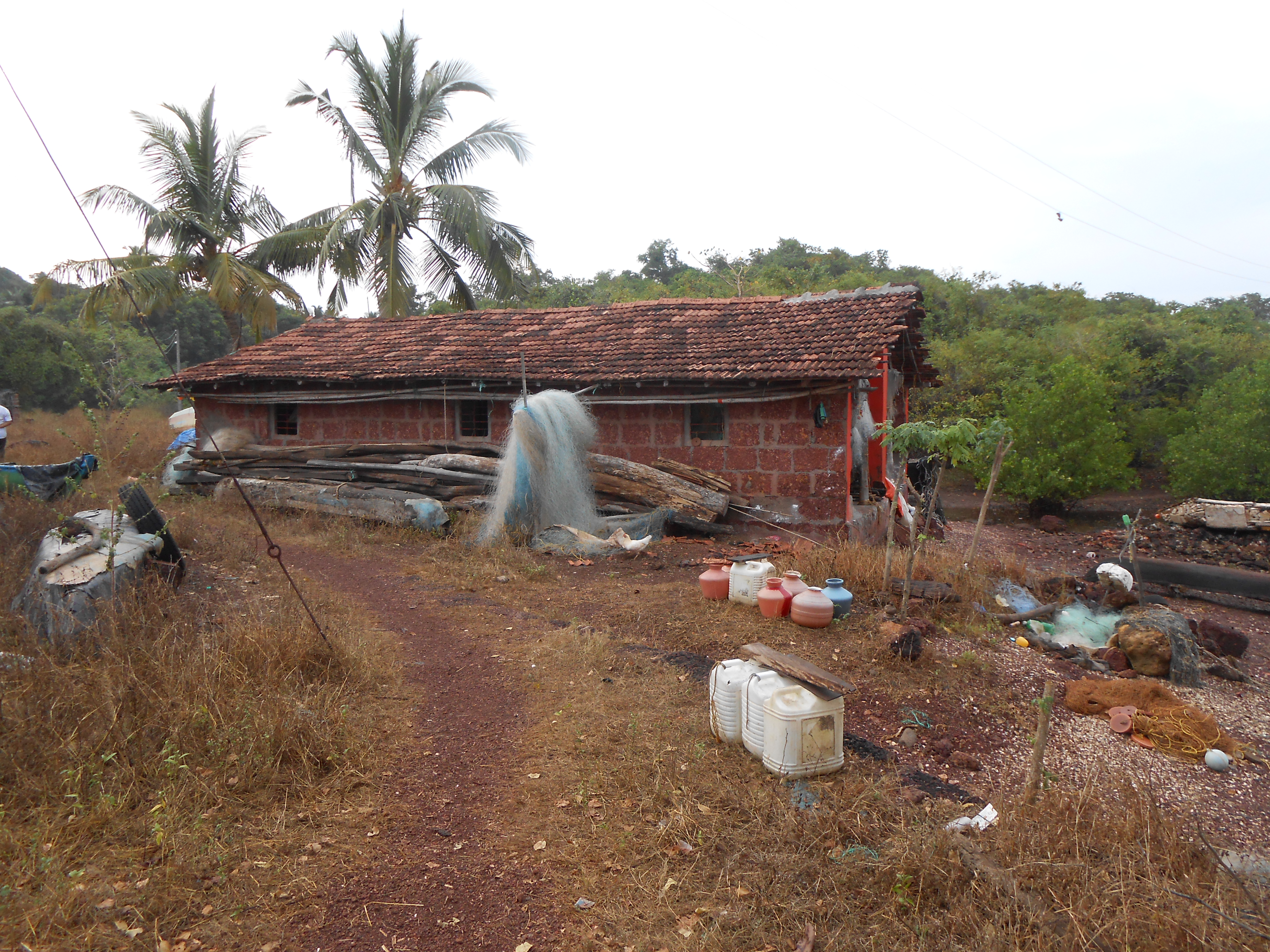
A local fishing hut near the dockyard

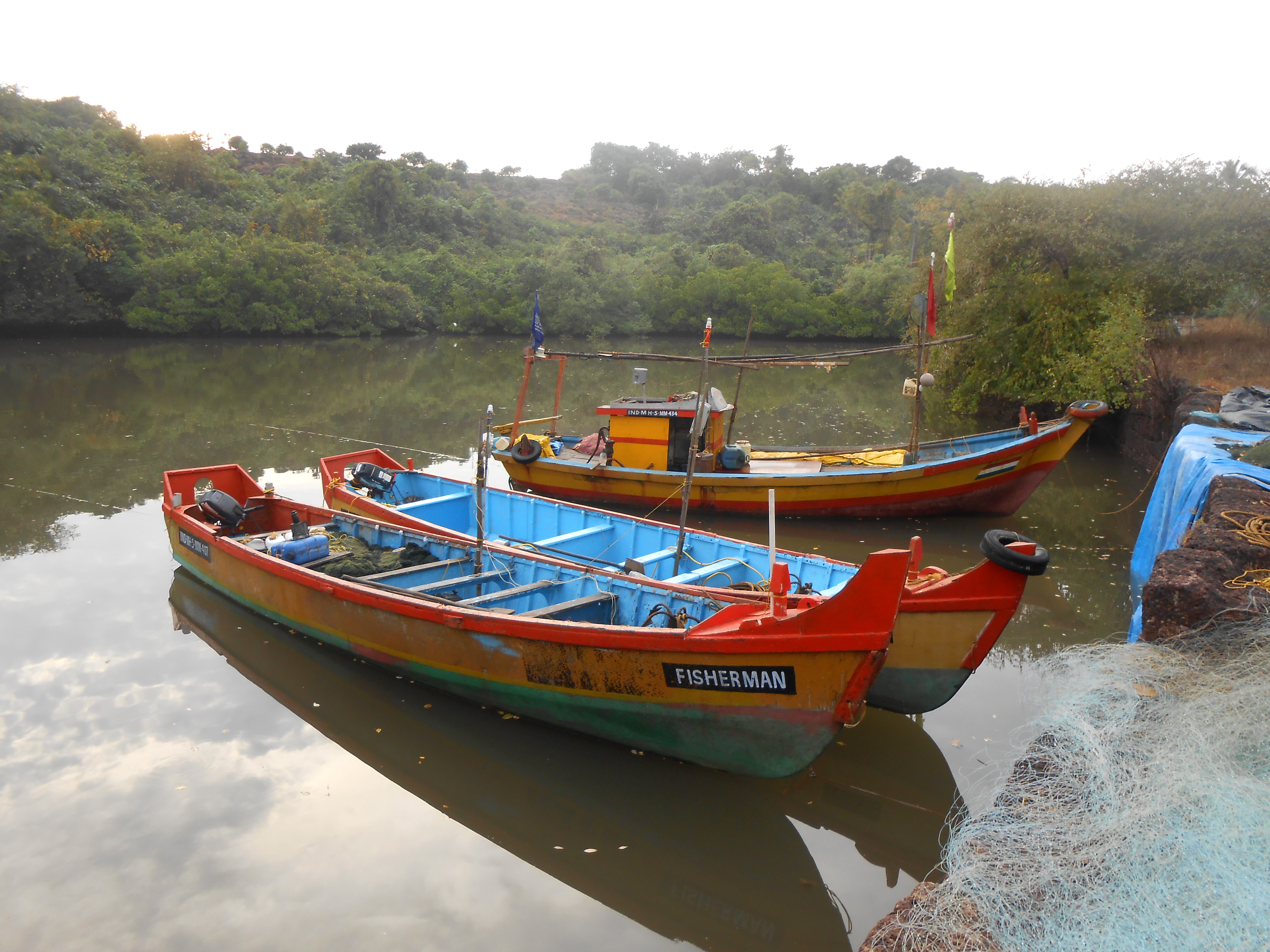
Big fishing boats tied to the old stone anchors

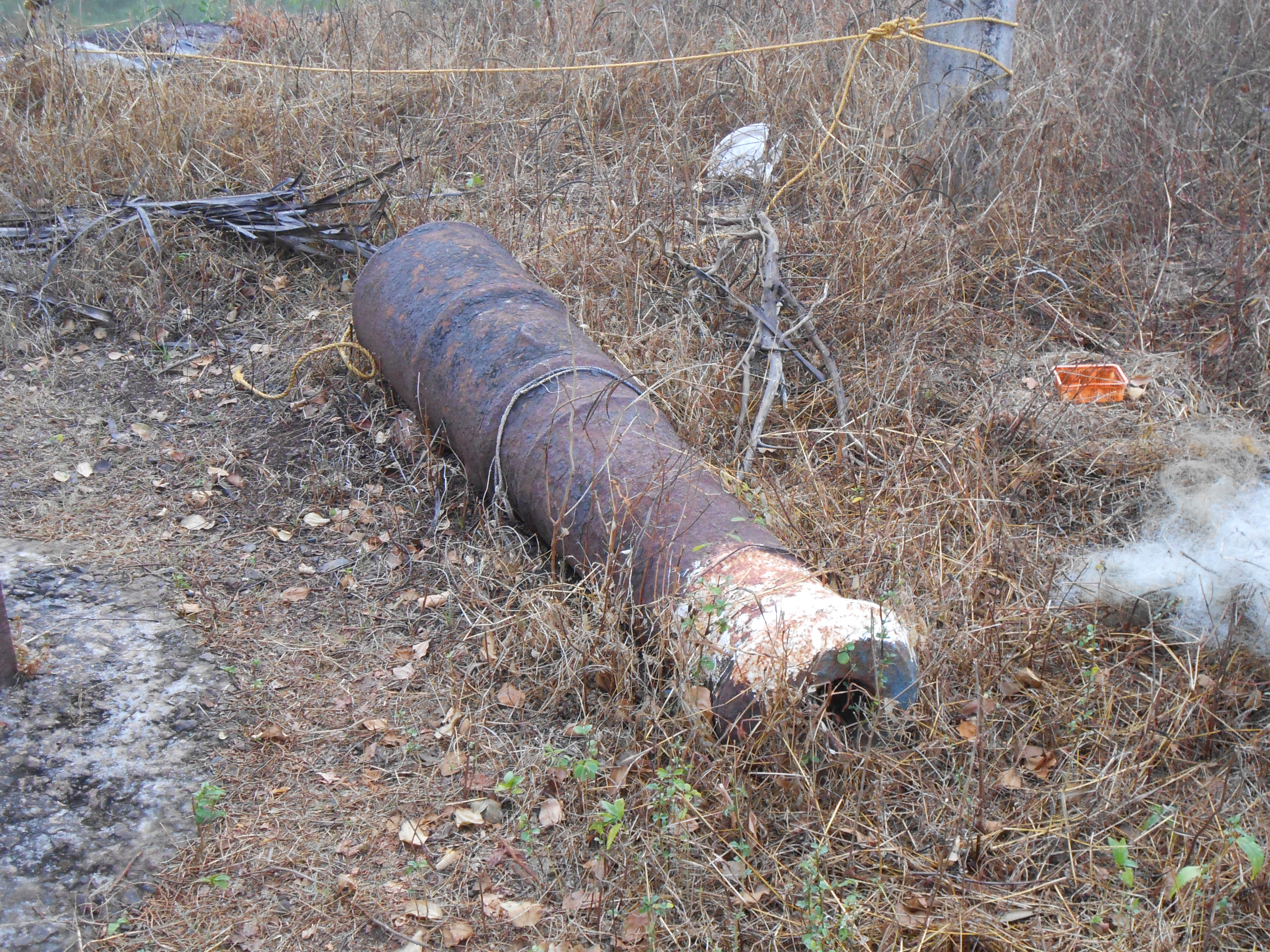
Old cannon that can be seen on the ground at the dockyard

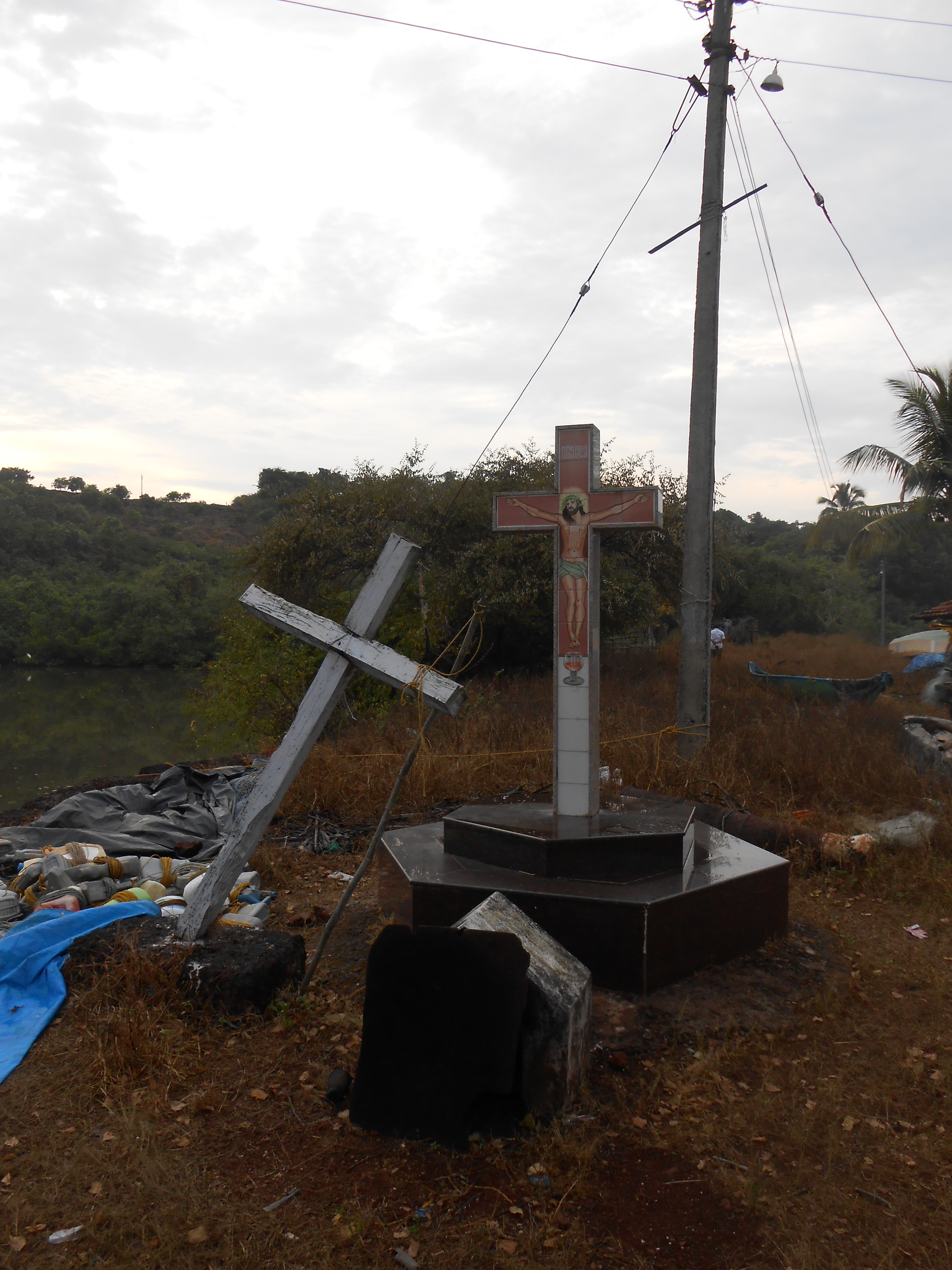
Few crosses that can be seen which are supposedly installed by the local Christian community residing in a nearby locality

== See also ==
- Rameshwar Wadi
- Shri Dev Rameshwar Temple
- Rameshwar Beach (Wafel Beach)
- Kalavshe Beach (Kolwadi)
- Hatti Mahal
- Sambhaji Angre Samadhi
- Shri Aday Durgay Temple
- Green Earth Eco-Park, Rameshwar
- Vijaydurg Fort
- Vijaydurg Beach
- Vijaydurg Port
- Dr. Balasaheb Sawant Konkan Krishi Vidyapeeth's Mango Research Sub Centre, Rameshwar(Girye)
