= Devgad Fort =

16th-century fort in Sindhudurg, Maharashtra, India

- Part of Konkan Coast
- Sindhudurg district, Maharashtra
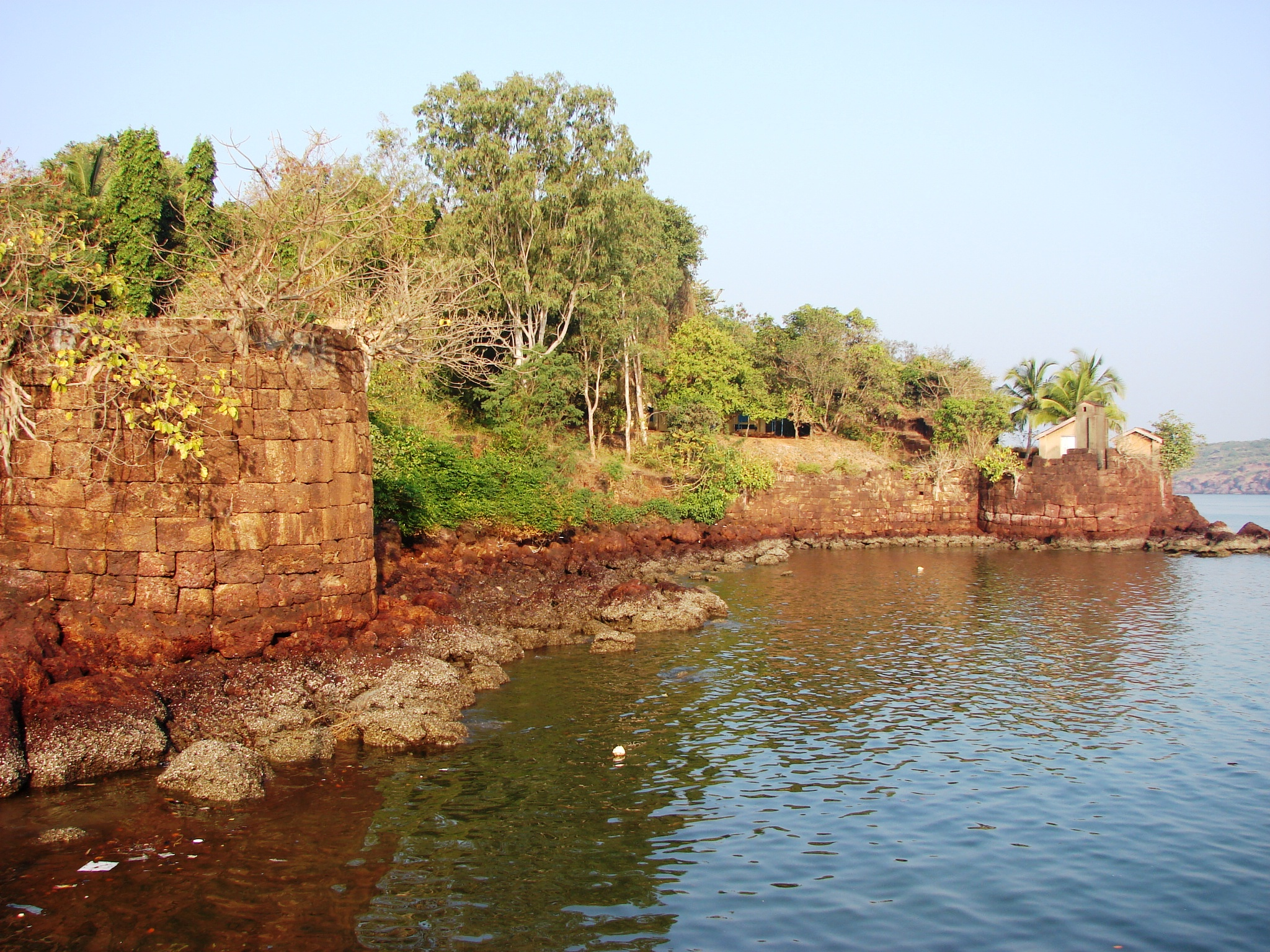

Site information
- Type: Sea Fort 16°23'13.7"N 73°22'20.1"E
- Owner: Government of India
- Controlled by: Maratha Empire (1729–1818); United Kingdom: East India Company (1818–1857); British Raj (1857–1947); India (1947-)
- Open to the public: Yes
- Condition: Ruins

Location
- Shown within Maharashtra
- Location within Maharashtra
- Coordinates: 16°23′13.7″N 73°22′20.1″E
- Height: 250 Ft.

Site history
- Materials: Laterite Stone

Devgad Fort, also called Janjira Devgad Fort, is a fort located 5 km from Devgad town, in Sindhudurg district, of Maharashtra. This fort is an important fort in Sindhudurg district. The fort is surrounded by sea from three side and to the south it is attached to the land.

== History ==
This fort was built by Dattajirao Angre in the year 1729. This fort was under the control of Kanhoji Angre for a longer period. Walter Brown of East India Company had tried to capture this fort with the help of Wadikar Sawants, however he suffered great losses in the pursuit. After the fall of Maratha empire, in April 1818 this fort was taken by a detachment of IV Rifles of British under the Colonel Imlack.

== Features ==
The lighthouse is situated on one side of the fort. Inside the fort is Ganesh temple, three cannons and the Bastions are in good state.

== See also ==
- List of forts in Maharashtra
- List of forts in India
