= Rameshwar Wadi =

- Town
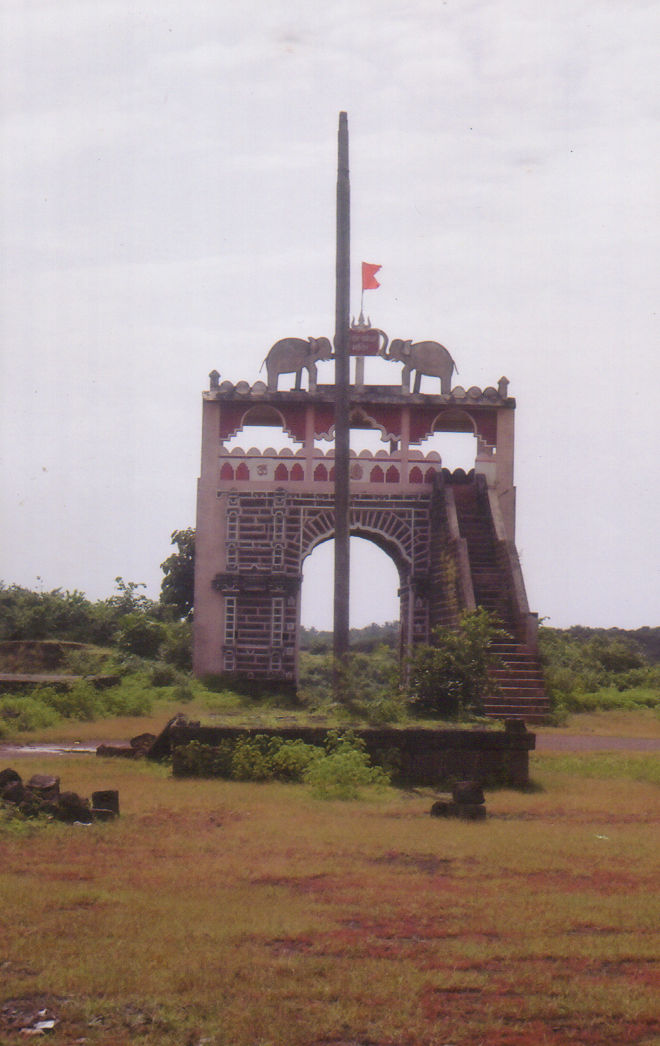
- Rameshwar Wadi Landmark

- Location in Maharashtra, India
- Coordinates: 16.5607°N 73.3334°E
- Country: India
- State: Maharashtra
- District: Sindhudurg

Government
  - Type: Gram Panchayat
  - Body: Rameshwar Gram Panchayat

Population (2011)
  - Total: 3,100

Languages
  - Official: Marathi, Malvani
- Time zone: UTC+5:30 (IST)
- PIN: 406806
- Telephone code: 02364
- Vehicle registration: MH-07
- Website: www.shridevrameshwar.org

Rameshwar also known as Rameshwar Wadi is a small town located on the coast of Sindhudurg District of Maharashtra on the west coast of India.

Dr. Balasaheb Sawant Konkan Krishi Vidyapeeth has developed a Mango Research Sub Centre over an area of about 90 acres, that has developed hybrids like Ratna, a cross between the Alphonso and Neelam variety, as well as the Kesar hybrid.

== Etymology ==
The ancient Sanskrit name of the town, Rameshwar is one of the names used to refer to LShiva. The town is named after Shiva and its temple - Shri Dev Rameshwar Temple, is located within the town boundaries.

== Rameshwar Dockyard ==
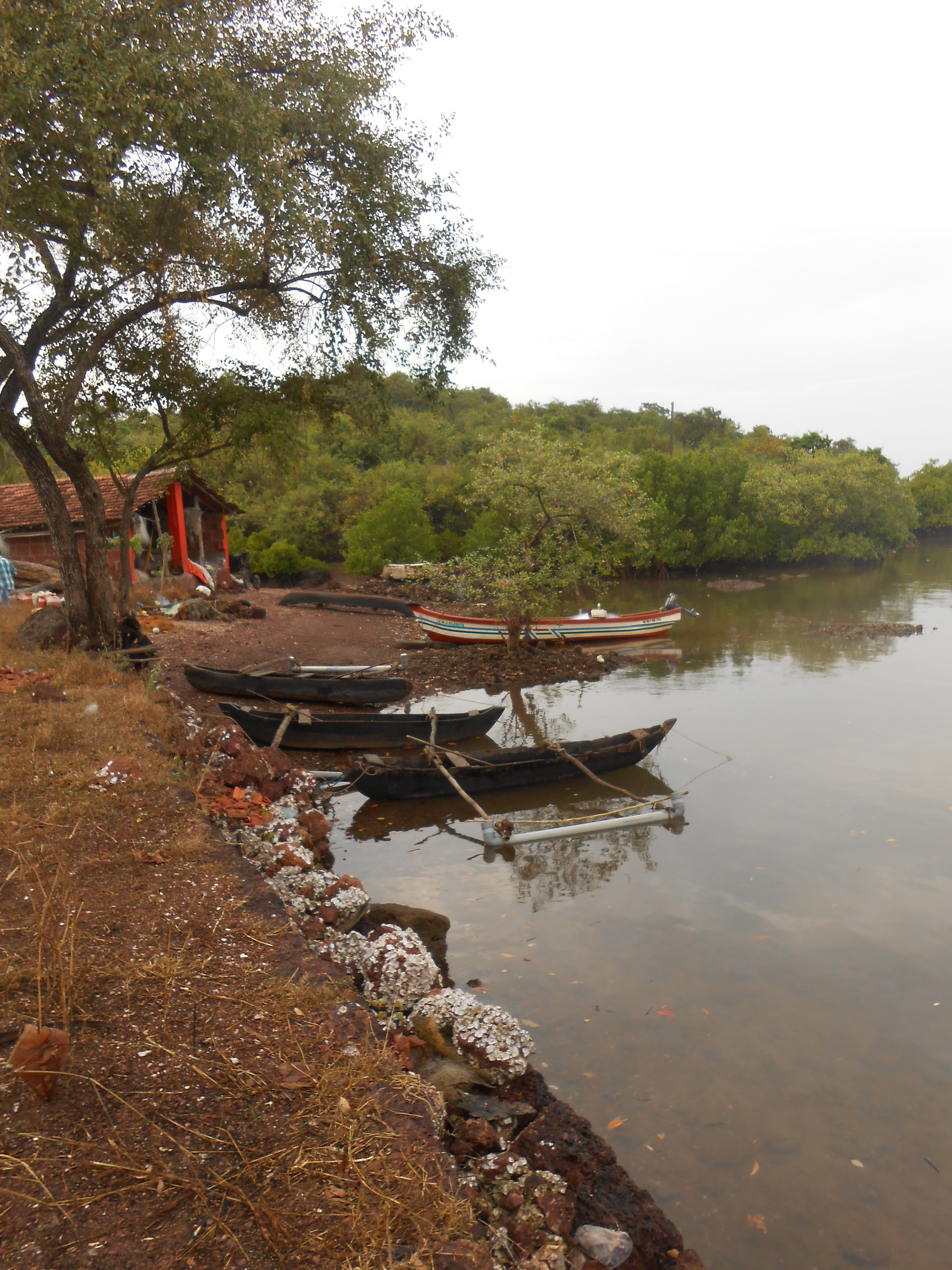
Fishing boats docked at Rameshwar Dock

Rameshwar Dockyard, also known as Rameshwar Godi, is a tidal dockyard on the left bank of Waghotan river or Kharepatan Creek about 1.5 km from Vijaydurg Fort. The dockyard was built by Maratha Admiral Kanhoji Angre during the 17th century and was re-modelled by Anandrao Dhulap to increase its capacity to hold ships of as much as 500 tons. The length and width of the dock is 110 m x 75 m and the gateway is 7 m wide at its base and 11 m at the top without any gates. The bottom of the dock slopes upwards from the entrance. The wide base is designed to confer stability on the structure. The floor of the dockyard is made of lime mortar. This floor is now covered by a deposit of sediment more than 2 m thick.

== Mango Research Sub Centre ==
The Government of Maharashtra established a Mango Research Sub Centre at Rameshwar in 1978. It is an agricultural research station under the jurisdiction of Dr. Balasaheb Sawant Konkan Krishi Vidyapeeth (known as Konkan Krishi Vidyapeeth before 12 February 2001), Dapoli, District: Ratnagiri.

== Gram Panchayat Rameshwar ==
Rameshwar Gram Panchayat (Village Panchayat) was established on 17 January 1989. The number of members is 9 and are elected from 3 divisions (prabhaags).

== Mahashivratri Fair ==
On Mahashivratri on the 13th night/14th day of the Krishna Paksha or Dark Half of the month Magha according to the Hindu calendar, devotees observe fast and stay awake all night. Mahashivratri marks the night when Shiva performed the 'Tandava'. It is also believed that on this day Shiva was married to Parvati Ma. On this day Shiva devotees observe fast and offer fruits, flowers and Bael leaves on Shiva Linga. The fair lasts for six days and many devotees from surrounding regions as well as from across the state visit Shri Dev Rameshwar Temple during this festival. Huge processions are held during the festive night as well as the following day.

=== Maha Shivratri observances ===
The following table shows some of the observances of Mahashivratri:

Year	Date	Day
2008	5 March	Wednesday
2009	23 February	Monday
2010	12 February	Friday
2011	3 March	Thursday
2012	20 February	Monday
2013	10 March	Sunday
2014	27 February	Thursday
2015	17 February	Tuesday
2016	8 March	Tuesday

== Notable sites ==
- Shri Dev Rameshwar Temple
- Rameshwar Dockyard (Godi)
- Shri Aday Durgay Temple
- Vijaydurg Fort
- Vijaydurg Port
- Dr. Balasaheb Sawant Konkan Krishi Vidyapeeth University's Mango Research Sub Centre, Rameshwar(Girye)

== See also ==
- Shri Dev Rameshwar Temple
- Alphonso (mango)
- Pujare (clan)
