= Rameshwar =

Rameshwar is an Indian masculine given name. Notable people with the name include:

- J. Rameshwar Rao (1923–1998), Indian lawyer, diplomat, politician, MP, book publisher and the titular Raja of Wanaparthy
- Harshavardhan Rameshwar, Indian composer, instrumentalist, music producer and singer
- Mayanglambam Rameshwar Singh (born 1969), Indian politician
- Rameshwar Nath Koul Bamezai (born 1951), Indian scientist in the field of human genetics and cancer biology
- Rameshwar Banerjee (1925–1945), Indian revolutionary and martyr of the Indian independence movement
- Rameshwar S. Bhagat, Indian film editor
- Rameshwar Das Birla (1892–1973), Indian entrepreneur
- Rameshwar Broota (born 1941), Indian visual artist
- Rameshwar Chaurasiya, Indian politician
- Rameshwar Lal Dudi (born 1963), Indian politician and MP
- Acharya Rameshwar Jha, Indian traditional Sanskrit scholar
- Rameshwar Nath Kao (1918–2002), Indian spymaster and the first chief of Research and Analysis Wing (R&AW)
- Rameshwar Singh Kashyap (1927–1992), Indian playwright, screenwriter and professor
- Rameshwar Mahto (born 1976), Indian politician
- Rameshwar Neekhra (born 1946), Indian politician and MP
- Rameshwar Oraon (born 1947), Indian politician and MP
- Rameshwar Pathak (1938–2010), Indian kamrupi lokgeet singer and teacher
- Rameshwar Patidar (1938–2021), Indian politician and MP
- Rameshwar Prasad (politician) (c. 1930–2020), Indian politician from Uttar Pradesh
- Rameshwar Prasad (politician) (born 1947), Indian politician from Bihar, MP
- Rameshwar Sahu (1919–?), Indian politician, MP and chairman of Indian Railways
- Rameshwar Sharma, Indian politician
- Rameshwar Prasad Sinha (died 1965), Indian politician and freedom fighter
- Rameshwar Singh (1860–1929), Indian maharaja of Darbhanga
- Rameshwar Singh (politician), Indian politician
- Rameshwar Tantia (1910–1977), Indian politician and MP
- Rameswar Teli (born 1970), Indian politician
- Rameshwar Thakur (1925–2015), Indian politician, union minister and state governor
- Rameshwar Prasad Yadav, Indian politician
- Rameshwar Raya Yadav (born 1955), Nepalese politician, MP and cabinet minister
- Rameshwar Singh Yadav (born 1953), Indian politician and MP

== See also ==
- Rameshwar (disambiguation)
