= Devgad taluka =

Taluka in Maharashtra, India

Coordinates: 16.3735°N 73.3778°E

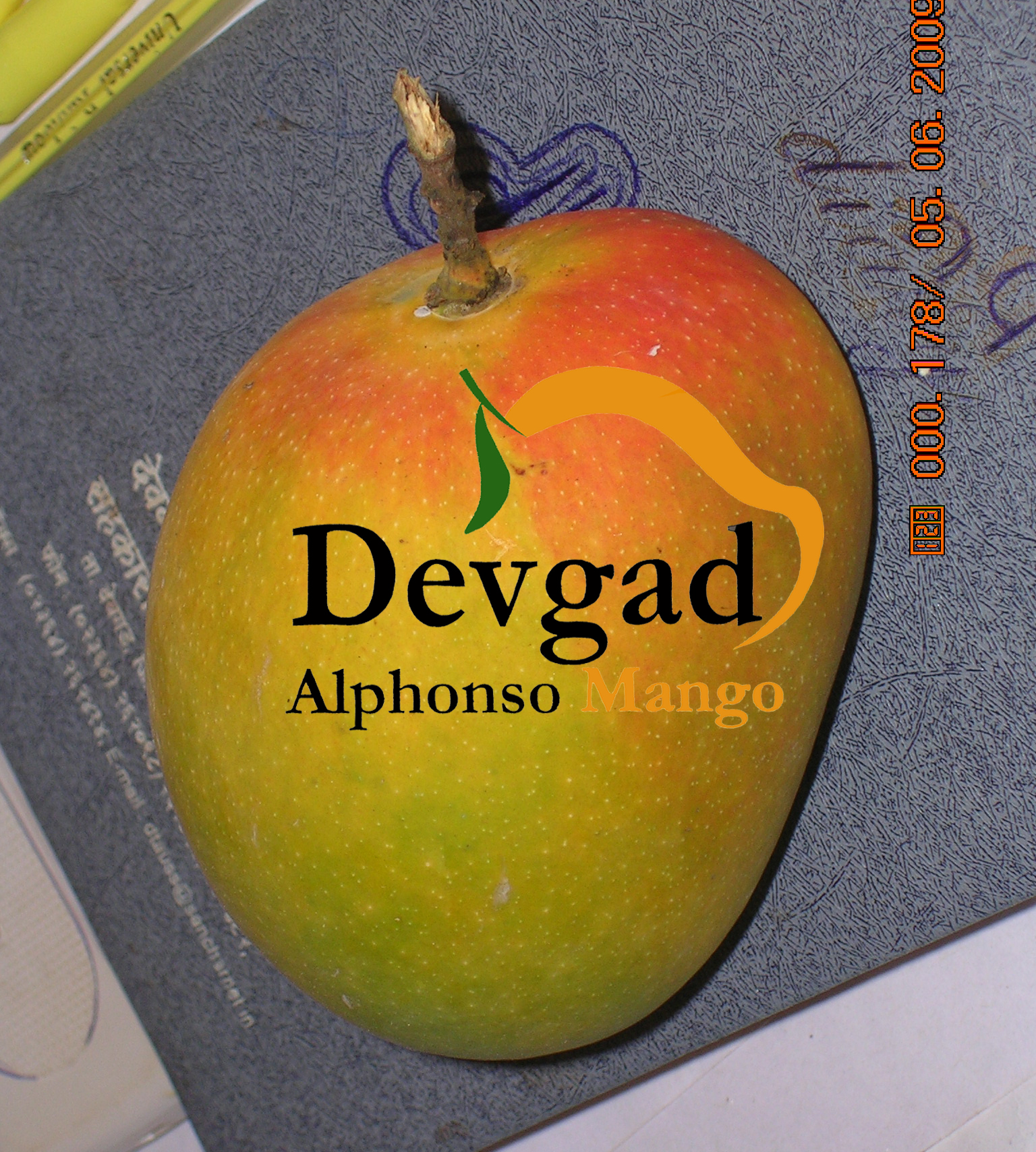
Alphonso mango

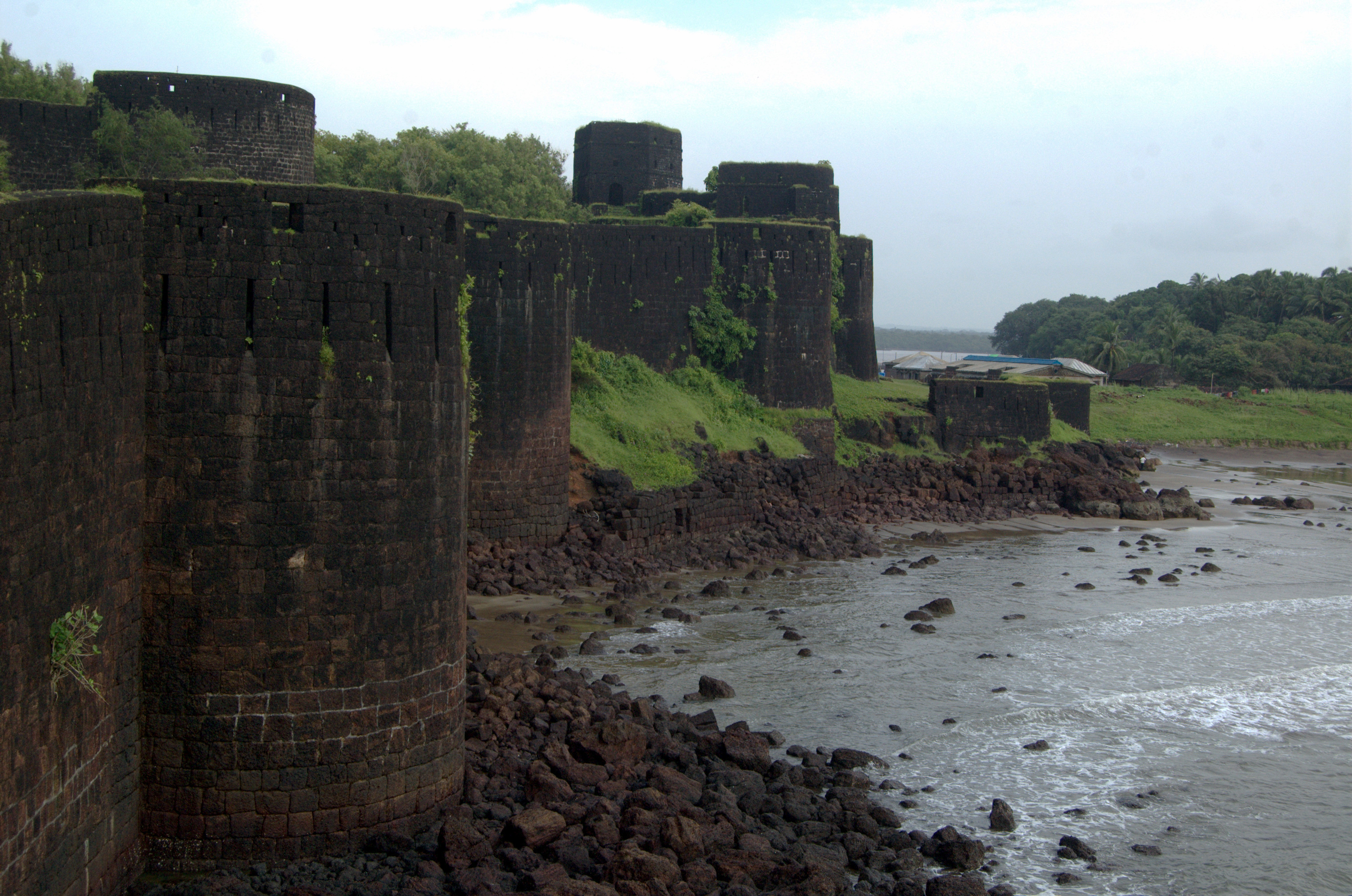
Bastions of Vijaydurg fort

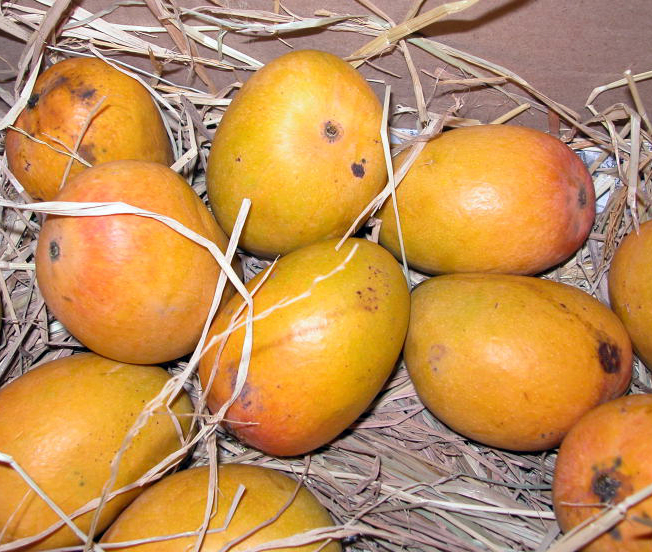
Alphonso mangoes (Hapoos), grown mainly in Maharashtra's Sindhudurg, Devgad, and Ratnagiri districts, are popular in the United States.

Devgad is a taluka in Sindhudurg district of Maharashtra, India consisting of 98 villages. It is located on the Arabian Sea in the coastal Konkan region of Maharashtra, south of Mumbai. Devgad is known globally for its exports of locally grown Alphonso mangoes.

Devgad is a natural harbour which only small vessels can enter.

== History ==
It is noted for its harbour, its beach, and a lighthouse built in 1915 at the Devgad fort. Raja Bhoja II built Fort Vijaydurg (Gheria), ruled later by Adil Shah and eventually by Shivaji.

== Transportation ==
The nearest railway station is Kankavli on Konkan Railway on Mumbai-Goa road.

There is a wall under the sea at shores of the Vijaydurg built such that an enemy's ships, trying to attack, would crash and sink.

== Trade ==
Devgad is also widely known for its pure Alphonso mango cultivation/farming and the whole development has evolved due to undertaking of the cultivation of Alphonso mango farming. Mangoes grown here are characterized by their distinct aroma, smooth exterior, thin skin and thick saffron pulp. The variety is different from the Alphonso mangoes grown in the Ratnagiri district. Such is the popularity of the Devgad Alphonso mango that vendors often pass off other similar looking mangoes under the name of Devgad Alphonso. Devgad Alphonso mango is grown on an area of 45,000 acres and reaches a production of about 50,000 tons in a year of decent production. Devgad is also home to the oldest and biggest co-operative society of mango farmers in India, called the Devgad Taluka Amba Utpadak Sahakari Sanstha Maryadit or Devgad Taluka Mango Growers Society Ltd with over 700 alphonso growers and 25-year-old in 2013.

Fishing is carried out on a large scale in the sea as well as in the creeks throughout the taluka region. The staple diet of this region is rice and fish.

The first windmill project in Maharashtra was installed at Girye.

== Climate ==
Climate data for Devgad taluka (1981–2010, extremes 1944–2006)
Month	Jan	Feb	Mar	Apr	May	Jun	Jul	Aug	Sep	Oct	Nov	Dec	Year
Record high °C (°F)	36.4 (97.5)	36.9 (98.4)	39.2 (102.6)	37.2 (99.0)	38.0 (100.4)	37.2 (99.0)	32.4 (90.3)	33.0 (91.4)	32.9 (91.2)	36.6 (97.9)	36.3 (97.3)	35.2 (95.4)	39.2 (102.6)
Mean daily maximum °C (°F)	30.8 (87.4)	30.8 (87.4)	31.4 (88.5)	32.2 (90.0)	33.4 (92.1)	31.0 (87.8)	29.2 (84.6)	28.7 (83.7)	29.4 (84.9)	31.3 (88.3)	32.6 (90.7)	31.7 (89.1)	31.0 (87.8)
Mean daily minimum °C (°F)	19.6 (67.3)	20.2 (68.4)	22.5 (72.5)	24.5 (76.1)	26.2 (79.2)	24.4 (75.9)	23.8 (74.8)	23.4 (74.1)	23.0 (73.4)	23.3 (73.9)	21.8 (71.2)	20.5 (68.9)	22.8 (73.0)
Record low °C (°F)	15.4 (59.7)	16.2 (61.2)	18.4 (65.1)	19.7 (67.5)	19.4 (66.9)	17.8 (64.0)	18.0 (64.4)	17.3 (63.1)	17.3 (63.1)	15.5 (59.9)	14.1 (57.4)	14.5 (58.1)	14.1 (57.4)
Average rainfall mm (inches)	0.0 (0.0)	0.0 (0.0)	0.0 (0.0)	2.6 (0.10)	76.9 (3.03)	791.9 (31.18)	786.4 (30.96)	547.5 (21.56)	270.0 (10.63)	70.1 (2.76)	13.7 (0.54)	0.2 (0.01)	2,559.3 (100.76)
Average rainy days	0.0	0.0	0.0	0.3	2.5	17.9	23.1	23.9	13.3	4.1	1.2	0.1	86.3
Average relative humidity (%) (at 17:30 IST)	61	63	68	68	70	81	86	87	83	77	67	60	73
Source: India Meteorological Department

== Places to visit ==
Devgad is slowly becoming a tourist hot spot for tourists who want to avoid Goa beaches. This is perfect for family outing in a peaceful and calm backdrop.

- Kunkeshwar shiva temple- There is a temple of Hindu deity Shiva which was built in 11th century situated in Kunkeshwar town, 16 Km from main city of Devgad. It is very famous for its Divinity and religious values across Maharashtra and people gather from across Maharashtra on the occasion of Mahashivratri.
- Shri Dev Rameshwar Temple- This is a 16th-century temple called as Shri Dev Rameshwar Temple, dedicated to lord shiva located at Rameshwar.
- Bhagwati Devi temple- There is a temple dedicated to the goddess Devi Bhagwati at the village of Munge.
- Vishweswarayya and Swami Kartikaswamy temple- There are temples to God Vishweswarayya and Swami Kartikaswamy at Hindale village.
- Dirba Devi temple- A small village known as Jamsande is situated near to Devgad. The famous Dirba Devi goddess temple is located in jamsande. It is approximately 4 km from the Devgad bus stand. There is a small fair during Tripuri pourninam
- Devgad Lighthouse-The western coastline is highly sensitive, hence recently, Government of India installed static radar and electro-optic sensors at Devgad Lighthouse as a part of India's first coastal surveillance network. Devgad is one out of 46 locations chosen for the network and envisages real-time surveillance cover up to 25 nautical miles.
- Devgad Fort- This is situated 3 km from bus stand, on the east of the town. The Ganesh mandir and tree old cannons are worth visiting. This fort is situated on a small hillock close to the sea. Panoramic view of sea and the sunset view is best seen from the fort.
- Devgad Beach- It is about 2 km from the Devgad bus stand.

== Demography ==
The following is a list of villages and their populations according to 2011 Census data:

Sr. no	Village	Administrative division	Population
1	Aadbandar	Devgad	292
2	Are	Devgad	1,335
3	Bagamala	Devgad	303
4	Bagatalavade	Devgad	136
5	Bandegaon	Devgad	222
6	Baparde	Devgad	1,304
7	Burabavade	Devgad	603
8	Chafed	Devgad	629
9	Chandoshi	Devgad	697
10	Chinchwad	Devgad	280
11	Dabhole	Devgad	2,356
12	Dahibaon	Devgad	1,517
13	Devgad	Devgad	2,417
14	Dhalavali	Devgad	1,230
15	Dhoptewadi	Devgad	796
16	Elaye	Devgad	1,697
17	Gadhitamhane	Devgad	648
18	Gavane	Devgad	693
19	Girye	Devgad	2,457
20	Goval	Devgad	1,039
21	Hadpid	Devgad	522
22	Hindale	Devgad	1,714
23	Hurshi	Devgad	1,206
24	Jamsande	Devgad	14,487
25	Juveshwar	Devgad	1,057
26	Kalambai	Devgad	1,066
27	Kalvi	Devgad	604
28	Kasaba Waghotan	Devgad	313
29	Katvan	Devgad	794
30	Katwaneshwar	Devgad	829
31	Khudi	Devgad	1,527
32	Kinjawade	Devgad	2,491
33	Korle	Devgad	681
34	Kotkamte	Devgad	1,808
35	Kunkawan	Devgad	896
36	Kunkeshwar	Devgad	1,829
37	Kuvale	Devgad	1,255
38	Lingdal	Devgad	491
39	Mahalunge	Devgad	1,054
40	Malegaon	Devgad	1,025
41	Malpewadi	Devgad	632
42	Manche	Devgad	2,261
43	Mithbaon	Devgad	2,241
44	Mithmumbari	Devgad	920
45	Mohulgaon	Devgad	715
46	Mond	Devgad	1,564
47	Mondpar	Devgad	907
48	Morve	Devgad	408
49	Mouje Waghotan	Devgad	1,380
50	Munage	Devgad	1,883
51	Mutat	Devgad	1,933
52	Nad	Devgad	990
53	Nadan	Devgad	2,105
54	Naringre	Devgad	1,516
55	Nimatwadi	Devgad	629
56	Ombal	Devgad	527
57	Padel	Devgad	3,673
58	Padthar	Devgad	1,074
59	Padvane	Devgad	660
60	Palekarwadi	Devgad	1,210
61	Patgaon	Devgad	942
62	Pavnai	Devgad	732
63	Pendhari	Devgad	1,053
64	Phanase	Devgad	738
65	Phanasgaon	Devgad	1,328
66	Pombhurle	Devgad	1,910
67	Poyare	Devgad	943
68	Pural	Devgad	1,203
69	Rahateshwar	Devgad	628
70	Rameshwar	Devgad	2,099
71	Rembavali	Devgad	259
72	Salashi	Devgad	1,164
73	Sandve	Devgad	473
74	Saundale	Devgad	1,939
75	Sherighera Kamte	Devgad	4
76	Shevare	Devgad	368
77	Shiravali	Devgad	478
78	Shirgaon	Devgad	2,555
79	Somlewadi	Devgad	602
80	Talavade	Devgad	1,163
81	Talebajar	Devgad	689
82	Tambaldeg	Devgad	731
83	Tembavali	Devgad	829
84	Thakurwadi	Devgad	1,033
85	Tirlot	Devgad	2,307
86	Torsole	Devgad	1,172
87	Undil	Devgad	623
88	Valivande	Devgad	962
89	Vijaydurg	Devgad	1,735
90	Virwadi	Devgad	391
91	Vitthaladevi	Devgad	668
92	Wadaker Poi	Devgad	178
93	Wade	Devgad	1,728
94	Wadetar	Devgad	293
95	Waghivare	Devgad	381
96	Wanivade	Devgad	811
97	Wareri	Devgad	1,869
98	Welgave	Devgad	400
