= Dr. Balasaheb Sawant Konkan Krishi Vidyapeeth =

University in Maharashtra, India

Coordinates: 18°37′22.62″N 73°53′14.43″E

- Former name: Konkan Krishi Vidyapeeth
- Type: Public
- Established: 18 May 1972 (54 years ago)
- Chancellor: Governor of Maharashtra
- Vice-Chancellor: Dr. Sanjay G. Bhave
- Location: Dapoli, Maharashtra, India
- Website: www.dbskkv.org

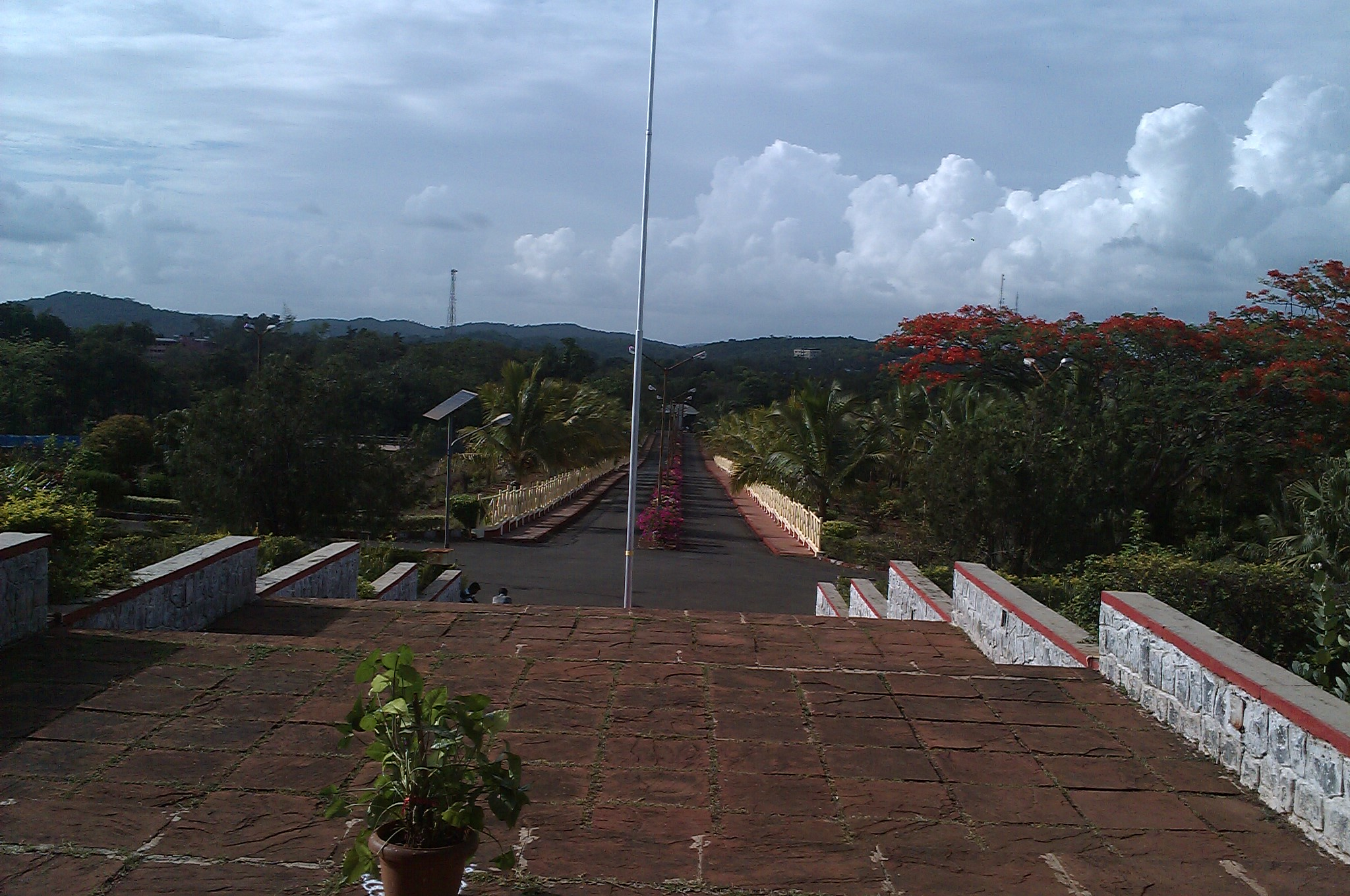
College of agriculture

Dr. Balasaheb Sawant Konkan Krishi Vidyapeeth, formerly Konkan Krishi Vidyapeeth, is an agricultural university at Dapoli in Ratnagiri district, Maharashtra. It was established on 18 May 1972 as Konkan Krishi Vidyapeeth, and got its present name on 12 February 2001 in memory of third Chief Minister of Maharashtra P. K. Sawant.

Its research centre at Karjat has developed some patented varieties of rice. Its major focus areas are rice, horticulture and fisheries. In 1997, it received the Best Institute Award of the Indian Council of Agricultural Research. Dr. Sanjay G. Bhave is the 16th Vice Chancellor of this University, he was appointed by Chancellor on 07 June 2023.

In July 2018, about 30 staff members of the University who were travelling in the bus were killed in a road accident.

== College of Agriculture, Dapoli ==
The College of Agriculture in the main campus was established in 1965.

- B.Sc. (Agri) - Bachelor of Science (Agriculture)
- B.Sc. (Hort) - Bachelor of Science (Horticulture)
- B.Sc. (Fore) - Bachelor of Science (Forestry)
- B.Sc. (AMM) - Bachelor of Science (Agril Marketing & Business Management)
- B. Tech. (Food Sc.) Bachelor of Technology (Food Science)
- M.Sc. (Agri) Master of Science (Agriculture)
- Ph.D. - Doctor of Philosophy (Agriculture)

== College of Forestry, Dapoli ==
College of Forestry, Dapoli, District Ratnagiri, Maharashtra (India)

In the main campus of Dr. Balasaheb Sawant Konkan Krishi Vidyapeeth the College of Forestry was established on 1 August 2005. It offers the B. Sc. Forestry Degree. B. Sc. Forestry is a four-year degree course. There are only two forestry colleges in Maharashtra State, one in Dapoli and another located at Akola, the College of Forestry, Akola. (Dr. Panjabrao Deshmukh Krishi Vidyapith, Akola, Maharashtra, India)

Student Profile: The students from this college prefer to do M.Sc. Forestry and Ph.D. Forestry from Indian as well as foreign universities. Many students study for Indian forest service examinations, ICAR JRF and SRF examinations. Many students join M.Sc. Forestry courses at Forest Research Institute, Dehra Dun.

== College of Agricultural Engineering and Technology, Dapoli ==
It offers only one course in B. Tech. (Agril Engg). The college of agricultural engineering and technology comprises 6 major departments:

1. Department of Renewable Energy Sources
2. Department of Farm Machinery and Power
3. Department of Irrigation and Drainage
4. Department of Soil and Water Conservation Engineering
5. Department of Agriculture Process Engineering
6. Department of Farm Structure

The college was started on 3 July 1999 and recently completed ten years of excellence. It is the first agricultural university to get the certification of ISO9000-2000. It also offers post graduate (M.Tech) and doctoral degrees in agricultural engineering in all the departments except the Department of Farm Structure from 2004.

== College of Fisheries, Ratnagiri ==
The College of Fisheries is 5 km (3.1 mi) from Ratnagiri city. It was established in 1981 and is the only college in the state to offer an undergraduate fisheries programme. Courses offered are:

- B. F. Sc.
- M. F. Sc. (Aquaculture)
- M. F. Sc. (Fish Processing Technology)
- M. F. Sc. (Fisheries Resource Management and Extension Education)
- M. F. Sc. ([Fisheries Engineering])
- Ph. D. (Fisheries) and (Aquaculture)

== Research and extension ==
The university carries out extensive research related to rice, fruits, horticulture, fisheries and agricultural technology. It has 15 off-campus research stations throughout the Konkan region. There are two Krishi Vigyan Kendras (Agricultural Science Centres) at Shirgaon (Ratnagiri) and Karjat (Raigad) providing education and training to local farmers, demonstrate new technology at farmers fields.

== See also ==
- P.K. Sawant on Marathi Wikipedia
