= Shri Dev Rameshwar Temple =

- श्री देव रामेश्वर मंदिर

Religion
- Affiliation: Hinduism
- District: Sindhudurg
- Deity: Lord Rameshwar (Lord Shiva)
- Festival: Mahashivratri

Location
- Location: Rameshwar Wadi
- State: Maharashtra
- Country: India
- Interactive map of Shri Dev Rameshwar Temple

Architecture
- Completed: 16th Century
- Temple: 1

Website
- www.shridevrameshwar.org

Shri Dev Rameshwar Temple is located in the village Rameshwar Wadi in Devgad taluka of Sindhudurg District, Maharashtra, India. This temple is dedicated to the Hindu deity Shiva. It is a historic temple built in the 16th century. Its chief interest is the approach about 250 yards long, cut through rock fifty feet deep. The idol, a four-armed figure seated on a bull, is made of solid silver and allegedly weighs a hundred kilograms, it is in good condition at present.

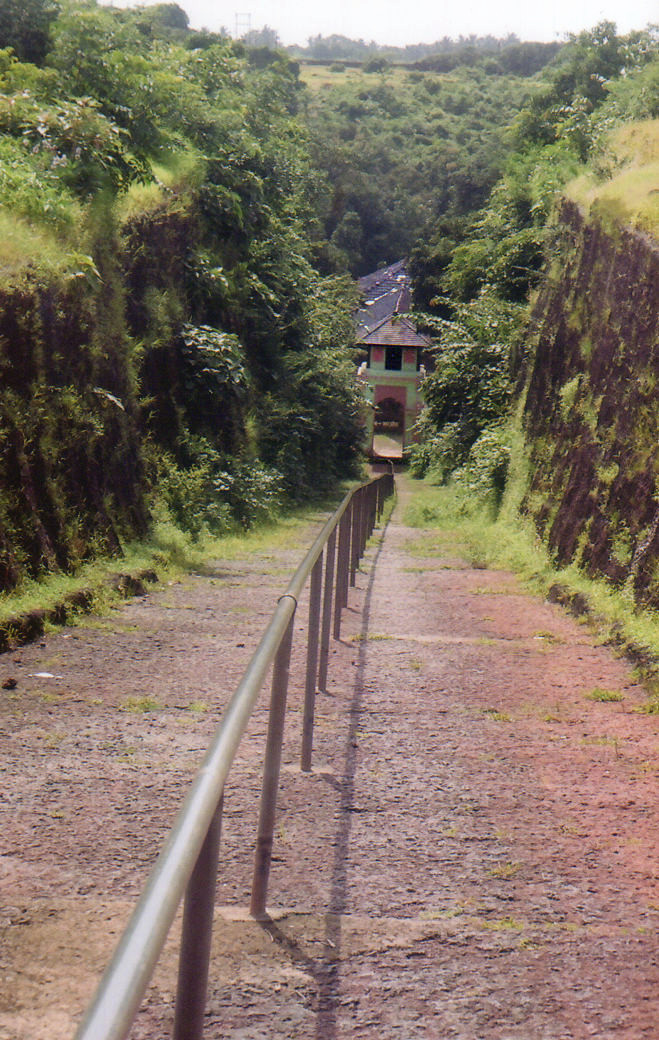
Temple Ghati (Eastern Gate)

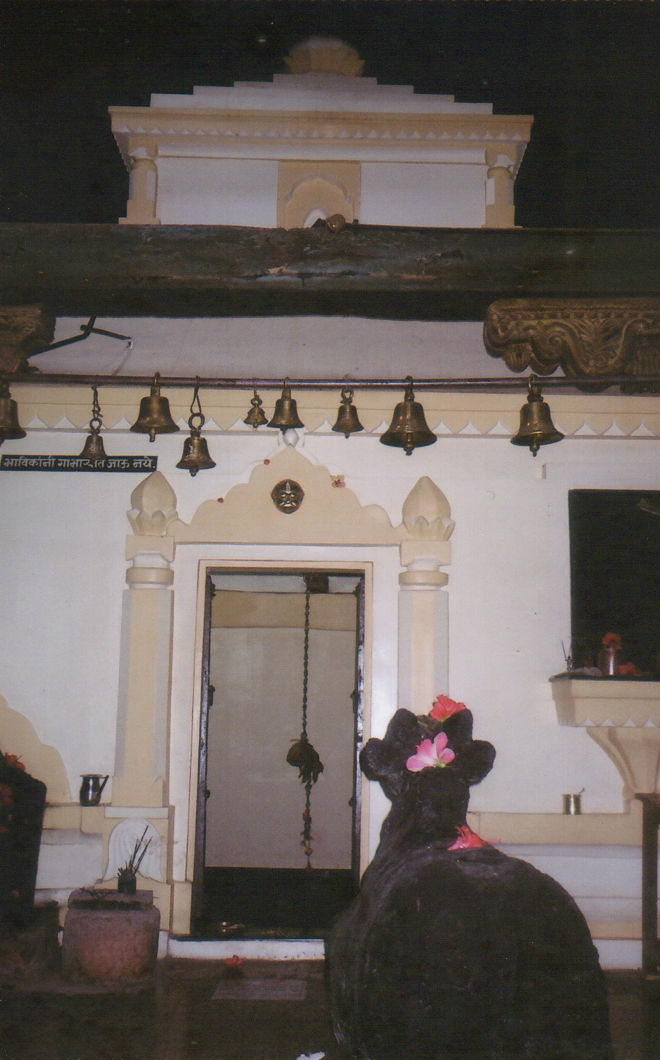
Gabhara (Inner Sanctum)

The architectural patterns of the temple building shows that it has been expanded at least three times from its establishment until now. In the early 18th century, Sarkhel Kanhoji Angre built a quadrangular inner shrine made up of finely hewn stones, also called as the Gabhara around the original place of Shiva's pindi. This is the main room of the temple which contains a shivling or pindi at its centre. Later, in the mid-18th century, Sardar Sambhaji Angre and Sankhoji Angre built a Mandap in front of the gabhara. This mandap consisted of four huge wooden pillars bearing beautiful carvings. They also built a Pradakshina Marg around the gabhara. The entire area was enclosed with walls to form a small temple consisting of the gabhara, the mandap and pradakshina Marg. The entire temple building covers an area of 4,025 sq ft. Stone tiles were placed in the area outside the main temple building covering an area of about 15,000 sq ft. It was in this era that the temple was provided with two new gates on the western and southern side.

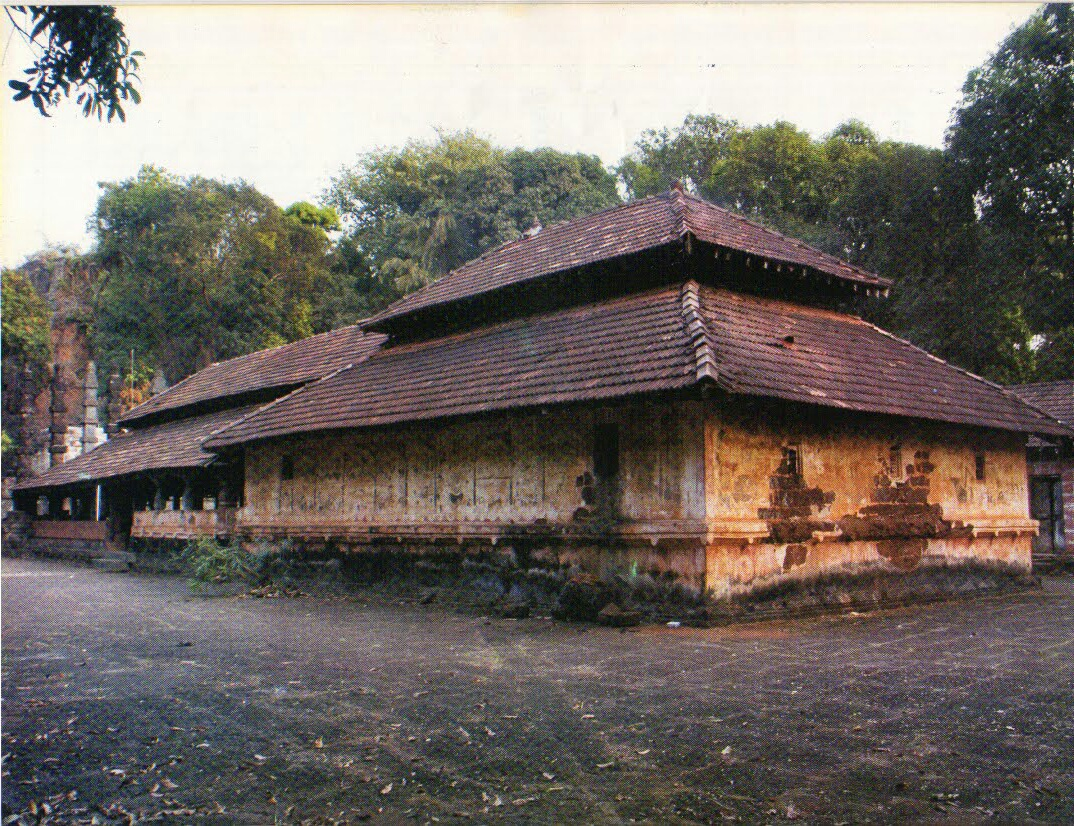
Shri Dev Rameshwar Temple - Main Building

In 1763, Shrimant Madhavrao Peshwe appointed Sarkhel Anandrao Rudrajirao Dhulap as the chief of the Maratha Navy. Anandrao was also appointed as the governor of Vijaydurg Fort. In 1775, Madhavrao Peshwe appointed Gangadhar Bhanu as the Subhedar of Vijaydurg region. 5 years later, in 1780, Subhedar Gangadhar Bhanu built a huge Sabha Mandap with 20 carved wooden pillars. In the early 18th century, there were many changes and developments in the structures, architecture and the surroundings of the temple. The most notable change was made by Sarkhel Anandrao Dhulap, who built two additional gates on the northern and eastern sides of the temple. The eastern gate was built by making a way or Ghati by cutting a small hill adjoining the temple on the eastern side. He also built the main entrance or the Mukhya Pravesh Dwar for the temple. A huge bell hangs on the eastern gate which has the year 1791 engraved on it. This bell was the one that was brought from a Portuguese Ship that was captured by the Maratha Navy. The main wooden mast of this ship has been installed in front of the Main entrance of the temple at the beginning of the Temple Ghati.

== Mahashivratri Fair ==
A fair is held for six days in the month of Magha every year and is attended by about 5,000 people from nearby villages and towns. The fair starts five days before the day of worship. On the Mahashivratri day, devotees observe fast and stay awake all night. Mahashivratri marks the night when Shiva performed the 'Tandava'. It is also believed that on this day Shiva was married to Parvati Ma. On this day Shiva devotees observe fast and offer fruits, flowers and Bael leaves on Shiva Linga.

== Wall Paintings ==
The walls of the temple show drawings depicting events from the Ramayana and Mahabharata. These drawings were created by artists appointed by Sardar Sambhaji Angre. They are unique in the sense that although they depict stories from the ancient Vedic culture, the characters' clothes, weapons, ornaments and other equipment and instruments are similar to those found in the 18th century.

Images showing wall paintings on the temple building
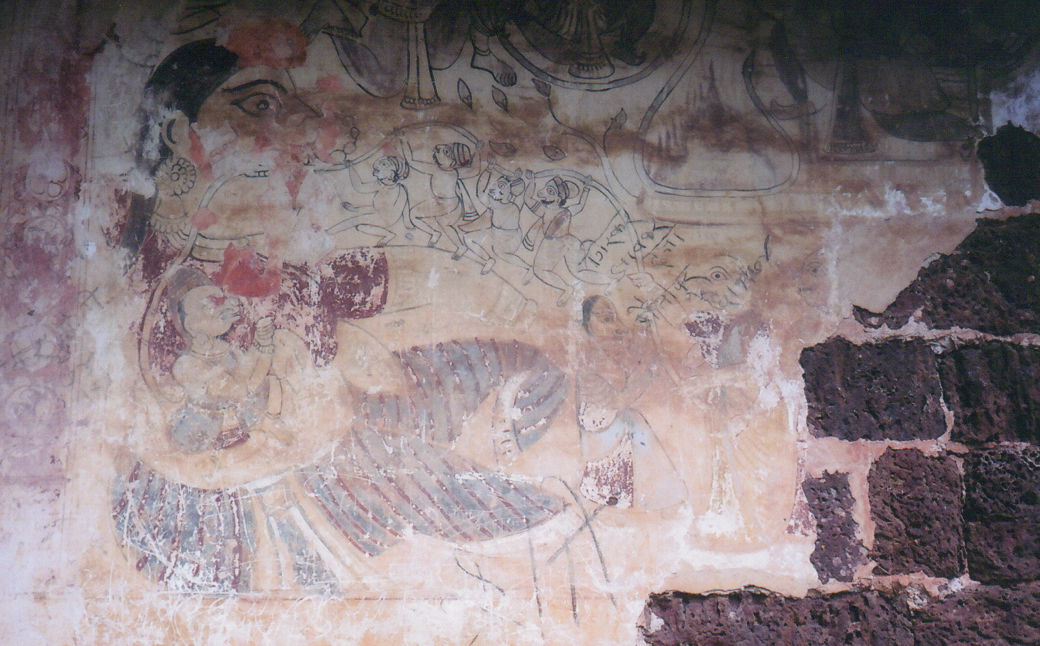
Wall Painting Vedic

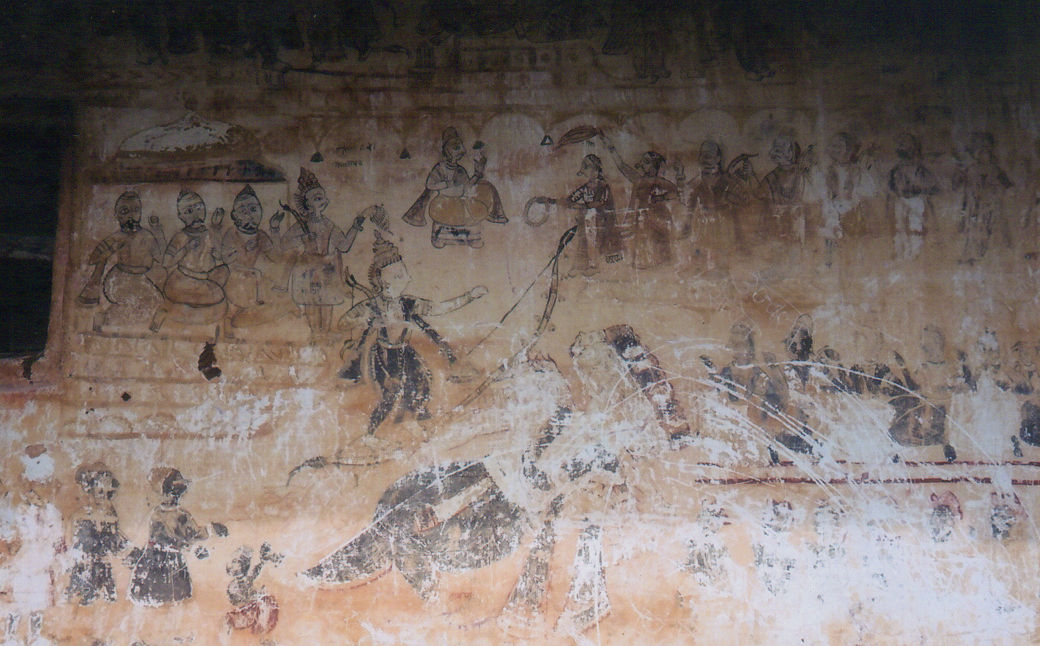
Wall Painting Ramayana

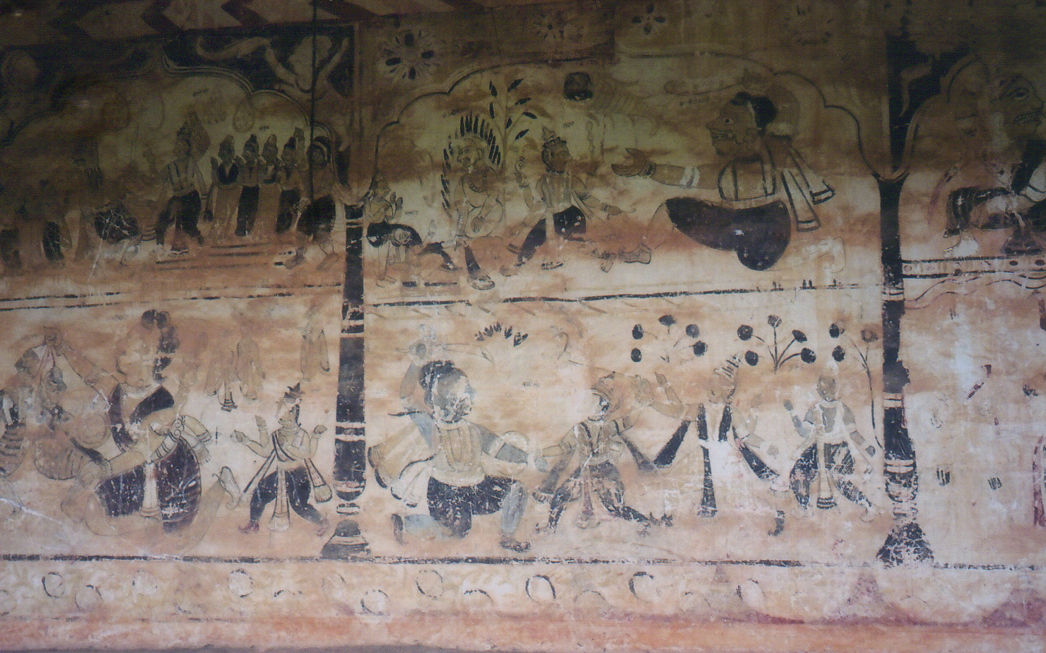
Wall Painting Mahabharata

== Administration ==
The management of the temple at present rests with trustees five in number, appointed by the Civil Court in 1914. The temple and its welfare is looked after by Shri Dev Rameshwar Devasthan Vishwasta Mandal and Rameshwar Vikas Mandal, Mumbai. This Devasthan holds inam land and also a cash allowance of Rs. 334 per year from Government. The trustees have repaired the temple from time to time since 1914. The temple at present is in good condition and is being renovated.

== Sarkhel Sambhaji Angre Samadhi ==
A tomb (samadhi) of Sarkhel Sambhaji Angre is located just outside the Southern gate of the temple premises. It is made up of stones and is around 200–250 years old. Along with him, seven small stones have also been placed inside and outside the tomb to represent his wives.

Sarkhel Sambhaji Angre Samadhiii
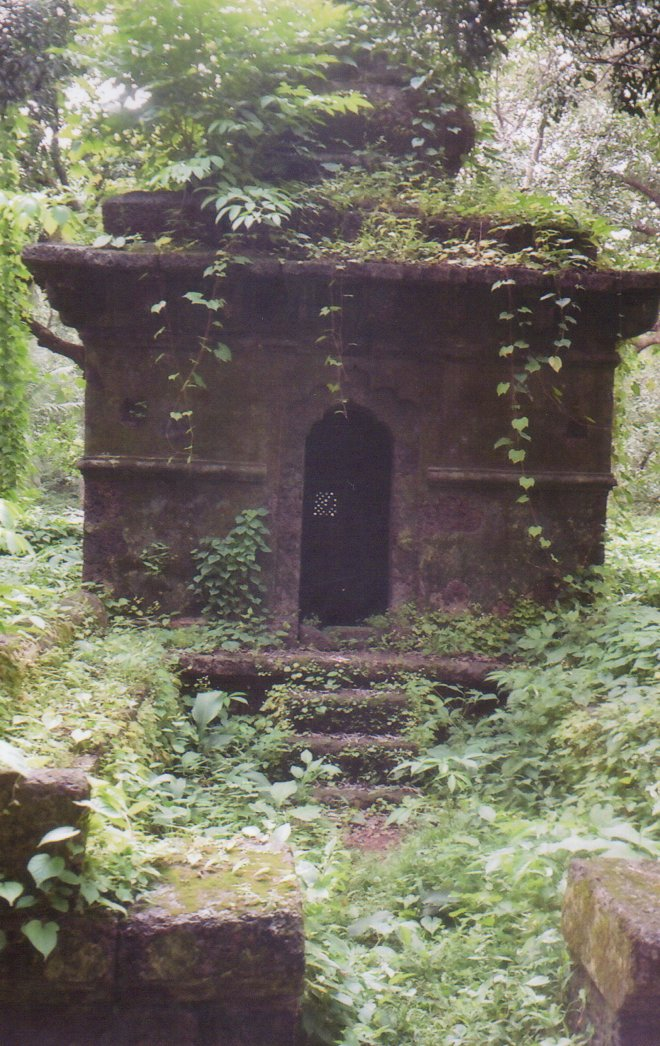
Sambhaji Angre Samadhi

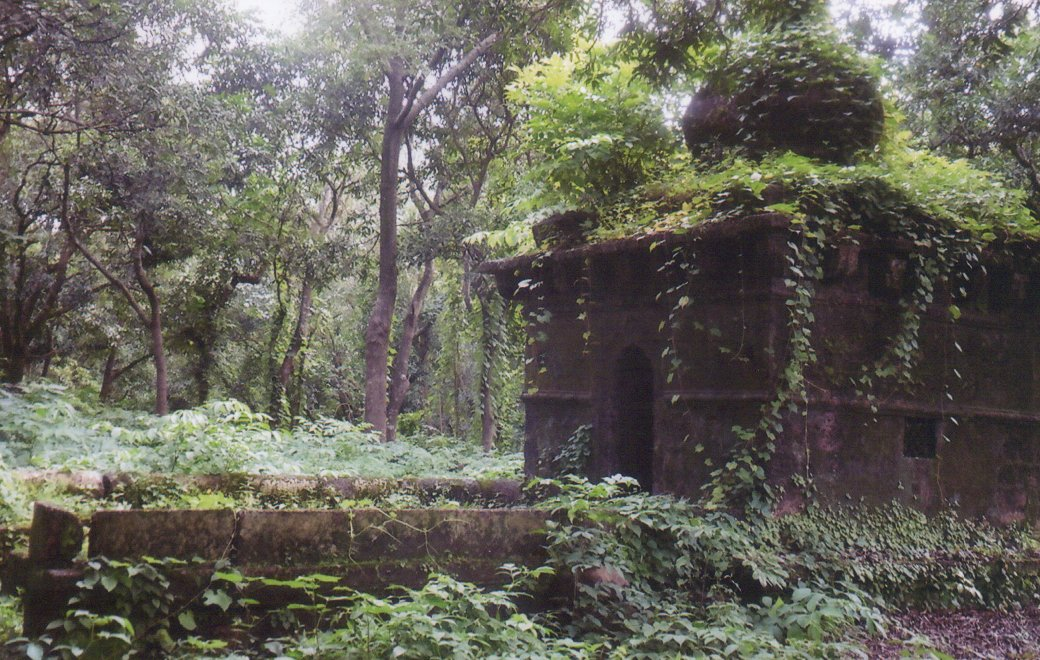
Sambhaji Angre Samadhi (Side View)

== Official Website ==
The official temple website is shridevrameshwar.org. This site is managed by Green Earth Web Developers, Mumbai under the guidance of temple management. The site provides important links to blogs, encyclopaedic articles, images and contact information regarding the temple. It also hosts a number of places of interest in the surrounding region. The list of members which form the three different committees of the temple management is also provided. Over a period of few years there have been donations made for the development and refurbishment of the temple. The list of these donors is available on the official website of the temple.

== See also ==
- Alphonso (mango)
- Kanhoji Angre
- Pujare (clan)
- Rameshwar Wadi
- Vijaydurg (city)
- Vijaydurg Fort
- Rameshwar Dockyard
