= Alphonso mango =

Mango cultivar

Mangifera 'Alphonso'
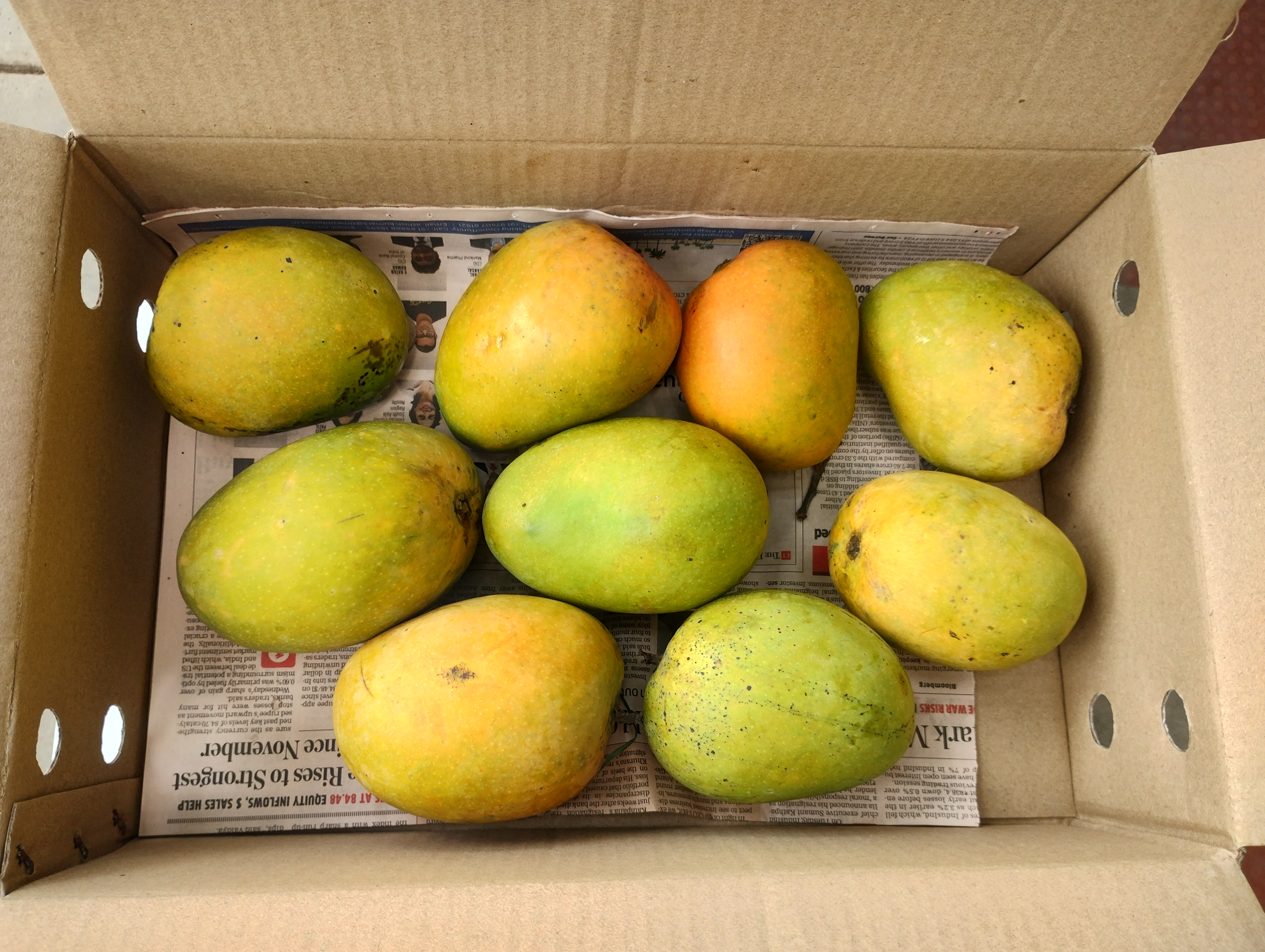
- Alphonso mangoes
- Genus: Mangifera
- Species: Mangifera indica
- Cultivar: 'Alphonso'
- Origin: India

The Alphonso mango is a named mango cultivar that originates from India. In the UK in 2012, it was considered one of the most prized mangoes, known for its saffron-coloured flesh and culinary uses in various dishes and desserts.

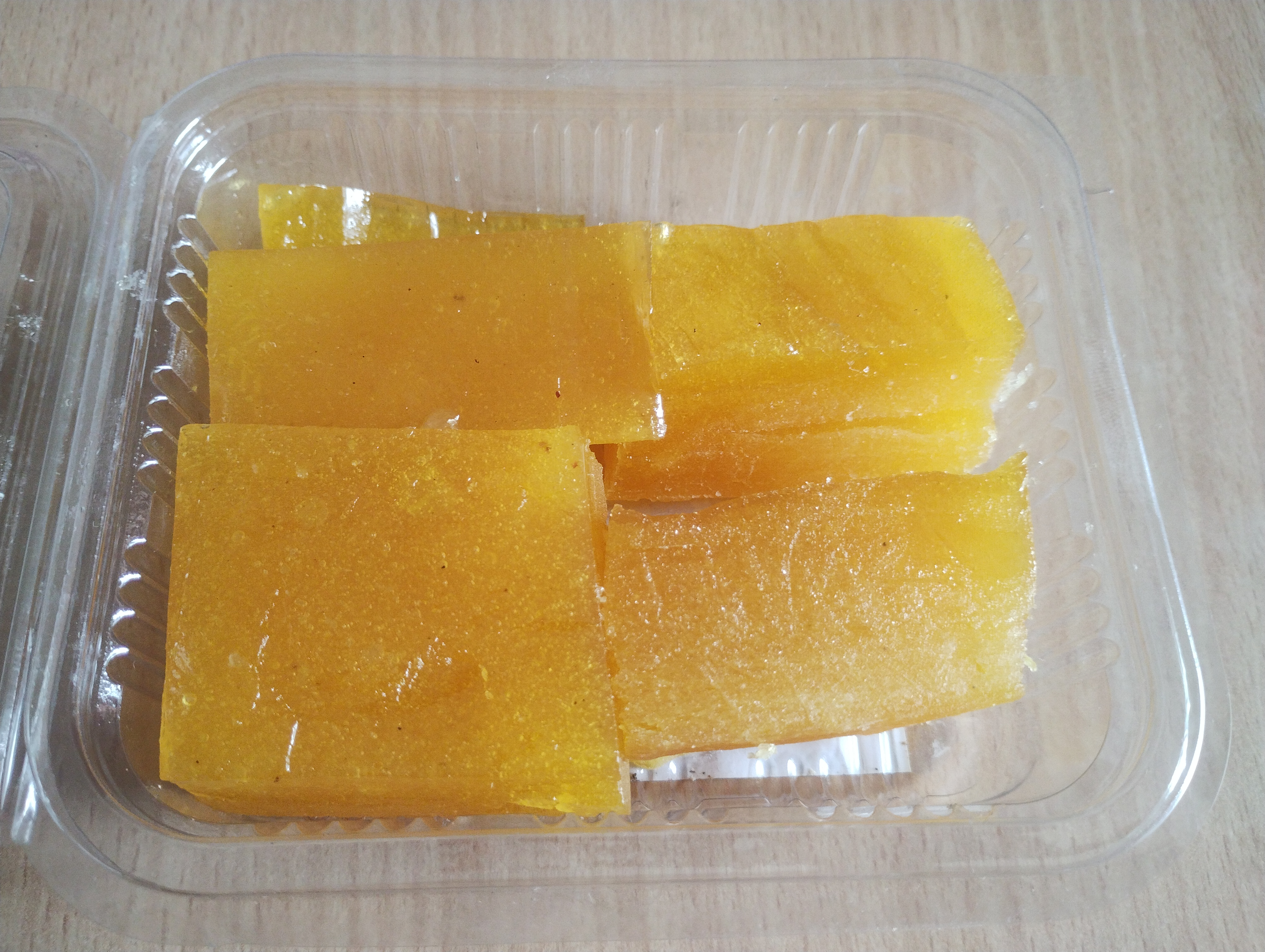
Alphonso mango pulp dish (above), Alphonso mango fruit cream sundae (below)

== Origin ==
The variety is named after Afonso de Albuquerque, a distinguished militarian and viceroy of Portuguese India from 1509 to 1515. Jesuit missionaries introduced grafting on mango trees in Portuguese Goa, to produce varieties like Alphonso. The Portuguese loved the flavour of the fruit and replicated it using the grafting technique. Alphonso is also one of the most expensive varieties of mango, and is grown mainly in the Konkan region of western India - Maharashtra, Goa and Karnataka. It is grown in the Valsad and Navsari districts of South Gujarat.

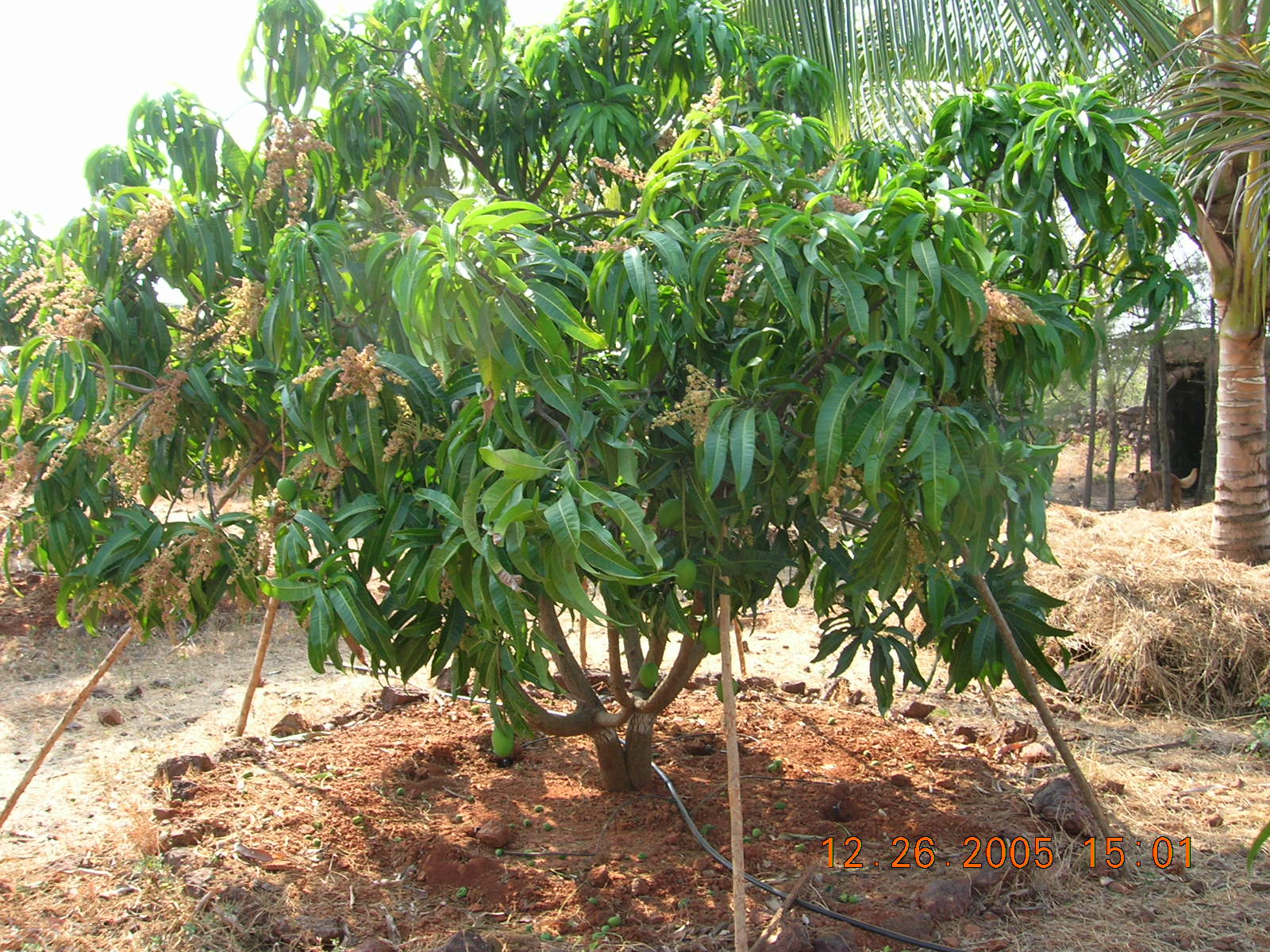
Alphonso mango tree

== Description ==
The Alphonso mango is a seasonal fruit harvested from end of March through the end of June. The time from flowering to harvest is about 90 days, while the time from harvest to ripening is about 15 days. The fruits generally weigh between 150 and 300 grams (5.3 and 10.6 oz), have a rich, creamy, tender texture and delicate, non-fibrous, juicy pulp. As the fruit matures, the skin of an Alphonso mango turns golden-yellow with a tinge of red across the top of the fruit.

=== Culinary ===
Mango sorbet, ice cream, lassi, soufflé, mousse, and puree are some culinary preparations using Alphonso mangoes.

== Trade ==
The Alphonso is prized in domestic and international markets for its taste, fragrance and bright color. It is exported to various countries, including Japan, Korea and in Europe. Alphonso mangoes from the Konkan region of Maharashtra received a Geographical Indication Tag in 2018.

=== Import bans ===
An import ban imposed in 1989 by the United States on Indian mangoes, including the Alphonso, was lifted in April 2007. However, the mangoes needed to be treated before entering the country in order to stop the introduction of non-native fruit flies, destructive fungi, and other pests that could harm American agriculture. The European Union imposed a ban beginning in April 2014 on import of mangoes after finding "non-European fruit flies" in some consignments, creating a significant threat to UK salad crops. The Indian government had described this decision as arbitrary and businesses claimed they would suffer financial losses due to the ban.

In January 2015, the European Commission lifted the ban following significant improvements in the Indian mango export system.
