= List of villages in Dapoli taluka =

This is a list of villages in the taluka of Dapoli in Ratnagiri, Maharashtra, India.

- Ade
- Adkhal
- Agarvayangani
- Aghari
- Ambavali Bk
- Ambavali Kh
- Anjarla
- Apti
- Asond
- Asud
- Atgaon
- Awashi
- Bandhativare
- Bhadavale
- Bhanghar
- Bhatghar
- Bhati
- Bhomadi
- Bhopan
- Bondivali
- Borghar
- Borivali
- Borthal
- Brahmanwadi
- Burondi
- Chandikanagar
- Chandivane
- Chandranagar
- Chikhalgaon
- Chinchali
- Dabhil
- Dalkhan
- Damame
- Dauli
- Degaon
- Dehen
- Derde
- Devke
- Dhankoli
- Dr. Iqubalnagar
- Dumdeo
- Ganpatipule
- Gaontale
- Gavhe
- Gavrai
- Gudaghe
- Harnai
- Hatip
- Ilane
- Inampangari
- Jamge
- Juikar Mohalla
- Kadivali
- Kalambat
- Kalanagar
- Kalki
- Kangavai
- Karajgaon
- Karanjali
- Karanjani
- Karde
- Katran
- Kawadoli
- Kelashi
- Kelil
- Kharavate
- Kherdi
- Kinhal
- Kolbandre
- Kolthare
- Kondhye
- Kongle
- Kudavale
- Kumbhave
- Ladghar
- Lonvadi
- Mahalunge
- Mahamaynagar
- Malvi
- Mandivali
- Mathegujar
- Matwan
- Mauje
- Mele
- Mugij
- Murdi
- Murud
- Nante
- Nargoli
- Navase
- Navashi
- Nawanagar
- Nigade
- Olgaon
- Onanvase
- Oni
- Pachavali
- Padale
- Palgad
- Panchanadi
- Panderi
- Pandhari
- Pangari Tarf Haveli
- Panhale Kazi
- Pavnal
- Phansu
- Pharare
- Pichadoli
- Pisai
- Pophalwane
- Rajapur
- Rawtoli
- Revali
- Rowale
- Rukhi
- Sadavali
- Sadave
- Sahilnagar
- Sakhaloli
- Sakurde
- Saldure
- Samsher Ali Nagar
- Sarang
- Satamba
- Satere Tarf Haveli
- Satere Tarf Natu
- Shiravane
- Shirde
- Shirkenagar
- Shirkhal
- Shirsadi
- Shirseshwar
- Shirshinge
- Shirsoli
- Shital Nagar
- Shivajinagar(1)
- Shivajinagar(2)
- Shivajinagar(3)
- Shiwnari
- Sondeghar
- Soveli
- Sukondi
- Tadachakond
- Tadil
- Talsure
- Tamastirth
- Tamond
- Tangar
- Teleshwarnagar
- Terevayangani
- Tetavali
- Turavade
- Umbarghar
- Umbarle
- Umbarshet
- Unhavare
- Urphi
- Usgaon
- Utambar
- Vanand
- Vanoshi Tarf Natu
- Vanoshi Tarf Panchanadi
- Velvi
- Virsai
- Visapur
- Visharantinagar
- Wadavali
- Waghave
- Waghivane
- Wakavali
- Walane
- Wanzloli
- Wavghar
