= Aade =

Village in Maharashtra

- village
- Location in Maharashtra, India Aade (India)
- Coordinates: 17°59′N 73°15′E
- Country: India
- State: Maharashtra
- District: Ratnagiri district

Languages
  - Official: Marathi
- Time zone: UTC+5:30 (IST)
- PIN: 415717
- Telephone code: 0-2358
- Vehicle registration: MH-08
- Nearest city: Anjarle, Kelshi, Utambar, Dapoli, Karde, Asud, Harnai, Mandangad, Velas, Bankot, Shrivardhan
- Website: www.paryatan.net/paryatan/aade.aspx

Aade (or Ade) is very small village in Dapoli Taluka and Ratnagiri district of Maharashtra, India. It is well connected and exactly in between Kelshi and Anjarle.

== Specialities ==
Aade is famous for the ancient temple of Lord Parshurama called Bhargavram. Every year on the occasion of Akshay Trutiya (अक्षय तृतीया) Aadekars gather together to celebrate the Bhargavram Yatra. Similar to Kelshi, Aade coastline is also covered by the small sand dune.

== Climate ==
Weather is very humid. The winters are very cold.

== Transportation ==
From Mangaon on Bombay Goa highway 10km towards Goa take the right turn at Lonere Phata for the road towards Shriwardhan. From Dapoli, take the way towards Anjarle, cross the crick bridge and 4km to reach to Aade on the road towards Kelshi.
