= 鬼 (disambiguation) =

鬼 may refer to:

- Radical 194 in the Kangxi Dictionary
- Ghosts in Chinese culture
- a demon in Japanese culture, see Oni
- in traditional Chinese astronomy, an asterism in the modern constellation of Cancer, see Ghost (Chinese constellation)

== See also ==
- Oni (disambiguation)
- Foreign devil
