= Mandangad =

Village in Maharashtra

- Village
- Location in Maharashtra, India Mandangad (India)
- Coordinates: 17°59′N 73°15′E
- Country: India
- State: Maharashtra
- District: ratnagiri

Population (2011)
  - Total: 2,911

Languages
  - Official: Marathi
- Time zone: UTC+5:30 (IST)
- PIN: 415203
- Telephone code: 0-2350
- Vehicle registration: MH-08
- Nearest city: Mangaon

Mandangad (or Mandangadh or Mandangarh) is the headquarters of Mandangad taluka the northmost taluka in Ratnagiri district of Maharashtra, India.

== Description ==
Mandangad is the taluka (tehsil) headquarters in Ratnagiri district of Maharashtra state in India. The heart of Mandangad is Mandangad fort.

The village is situated at the extreme north of Ratnagiri District. In terms of geographical features, its area is about 43,100 Hectares, altitude is 882 feet (268 metres), latitude 17.9833 and longitude 73.2500. Time zone is UTC+5.30. Average rainfall in the taluka is 3996 mm. Mandangad is a hilly coastal zone. Mandangad is 175 km from Ratnagiri, 170 km from Pune and 210 km from Mumbai. It is connected by road. The nearest major town is Mangaon in Raigad District on Mumbai-Goa National Highway No. 66 . The Arabian Sea is about 35 km from Mandangad.

== History ==
Overlooking the small town of Mandangad is a two-peaked hill fort also known by the same name i.e. Mandangad (also called Chitradurga fort). Mandangad fort doesn't find much of a mention in history books. In fact, it is one of the very old forts in the region with data suggesting that Mandangad was built in the 12th century during the reign of the Shilahara dynasty. It was built by King Bhoja II. In 1661 it was under an Adilshahi Sardar(Knight) Jaswantrao Dalvi, the person who besieged Vishalgad during Shivaji Maharaj's daring escape from Panhalgad.

When Shivaji Maharaj defeated kartalabhkhan and was marching towards Dabhol, Mandangad was along the way. Hearing this news, Jaswantrao Dalvi ran away to Shingarpur and Shivaji maharaj took Mandangad without a fight. It was held by Kanhoji Angre before captured by British in 1818.

Mandangad and Bankot forts were built to safeguard the trade route through the Savitri River, which was an important trade route. The mazar of Saint Dawood Khan {R.A} and many Muslim graves are there. A Ganapati Temple and two ponds are present inside the fort. This tank is known as "Thorla Talao" (Big Lake

== Climate ==
As Mandangad is located on a higher level than the sea, the weather is not that humid. The winters are really very cold.

== Transportation ==
Mandangad is a junction where all the ST buses coming from Mumbai/ Thane/ Pune etc. and going to Kolhapur, Miraj, Khed, Dapoli, Bankot, Kelshi, Mhapral, Mahad, Velas, etc. halt.

== Nearest Railway Stations ==
Karanjadi - 27 km. Veer - 35 km. Mangaon - 45 km Khed - 50 km

== Nearest Airports ==
Lohegaon, Pune - 107 km. Chhatrapati Shivaji Maharaj International Airport, Mumbai - 144 km. Kolhapur - 208 km.

== Tourist sites ==
The places worth visiting in and around Mandangad town are (a) Mandangad fort (b) Velas (c) Bankot or Himmatgad Fort (d) Kelshi Beach (Dapoli taluka) (e) Panderi (f) Ambavade and (g) Palgadh (Dapoli taluka).

1. Velas – The coastal place Velas is at the distance of about 36 km from Mandangad. The unique Marine Turtle Conservation Festival is celebrated here. The festival is aimed at conservation of marine turtles. Velas is also the birthplace of Nana Phadanvis alias Balaji Janardan Bhanu, who was the influential personality in the history of Maratha Empire. Nana Phadanvis House and Mahalaxmi Temple are the main attractions in Velas. Gokulashtami Festival is an important event for Velas people.
2. Bankot or Himmatgad Fort - is also called Victoria Fort. The River Savitri approaches the sea at Bankot. Bankot’s importance is also associated with the holy place Harihareshwar in neighboring Raigad District. From Bankot (Hanuman Tekdi), ferry boats or jetties are available up to Bagmandla in Raigad district; from where tourists can reach Harihareshwar temple by auto rickshaws / S.T.Buses.
3. The RadhaKrishna Temple, Gokulgaon - The Radha Krishna Temple which has been built in the recent year is gaining attraction among the tourists. The lucrative idols of RadhaKrishna Temple with peaceful atmosphere make place, top on the tourist list.
4. The Khemnath Temple, Borghar - The popular story of temple Khemnath the Avtar of Mahadev. once said he was found by a farmer while farming in his farms, after which it was established and till now he is protecting the villagers from all the paranormal activities. it also has Lord Hanuman Temple and very famous for Shimga Mahotsav every year
5. Kelshi Beach (Dapoli taluka) – Kelshi is a small village in neighbouring Dapoli Taluka. Along the Mahalakshmi temple, Kelshi has got a scenic and unfamiliar beach, which is a very calm and quiet place. Another place worth visiting here is Uttambar.
6. Panderi – Panderi is the important irrigation project on the Savitri River in Mandangad taluka. Apart from the agricultural importance of the dam, of late, Panderi has become a picnic spot. Also found here Pandava Cave.
7. Ambavade – this is a native place of Dr. Babasaheb Ambedkar, the Chief Architect of the Indian Constitution, which is about 20 km from Mandangad. There is a monument in this village in commemoration of Dr. Ambedkar.
8. Palgad (Dapoli taluka) – This is the place where the Marathi author, freedom fighter and social activist Pandurang Sadashiv Sane, known as Sane Guruji, was born. His works in Marathi literature includes Shyamchi Aai (Shyam's Mother) and Dhadapadanari Mule (Struggling Children).
9. Unhavare - there is a source of warm water located in village name which is almost 23 km away from mandnagad, where u can reach by S.T. buses or any private taxi, these warm water lake stays warm in all the season, there is also a waterfall name SAVAT KADA in nearest village PALAVNI. It is quite a silent place where you can get peace.
10. Kelshi - is about 37 km from Mandangadh. There is a village known Daira. Shivaji Maharaj's 11th spiritual teacher {Guru} Baba Yaqoob Khan Saharvardi's Mazar is there on the bank of the Arabian sea.
11. Dahagaon Shree Uttareshwar Temple - Dahagaon is a small village located in Mandangad on the way from Mandangad to Dapoli. Dahagaon is known for the famous temple of Swayambhu Shree Uttareshwar, Lord Shiva. Tripuri Paurnima, Ganeshotsav and Shimga (Holi) festivals are celebrated here.
12. Shree RadhaKrishna Temple - Gokulgaon is known for the famous temple of Supreme Lord Shree RadhaKrishna.
13. Latvan in Bhairi Bhavani Mandir And Hanuman Mandir # ahiri Bhavani Navsala Pavnari Dev.
14. Takede : Beautiful Waterfalls in rainy season.
15. Aasavale : This is a village situated between Panderi and Aambadave. There is Shiva's awakened (jaagrut) temple which is called as "Shri Kshetrapal". The people of this village celebrate Mahashivratri and Holi which are famous in Mandangad.
16. Mhapral : Bhuwani Aapreshwar Mahapraleshwar Mandir near Mhapral Kumbharli gaon which is one of the " Tirthkshetra " like ( Trambkeshwar and Hariharshwar )
17. Tide : Tide Village is one of big village in Manadangad Taluka which is 4 km from Mandangad Dapoli Road & near to Kumbale Village. Tide Dam and Bhairi Bhavani Mandir is the attraction of visitors. Ganeshotsav, Shimga (Holi) and Navratrotsav festivals are celebrated here.

== Villages in Mandangad Taluka ==
1. Aatle
2. Adakhal
3. Aasavale
4. Ambadawe
5. Ambavali
6. Ambavane bk
7. Ambavane khurd
8. Bahiravali
9. Bamanrghar chokki
10. Bankot
11. Borkhat
12. Bhingloli
13. Bholavali
14. Borghar
15. Buri
16. Chinchali (Mahpral)
17. Panhali Khurd
18. Chinchghar
19. Dabhat
20. Dahagaon 114 A/3B/1

7/12 Utara

1. Devhare keril
2. Dahimbe
3. Dhangar
4. Dhutroli
5. Dudhere
6. Gharadi (Known for its Ganesh Mandir in Ganesh Wadi)
7. Ghosale -Buddha Wadi, Ratambe Wadi, Ganesh Wadi. (EK AADARSH GAV)
8. Ghote
9. Gothe-Khalati
10. Gokulgaon
11. Govele
12. Ghumari
13. Javale
14. Kadvan
15. kelvat
16. Khudak Kh.
17. Kondgaon
18. Konhavli
19. Konzar
20. Kumbale
21. keril
22. Latvan
23. Lokarvan
24. Mahu-Borghar
25. Mandangad
26. Mhapral Mohlla
27. Muradpur
28. Nargoli
29. Nigadi
30. Nighavani
31. Nayane
32. Panhali Khurd
33. Padave
34. Palavani
35. Pale Gaon
36. Pale(PALEKONDWADI)
37. Palghar
38. Panderi
39. pacharal
40. Pat
41. Peve
42. Pimploli
43. Pipalgaon
44. Sade
45. Savari
46. Shedwai
47. Sheegavan
48. Shenale
49. Shirgaon
50. Soveli
51. Surle
52. Takede
53. Takvali
54. Tide
55. Teleghar
56. Tamhane
57. Tondali
58. Tulashi ( EK AADARSH GAV )
59. Umaroli
60. Umbarshet
61. Unhavare
62. Vakavali Buddhawadi
63. Velas
64. Valmikinagar
65. Valote
66. Veenhe
67. Veral
68. Vesavi
69. Kumbharli ( Mhapral )
