= APTI =

APTI may refer to:

- Alaska Public Telecommunications, Inc.
- Advanced Power Technologies, Inc.
- Asociación Panameña de Traductores e Intérpretes, Panamanian member organization of the International Federation of Translators
- A Passage to India, book and film
- Apti, Maharashtra, a small village in Maharashtra state in Western India
- Association for Preservation Technology International
- Apti Alaudinov, commander of the 141st Motorized Regiment of the National Guard of Russia
