= Oni (disambiguation) =

Oni (鬼) are ogres or demons in Japanese folklore.

Oni may also refer to:

- Oni (band), a Canadian progressive metal band
- Oni Press, an independent comic book publisher
- Ooni, the kings of Nigeria's Yoruba people
- Oni–Adil, Indian composer duo
- Miye Oni (born 1997), American basketball player
- Oni Gozen, a Japanese female warrior from the 16th century
- Oni, Maharashtra, a small village in Western India
- Oni, Georgia, a town in Georgia
- Oni (letter), the 16th letter of the three Georgian scripts
- Oni: Thunder God's Tale, stop-motion series
- Oni (video game), a 2001 third-person action video game made by Bungie
- Adesuwa Oni (born 1989), British actress
- Onimusha, a series of action video games made by Capcom
- Oni Aliens, foes in the Gantz manga
- Oni, the title of an unfinished Akira Kurosawa script that was later adapted to a video game named Nioh
- Oni, a race of aliens from the manga and anime Urusei Yatsura
- The Oni, a primary antagonist in seasons 8-10 of the TV series Ninjago
- Oni (Street Fighter), an alternate form of Akuma that appears in the Super Street Fighter IV: Arcade Edition video game
- Oni, an antagonist in the Mortal Kombat: Shaolin Monks video game
- My Oni Girl, a 2024 anime film by Studio Colorido

ONI may refer to:

- Office of Naval Intelligence, the United States Navy's intelligence agency
- Office of National Intelligence, an Australian government intelligence agency
- OpenNet Initiative, a project for tracking the use of Internet filtering and surveillance
- ONI Systems Corporation, an optical networking company acquired by Ciena Corporation in 2002
- ONI (Oxford Nanoimaging), a super-resolution microscope company
- Oxygen Not Included, a simulation video game by Klei Entertainment
- OASIS Neural Interface, a VR technology system used in Ready Player Two
- Oceanic Niño Index, the numerical metric for El Niño used by the U. S government's NOAA
