= Nigade =

Nigade may refer to:

- Nigade, Mawal, Pune district, Maharashtra, India
- Nigade, Ratnagiri, Maharashtra, India
