= Bankot fort =

Fort in Maharashtra, India

Bankot Fort
- Part of Malabar sea coast
- Ratnagiri district, Maharashtra
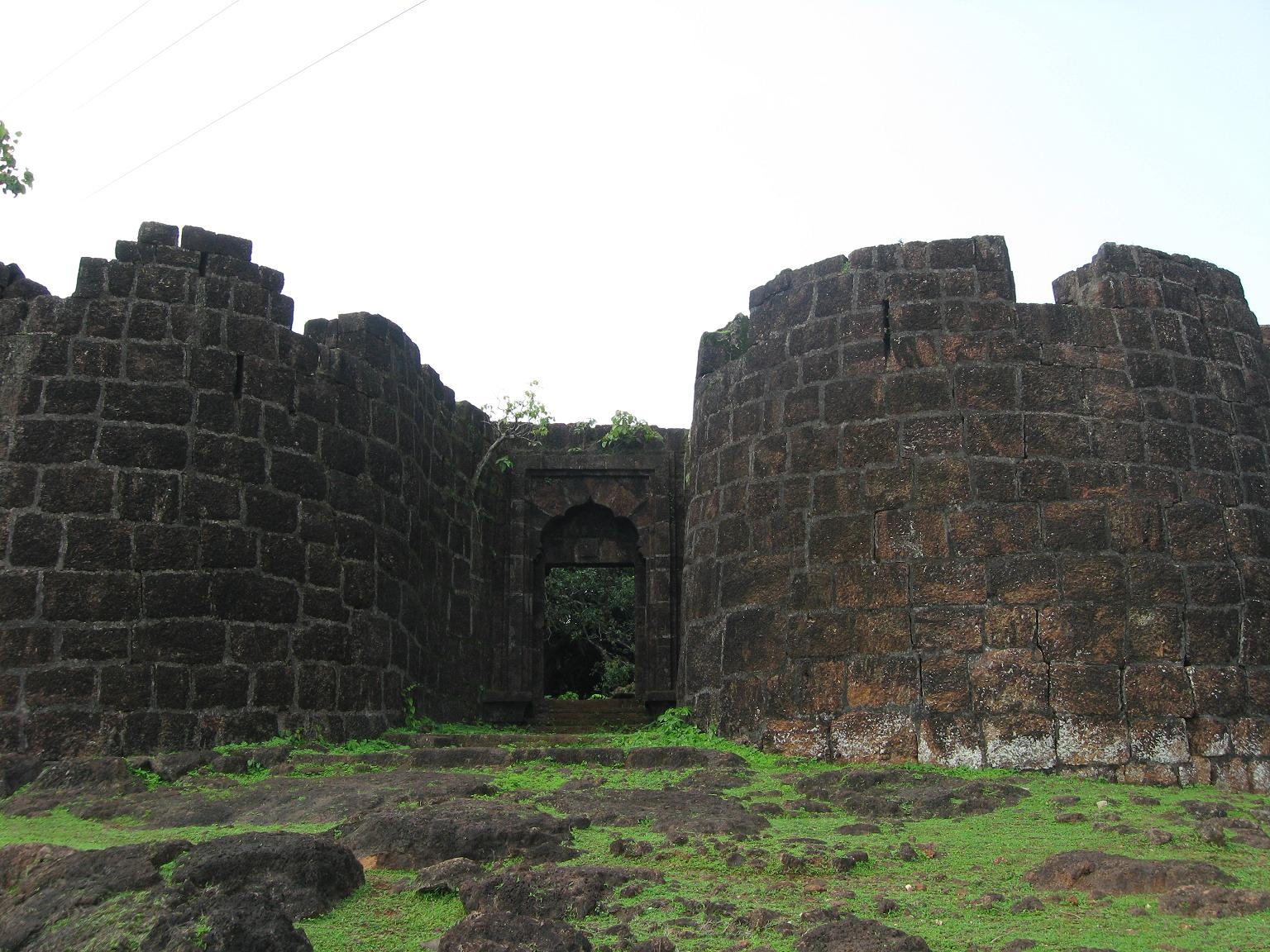

Site information
- Type: Sea fort
- Owner: India Government of India
- Controlled by: Bijapur (-1548); Portugal (1548-1699); Janjira State (1699-1713); Maratha Empire (1713-1755); United Kingdom: East India Company (1755-1857); British Raj (1857-1947); India (1947-)
- Open to the public: Yes
- Condition: Ruins

Location
- Shown within Maharashtra
- Coordinates: 17°58′23.6″N 73°02′33.1″E
- Height: 300 Ft.

Site history
- Materials: Stone

Bankot Fort / Himmatgad Fort/ Fort Victoria is a fort located 47 km from Dapoli, in Ratnagiri district, of Maharashtra. This fort is an important fort in Ratnagiri district. The Fort is located on a prominent and commanding point for guarding the trade route along the Savitri River, which runs till, Mahad which was a busy route in medieval times. It is a fort located on a hill near the sea.

== History ==
First record evidence about this fort is found in the records of Greek geographer Ptolemy in first century AD. It was then called as Mandargiri or Mandagora. The Chinese traveller Hieun Tsang is supposed to have embarked in Bankot in 640 AD. This fort was captured by the Portuguese from Mohammed Adil Shah of Bijapur in 1548. It was won by Maratha Koli Admiral Kanhoji Angre in 1700 and named "Himmatgad". With Tulaji Angre raiding territories belonging to Chhatrapati Shahu and his noblemen, a rivalry between Tulaji Angre and the Peshwas ensued. After Tulaji ignored several warnings handed out to him to fall into line, the Peshwas allied with British and waged a war against Tulaji.

In 1755, this fort surrendered to Commodore James of British fleet after the fall of Suvarnadurg. British forces captured the fort and named it as Fort Victoria. Later it was revealed by the British that it was not an economically viable deal to maintain the fort and it was handed over to Peshwas. In 1837 the Mamlatdars office was moved from Bankot to Mandangad.

== How to reach ==
The nearest town is Harihareshwar which is 201 km from Mumbai and 194 km from Pune by road. The base village of the fort is Bankot which is 47 km from Dapoli and 21 km from Shrivardhan. To reach from Harihareshwar one has to avail the Bagmandala to Bankot base village ferry service to cross the Savitri river. There are good hotels at Dapoli and Shrivardhan. Now tea and snacks are also available in small hotels along the coastal road. The trekking path starts from the hillock west of the Bankot village. Now there is very safe and wide road up to the fort. It takes about half an hour to reach the entrance gate of the fort.

== Places to see ==
The fort is built by Lateritic rocks. Surrounding the fort is a moat dug up in the lateritic rock. There are two gates to the fort. The northern Entrance gate facing the Bankot creek is the main gate. The western gate opens up on a plateau. The main entrance has vestibules for the gate keepers. Climbing ahead is Nagarkhana which can be reached by climbing steps to view the Savitri river. From the western doorway, the bastion over the ramparts can be reached. There is a secret entrance near the Bastion. This Bastion was built by the Siddis to strengthen Bankot Fort. At Velas, there are two temples dedicated to Shri Rameshwar and Kalbhairav gods constructed by Moroba Dada Phadnis and Nana Phadnis respectively

The government of Maharashtra has undertaken the renovation of Bankot Fort and the work is in full progress.

== See also ==
- List of forts in Maharashtra
- List of forts in India
- Maritime history of Europe
- Kanhoji Angre
- Marathi People
- Portuguese India
- Maratha Navy
- List of Maratha dynasties and states
- Maratha War of Independence
- Battles involving the Maratha Empire
- Maratha Army
- Maratha titles
- Military history of India
