= Ilane =

Ilane may refer to:

- iLane, portable, in-car telematics, infotainment platform
- Ilane, Maharashtra, village in Ratnagiri district India
- Ilane Touré (born 2006), French footballer
