= Revali (disambiguation) =

Revali may refer to:

- Revali, a character from The Legend of Zelda: Breath of the Wild and Hyrule Warriors video games
- Revali Mahotsav, India, a village in the Ratnagiri district, Maharashtra, India
- Revali Village, a settlement in Mhasala taluka, Raigad district, Maharashtra, India
