= Murud, Ratnagiri =

Village in Maharashtra

Murud
- Village
- Interactive map of Murud
- Coordinates: 17°46′29.80″N 73°7′5.34″E
- Country: India
- State: Maharashtra
- District: Ratnagiri

Population (2011)
  - Total: 1,662

Languages
  - Official: Marathi
- Time zone: UTC+5:30 (IST)

Murud is a village in the Ratnagiri district of Maharashtra, India. It is 420.92 hectares in size.

It is located in the Dapoli sub-district (taluka) of Ratnagiri district. Murud is commonly called Murud-Harnai to distinguish it from Murud-Janjira (near Alibag).

Murud is a growing tourist spot famous for its scenic beaches, ancient temples and medieval sea fort.

The social reformer Maharshi Dhondo Keshav Karve, Bharat Ratna was born here in 1858.

== Tourist attractions ==
Durga Devi Mandir and Murud Beach are the most famous landmarks in Murud.

Durga Devi Mandir's pillars and roof are carved out of wood with intricate figures and is delightfully painted in pastel shades. All pillars are different from each other. A huge metal bell, supposedly brought from the Vasai Fort by Chimaji Appa, is also on display.

Murud Beach is made of very soft sand and is safe for swimming. Activities like parasailing, dune buggy rides, camel rides, horse-cart rides, and water scooters are available. Dolphin-watching boats leave early in the morning to take tourists out into the sea to watch dolphins.

A museum housing rare photographs and articles used by Maharshi Karve is maintained by the Vaze family. Keshavraj Mandir in nearby Asud and Kadyavarcha Ganpati in nearby Anjarle are both worth a visit.

== Accommodations ==
MTDC resort and numerous private resorts are available within walking distance of the beach. Many bed-and-breakfast accommodations are also available under the MTDC scheme.
