= Chinchali =

Chinchali may refer to:

- Chinchali, Karnataka, a village in India
- Chinchali, Maharashtra, a village in India
