= Sathamba =

- village
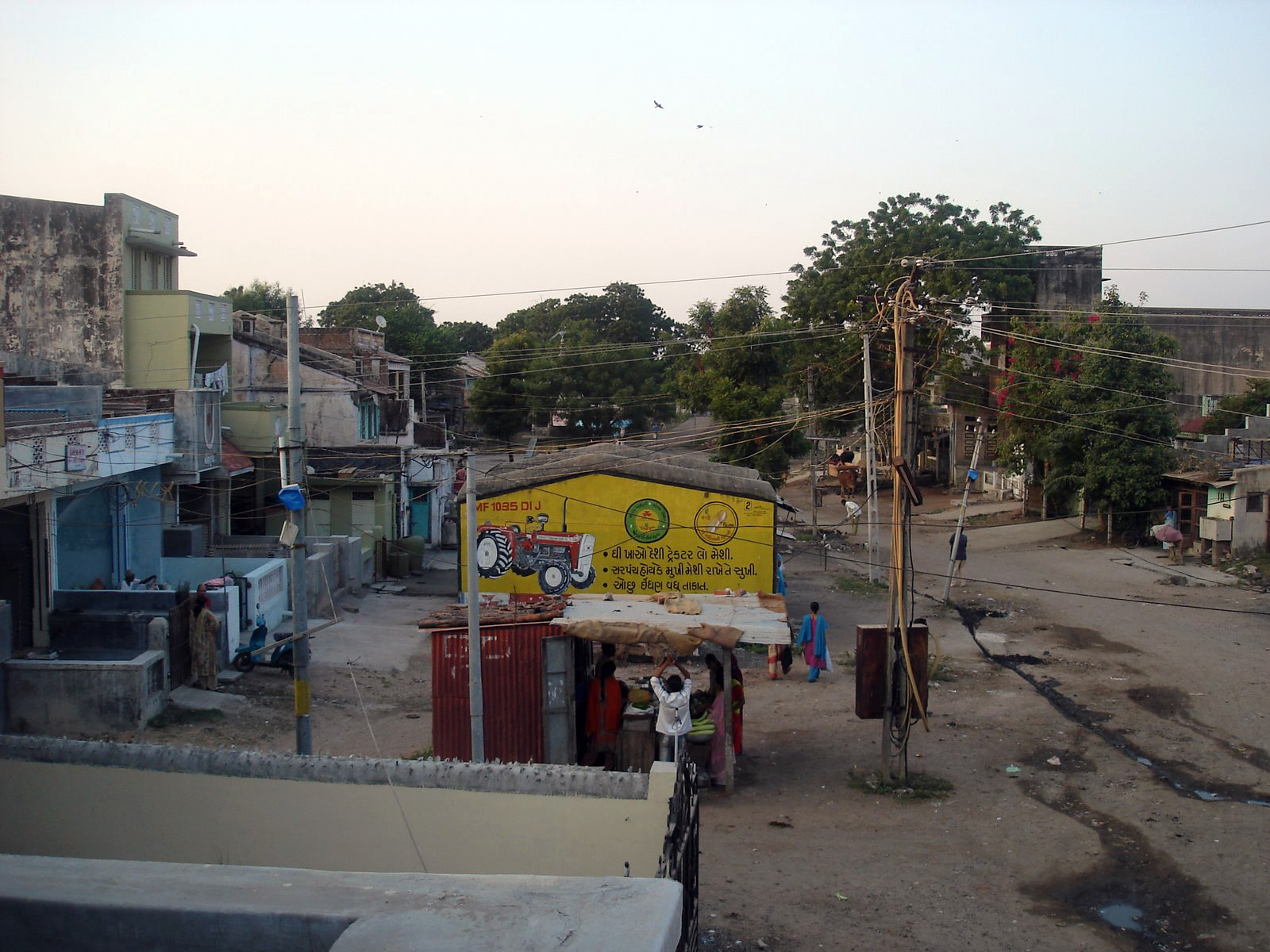
- Vav faliya, Azad Chowk

- Location in Gujarat, India Sathamba (India)
- Coordinates: 23.1691251°N 73.3266163°E
- Country: India
- State: Gujarat
- District: Aravali

Population
  - Total: 15,000

Languages
  - Official: Gujarati, Hindi
- Time zone: UTC+5:30 (IST)
- PIN: 383340
- Telephone code: 02779-28xxxx
- Vehicle registration: GJ-31
- Nearest city: Ahmedabad
- Lok Sabha constituency: Sabarkantha
- Vidhan Sabha constituency: Bayad
- Website: gujaratindia.com

Sathamba is a town located in Aravali district of the Indian state of Gujarat and the seat of a former petty princely state. It has a population of approximately 15,000.

== History ==
Sathamba was a princely state during the time of the British Raj. As such it had a population of 5,360 and an area of 470 square kilometres (180 mi^{2}) in 1892. It then formed part of the Mahi Kantha Agency. Thakore Saheb Shri Sursinhji Ratansinhji signed the Instrument of Accession to merge the State of Sathamba into the Indian Union on 10 June 1948, to newly independent India, the Privy Purse being fixed at 18,800 Rupees.

== Places of interest ==
The village has a stepwell and a memorial stone with an inscription dated to 1269 AD {LAKHA VANZARA NI VAV} (Samvat 1325).

== Economy ==
The major source of income for families is agriculture. There is also work in the quarry & stone crushing businesses surrounding the village, which comprise more than 30 companies. As of 2007, the previously well-known cotton ginning and pressing factory of the village was struggling as a consequence of a series of annual droughts.

== See also ==
- Satamba, in Maharashtra
