= Pewe =

Village in Maharashtra

- Village
- Interactive map of Pewe
- Country: India
- State: Maharashtra

Pewe is a small village in Ratnagiri district, Maharashtra state in Western India. The 2011 Census of India recorded a total of 1,143 residents in the village, with 310 households. Pewe's geographical area is 589 hectares (1,460 acres). Its Taluka name is Mandangad.
