= Awashi =

Village in Maharashtra

- Village
- Interactive map of Awashi
- Coordinates: 17°53′33″N 73°16′26″E
- Country: India
- State: Maharashtra

Awashi is a small village in Ratnagiri district, Maharashtra state in Western India. The 2011 Census of India recorded a total of 509 residents in the village. Awashi's geographical area is 647 hectares (1,600 acres). Awashi is approximately 1,200 km away in a southwestern direction from India's capital New Delhi.

== See also ==
- Awashi Dam
