= Bankot =

Bankot Bawan-kot
- village
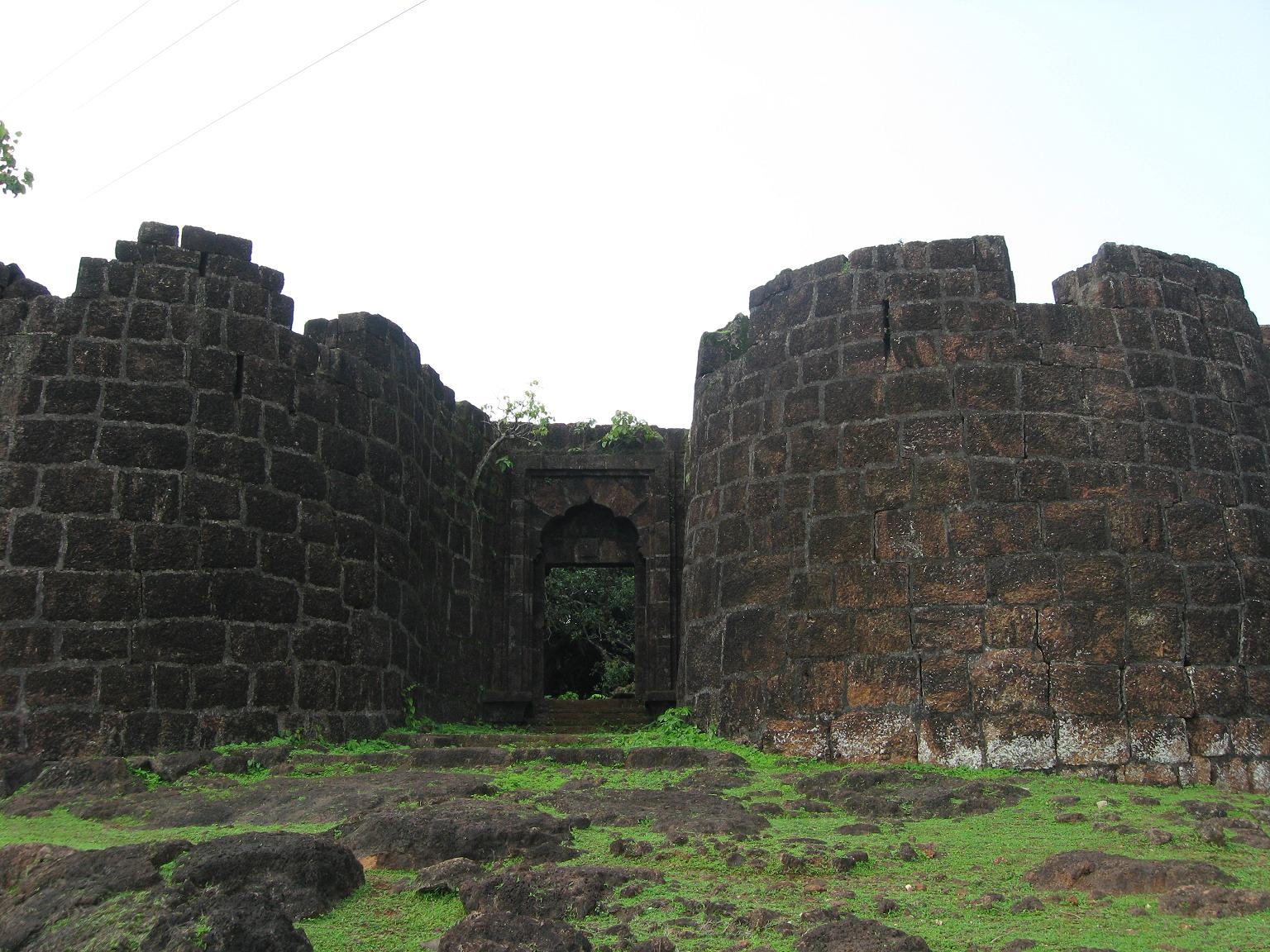
- Bankot fort
- Nickname: BKT
- Location in Maharashtra, India
- Coordinates: 17°59′0″N 73°3′0″E
- Country: India
- State: Maharashtra
- District: Ratnagiri
- Elevation: 46 m (151 ft)

Languages
  - Official: Marathi
- Time zone: UTC+5:30 (IST)
- Telephone code: 02350
- Vehicle registration: MH-08
- Nearest city: Mahad, Mandangad, Shrivardhan
- Sex ratio: MlF ♂/♀
- Literacy: 100%%
- Climate: cool (Köppen)

Bankot is a town in Maharashtra, India. It became part of the Bombay Presidency in 1756.

Its most famous structure is Bankot Fort, which was the first residency of the British Raj in Southern Konkan.

== Business ==
Mango is one of the most important crops of this village, and mango trees occupy about 60 per-cent of the land used to cultivate fruit. Hill-slopes near the coast where drainage is assured and climatic conditions are ideal, present the most suitable site for mango cultivation. Cashew nut stands next in importance to mango and occupies nearly one-third of the area used to cultivate fruit. Banana and coconut are grown on a smaller scale.

Sand dredging and mining have been major businesses since the 20th century.

== Schools ==
1.German Parkar High School (Urdu)

2.Dr. A. R. Undre High School (English)

3.Undre college of commerce (English)

There are two kindergartens (Bal-wadi) for local kids (Urdu medium and Marathi medium. Literacy in Bankot is almost 99%

== Climate ==
The temperatures range from a minimum of 20 °C and can go up to around the 34 °C mark. Heavy rain and thunderstorms can be expected in monsoon season.

== Nearest railway station ==
Karanjadi - 59 km. Veer - 67 km. Mangaon - 87 km. Khed- 70 km

== Nearest airports ==
Lohagaon, Pune - 203 km. Chhatrapati Shivaji International Airport, Mumbai - 180 km. Kolhapur - 240 km. Ratnagiri - 150 km.
