= Karde =

Village in Maharashtra

Coordinates: 18°45′N 74°21′E

- Village
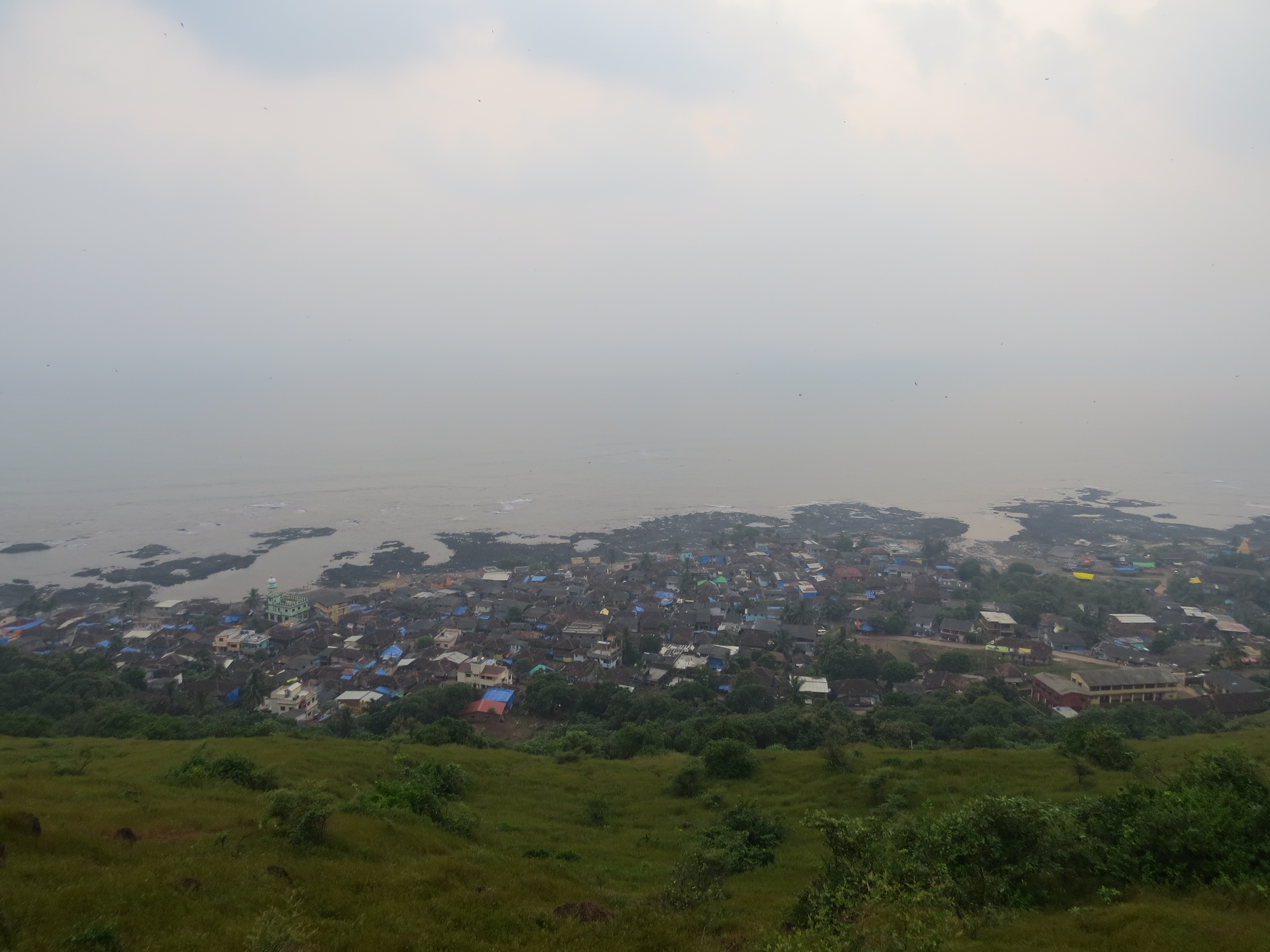
- Karde
- Interactive map of Karde
- Country: India
- State: Maharashtra

Area
  - Total: 780.20 ha (1,927.9 acres)

Population
  - Total: 1,084

Karde is a small village near the town of Dapoli, in Ratnagiri district, Maharashtra state in western India. The 2011 Census of India recorded a total of 1,084 residents in the village. The town covers an area of 780.20 hectares (1,927.9 acres).
