= Palgad =

Village in Maharashtra

Palgad Palghad
- village
- Location in Maharashtra, India Palgad (India)
- Coordinates: 17°49′59″N 73°19′41″E
- Country: India
- State: Maharashtra
- District: Ratnagiri

Languages
  - Official: Marathi
- Time zone: UTC+5:30 (IST)
- Vehicle registration: MH-

Palgad is a small village in Dapoli taluka, Ratnagiri district, Maharashtra state in Western India. It is between Mandangadh and Khed. The 2011 Census of India recorded a total of 2,959 residents in the village. Palgad's geographical area is approximately 1,526 hectares (3,770 acres).

Palgad is birth place of famous writer, activist Sane Guruji. His famous childhood memoir Shyamchi Aai is about his childhood life in Palgad.
