= Ambadawe =

Village in Maharashtra

- Village
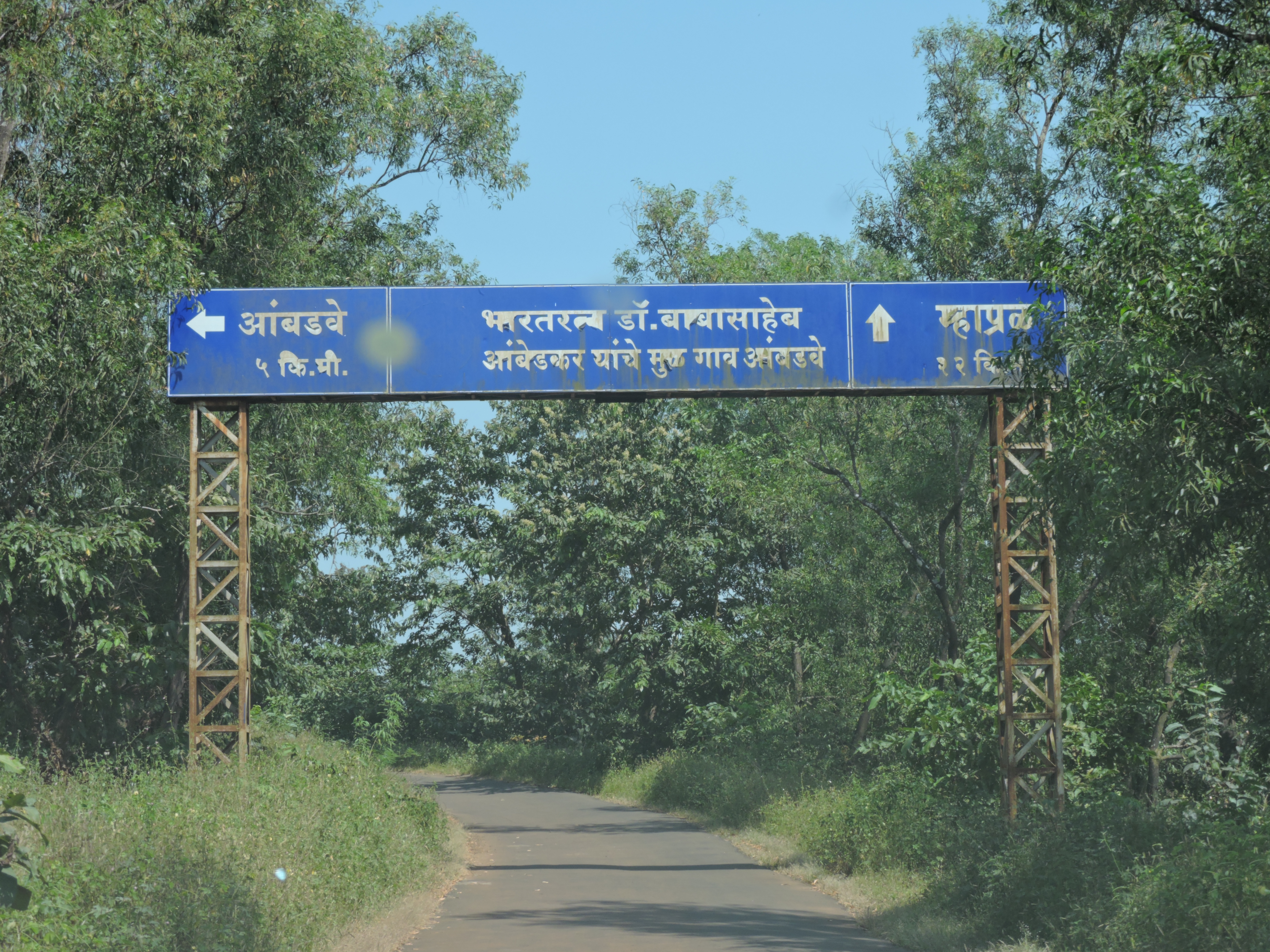
- Gate of Ambadave

- Location in Maharashtra, India Ambadawe (India)
- Coordinates: 18.017158°N 73.188997°E
- Country: India
- State: Maharashtra
- District: Ratnagiri district

Population (2011)
  - Total: 240

Languages
  - Official: Marathi
- Time zone: UTC+5:30 (IST)
- PIN: 402307
- Nearest city: Mandangad

Ambadawe is a village in the Mandangad taluk of Ratnagiri district in Maharashtra, India. This village is where Dr. B. R. Ambedkar got his current known surname, "Ambedkar", from his father's last name, "Sapkal". At that time it was common for village name of children to be written instead of family name in school register. "Ambadawe" was later changed to "Ambedkar" by teacher of Ambedkar at that time.

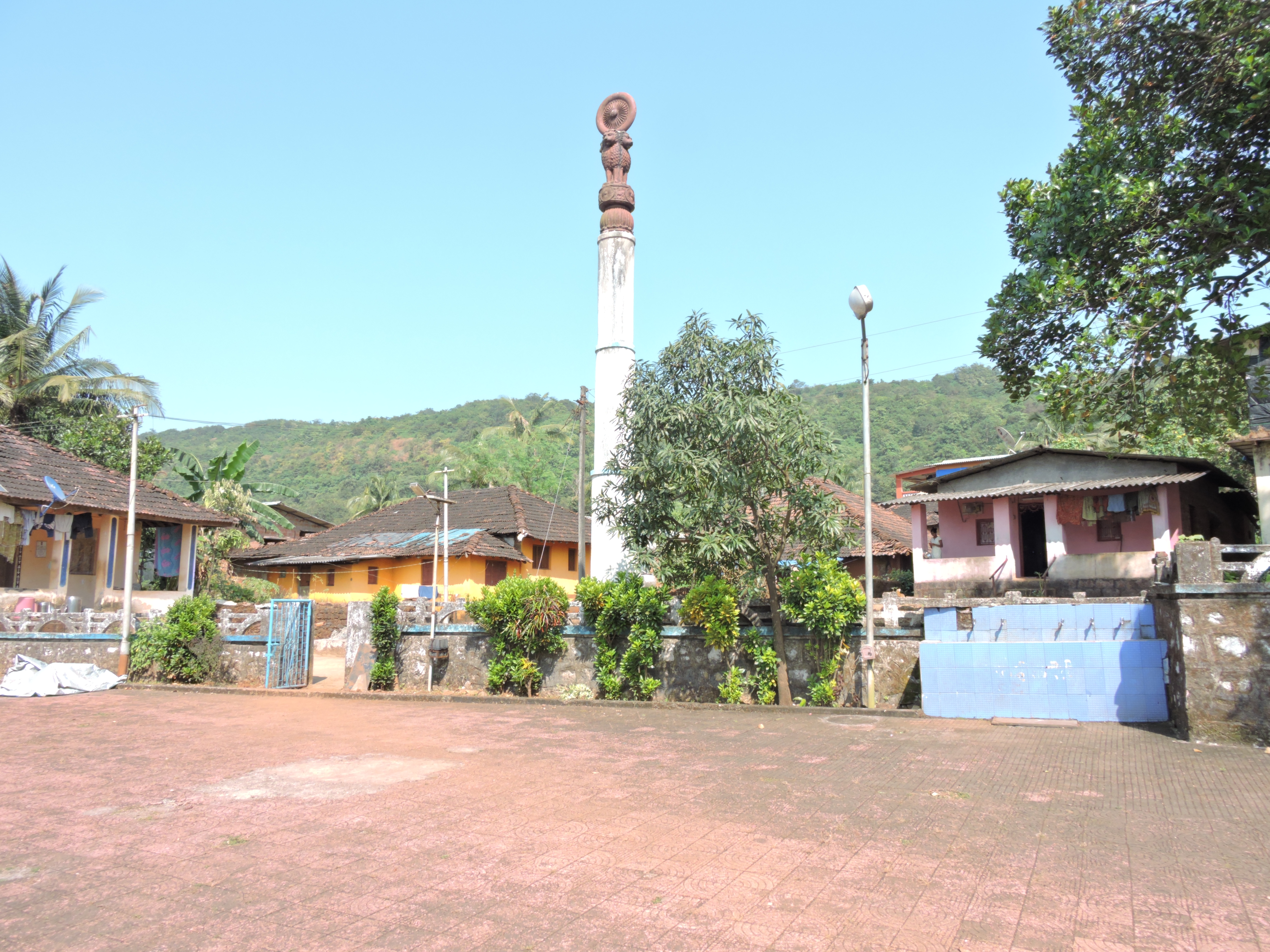
Dr. Babasaheb Ambedkar Memorial Ambadawe

== Census data ==
Particulars	Total	Male	Female
No. of Houses	64	-	-
Population	240	111	129
Child (0–6)	25	16	9
Schedule Caste	57	27	30
Schedule Tribe	11	7	4
Literacy	79.53%	85.26%	75.00%
Total Workers	51	44	7

== Notable people ==
The teacher of B. R. Ambedkar, the Indian jurist, politician, and social reformer from Maharashtra, is from this village. His original surname was Sakpal but his teacher, Krishan Keshav Ambedkar, gave his surname Ambedkar to Bhimrao Sakpal, which later turned into Bhimrao Ambedkar.
