= Olgaon =

Village in Maharashtra

- Village
- Interactive map of Olgaon
- Country: India
- State: Maharashtra

Olgaon is a small village in Ratnagiri district, Maharashtra state in Western India. The 2011 Census of India recorded a total of 408 residents in the village. Olgaon is 414.79 hectares in size.

== History ==
The village is located off Olgaon road in Dapoli taluka. There is a A small river that cuts through the village. The village once relied on Sugarcane production but the costs became too great.

The village has a temple which they have named Bholenath Temple. A legend states that Bholenath appeared to a villager in a dream and told him to build a temple. Alcohol is prohibited in Olgaon.
