= Dumdeo =

Village in Maharashtra

- Village
- Interactive map of Dumdeo
- Country: India
- State: Maharashtra

Dumdeo is a small village in Dapoli tehsil, Ratnagiri district, Maharashtra state in Western India. The 2011 Census of India recorded a total of 164 residents in the village. Dumdeo is 83.26 hectares in size. It is 20 km from Dapoli city and 1.5 km from Dapoli-Dabhol state highway.
