= Tetavali =

Village in Maharashtra

- Village
- Interactive map of Tetavali
- Country: India
- State: Maharashtra

Tetavali is a small village in Dapoli Taluka, Ratnagiri district, Maharashtra state in Western India. The 2011 Census of India recorded a total of 2,008 residents in the village. Tetavali is 761.84 hectares in size.

== See also ==
- Dapoli
