= Awashi Dam =

- Interactive map of Awashi Dam
- Official name: Awashi Dam D03353
- Location: Dapoli
- Coordinates: 17.8776139°N 73.271293°E
- Opening date: 1999
- Owners: Government of Maharashtra, India

Dam and spillways
- Type of dam: Earthfill
- Impounds: local river
- Height: 36.51 m (119.8 ft)
- Length: 350 m (1,150 ft)
- Dam volume: 894 km^{3} (214 cu mi)

Reservoir
- Total capacity: 10,440 km^{3} (2,500 cu mi)
- Surface area: 831 km^{2} (321 sq mi)

Awashi Dam is an earthfill dam on local river near Dapoli, Ratnagiri district, in the state of Maharashtra in India.

== Specifications ==
The height of the dam above its lowest foundation is 36.51 m (119.8 ft) while the length is 350 m (1,150 ft). The volume content is 894 km^{3} (214 cu mi), and the gross storage capacity is 11,151.00 km^{3} (2,675.27 cu mi).

== Purpose ==
- Irrigation

== See also ==
- Dams in Maharashtra
- List of reservoirs and dams in India
