= Dhutroli =

Village in Maharashtra

- Village
- Interactive map of Dhutroli
- Country: India
- State: Maharashtra

Dhutroli is a small village in Mandangad, Ratnagiri district, Maharashtra state in Western India. The 2011 Census of India recorded a total of 1,049 residents in the village. Dhutroli's geographical area is 458 hectares (1,130 acres).
