= Jog River =

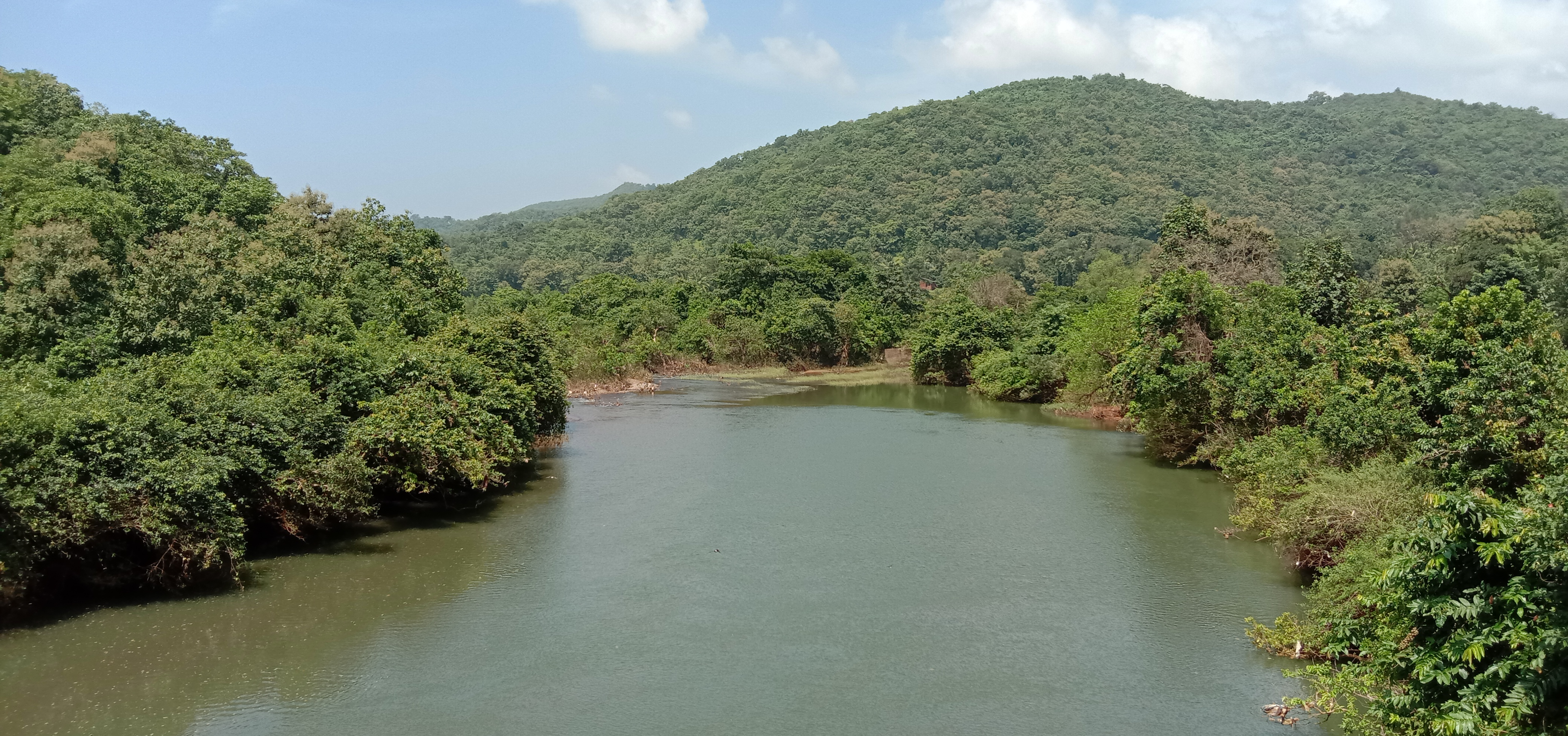
- Jog river near Bandhtivare village
- Native name: जोग नदी (Marathi)

Location
- State: Maharashtra
- District: Ratnagiri

Physical characteristics
- Source
  - coordinates: 17.8225°N 73.2931°E
- Mouth: Arabian Sea
  - coordinates: 17.8419°N 73.0921°E

Basin features
- Bridges: Near Harnai on MSH 4; near village Tadil.

Jog River (Marathi: जोग नदी) is a river in Ratnagiri district of Maharashtra. The river has its origin in the Sahyadri ranges and flows westward near the town Dapoli and meets the Arabian Sea near Anjarle.
