= Gavhe =

Village in Maharashtra

- Village
- Interactive map of Gavhe
- Country: India
- State: Maharashtra

Gavhe is a small village near the town of Dapoli, in Ratnagiri district, Maharashtra state in Western India. The 2011 Census of India recorded a total of 1,417 residents in the village. Gavhe's geographical area is 662 hectares (1,640 acres).
