= Visapur =

Village in Maharashtra

Visapur is a small village near the town of Dapoli, in Ratnagiri district, Maharashtra state in Western India. The 2011 Census of India recorded a total of 670 residents in the village. Visapur's geographical area is 402 hectares (990 acres).
