= Bholavali =

Village in Maharashtra

- Village
- Location in Maharashtra, India Bholavali (India)
- Coordinates: 17°50′N 73°36′E
- Country: India
- State: Maharashtra
- District: ratnagiri
- Post Office: latwan
- Taluka/Tehsil: Mandangad

Government
  - Type: Gram Panchayat
  - Body: Sarpanch
- Elevation: 150.59 m (494.1 ft)

Population (2011)
  - Total: 823+

Languages
  - Official: Marathi
- Time zone: UTC+5:30 (IST)
- PIN: 415202
- Telephone code: 0-2350
- Vehicle registration: MH-08
- Nearest city: Mahad.

Bholavali is a small village in Mandangad, Ratnagiri district, Maharashtra state in Western India. The 2011 Census of India recorded a total of 823 residents in the village. Post Office: Latwan. Nearest Railway station: Karanjadi railway station. Bholavali's geographical area is 623 hectares (1,540 acres).

Places to visit:
1. BHOLAVALI'S dam
2. Devacha Dongar (Mallikarjun Temple)
3. Kalbacha Deul (Temple)
4.Vitthal-Rukmani (Temple)
5.Devacha Mal(O/Waman/Rane)

Cluster(Wadi)
1. Khalcha Kond
2. Katal Wadi
3. Faujdar Kond
4. Bouddha Wadi
5. Rane Wadi(फड)
6. Devul Kond
7. Gaval Waddi
8. Bhend wadi
9. Mane wadi
10.Varcha kond
