= Mandangad fort =

Fort in Maharashtra, India

Mandangad Fort
- Part of Konkan coast
- Ratnagiri district, Maharashtra

Site information
- Type: Hill fort
- Owner: Government of India
- Controlled by: Ahmadnagar (-1661); Maratha Empire (1661-1818); United Kingdom: East India Company (1818-1857); British Raj (1857-1947); India (1947-)
- Open to the public: Yes
- Condition: Ruins

Location
- Location Of Mandangad fort
- Location within Maharashtra Location within India
- Coordinates: 17°58′47.4″N 73°14′37″E
- Height: 625 M(2050.52 Ft)

Site history
- Built by: King Bhoj
- Materials: Laterite Stone

Mandangad Fort (also called Chitradurga Fort) is about 2 km from Mandangad town in Ratnagiri District, Maharashtra. This fort is said to be constructed by King Bhoj. After the Mughals lost the Battle of Umberkhind, This fort was captured by Chhatrapati Shivaji Maharaj in the battle with Adil Shah. A 400-year-old cannon is the major feature of the fort. The fort constitutes a Ganapati Temple and a tank called Thorla Talav.

It consists of three separate fortifications - Mandangad proper to the south, Parkot in the middle while Jamba in the north. The Jamba water reservoir is now dry. Even though they are believed be much older, local legend attributes Mandangad to Shivaji, Parkot to Habshi of the Siddis and Jamba to Kanhoji Angre(also called Angria). All three forts were captured in 1818 by Col. Kennedy.
