= Kolbandre =

Village in Maharashtra

- Village
- Interactive map of Kolbandre
- Country: India
- State: Maharashtra

Kolbandre is a small village in Ratnagiri district, Maharashtra state in Western India. The 2011 Census of India recorded a total of 1,696 residents. The village is 1,365.78 hectares in size.

== See also ==
- Dapoli
