= Mandivali =

Village in Maharashtra

- Village
- Interactive map of Mandivali
- Country: India
- State: Maharashtra

Mandivali is a small village in Ratnagiri district, Maharashtra state in Western India. The 2011 Census of India recorded a total of 1,191 residents in the village. Mandivali's geographical area is 517 hectares (1,280 acres).

== See also ==
- Dapoli
