= Borundi =

Village in Ratnagiri, Maharashtra

Burondi
- village
- Location in Maharashtra, India Burondi (India)
- Coordinates: 17.699510°N 73.140192°E
- Country: India
- State: Maharashtra
- Elevation: 5 m (16 ft)

Population
  - Total: 3,966

Languages
  - Official: Marathi Konkani
- Time zone: UTC+5:30 (IST)
- 415720: 415720

Burondi is a coastal village near to Dapoli in the southern state of Maharashtra in India. It has a small population, mostly working in fishing and the merchant navy.

Dapoli offers a mix of beaches like Ladghar, Karde, and Murud; historical sites such as Suvarnadurg and Kanakdurg forts; and natural attractions like the Unhavare hot springs and the Keshavraj Temple. Popular activities include water sports at Ladghar Beach and watching fish auctions at Harnai Port.

Burondi is a village located in Dapoli tehsil of Ratnagiri district in Maharashtra, India. It is situated 35km away from sub-district headquarter Dapoli Camp (tehsildar office) and 200km away from district headquarter Ratnagiri. As per 2009 stats, Burondi village is also a gram panchayat.
