= Gudaghe =

Village in Maharashtra

- Village
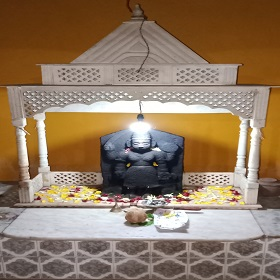
- temple of Satmai Devi

- Location in Maharashtra, India Gudaghe (India)
- Coordinates: 17°35′16.3″N 73°13′58.4″E
- Country: India
- State: Maharashtra
- District: Ratnagiri
- Tehsil: Dapoli
- Established: Somewhere in the year 1500

Government
  - Type: Gram Panchayat

Population
  - Total: Above 687 people

Languages
  - Official: Marathi
  - Other: Marathi, Kokani
- Time zone: UTC+5:30 (IST)
- PIN: 415706
- Nearest town: Dabhol, Dapoli

Gudaghe is a small village in Dapoli Taluka of Ratnagiri District, Maharashtra state in Western India. The 2011 Census of India recorded a total of 687 residents in the village. Gudaghe's geographical area is approximately 406 hectares (1,000 acres).

== Geography ==
Gudaghe is a village which is located about 30.6 km from Dapoli. It has a consistent elevation from the coastal region to the hilly region. As part of the Western Ghats, the forests are evergreen, consisting mainly of tropical forest. Alphonso mangos, cashew Nuts, jack fruit & coconuts are grown commercially in this area. The place is subjected to different kind of weathers all around the year and so the flora and fauna are affected accordingly.

Main Spoken language is Marathi and most of the people belong to a single large family.

Major followed religion is Hinduism.

== Education ==
The village has a very old school named Zilla Parishad Primary Marathi School Gudaghe. Mostly Students travel to Dapoli, Khed, Ratnagiri, Mumbai and Pune for Higher Education.

== Sports ==
Cricket is a very popular game in the village of Gudaghe. In addition, Kho-Kho and Kabaddi are also played in sports especially at school level.
