= Dahagaon =

Village in Maharashtra

Coordinates: 19°37′N 77°40′E

- Village
- Dahagaon
- Interactive map of Dahagaon
- Country: India
- State: Maharashtra
- City: mandangad

Dahagaon is a small village located in Mandangad, Ratnagiri district, Maharashtra state in Western India. It belongs to Konkan region. The 2011 Census of India recorded a total of 1,361 residents in the village. out of which male population is 635 while female population is 726.

This place is in the border of the Ratnagiri District and Raigad District. Raigad District Mahad is North towards this place. It is near to Arabian sea. There is a chance of humidity in the weather.

Dahagaon's geographical area is 593 hectares (1,470 acres).
