= Phansu =

Village in Maharashtra

- Village
- Interactive map of Phansu
- Coordinates: 17°39′04″N 73°17′06″E
- Country: India
- State: Maharashtra

Phansu is a village in the Ratnagiri district of Maharashtra, in the Dapoli taluka. It is a rural town located in the Konkan division. The 2011 Census of India recorded a total of 1,069 residents in the village. Phansu's geographical area is approximately 590 hectares (1,500 acres).

Phansu is named after the jackfruit tree, called "phanas." It is the ancestral land of the Pethes. The Pethes are a Chitpavan family.

Phansu has a school, several stores, and a Hanuman temple.
