= Dhankoli =

Village in Maharashtra

- Village
- Interactive map of Dhankoli
- Coordinates: 17°50′49″N 73°13′07″E
- Country: India
- State: Maharashtra

Dhankoli is a small village in Dapoli taluka, Ratnagiri district, Maharashtra state in Western India. The 2011 Census of India recorded a total of 252 residents in the village. Dhankoli's geographical area is 429 hectares (1,060 acres).
