= Agarvayangani Vanoshi Tarf =

Village in Maharashtra

- Village
- Country: India
- State: Maharashtra

Agarvayangani Vanoshi Tarf is a small village in Ratnagiri district, Maharashtra state in Western India. The 2011 Census of India recorded a total of 1,383 residents in the village. Agarvayangani Vanoshi Tarf's geographical area is approximately 971 hectares (2,400 acres).
