= Adkhal =

Village in Maharashtra

- Village
- Interactive map of Adkhal
- Coordinates: 18.0081°N 73.2380°E
- Country: India
- State: Maharashtra

Adkhal is a small village in the Ratnagiri district, Maharashtra state in Western India. The 2011 Census of India recorded a total of 563 residents in the village. Adkhal's geographical area is 741 hectares (1,830 acres).
