= Tadil =

Village in Ratnagiri district, Maharashtra, Western India

- Village
- Interactive map of Tadil
- Country: India
- State: Maharashtra

Tadil is a small village in Ratnagiri district, Maharashtra state in Western India. The 2011 Census of India recorded a total of 1,269 residents in the village. Tadil's geographical area is 1,099 hectares (2,720 acres).
