= Tadachakond =

Village in Maharashtra

- Village
- Interactive map of Tadachakond
- Country: India
- State: Maharashtra

Tadachakond is a small village in Ratnagiri district, Maharashtra state in Western India. The 2011 Census of India recorded a total of 269 residents in the village. Tadachakond's geographical area is 166 hectares (410 acres).
