= Umbarghar =

Village in Maharashtra

Umbarghar is a small village in Ratnagiri district, Maharashtra state in Western India. The 2011 Census of India recorded a total of 514 residents in the village. Umbarghar's geographical area is approximately 90 hectares (220 acres).
