= Asond =

Village in Maharashtra, India

- Village
- Interactive map of Asond
- Coordinates: 17.6831152°N 73.2729809°E
- Country: India
- State: Maharashtra

Asond is a small village in Ratnagiri district, Maharashtra state in Western India. The 2011 Census of India recorded a total of 1,493 residents in the village. Asond's geographical area is 745 hectares (1,840 acres).
