= Lonvadi =

Village in Maharashtra

- Village
- Interactive map of Lonvadi
- Country: India
- State: Maharashtra

Lonvadi is a small village in Ratnagiri district, Maharashtra state in Western India. The 2011 Census of India recorded a total of 242 residents in the village. Lonvadi's geographical area is 154 hectares (380 acres).
