= Kharavate =

Village in Maharashtra

- Village
- Interactive map of Kharavate
- Country: India
- State: Maharashtra

Kharavate is a small village in Ratnagiri district, Maharashtra state in Western India. The 2011 Census of India recorded a total of 254 residents in the village. Kharavate's geographical area is 372 hectares (920 acres).
