= Tamastirth =

Village in Maharashtra

- Village
- Interactive map of Tamastirth
- Country: India
- State: Maharashtra

Tamastirth is a small village in Ratnagiri district, Maharashtra state in Western India. The 2011 Census of India recorded a total of 641 residents in the village. Tamastirth's geographical area is 214 hectares (530 acres).
