= Pharare =

Village in Maharashtra

Pharare farare
- Village
- Interactive map of Pharare
- Country: India
- State: Maharashtra

Pharare is a small village in Ratnagiri district, Maharashtra state in Western India. The 2011 Census of India recorded a total of 1,106 residents in the village. Pharare's geographical area is approximately 528 hectares (1,300 acres).
