= Navashi =

Village in Maharashtra

- Village
- Interactive map of Navashi
- Country: India
- State: Maharashtra

Navashi is a small village in Ratnagiri district, Maharashtra state in Western India. The 2011 Census of India recorded a total of 871 residents in the village.Chandiwade,Shigwan, Gurav, Bhuwad are some surnames of residents . Navashi's geographical area is approximately 449 hectares (1,110 acres).
