= Sakurde =

Village in Maharashtra

- Village
- Interactive map of Sakurde
- Country: India
- State: Maharashtra

Sakurde is a small village in Ratnagiri district, Maharashtra state in Western India. The 2011 Census of India recorded a total of 937 residents in the village. Sakurde's geographical area is 1,099 hectares (2,720 acres).
