= Wakavali =

Village in Maharashtra

Wakavali is a small village in Ratnagiri district, Maharashtra state in Western India. The 2011 Census of India recorded a total of 2,001 residents in the village. Wakavali is 431.51 hectares in size.
