= Kherdi =

- Census town
- Location in Maharashtra, India
- Coordinates: 17.52°N 73.548°E
- Country: India
- State: Maharashtra
- District: Ratnagiri

Population (2001)
  - Total: 10,703

Languages
  - Official: Marathi
- Time zone: UTC+5:30 (IST)

Kherdi is a census town in Ratnagiri in the Indian state of Maharashtra. It has Maharashtra Industrial Development Corporation (MIDC).

== Demographics ==
As of 2001 India census, Kherdi had a population of 10,703. Males constitute 53% of the population and females 47%. Kherdi has an average literacy rate of 75%, higher than the national average of 59.5%: male literacy is 79%, and female literacy is 70%. In Kherdi, 15% of the population is under 6 years of age.
