= Damame =

Village in Maharashtra

- Village
- Interactive map of Damame
- Country: India
- State: Maharashtra

Damame is a small village in Ratnagiri district, Maharashtra state in Western India. The 2011 Census of India recorded a total of 629 residents in the village. Damame's geographical area is approximately 530 hectares (1,300 acres).
