= Pophalwane =

Village in Maharashtra

- Village
- Interactive map of Pophalwane
- Country: India
- State: Maharashtra

Pophalwane is a small village in Ratnagiri district, Maharashtra state in Western India. The 2011 Census of India recorded a total of 1,272 residents in the village. Pophalwane is 800.84 hectares in size.
