= Onanvase =

Village in Maharashtra

- Village
- Interactive map of Onanvase
- Coordinates: 17°36′06″N 73°13′33″E
- Country: India
- State: Maharashtra

Onanvase is a small village in Ratnagiri district, Maharashtra state in Western India. The 2011 Census of India recorded a total of 858 residents in the village. Onanvase's geographical area is approximately 490 hectares (1,200 acres).
