= Pichadoli =

Village in Maharashtra

- Village
- Interactive map of Pichadoli
- Country: India
- State: Maharashtra

Pichadoli is a small village in Ratnagiri district, Maharashtra state in Western India. The 2011 Census of India recorded a total of 295 residents in the village. Pichadoli's geographical area is 783 hectares (1,930 acres).
