= Mauje Dapoli =

Village in Maharashtra

- Village
- Interactive map of Mauje Dapoli
- Country: India
- State: Maharashtra

Mauje Dapoli is a small village in Ratnagiri district, Maharashtra state in Western India. The 2011 Census of India recorded a total of 1,275 residents in the village. Mauje Dapoli's geographical area is 383 hectares (950 acres).
