= Shirkhal =

Village in Maharashtra

Shirkhal (शिरखल) is a big village in Ratnagiri district, Maharashtra state in Western India. The 2011 Census of India recorded a total of 1,086 residents in the village. Shirkhal is 825.68 hectares in size.

Shirkhal is big village in dapoli taluka. this village divided in to total nine wadis 1) Gaonwadi 2)Bhivjichi Wadi 3)Boudha Wadi 4)Sutar Wadi 5)Vadbhavun Wadi 6) Aadiwashi Wadi 8)Daghdhawne 9) Wolvan Wadi

Shirkhal located in centre of three talukas (Dapoli Khed and Mandangad). Shirkhal family is the word no 1 (head) of this village, Manai Devi (मानाई देवी) Mandir is the biggest temple in Shirkhal.

Geography - Shirkhal is situated in the Ratnagiri - Dapoli of India Maharashtra, at an elevation of 27 meters above sea level. The village is surrounded by natural features such as rivers, mountains, forests, hidden waterfalls etc.

17.8384° N, 73.3443° E

Distance from Mumbai :207km

Std code : 02358

Pincode - 415716
