= Murdi, Maharashtra =

Village in Maharashtra

Murdi
- Village
- Interactive map of Murdi
- Country: India
- State: Maharashtra

Murdi (India)

Murdi is a small village in Ratnagiri district, Maharashtra state in Western India. The 2011 Census of India recorded a total of 635 residents in the village. Murdi's geographical area is 414 hectares (1,020 acres).
