= Teleshwarnagar =

Village in Maharashtra

- Village
- Interactive map of Teleshwarnagar
- Country: India
- State: Maharashtra

Teleshwarnagar is a small village in Ratnagiri district, Maharashtra state in Western India. The 2011 Census of India recorded a total of 453 residents in the village. Teleshwarnagar is 226.61 hectares in size.
