= Shiravane =

Village in Maharashtra

- Village
- Country: India
- State: Maharashtra

Shiravane is a small village in Raigad district, Shrivardhan taluka, Maharashtra state in Western India. The 2011 Census of India recorded a total of 662 residents in the village. Shiravane's geographical area is 379 hectares (940 acres).
