= Shital Nagar =

Village in Maharashtra

- Village
- Interactive map of Shital Nagar
- Country: India
- State: Maharashtra

Shital Nagar is a small village in Ratnagiri district, Maharashtra state in Western India. The 2011 Census of India recorded a total of 354 residents in the village. Shital Nagar's geographical area is 407 hectares (1,010 acres).
