= Velvi =

Village in Maharashtra

Velvi is a small village in Ratnagiri district, Maharashtra state in Western India. The 2011 Census of India recorded a total of 342 residents in the village. Velvi's geographical area is 340 hectares (840 acres).
