= Shivajinagar, Ratnagiri =

Village in Maharashtra

Shivajinagar
- Village
- Interactive map of Shivajinagar
- Country: India
- State: Maharashtra

Shivajinagar is a small village in Ratnagiri district, Maharashtra state in Western India. The 2011 Census of India recorded a total of 1,089 residents in the village. Shivajinagar is 454.37 hectares in size.
