= Malvi, Maharashtra =

Village in Maharashtra

Coordinates: 15°47′N 74°22′E

Malvi
- Village
- Interactive map of Malvi
- Country: India
- State: Maharashtra

Population
  - Total: 226

Malvi is a small village in Ratnagiri district, Maharashtra state in Western India. The 2011 Census of India recorded a total of 226 residents in the village. Malvi's geographical area is 416 hectares (1,030 acres).
