= Ladghar =

Village in Maharashtra

- Village
- Interactive map of Ladghar
- Country: India
- State: Maharashtra

Ladghar is a small village in Ratnagiri district, Maharashtra state in Western India. The 2011 Census of India recorded a total of 1,398 residents in the village. Ladghar's geographical area is 558 hectares (1,380 acres).
