= Asud, Maharashtra =

Village in Maharashtra, India

Asud
- Village
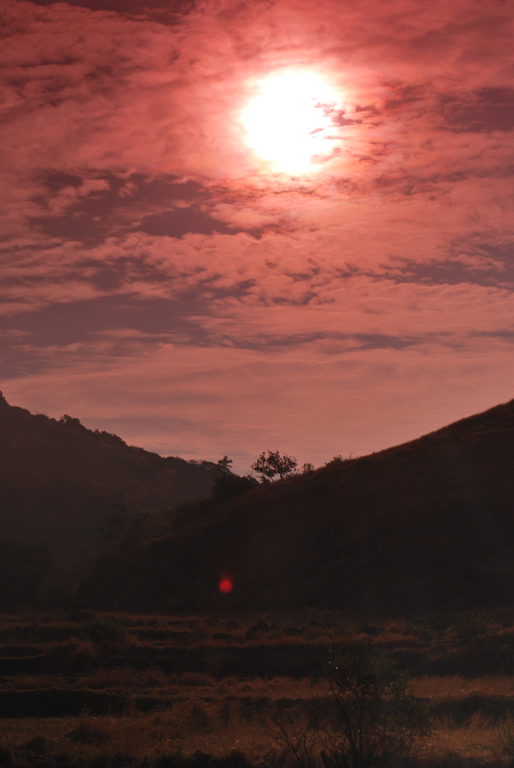
- Interactive map of Asud
- Coordinates: 17.7838348°N 73.1253591°E
- Country: India
- State: Maharashtra

Asud is a small village in Ratnagiri district, Maharashtra state in Western India. The 2011 Census of India recorded a total of 2,450 residents in the village. Asud is 859.98 hectares in size.
