= Talsure =

Village in Maharashtra

- Village
- Interactive map of Talsure
- Country: India
- State: Maharashtra

Talsure is a small village in Ratnagiri district, Maharashtra state in Western India. The 2011 Census of India recorded a total of 1,426 residents in the village. Talsure is 927.11 hectares in size.
