= Borthal =

Village in Maharashtra

- Village
- Interactive map of Borthal
- Coordinates: 17.8724552°N 73.1023602°E
- Country: India
- State: Maharashtra
- District: Ratnagiri

Borthal is a small village in Ratnagiri district, Maharashtra state in Western India. The 2011 Census of India recorded a total of 342 residents in the village. Borthal's geographical area is 174 hectares (430 acres).
