= Gavrai =

Village in Maharashtra

- Village
- Interactive map of Gavrai
- Country: India
- State: Maharashtra

Gavrai is a small village in Ratnagiri District, Maharashtra state in Western India. The 2011 Census of India recorded a total of 442 residents in the village. Gavrai's geographical area is approximately 293 hectares (720 acres).
