= Katran, Maharashtra =

Village in Maharashtra

Coordinates: 25°07′N 82°36′E

Katran
- Village
- Interactive map of Katran
- Country: India
- State: Maharashtra

Katran is a small village in Ratnagiri district, Maharashtra state in Western India. The 2011 Census of India recorded a total of 923 residents in the village. Katran's geographical area is approximately 472 hectares (1,170 acres).
