= Waghave =

Village in Maharashtra

Waghave is a small village in Ratnagiri district, Maharashtra state in Western India. The 2011 Census of India recorded a total of 307 residents in the village. Waghave's geographical area is 345 hectares (850 acres).
