= Bhanghar =

Village in Maharashtra

- Village
- Interactive map of Bhanghar
- Country: India
- State: Maharashtra

Bhanghar is a small village in Ratnagiri district, Maharashtra state in Western India. The 2011 census of India recorded a total of 270 residents in the village. Bhanghar's geographical area is 428 hectares (1,060 acres).
