= Pavnal =

Village in Maharashtra

- Village
- Interactive map of Pavnal
- Country: India
- State: Maharashtra

Pavnal is a small village in Ratnagiri district, Maharashtra state in Western India. The 2011 Census of India recorded a total of 521 residents in the village. Pavnal's geographical area is approximately 428 hectares (1,060 acres).
