= Mathegujar =

Village in Maharashtra

- Village
- Interactive map of Mathegujar
- Country: India
- State: Maharashtra

Mathegujar is a small village in Ratnagiri district, Maharashtra state in Western India. The 2011 Census of India recorded a total of 363 residents in the village. Mathegujar's geographical area is approximately 327 hectares (810 acres).
