= Kolthare =

Village in Maharashtra

- Village
- Interactive map of Kolthare
- Country: India
- State: Maharashtra

Kolthare is a village in the Ratnagiri district, in the Indian state of Maharashtra. The village has a total geographic area of 373.58 hectares in size.

Kolthare is known for its beach on the Arabian Sea.

== Demographics ==
The 2011 Census of India recorded a total of 1,007 residents in the village. Inhabitants of Kolthare speak the Indo-Aryan languages of Konkani, specifically the Daldi dialect, and Marathi.

== Geography ==
Kolthare is a village in Dapoli Taluka in the Ratnagiri District, belonging to the Konkan Division. It is located 86 km to the North of District headquarters Ratnagiri, 19 km from Dapoli and 182 km from State capital Mumbai.

The total geographical area of Kolthare village is 3.7358 square kilometers and is the 61st smallest village by area in the sub-district. The village's population is 269.

The nearest town to the village is Dapoli Camp and the distance from Kolthare village to Dapoli Camp is 32 km. Burundi (5 km), Vanoshi T. Panchanadi (5 km), Dabhol (8 km), Veldur (9 km), Dhopawe (10 km) are also some of the closest villages. Kolthare is surrounded by Guhagar Taluka towards the south, Khed Taluka towards the east, Mandangad Taluka towards the north, and Chipalun Taluka towards the east.

Chiplun, Mahad, Mahabaleswar, and Ratnagiri are the nearest cities to Kolthare, while also located close to the Sea.

== Politics ==
BJP, NCP, INC, SHS are the major political parties in this area.

== Religion ==
- Shri Dev Koleshwar, an ancient Shiva temple.

== Transport ==
=== Rail ===
The Khed Railway Station (near Khed) is the closest (about 40 km) railway station. The nearest major station, the Ratnagiri Railway Station, is about 83 km away.

=== Road ===
Dapoli is the only nearby town to have road connectivity to Kolthare.
