= Degaon, Maharashtra =

Village in Maharashtra

Degaon
- Village
- Interactive map of Degaon
- Coordinates: 17°38′28″N 73°17′51″E
- Country: India
- State: Maharashtra

Degaon is a small village in Ratnagiri district, Maharashtra state in Western India. The 2011 Census of India recorded a total of 825 residents in the village. Degaon's geographical area is approximately 758 hectares (1,870 acres).
