= Kumbhave =

Village in Maharashtra

- Village
- Interactive map of Kumbhave
- Country: India
- State: Maharashtra

Kumbhave ( कुंभवे) is a small village in Ratnagiri district, Maharashtra state in Western India. The 2011 Census of India recorded a total of 1,207 residents in the village. Kumbhave's geographical area is approximately 460 hectares (1,100 acres).
