= Panchanadi =

Village in Maharashtra

- Village
- Interactive map of Panchanadi
- Country: India
- State: Maharashtra

Panchanadi is a small village in Ratnagiri district, Maharashtra state in Western India. The 2011 Census of India recorded a total of 1,684 residents in the village. Panchanadi is 1,202 hectares in size. The meaning of Panchanadi in Sanskrit literally translates to Five Rivers.

Presently the village has been connected to the Kothari River due to the construction of a long bridge near the Arabian Sea.
