= Anjarle =

Village in Maharashtra

- village
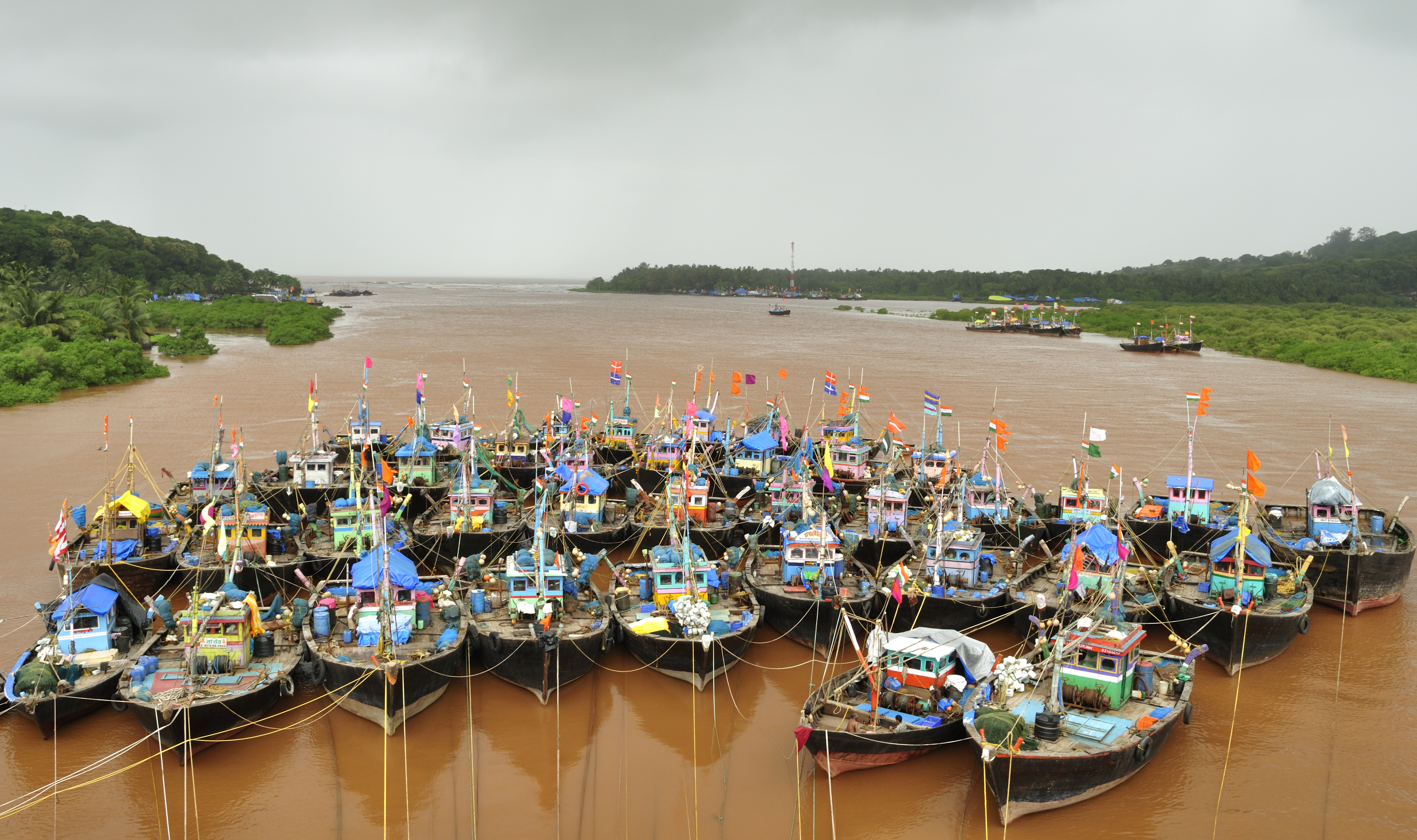
- Fishing boats moored in the Anjarle creek

- Location in Maharashtra, India Anjarle (India)
- Coordinates: 17.85°N 73.09°E
- Country: India
- State: Maharashtra
- District: Ratnagiri
- Talukas: Dapoli
- Elevation: 36 m (118 ft)

Population (2010)
  - Total: 1,654

Languages
  - Official: Marathi
- Time zone: UTC+5:30 (IST)
- PIN: 415714

Anjarle is a village in Dapoli taluka, Ratnagiri district, Maharashtra India. It is a small port located near the mouth of Jog river, about 4 mi (6.4 km) south of Aade and 2 mi (3.2 km) north of Suvarnadurga. The nearest railway station is Khed, 31 mi (50 km) to the southeast.

Apart from the nearby Ganapati temple which is known as Kadyavarcha Ganpati, Anjarle is known for its unspoiled beach. Tourism facilities are limited.

== History ==
The origins of Anjarle are connected with the settlement of the Brahmins and the Muslim at Anjarle, and at two other nearby villages, which no longer exist. The Kadyavarcha Ganapati temple was established in the 11th or 12th century.

== Geography ==
Anjarle is located about 24 km (15 mi) from Dapoli. It has an average elevation of 10 metres (36 feet). As part of the Western Ghats, the forests are evergreen, consisting mainly of tropical forest. Alphonso mangoes and coconuts are grown commercially in this area.

== Transport ==
Anjarle is connected to Dapoli, the closest town, by MSRTC buses, private taxis and autorickshaws.

Anjarle is situated around 18 km (11 mi) from Dapoli. State Transport buses run at an interval of 30–60 minutes. Buses start from Dapoli ST depot and drop passengers at Anjarle creek. In addition, private transport jeeps and rickshaws run between Dapoli and Anjarle.

Anjarle is connected to the nearest road by a bridge on a creek nearby, which is known as the Anjarle creek. One can also ferry across the creek and carry own's car in it, which was basically the only route in days before the bridge was built.

== Kadyawarcha Ganpati ==
Anjarle is known for the Kadyawarcha Ganpati temple (Marathi: Ganapati on a cliff). This temple was originally constructed using wooden pillars ca. 1150. It was renovated between 1768 and 1780. Until the recent construction of bridge across the Anjarle creek and the building of a road up to the temple, pilgrims had to cross Anjarle creek (Jog River) in a boat, before climbing the hill using steps which pass through Anjarle village.

The idol at this temple differs from most other representations of the elephant-headed god, in that its trunk curves right, rather than the usual left. This is known as a Ujwya Sondecha Ganpati (Marathi: right-trunked Ganpati). The idol is also said to be a jagrut daiwat (Marathi: live deity), who responds to the pleas of its supplicants (nawsala pavnara Ganpati). The temple has a stone staircase on the right to reach the top of the temple (the Kalas), which has a commanding view of the surrounding coconut and betel nut trees, the nearby Suvarnadurg Fort, the Arabian Sea and surrounding hills. There is a pond in front of the temple where visitors can feed large fish and turtles. Beside the temple to Ganesh is a small temple to Shiva.

There are many rumors about the origins of this temple, but unfortunately there is no evidence to shed a light on it. Many fables claim the temple's creation traces back to the 12th century, and the old structure of the temple was made completely out of wood. The temple's administration has been with the ‘Nitsure’ family from the year 1630. As per the fables, this temple was at the seashore in the ancient days. The same seashore was home to two other temples of Ajayrayleshwar and Siddhivinayak.

== Products ==
Ajarle is known for producing Alphanso mangoes and cashew nuts, which are available from April through May. Other products include watermelons, pickles, jackfruit chips and kokam sarbat from various places throughout the year.

== Industries ==
The economy of the Anjarle village revolves around agriculture, travel and tourism, food processing (canning of mango pulp).

== Festivals ==
From February to May, Anjarle hosts a festival called the Turtle Festival, where young hatchlings of olive ridley sea turtles are released back into the ocean. During January and February (during the Hindu month of Magh) a festival of Ganapati is celebrated at Kadyavaril Ganapati temple. In March, Anjarle holds a Holi festival at which the game Kat-khel is played. Jatra is held at Durga temple in April and May. Ganpati is held in September. Ram Navami is also celebrated on a large scale at Harnai Paj, which is 3 km away from Anjarle.
