= Umbarle =

Village in Maharashtra

Umbarle is a small village in Ratnagiri district, Maharashtra state in Western India. The 2011 Census of India recorded a total of 860 residents in the village. Umbarle is 517 hectares in size.
