= Mugij =

Village in Maharashtra

Mugij Mungiz
- Village
- Location in Maharashtra, India Mugij (India)
- Coordinates: 17°53′48″N 73°18′23″E
- Country: India
- State: Maharashtra
- Division: Konkan
- District: Ratnagiri
- Taluka: Dapoli

Government
  - MLA: Mr Yogesh Kadam

Area
  - Total: 2.56 km^{2} (0.99 sq mi)

Population (2011)
  - Total: 570
  - Density: 220/km^{2} (580/sq mi)

Languages
  - Official: Konkani, Marathi, Urdu, Hindi, English
- Time zone: UTCIST (UTC+5:30) (IST)
- PIN: 415716
- Telephone code: 02358
- Vehicle registration: MHO8
- Literacy: 88.29%
- Climate: humid (Köppen)

Mugij is a small village in Ratnagiri district, Maharashtra state in Western India. The 2011 Census of India recorded a total of 570 residents in the village. In Mugij there are three primary schools one is Urdu medium and another are Marathi medium. In Mugij there are many religions people are living like Hindu Muslim and Buddha. Mugij's geographical area is 256 hectares (630 acres).

Dapoli taluka start with first village Mugij if you go via Mandangad to Dapoli. It is well situated in mountains from 3 sides. Shri Salubai is "Gramdaivat"(lord of village).

Mugij Pin code is 415716 and postal head office is Palgad.

== Location ==
Mugij is on State Highway SH272 between Mandangad and Dapoli. [3] The nearest Railway Station is Khed which is 30 km away. 26 km. from Dapoli. Mugij is situated beside the banks of a seasonal stream called locally as Dongar and is surrounded on all sides by low hills. It rains in plenty during Monsoon season. The temperature in Mugij varies between 20 and 35 degrees. Ratnagiri District can be physically divided into 3 zones viz. Coastal, Middle and Hilly. Mugij falls under Middle Zone. Middle zone is characterized by a medium altitude. It is more accessible due to the Bombay–Goa Highway as well as the Konkan railway..

Vinhere Rail Way Station is the very nearby railway station to Mugij. Khed Rail Way Station (near Khed) is the rail way station reachable from a nearby town. Gharadi (3 km), Shirsoli (4 km), Tangar (5 km), Shirsadi (5 km), and Dabhat (5 km) are the nearby villages to Mugij. Mugij is surrounded by Dapoli Taluka towards the, Poladpur Taluka towards the, Mahad Taluka towards the north, and Khed Taluka towards the .

== Political administration ==
Mugij comes under the Konkan Division of Maharashtra State. It falls under the Raigad Lok Sabha Constituency and Dapoli Vidhan Sabha Constituency. Current MLA and MP representing Mugij are below

| Year | Government Body | Position | Constituency | Party | Member |
|---|---|---|---|---|---|
| 2019 | Maharashtra Legislative Assembly | MLA | Dapoli | SS | Mr Yogesh Kadam |

== Transportation ==
Mugij enjoys good road connectivity to nearby major towns, with the State Highway 272 (Mandangad–Dapoli) passing through the village and providing access to important locations. Regular bus services operate as per their schedules, and auto-rickshaws are generally available for local transportation.

However, a serious concern exists in Iqbal Nagar, Mugij. The internal roads in this area have not been repaired for the past 4–5 years or even longer, and their condition has deteriorated badly. The roads are so damaged that walking properly has become difficult, especially for children, elderly residents, and patients. During monsoons, the situation worsens further, causing inconvenience, safety risks, and daily hardship for the residents.

This long-pending issue highlights the urgent need for immediate road repair and maintenance in Iqbal Nagar, so that residents can enjoy the same level of accessibility, safety, and dignity that proper infrastructure provides.

== Educational facilities ==
S. I. Zilla Parishad Primary Urdu School (IQBAL NAGAR) And Zilla pardishad Marathi School.

Literacy in Mugij(Mungiz) (Ratnagiri Census Handbook, 2011)
1. Literate Male (33.0%)
2. Literate Female (33.3%)
3. Illiterate Male (12.8%)
4. Illiterate Female (20.9%)

== Economy ==
Mugij's economy was hugely dependent on agricultural products until early 1980. Post-1980, most of the young earners head toward metro cities, and thereby agricultural production gets a big hit in the coming years. During the same period, most of the people started to migrate to the Gulf, UK, Canada, Australia, and USA for jobs. Presently, 50% of the Mugij economy depends on remittances from foreign countries and metro cities.

== Healthcare facilities ==
Mugij has a government run primary health center situated at Iqbal Nagar. Apart from this, Mugij has three different small clinics run by resident doctors, Dr. Gaibee, Dr. Girase, and Dr.More .
