= Bhadavale =

Village in Maharashtra

- Village
- Interactive map of Bhadavale
- Country: India
- State: Maharashtra

Bhadavale is a small village in Ratnagiri district, Maharashtra state in Western India. The 2011 Census of India recorded a total of 789 residents in the village. Bhadavale's geographical area is approximately 666 hectares (1,650 acres).
