= Borghar =

Village in Maharashtra

- Village
- Country: India
- State: Maharashtra

Borghar is a small village in Ratnagiri district, Maharashtra state in Western India. The 2011 Census of India recorded a total of 927 residents in the village. Borghar's geographical area is approximately 401 hectares (990 acres).
