= Kudavale =

Village in Maharashtra

- Village
- Interactive map of Kudavale
- Country: India
- State: Maharashtra

Kudavale is a small village in Ratnagiri district, Maharashtra state in Western India. The 2011 Census of India recorded a total of 1,503 residents in the village. Kudavale's geographical area is 1,565 hectares (3,870 acres).
