= Dehen =

Village in Maharashtra

- Village
- Interactive map of Dehen
- Country: India
- State: Maharashtra

Dehen is a small village in Ratnagiri district, Maharashtra state in Western India. The 2011 Census of India recorded a total of 501 residents in the village. Dehen's geographical area is 487 hectares (1,200 acres).
