= Rawtoli =

Village in Maharashtra

- Village
- Interactive map of Rawtoli
- Country: India
- State: Maharashtra

Rawtoli is a small village in Ratnagiri district, Maharashtra state in Western India. The 2011 Census of India recorded a total of 306 residents in the village. Rawtoli's geographical area is 227 hectares (560 acres).
