= Rowale =

Village in Maharashtra

- Village
- Interactive map of Rowale
- Coordinates: 17°54′39″N 73°05′33″E
- Country: India
- State: Maharashtra

Rowale is a small village in Ratnagiri district, Maharashtra state in Western India. The 2011 Census of India recorded a total of 453 residents in the village. Rowale's geographical area is 480 hectares (1,200 acres).
