= Kelashi =

Village in Maharashtra

Kelshi
- Village
- Country: India
- State: Maharashtra

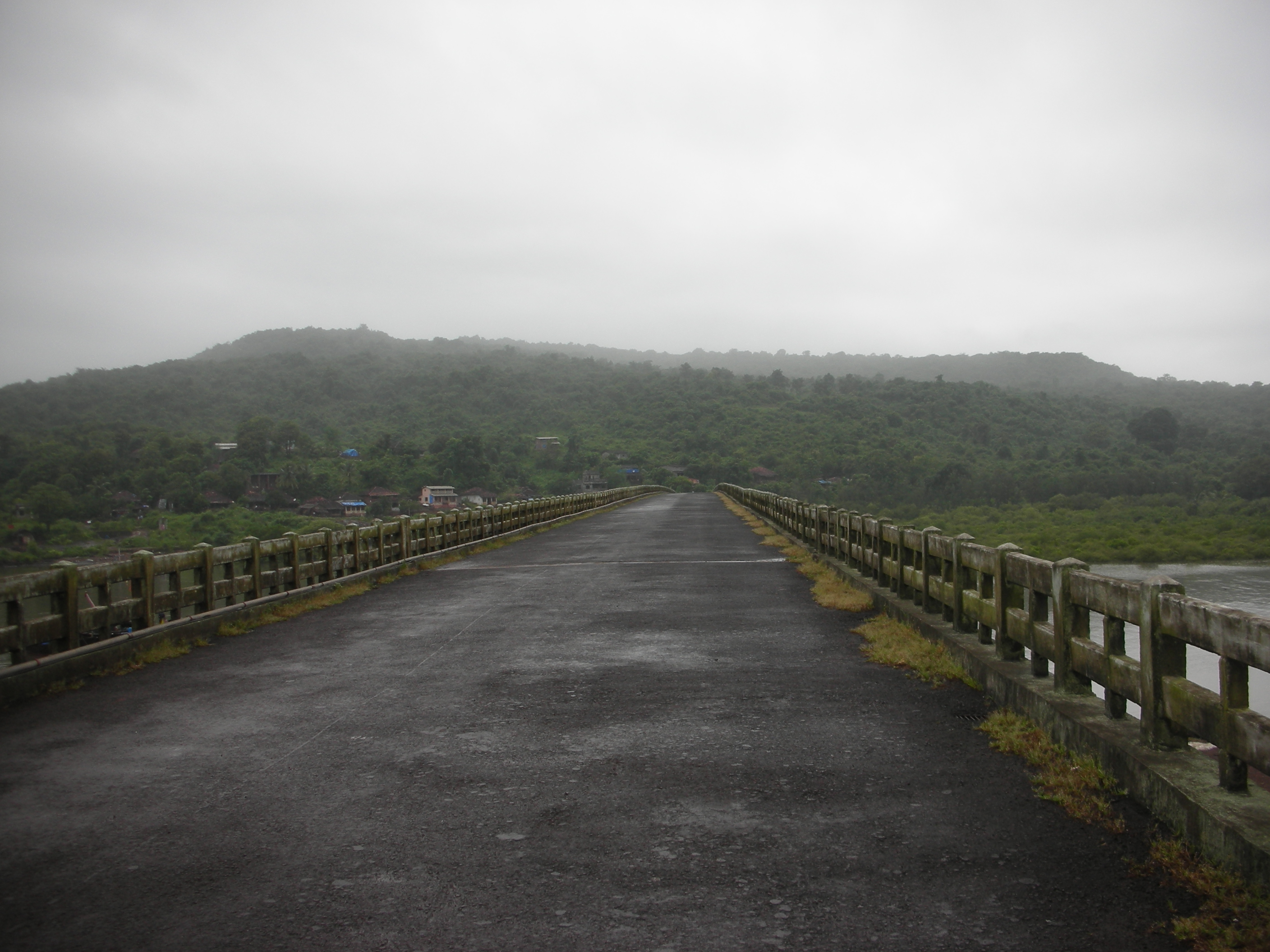
Bridge near the Kelshi Village.

Kelshi is a village in Dapoli taluka, Ratnagiri district, Maharashtra state in Western India. The 2011 Census of India recorded a total of 3,145 residents in the village. Kelshi's geographical area is 265 hectares (650 acres).

Kelshi is a small seaside village, famous for its Mahalaxmi Temple and Yakub baba's dargah.

Mahalaxmi Temple

The temple was built in 1808 during Peshwa regime but the temple complex is far older. Shivaji and Sambhaji used to visit the temple.

Sand Dunes

The village is protected from Bharja river by sand dunes said to be formed due to a tsunami in 16th century.
