= Sukondi =

Village in Maharashtra

- Village
- Interactive map of Sukondi
- Country: India
- State: Maharashtra

Sukondi is a small village in Ratnagiri district, Maharashtra state in Western India. The 2011 Census of India recorded a total of 533 residents in the village. Sukondi's geographical area is 790 hectares (2,000 acres).
