= Devke =

Village in Maharashtra

- Village
- Country: India
- State: Maharashtra

Devke is a small village in Ratnagiri district, Maharashtra state in Western India. The 2011 Census of India recorded a total of 361 residents in the village. Devake's geographical area is 415 hectares (1,030 acres).
