= Unhavare =

Village in Maharashtra

Unhavare is a small village in Dappoli Taluka of Ratnagiri District. [Maharashtra] state in Western India. The 2011 Census of India recorded a total of 138 residents in the village. Unhavare's geographical area is 315 hectares (780 acres). Approach road to this village is from Vakavli, on Dapoli to Khed Road. There are natural hot water springs at this village.
