= Kangavai, Maharashtra =

Village in Maharashtra

Kangavai
- Village
- Interactive map of Kangavai
- Country: India
- State: Maharashtra

Kangavai is a small village in Ratnagiri district, Maharashtra state in Western India. The 2011 Census of India recorded a total of 857 residents in the village. Kangavai's geographical area is 1,252 hectares (3,090 acres).
