= Pisai =

Village in Maharashtra

- Village
- Interactive map of Pisai
- Country: India
- State: Maharashtra

Pisai is a small village in Ratnagiri district, Maharashtra state in Western India. The 2011 Census of India recorded a total of 1,125 residents in the village. Pisai is 836 hectares in size.
