= Kondhye =

Village in Maharashtra

- Village
- Interactive map of Kondhye
- Country: India
- State: Maharashtra

Kondhye is a bik village in Ratnagiri district, Maharashtra state in Western India. The 2011 Census of India recorded a total of 1,442 residents in the village. Kondhye's geographical area is approximately 772 hectares (1,910 acres).
