= Karanjali =

Village in Maharashtra

- Village
- Interactive map of Karanjali
- Country: India
- State: Maharashtra

Karanjali is a small village in Ratnagiri district, Maharashtra state in Western India. The 2011 Census of India recorded a total of 790 residents in the village. Karanjali's geographical area is approximately 629 hectares (1,550 acres).
