= Shirshinge =

Village in Maharashtra

- Village
- Interactive map of Shirshinge
- Country: India
- State: Maharashtra

Shirshinge is a small village in Sindhudurg district, Maharashtra state in Western India. The 2011 Census of India recorded a total of 453 residents in the village. Shirshinge's geographical area is 364 hectares (900 acres).
