= Satere Tarf Natu =

Village in Maharashtra

- Village
- Interactive map of Satere Tarf Natu
- Country: India
- State: Maharashtra

Satere Tarf Natu is a small village in Ratnagiri district, Maharashtra state in Western India. The 2011 Census of India recorded a total of 543 residents in the village. Satere Tarf Natu is 337.56 hectares in size.
