= Juikar Mohalla =

Village in Maharashtra

- Village
- Interactive map of Juikar Mohalla
- Country: India
- State: Maharashtra

Juikar Mohalla is a small village in Ratnagiri district, Maharashtra state in Western India. The 2011 Census of India recorded a total of 1,447 residents in the village. Juikar Mohalla's geographical area is 178 hectares (440 acres).
