= Sadavali, Ratnagiri =

Village in Maharashtra

Sadavali
- Village
- Interactive map of Sadavali
- Country: India
- State: Maharashtra

Sadavali is a small village in Ratnagiri district, Maharashtra state in Western India. The 2011 Census of India recorded a total of 119 residents in the village. Sadavali is 336 hectares in size.
