= Chandivane =

Village in Maharashtra, India

- Village
- Interactive map of Chandivane
- Country: India
- State: Maharashtra

Chandivane is a small village in Ratnagiri district, Maharashtra state in Western India. The 2011 Census of India recorded a total of 148 residents in the village. Chandivane's geographical area is 243 hectares (600 acres).
