= Utambar =

Village in Maharashtra

Coordinates: 26°27′N 72°42′E

Utambar is a small village in Jodhpur District state in Rajasthan, India.
