= Panderi =

Village in Maharashtra

Coordinates: 25°28′N 81°25′E

- Village
- Interactive map of Panderi
- Country: India
- State: Maharashtra

Also Panderi village is Raighad District near Birwadi. Both Panderi are roughly equi distance from MAHAD but in almost opposite directions.

Panderi is a small village in Ratnagiri district, Maharashtra state in Western India. The 2011 Census of India recorded a total of 1,368 residents in the village. Panderi's geographical area is 608 hectares (1,500 acres).
