= Tangar =

Village in Maharashtra

- Village
- Country: India
- State: Maharashtra

Tangar is a small village in Ratnagiri district, Maharashtra state in Western India. The 2011 Census of India recorded a total of 738 residents in the village. Tangar's geographical area is 384 hectares (950 acres).
