= Urphi =

Village in Maharashtra

Urphi is a small village in Ratnagiri district, Maharashtra state in Western India. The 2011 Census of India recorded a total of 474 residents in the village. Urphi's geographical area is approximately 341 hectares (840 acres).
