= Virsai =

Village in Maharashtra

Virsai is a small village in Ratnagiri district, Maharashtra state in Western India. The 2011 Census of India recorded a total of 680 residents in the village. Virsai's geographical area is 612 hectares (1,510 acres).
