= Padale =

Village in Maharashtra

- Village
- Interactive map of Padale
- Country: India
- State: Maharashtra

Padle is a small village in Ratnagiri district, Maharashtra state in Western India. The 2011 Census of India recorded a total of 355 residents in the village. Padle's geographical area is 151 hectares (370 acres).
