= Kongle =

Village in Maharashtra, India

- Village
- Interactive map of Kongle
- Country: India
- State: Maharashtra

Kongle is a small village in Ratnagiri district, Maharashtra state in Western India. The 2011 Census of India recorded a total of 351 residents in the village. Kongle's geographical area is 438 hectares (1,080 acres).
