= Gaontale =

Village in Maharashtra

- Village
- Interactive map of Gaontale
- Country: India
- State: Maharashtra

Gaontale is a small village in Ratnagiri district, Maharashtra state in Western India. The 2011 Census of India recorded a total of 681 residents in the village. Gaontale is 399.66 hectares in size.
