= Jamge =

Village in Maharashtra

- Village
- Interactive map of Jamge
- Country: India
- State: Maharashtra

Jamge is a small village in Ratnagiri district, Maharashtra state in Western India. The 2011 Census of India recorded a total of 1,552 residents in the village. Jamge's geographical area is 680 hectares (1,700 acres).
