= Walane =

Village in Maharashtra

Walane is a small village in Ratnagiri district, Maharashtra state in Western India. The 2011 Census of India recorded a total of 313 residents in the village. Walane is 385 hectares in size.
