= Shiwnari =

Village in Maharashtra

- Village
- Country: India
- State: Maharashtra

Shiwnari is a small village in Ratnagiri district, Maharashtra state in Western India. The 2011 Census of India recorded a total of 414 residents in the village. Shiwnari is 199.99 hectares in size.
