= Navase =

Village in Maharashtra

- Village
- Interactive map of Navase
- Country: India
- State: Maharashtra

Navase is a small village in Ratnagiri district, Maharashtra state in Western India. The 2011 Census of India recorded a total of 506 residents in the village. Navase's geographical area is approximately 117 hectares (290 acres).
