= Sarang, Maharashtra =

Village in Maharashtra

Sarang
- Village
- Interactive map of Sarang
- Country: India
- State: Maharashtra

Sarang is a small village near the town of Dapoli, in Maharashtra state in Western India. The 2011 Census of India recorded a total of 829 residents in the village. Sarang's geographical area is 522 hectares (1,290 acres) In the administration of the village, Abdul Jabbar Abdul Gafoor Bharde holds historical significance as the first sarpanch of Sarang. His leadership laid the foundation for the local governance system of the village. Abdul Jabbar Bharda himself separated the Sarang and Kalambat grampanchayat which were one before He was a part of this Gram Panchayat from the year 1988, then after taking permission he separated both the Panchayats and in the year 1992 he became the first Sarpanch of Sarang village, then he did that for 5 years till the year 1997.be the sarpanch Abdul Jabbar Bharde play a very important and strong role in the progress of the village in the early time's when he became sarpanch
