= Sondeghar =

Village in Maharashtra

- Village
- Country: India
- State: Maharashtra

Sondeghar is a small village in Ratnagiri district, Maharashtra state in Western India. The 2011 Census of India recorded a total of 932 residents in the village. Sondeghar is 452 hectares in size.
