= Tamond =

Village in Maharashtra

- Village
- Interactive map of Tamond
- Country: India
- State: Maharashtra

Tamond is a small village in Ratnagiri district, Maharashtra state in Western India. The 2017 Census of India recorded a total of 348 residents in the village. Tamond's geographical area is approximately 244 hectares (600 acres).
