= Karanjani =

Village in Maharashtra

- Village
- Interactive map of Karanjani
- Country: India
- State: Maharashtra

Karanjani is a small village in Ratnagiri district, Maharashtra state in Western India. The 2011 Census of India recorded a total of 1,097 residents in the village. Karanjani's geographical area is 941 hectares (2,330 acres).
