= Oxford Nanoimaging =

ONI
- Headquarters: United Kingdom
- Website: oni.bio

ONI is a start-up company based in Oxford manufacturing super-resolution microscopes.

== Background ==
ONI is a spin-out from Oxford University, originally incorporated in February 2016 and began trading in May 2016.

In May 2016 ONI announced it has raised £1.2 million in seed funding to develop the microscope and launch the product to market. The first product released was the Nanoimager.

In April 2017, ONI raised another £3 million, and in July 2018 raised a $25 million Series A funding round.

In October 2018, the Institute of Physics (IOP) awarded the Business Start-up Award 2018 to ONI. In November 2018, Fast Track included ONI in the Disruptors to Watch list.
