= Pandhari =

Village in Maharashtra

- Village
- Interactive map of Pandhari
- Country: India
- State: Maharashtra

Pandhari is a village in Ratnagiri district, Maharashtra state in Western India. The 2011 Census of India recorded a total of 5,780 residents in the village. Pandhari's geographical area is 57 hectares (140 acres).
