= Mele, Maharashtra =

Village in Maharashtra

- Location in Maharashtra Mele, Maharashtra (India)
- Coordinates: 17.6512°N 73.1828°E

Population
  - Total: 558

Mele is a small village in Ratnagiri district, Maharashtra state in Western India. The 2011 Census of India recorded a total of 558 residents in the village. Mele, Maharashtra's geographical area is 415 hectares (1,030 acres).
