= Chandikanagar =

Village in Maharashtra, India

- Village
- Interactive map of Chandikanagar
- Country: India
- State: Maharashtra

Chandikanagar is a small village in Ratnagiri district, Maharashtra state in Western India. The 2011 Census of India recorded a total of 662 residents in the village. Chandikanagar is 402.89 hectares in size.
