= Satere Tarf Haveli =

Village in Maharashtra

- Village
- Interactive map of Satere Tarf Haveli
- Country: India
- State: Maharashtra

Satere Tarf Haveli is a small village in Ratnagiri district, Maharashtra state in Western India. The 2011 Census of India recorded a total of 189 residents in the village. Satere Tarf Haveli's geographical area is approximately 202 hectares (500 acres).
