= Sahilnagar =

Village in Maharashtra

- Village
- Interactive map of Sahilnagar
- Country: India
- State: Maharashtra

Sahilnagar is a small village in Ratnagiri district, Maharashtra state in Western India. The 2011 Census of India recorded a total of 304 residents in the village. Sahilnagar's geographical area is approximately 207 hectares (510 acres).
