= Usgaon =

Village in Maharashtra, India

Usgaon is a small village in Ratnagiri district, Maharashtra state in Western India. The 2011 Census of India recorded a total of 1,450 residents in the village. Usgaon is 471.32 hectares in size.
