= Derde, Maharashtra =

Village in Maharashtra

Derde
- Village
- Interactive map of Derde
- Country: India
- State: Maharashtra

Derde is a small village in Dapoli taluka Ratnagiri district, Maharashtra state in Western India. The 2011 Census of India recorded a total of 486 residents in the village. Derde's geographical area is 199 hectares (490 acres).
