= Bhopan =

Village in Maharashtra

- Village
- Interactive map of Bhopan
- Country: India
- State: Maharashtra

Bhopan is a small village in Ratnagiri district, Maharashtra state in Western India. The 2011 Census of India recorded a total of 984 residents in the village. Bhopan's geographical area is 729 hectares (1,800 acres).
