= Wavghar =

Village in Maharashtra

Wavghar is a small village in Ratnagiri district, Maharashtra state in Western India. The 2011 Census of India recorded a total of 1,088 residents in the village. Wavghar's geographical area is approximately 315 hectares (780 acres).
