= Turavade =

Village in Maharashtra

Turavade is a small village in Ratnagiri district, Maharashtra state in Western India. The 2011 Census of India recorded a total of 37 residents in the village. Turavade's geographical area is 70 hectares (170 acres).
