= Kawadoli =

Village in Maharashtra

- Village
- Country: India
- State: Maharashtra

Kawadoli is a small village in Ratnagiri district, Maharashtra state in Western India. The 2011 Census of India recorded a total of 462 residents in the village. Kawadoli's geographical area is 180 hectares (440 acres).
