= Umbarshet =

Village in Maharashtra

Umbarshet is a small village in Ratnagiri district, Maharashtra state in Western India. The 2011 Census of India recorded a total of 1,046 residents in the village. Umbarshet's geographical area is 515 hectares (1,270 acres).
