= Kelil =

Village in Maharashtra

- Village
- Interactive map of Kelil
- Country: India
- State: Maharashtra

Kelil is a small village in Ratnagiri district, Maharashtra state in Western India. The 2011 Census of India recorded a total of 319 residents in the village. Kelil's geographical area is 194 hectares (480 acres).
