= Dalkhan, Maharashtra =

Village in Maharashtra

Dalkhan
- Village
- Interactive map of Dalkhan
- Coordinates: 17°50′19″N 73°10′34″E
- Country: India
- State: Maharashtra

Dalkhan is a small village in Ratnagiri district, Maharashtra state in Western India. The 2011 Census of India recorded a total of 123 residents in the village. Dalkhan's geographical area is 227 hectares (560 acres).
