= Dauli =

Village in Maharashtra

- Village
- Interactive map of Dauli
- Country: India
- State: Maharashtra

Dauli is a small village in Ratnagiri district, Maharashtra state in Western India. The 2011 Census of India recorded a total of 358 residents in the village. Dauli's geographical area is 898 hectares (2,220 acres).
