= Bondivali =

Village in Maharashtra

- Village
- Country: India
- State: Maharashtra

Bondivali is a small village in Ratnagiri district, Maharashtra state in Western India.

== Population ==
The 2011 Census of India recorded a total of 537 residents in the village.

== Geography ==
Bondivali's geographical area is 728 hectares (1,800 acres).
