= Dabhil =

Village in Maharashtra

Coordinates: 17°39′N 73°28′E

- Village
- Interactive map of Dabhil
- Country: India
- State: Maharashtra

Dabhil is a small village located near the town of Khed, in Ratnagiri district, Maharashtra state in Western India. The 2011 Census of India recorded a total of 1,047 residents in the village. Specially known for non chamecalise pure Alphanso Mangoes which has huge demand in Kuwait, UAE, South Africa and many more. Dabhil is 876.47 hectares in size.
