= Chinchali, Maharashtra =

Village in Maharashtra, India

Chinchali
- Village
- Interactive map of Chinchali
- Coordinates: 17°51′20″N 73°19′18″E
- Country: India
- State: Maharashtra

Chinchali is a small village in Ratnagiri district, Maharashtra state in Western India. The 2011 Census of India recorded a total of 496 residents in the village. Chinchali is 211 hectares in size.
