= Satamba =

Village in Maharashtra

Coordinates: 19°49′N 77°07′E

- Village
- Interactive map of Satamba
- Country: India
- State: Maharashtra

Satamba is a small village in Ratnagiri district, Maharashtra state in Western India. The 2011 Census of India recorded a total of 158 residents in the village. Satamba's geographical area is 276 hectares (680 acres).
