= Ilane, Maharashtra =

Village in Maharashtra

Ilane
- Village
- Interactive map of Ilane
- Coordinates: 17.8848052°N 73.0999052°E
- Country: India
- State: Maharashtra

Ilane is a small village in Ratnagiri district, Maharashtra state in Western India. The 2011 Census of India recorded a total of 277 residents in the village. Ilane's geographical area is 344 hectares (850 acres).
