= Bandhativare =

Village in Maharashtra

- Village
- Interactive map of Bandhativare
- Coordinates: 17°48′48″N 73°11′44″E
- Country: India
- State: Maharashtra

Bandhativare is a small village in Ratnagiri district, Maharashtra state in Western India. The 2011 Census of India recorded a total of 638 residents in the village. Bandhativare's geographical area is 754 hectares (1,860 acres).
