= Velas, Maharashtra =

Village in Maharashtra

Velas
- village
- Location in Maharashtra, India Velas (India)
- Coordinates: 17.9585°N 73.0498°E
- Country: India
- State: Maharashtra
- District: Ratnagiri

Government
  - Body: Gram panchayat

Languages
  - Official: Marathi
- Time zone: UTC+5:30 (IST)
- ISO 3166 code: IN-MH
- Website: maharashtra.gov.in

Velas is a village in Ratnagiri district of Maharashtra, India. It is noted as a birthplace of Nana Phadnis, a n influential statesman of the Maratha Empire. It is also famous for its beaches and turtle festival, which is held by the local people of Velas and Sahyadri Nisarg Mitra, Chiploon.
