= Soveli =

Village in Maharashtra

- Village
- Interactive map of Soveli
- Country: India
- State: Maharashtra

Soveli is a small village in dapooli, Ratnagiri district, Maharashtra state in Western India. The 2011 Census of India recorded a total of 867 residents in the village, which has a geographical area of 464 hectares (1,150 acres).
