= Oni, Maharashtra =

Village in Maharashtra

Oni
- Village
- Interactive map of Oni
- Coordinates: 16°43′11″N 73°34′32″E
- Country: India
- State: Maharashtra

Oni is a small village in Ratnagiri district, Maharashtra state in Western India. The 2011 Census of India recorded a total of 1,118 residents in the village. Oni is 30 hectares in size.
