= Harnai, Maharashtra =

Village in Maharashtra

Harnai
- Village
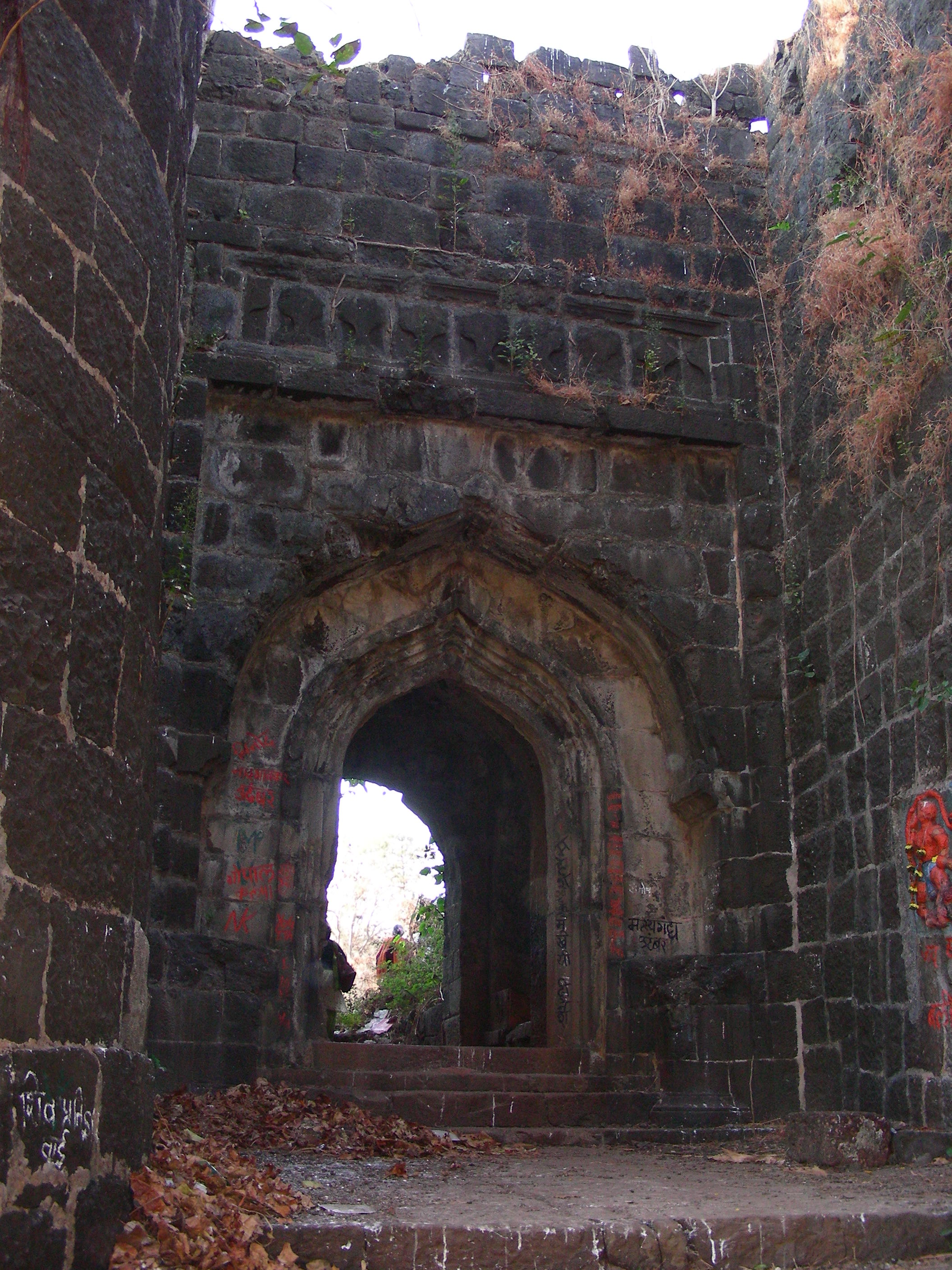
- Entrance to Suvarnadurg
- Interactive map of Harnai
- Country: India
- State: Maharashtra

Population
  - Total: 7,274

Harnai is a small town in Dapoli C.D. block, in Ratnagiri district, Maharashtra state in Western India. The 2011 Census of India recorded a total of 7,274 residents in the village. Harnai's geographical area is 591 hectares (1,460 acres).

Harnai has a long coastline and varied flora and fauna. Harnai is known for its beaches, which are popular places for meditation. Harnai's light house is a major tourist attraction, from which one can get a 360º degree view of Harnai.

== Suvarnadurg ==
Suvarnadurg is a fort that is located on a small island in the Arabian Sea, near Harnai in Konkan, a rugged section of the coastline along the West Coast of India.

Suvarnadurg fort was built in the 16th century during the rule of emperor Adilshah. In 1660, Chhatrapati Shivaji Maharaj defeated Adilshah the second and added this fort to the Maratha empire. In the year 1688, after the death of Shivaji, Rajaram appointed Sarkhel Kanhoji Aangre as the authority over this fort. This fort was a headquarter to the great soldier Kanhoji Aangre who was known as the Shivaji of the sea. From Kanhoji to Tulaji, this fort remained under the command and control of the Aangre family. In the year 1755, this fort came under the rule of the Peshwas and later, under the British in the year 1818. This fort continued to be under the British until Independence. Suvarnadurg fort at Harnai, is the oldest forts in Dapoli.

== Goa Fort ==
The Harnai port at Dapoli Taluka has a group of 3 forts, namely Kanakadurga, Fateh Gadh and Goa Fort. There is no proper information about who built these forts, but it is known that these forts were built to strategically support and protect the main Suvarnadurg fort. Among these 3 forts, Goa Fort spreads in a surface area of three and a quarter hectors. The fort is surrounded by sea on the western and northern sides and has a natural high rise at the southern part. There are remains of structures on this high rise.

== Kanakdurg Fort ==
Along with Kanakdurg Fort, Fattegad and Gova Fort are supporting forts to the great marine fort Suvarnadurga at Harnai in Dapoli. Among these sub-forts, Kanakdurg Fort is the closest to Harnai Port. Kanakdurg Fort is surrounded by the sea on all 3 sides and has a surface area of about a quarter hectare. This fort has an oval shape and the fort is accessible through a set of stairs. At the end of the stairs, there is a water tank on the right-hand side at a lower level.

== Climate ==
Climate data for Harnai (1991–2020, extremes 1943–2020)
Month	Jan	Feb	Mar	Apr	May	Jun	Jul	Aug	Sep	Oct	Nov	Dec	Year
Record high °C (°F)	35.9 (96.6)	37.3 (99.1)	40.4 (104.7)	36.9 (98.4)	39.0 (102.2)	39.8 (103.6)	35.1 (95.2)	32.3 (90.1)	35.0 (95.0)	37.0 (98.6)	37.6 (99.7)	35.9 (96.6)	40.4 (104.7)
Mean daily maximum °C (°F)	28.7 (83.7)	28.7 (83.7)	29.7 (85.5)	30.8 (87.4)	31.6 (88.9)	30.9 (87.6)	29.4 (84.9)	29.0 (84.2)	29.5 (85.1)	31.5 (88.7)	32.4 (90.3)	30.9 (87.6)	30.3 (86.5)
Mean daily minimum °C (°F)	21.3 (70.3)	21.7 (71.1)	23.2 (73.8)	25.1 (77.2)	26.6 (79.9)	25.6 (78.1)	24.7 (76.5)	24.4 (75.9)	24.3 (75.7)	24.6 (76.3)	24.2 (75.6)	22.7 (72.9)	24.1 (75.4)
Record low °C (°F)	12.8 (55.0)	13.2 (55.8)	16.1 (61.0)	17.8 (64.0)	20.0 (68.0)	13.3 (55.9)	18.0 (64.4)	12.5 (54.5)	20.2 (68.4)	18.5 (65.3)	17.6 (63.7)	14.6 (58.3)	12.5 (54.5)
Average rainfall mm (inches)	0.1 (0.00)	0.0 (0.0)	0.3 (0.01)	1.1 (0.04)	23.2 (0.91)	756.4 (29.78)	992.3 (39.07)	591.5 (23.29)	429.9 (16.93)	108.4 (4.27)	9.4 (0.37)	2.8 (0.11)	2,915.4 (114.78)
Average rainy days	0.1	0.0	0.1	0.1	1.3	16.8	25.3	22.7	14.3	4.6	0.4	0.3	86.0
Average relative humidity (%) (at 17:30 IST)	67	69	71	73	75	82	86	85	82	76	67	66	75
Source: India Meteorological Department
