= Apti, Maharashtra =

Village in Maharashtra

Apti
- Village
- Interactive map of Apti
- Coordinates: 17.7338852°N 73.2400453°E
- Country: India
- State: Maharashtra

Apti is a small village in Ratnagiri district, Maharashtra state in Western India. The 2011 Census of India recorded a total of 538 residents in the village. Apti's geographical area is approximately 359 hectares (890 acres).
