= Revali Mahotsav, India =

Village in Maharashtra, India

Revali Village
- Village
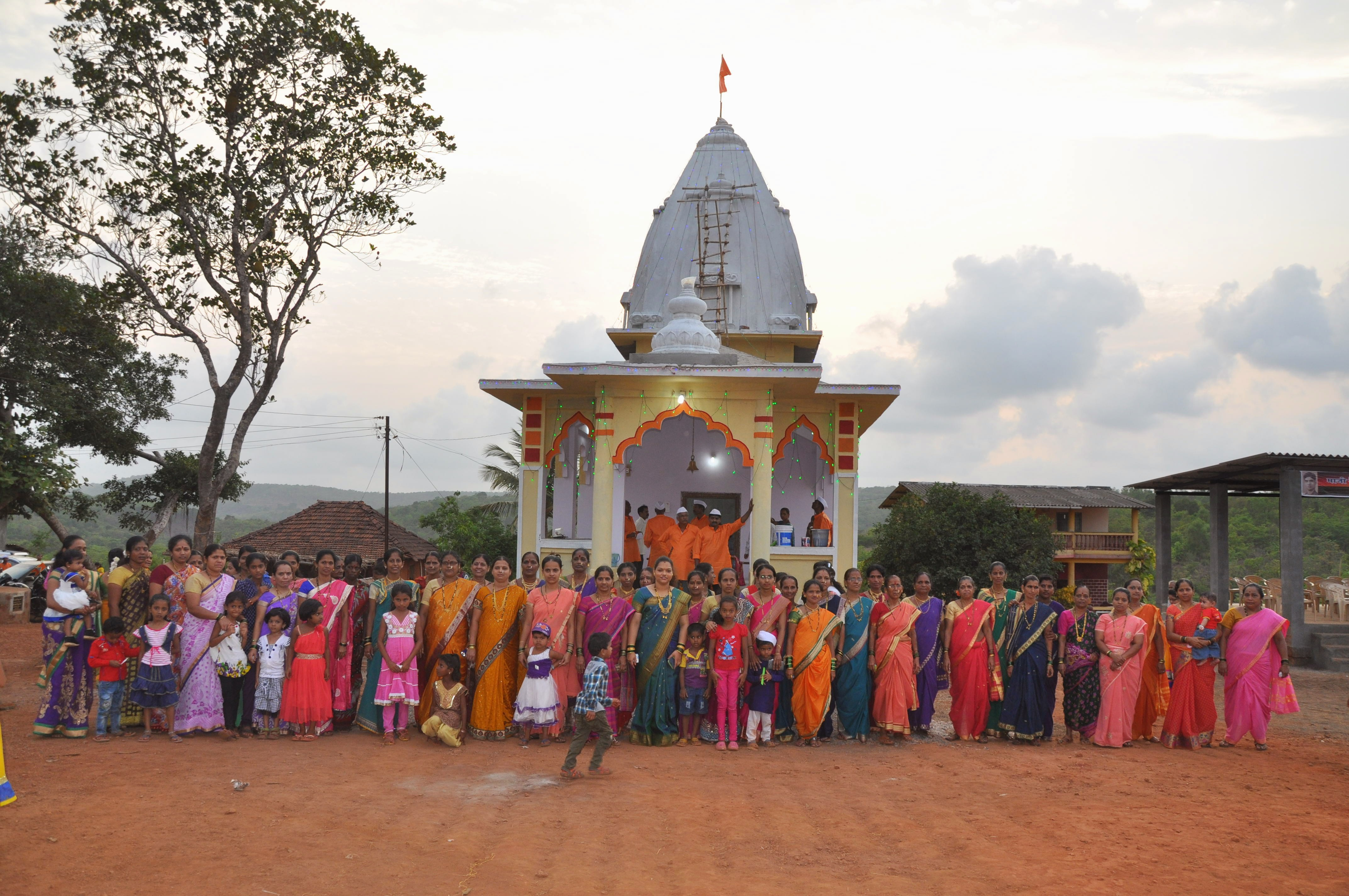
- Revali Mahotsav
- Interactive map of Revali Village
- Country: India
- State: Maharashtra

Revali is a small village in Ratnagiri district, Maharashtra state in Western India. The 2011 Census of India recorded a total of 208 residents in the village. Revali Mahostsav's geographical area is 502 hectares (1,240 acres).
