= Nigade, Ratnagiri =

Village in Maharashtra

Nigade
- Village
- Interactive map of Nigade
- Country: India
- State: Maharashtra

Nigade is a small village in Ratnagiri district, Maharashtra state in Western India. The 2011 Census of India recorded a total of 752 residents in the village. Nigade is 577.34 hectares in size.
