= Dapoli =

- Rural Area Of Konkan Region
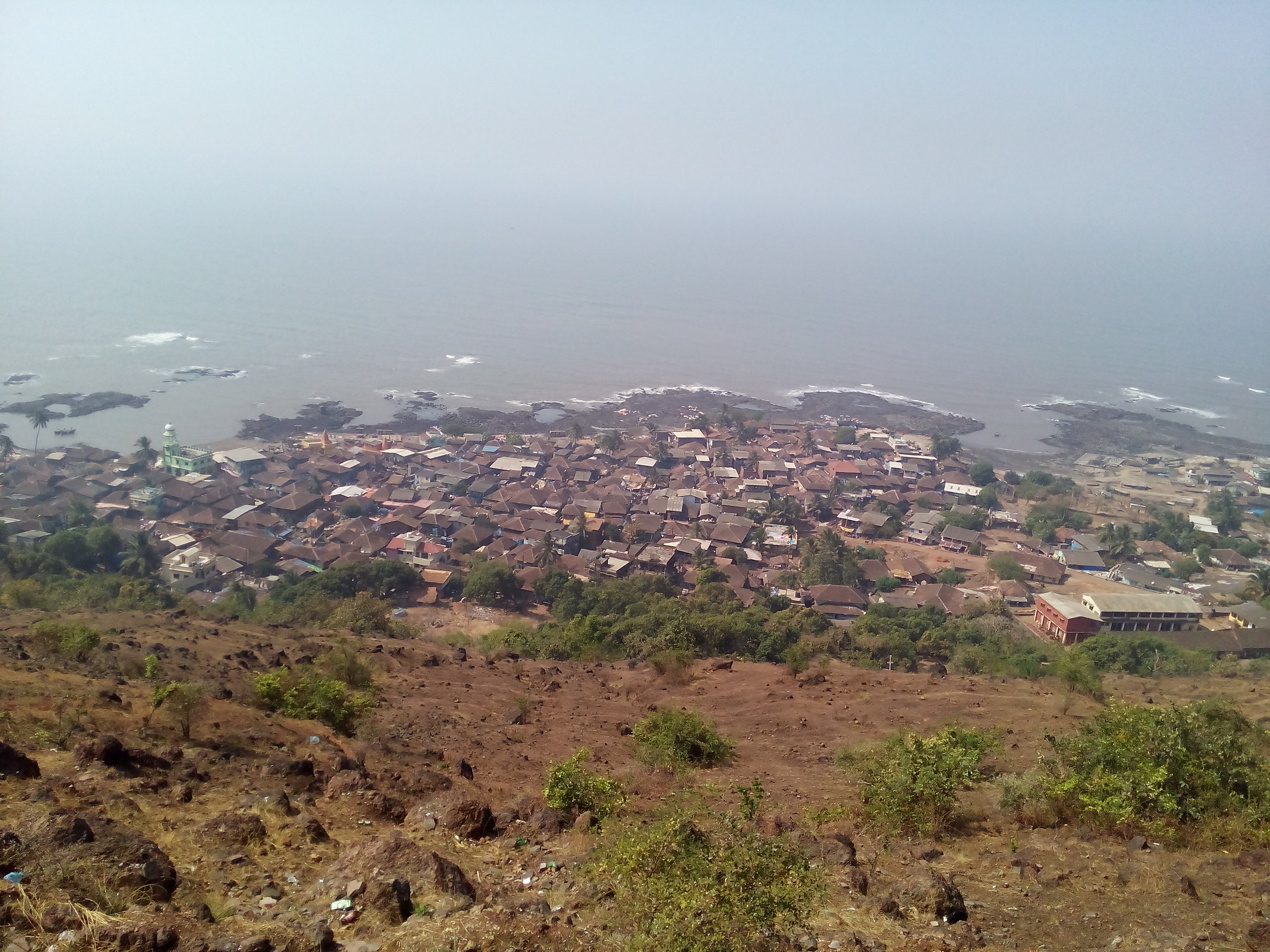
- View of Pajpandhari, Dapoli

- Location in Maharashtra, India
- Coordinates: 17°45′32″N 73°11′8″E
- Country: India
- State: Maharashtra
- District: Ratnagiri

Government
  - Type: Municipal Council
  - Body: Dapoli Municipal Council

Area
  - Total: 26.11 km^{2} (10.08 sq mi)
- Elevation: 243.84 m (800.0 ft)

Population (2011)
  - Total: 34,544
  - Density: 1,323/km^{2} (3,427/sq mi)
- Demonym: Dapolikar

Language
  - Official: Marathi
- Time zone: UTC+5:30 (IST)
- PIN: 415712
- Telephone code: 02358
- Vehicle registration: MH-08
- Nearest town: Khed

Dapoli is a town and taluka in the Ratnagiri district of Maharashtra, India. It lies 215 km (134 mi) south of the state capital of Mumbai. The town is also known as Camp Dapoli, as the British had set their camps here. Many high-ranking British officers' graves are found in this town. There is also an abandoned church from the time of the British Raj. Dapoli was administered by a Municipal Council.

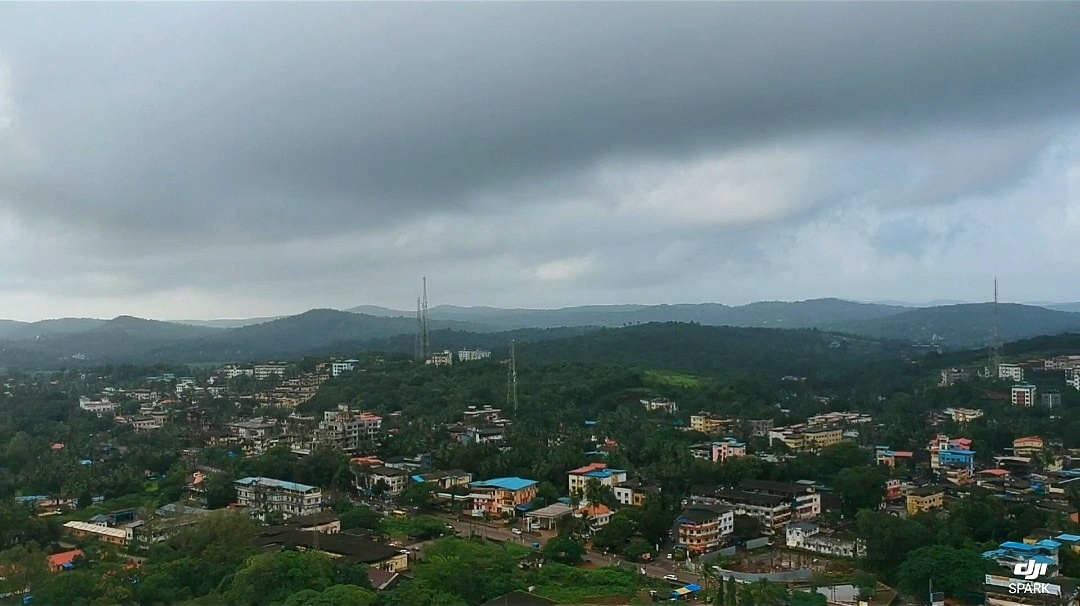
Aerial View of Dapoli Town

== Geography ==
Dapoli is separated from the Sahyadri range and is bordered by the Khed taluk in the east, and is also bordered by Mandangad taluk in the north, Guhagar taluk to the south, and Chiplun taluka to the southeast. The Arabian sea forms the sub-district's western border.

Dapoli has a seaboard of 50 km (31 mi) which stretches from Velas, Maharashtra Velas, – Kelshi in the North to Dabhol in the South. The coastline differs in its general characteristics from other parts of Konkan. It is densely covered by coconut farms. The principal rivers are Bharja in the north and Vashishthi in the south. A small river called the Jog river flows through Bandhativare, Sarang and Tadil into the Arabian Sea.

The town is located above a diamond mine located in the Earth's crust. The mine has over 900 kilograms of diamond in it. It is located 8 km (5.0 mi) from the Arabian Sea. It also serves as the headquarters of its namesake taluk and is a major centre for most villages nearby.

== Education ==
1. Ramraje College of Nursing affiliated to Maharashtra University of Health Science (MUHS) Nasik https://ramrajecollege.com/
2. Ramraje School of Nursing affiliated to Maharashtra State Board of Nursing and Paramedical Education Mumbai
3. Ramraje College of Pharmacy affiliated to Maharashtra University of Health Science (MUHS) Nasik
4. Ramraje College of Physiotherapy affiliated to Maharashtra University of Health Science (MUHS) Nasik
5. Dr. Balasaheb Sawant Konkan Krishi Vidyapeeth, one of the biggest agriculture universities in Maharashtra.
6. A. G. High School is one of the oldest schools here, named after the British Alfred Gadney.
7. R.R. Vaidya English Medium School
8. Saraswati Vidyamandir English Medium School, affiliated to the Central Board of Secondary Education (CBSE)
9. National High School & Junior College Of Science, Commerce and Arts.
10. Dnyandeep Vidyamandir
11. Lokmannya Tilak Vidyamandir
12. Dapoli Urban Bank Senior Science College
13. N.K.Varadkar Arts & R.V.Belose Commerce College
14. U.A. Dalvi English Medium High School
15. Saroj Mehta International School
16. Ram Raje High School and Senior College
17. Ram Raje College of Hotel Management and Catering Technology
18. UK Public school Mauje dapoli (CBSE)

There are many other schools present in the town affiliated to state and central education boards.

Dapoli has a centre for the ISKCON movement, youth programs for agriculture, and an undergraduate homeopathic college (Dapoli Homeopathic Medical College).

== Villages in Dapoli ==
Sarang

Tadil

== Places to visit ==
1. Unhavare Natural Hot Water Spring
2. Kadyavarcha Ganpati Temple, Anjarle
3. Palande Beach
4. Karde Beach
5. Mahalaxmi Mandir, Kelshi
6. Maruti Temple
7. Shree Kalkai Devi Temple
8. Ladghar Beach
9. Murud Beach
10. Murud Bypass view point
11. Keshavraj Temple
12. Parshuram Bhumi
13. Panhalekaji Caves
14. Dabhol Beach
15. Dabhol Ferry Boat
16. Shivaji Maharaj Statue
17. Ambedkar Garden
18. Burondi
19. Harnai Bandar

== Beach ==
1. Harnai beach
2. Anjarle Beach
3. Palande beach
4. Murud beach
5. Saldure beach
6. Ladghar beach
7. Burondi beach
8. Kelshi beach
9. Tamastirtha beach
10. Kolthare beach

== Notable residents ==
Dapoli is considered the birthplace of Dhondo Keshav Karve, whose native village of Murud is located 9 kilometres (5.6 mi) from Dapoli.

Babasaheb Ambedkar was a resident of Kalkai Kond, Dapoli (1893-1896).

Pandurang Vaman Kane(a Bharat Ratna recipient) was a resident of Dapoli.

Pandurang Sadashiv Sane

== Transport ==
Road

Dapoli is connected well by state highways from all parts of Maharashtra. The nearest national highway, NH66, passes through Khed, which is 28 kilometres away. It is also well connected by Maharashtra State Road Transport Corporation and private buses.

Rail

Khed Railway Station, located 29 kilometres away is the nearest from Dapoli. A part of the Konkan Railway, trains to major cities like Mumbai, Margao, and Mangalore are easily available from here.

Air

The nearest international airports are located in Mumbai (215 kilometres), Pune (190 kilometres), Goa (375 kilometers), and Navi Mumbai (185 Kilometres).

== See also ==
- List of villages in Dapoli taluka
