= Patil (Koli title) =

Village chief title in India

Koli Patil
- Honorific title of Koli caste
- Ethnicity: Koli people
- Location: Maharashtra; Karnataka; Goa; Dadra and Nagar Haveli and Daman and Diu
- Varna: Agriculturist
- Parent tribe: Mahadev Kolis; Son Kolis; Malhar Kolis; Pardeshi Kolis; Tokre Kolis
- Demonym: Kolis
- Branches: Koli Patil; Koli Paatil
- Language: Koli language; Marathi; Konkani; Hindi; English
- Religion: Hinduism

The Patil (also known as Gaonpatil and Sarpatil) is a title used by Koli chiefs of villages in Maharashtra.

the Janjira island was built and fortified by Koli chieftain Ram Patil. Koli Patils sometimes called as Gaonpatil which means 'village head' and it is found among both Hindu and Christian Kolis. Patil is hereditary title to the Koli families of Maharashtra. In Koli society, there were several types of Patil

- Police Patil: Police Patil was a service position in Kolis during British Raj and Maratha rule. Kolis who were serving as in-charge of police knowns as Police Patil.
- Zemidar Patil: the Kolis who were village headman or landlord were known as Zemidar Patil. They received the grants of villages from rulers for their services in Princely states, kingdoms and Sultanates.
- Samajik Patil: the Koli people who were responsible to maintain order in Koli society and resolve their problems were called as Samajik Patil.

Kolis of Maharashtra served in Maratha Empire and a Koli Patil who was naval chief in Maratha Navy named Laya was honoured by Shivaji with the title of Sarpatil and grants of villages for his courageous actions and Siddis of Janjira.
