= Koli, Iran =

Koli or Kolli or Kali (Persian: كلي) in Iran may refer to:

- Koli, Ardabil
- Kali, Bushehr
- Kali, East Azerbaijan
- Koli, East Azerbaijan
- Kali, Kermanshah
- Kolli, Sistan and Baluchestan
- Kali, South Khorasan
- Kali, Zanjan
- Koli-ye Olya (disambiguation)
- Koli-ye Sofla (disambiguation)
- Goli, Iran (disambiguation)
