= Kol =

Kol, or KOL may refer to:

== Arts, entertainment and media ==
=== Fictional characters ===
- Isamot Kol, a DC Comics superhero
- Kol, a character from Star Trek: Discovery
- Kol Mikaelson, a character from The Vampire Diaries and its spin-off The Originals
- Kol Skywalker, a member of the Skywalker Family, from Star Wars

=== Other uses in arts, entertainment and media ===
- Kapamilya Online Live, a Philippine livestream channel
- Key opinion leader, a term that could refer to an opinion leader, influencer or Internet celebrity
- Kingdom of Loathing, a 2003 online game
- Kings of Leon, an American rock band
- KKOL (AM), a radio station in Seattle, U.S., call sign KOL 1928–1975
- Radio KOL, an internet children's radio station 2003–2007

== People ==
- Anton Kol (born 1990), Ukrainian Paralympic swimmer
- Erzsébet Kol (1897—1980), Hungarian phycologist
- Moshe Kol (1911–1989), Israeli politician and Zionist activist
- Nellie van Kol (1851–1930), Dutch feminist, educator, and children's author
- Nigel Kol (born 1962), Australian rules footballer
- Kol of Sweden (died c. 1173), Swedish prince

== Places ==
- Kol, Iran
- Kol, Nepal
- Kol Rural LLG, Papua New Guinea
- Aligarh, formerly known as Kol, Uttar Pradesh, India
  - Kol Tehsil, within Aligarh District
- Kol, Raebareli, Uttar Pradesh, India

== Other uses ==
- Kelly Oils Ltd, a fuels merchant in Northern Ireland
- Knights of Labor, an 1880s US labor organization
- Kol ghuva, an extinct species of dinosaur
- Kol people, a group of ethnicities of India
  - Kol uprising, 1831–1832
- Kol language, several languages

== See also ==
- Kohl (disambiguation)
- Koli (disambiguation)
- Koll, a surname
