= Sagargad =

Military installation in Maharashtra, India

Sagargad Fort
- Raigad district, Maharashtra

Site information
- Type: Hill fort
- Owner: Government of India
- Controlled by: Ahmadnagar (1521-1594); Portugal (1594); Maratha Empire (1739-1818); United Kingdom: East India Company (1818-1857); British Raj (1857-1947); India (1947-)
- Open to the public: Yes
- Condition: Ruins

Location
- Shown within Maharashtra
- Coordinates: 18°39′21.9″N 72°57′32.1″E
- Height: 413.61m (1357Ft)

Site history
- Materials: Stone

Sagargad Fort is located in Alibag taluka of Raigad District. The path to the fort starts from Khandale village on Alibag-Pen Road. This fort can be visited all round the year. A gentle walk of 2 hours from the village Khandale can reach us up to the fort. There is a small temple of Mahishasurmardini and a water tank on the way. Also, there is "Dodhane" waterfall on the way. The beauty of the waterfall can be seen in Monsoon. There is a Siddheshwar monastery on the Sagargad machi. The pedestrians can make a night halt in the monastery.

== History ==
Very less is known about this fort. Shivaji Maharaj won this fort from Adilshah in 1660. Sagargad was one of the 23 forts which were handed over to Moghuls in the Treaty of Purandar. It was one of the 16 fortified posts that were given to Kanhoji Angre by Balaji Vishwanath Peshwa in 1713. Prisoners sentenced to death were said to be hurled down from the monkey point of the fort.

== Gallery ==
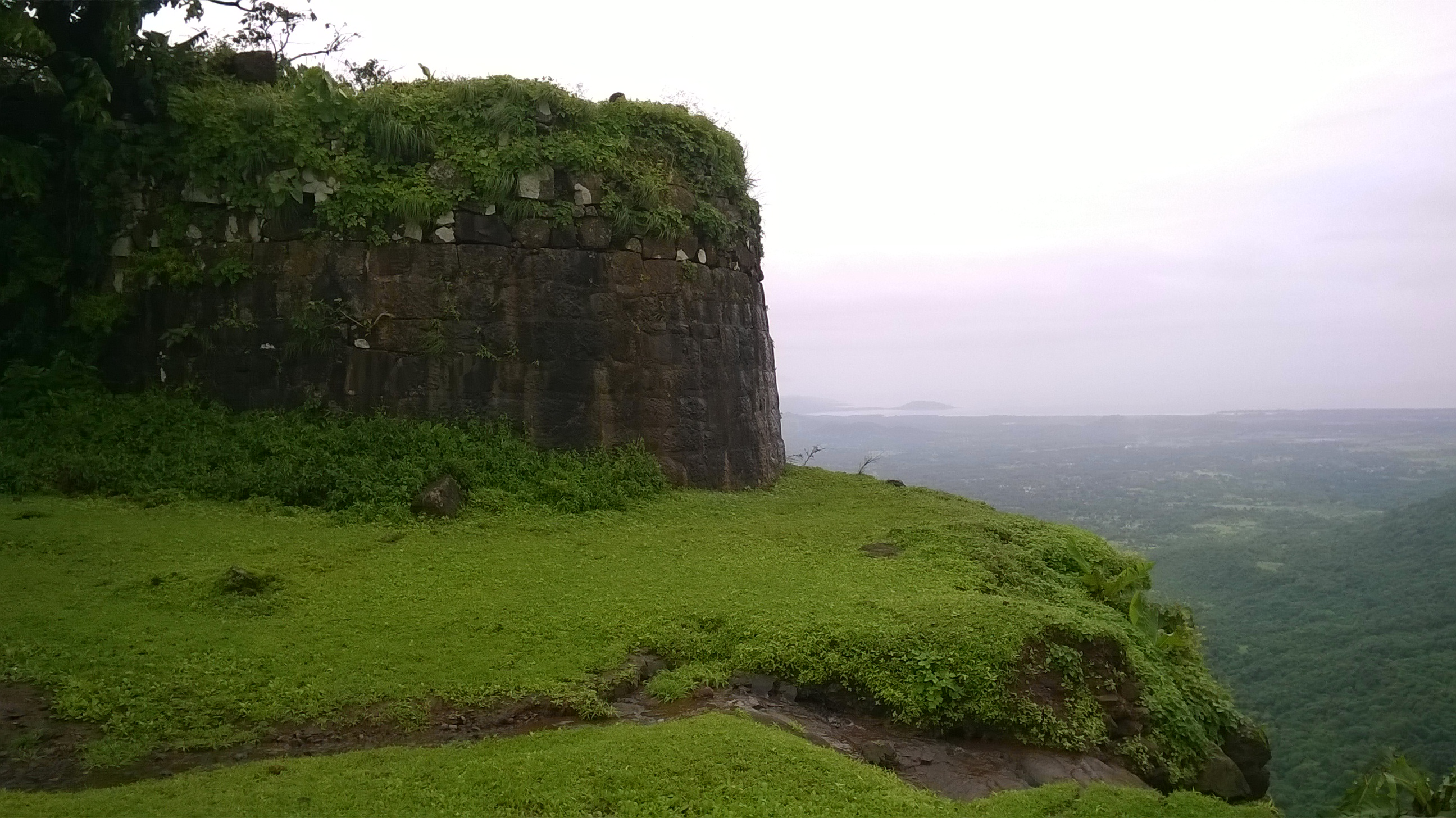
South Bastion of the Fort

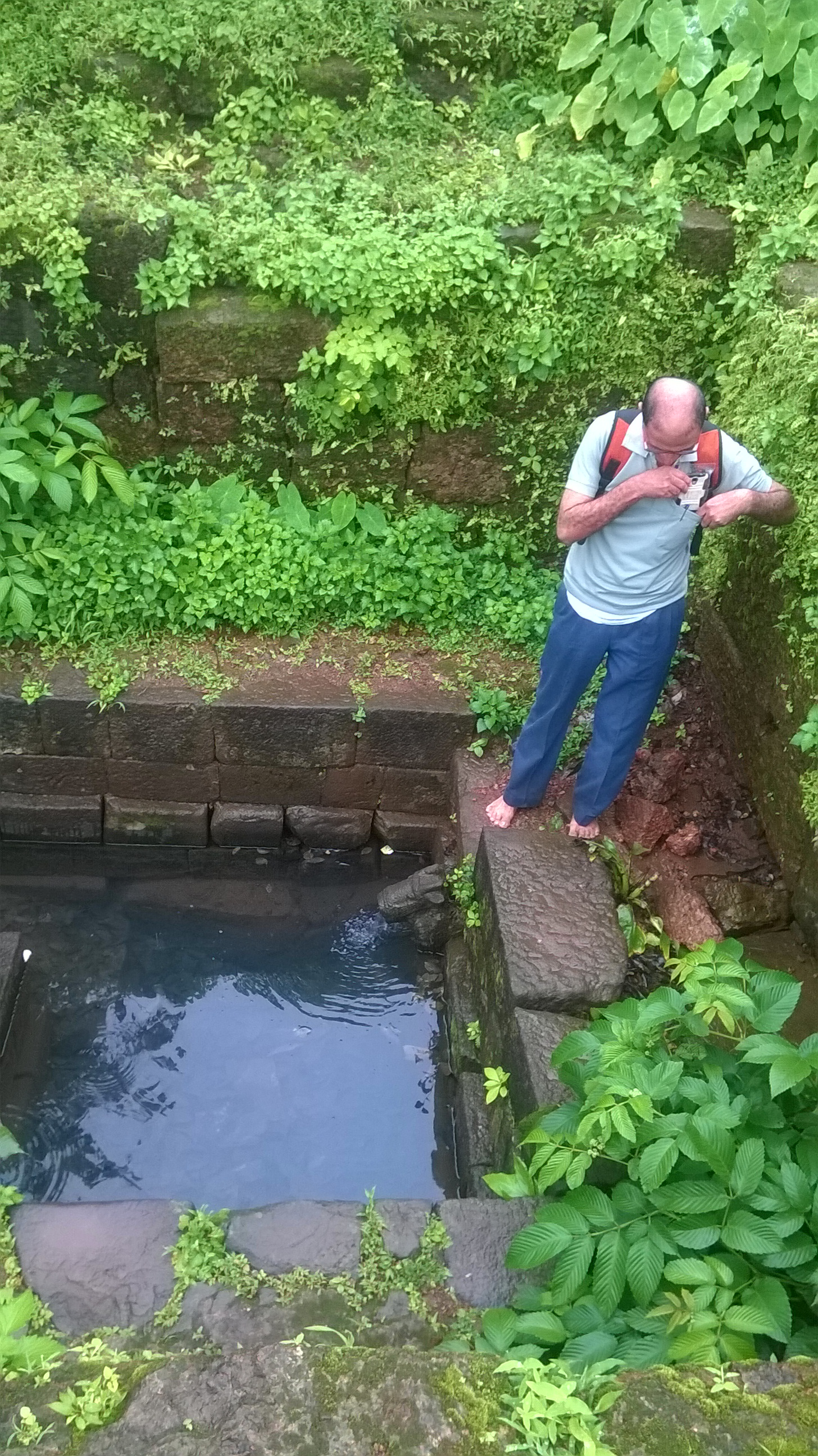
Water cistern

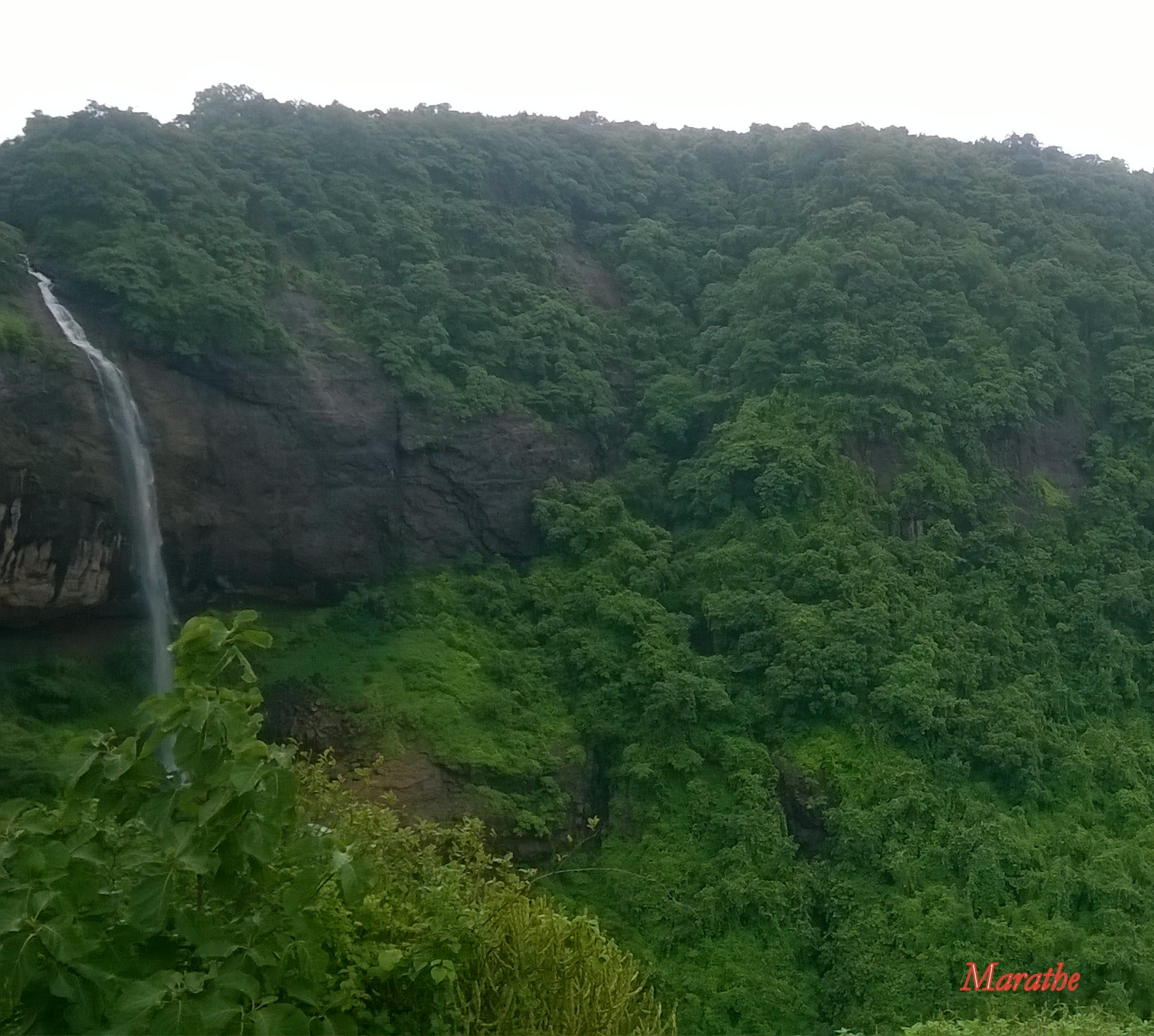
Dodhane water fall

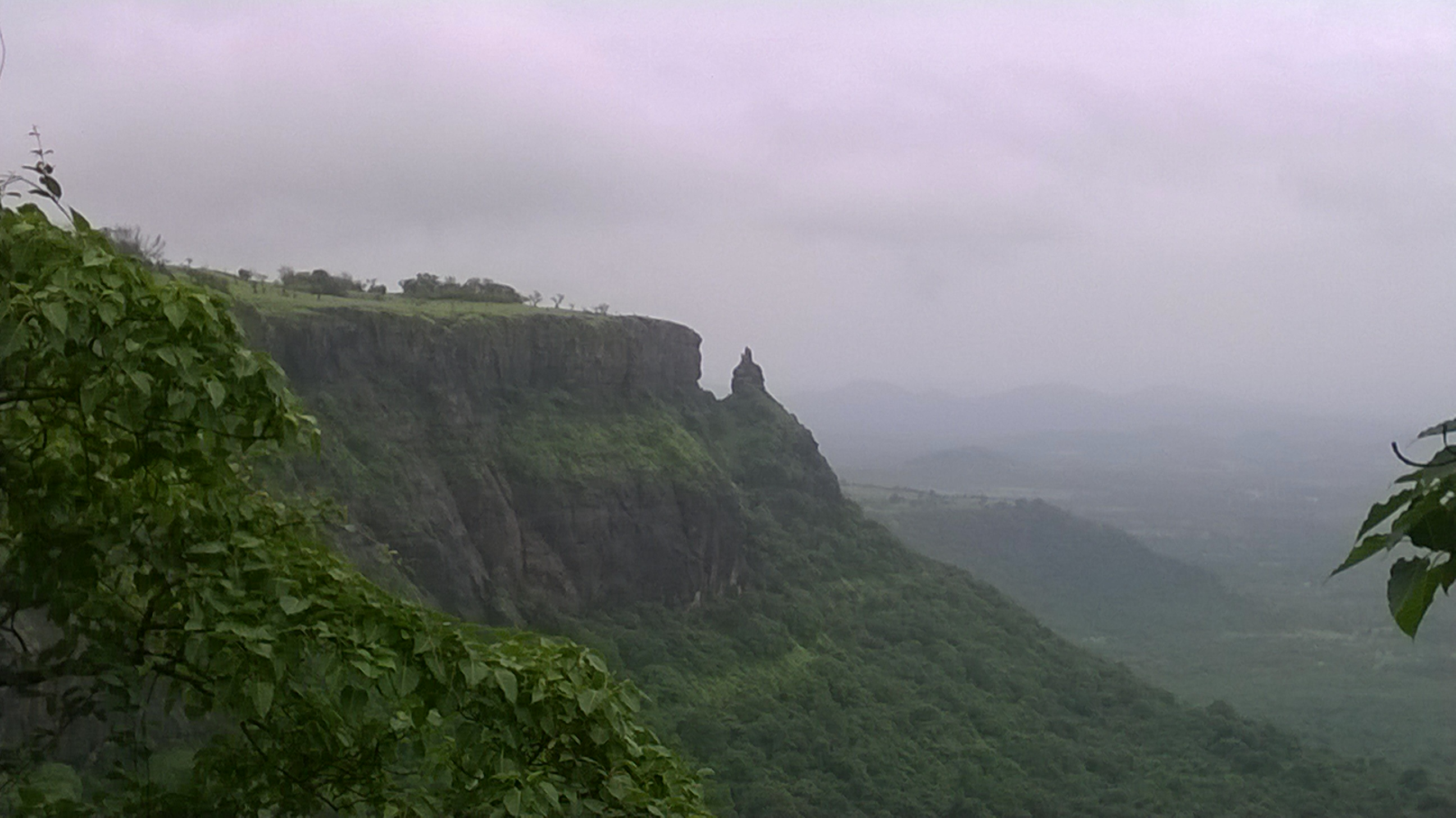
Monkey point

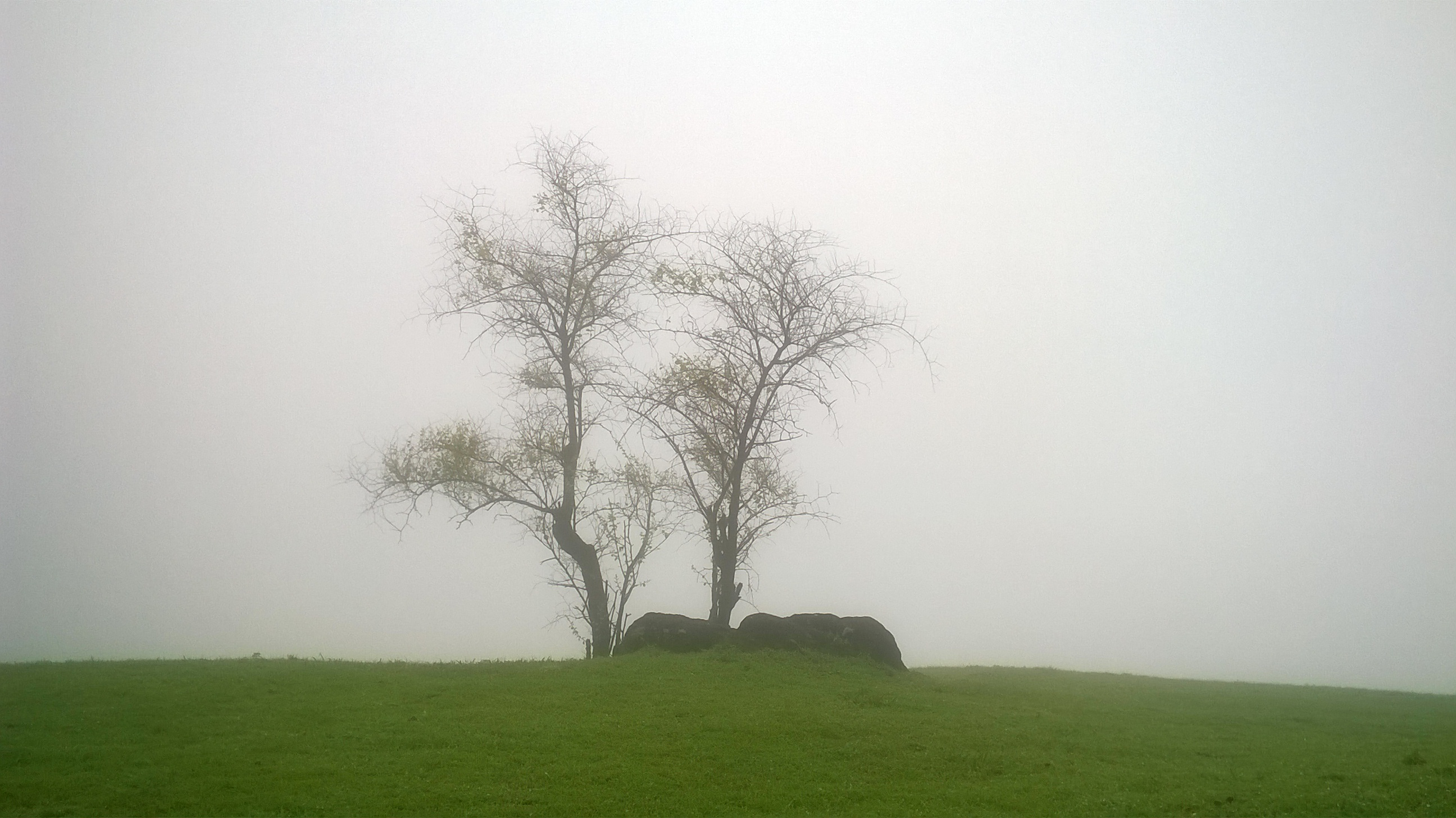
Top of fort in Monsoon

- List of forts in Maharashtra
- List of forts in India
- Marathi People
- Maratha Navy
- List of Maratha dynasties and states
- Maratha War of Independence
- Battles involving the Maratha Empire
- Maratha Army
- Maratha titles
- Military history of India
