= Koli =

Koli may refer to:

== People ==
- Koli people, an Indian ethnic group
  - Koli Christians, a Christian subgroup
  - Muslim Kolis, a Muslim subgroup
- Koli (surname), Indian surname
- Koli Sewabu (born 1975), Fijian rugby union footballer

== Places ==
- Koli, Finland, a mountain in Finland
- Koli National Park, a national park in Finland
- Koli (village), Finland, village in Lieksa, Finland
- Koliwada, India
- Koli, Iran (disambiguation), several places in Iran
- Koli Airfield, a former airfield in the South Pacific
- Koli Cocina de Origen, a restaurant in Nuevo León, Mexico

== Other uses ==
- Koli Geet, an Indian music genre
- The Book of Koli, a novel by Mike Carey
- Koli language (disambiguation), a dialect cluster of Pakistan and India
- KOLI, an FM radio station that serves Wichita Falls, Texas
- Koli Point action, 1942 Allied victory over Japan on Guadalcanal

== See also ==
- Kolli (disambiguation)
- Kol (disambiguation)
- Kori (disambiguation)
