= Koll =

Koll is a surname. Notable people with the surname include:

- Adi Koll (born 1976), Israeli politician
- Bill Koll (1923–2003), American sport wrestler
- Claudia Koll (born 1965), Italian actress
- Dominik Koll (born 1984), Austrian swimmer
- Heinz Koll, Namibian rugby union player
- Manuel Koll (born 1987), Austrian figure skater
- Nathan Trent (born Nathanaele Koll, 1992), Austrian singer
- Reena Koll (born 1996), Estonian pole vaulter
- Richard Koll (1897–1963), German Wehrmacht general
- Rob Koll, American sport wrestler and coach
- Theo Koll (born 1958), German journalist

== See also ==
- Koll Rock, Antarctica
- KOLL, radio station in Arkansas, United States
- Kol (disambiguation)
