= Koli (surname) =

Koli is a surname, and may refer to:

- Mangal Ram Koli, Minister of State in Government of Rajasthan
- Bahadur Singh Koli (born 1961), Indian politician and member of parliament from Bharatpur
- Dharmender Singh Koli, Aam Aadmi party politician from Delhi
- Ganga Ram Koli (born 1937), Indian politician and member of parliament from Rajasthan
- Johnson Koli (born 1953), Solomon Islands politician
- Ousman Koli (born 1988), Gambian footballer
- Ramswaroop Koli, Indian politician and member of parliament from Rajasthan
- Ranjeeta Koli, Indian politician and member of parliament from Rajasthan
- Surender Koli, Indian serial killer
- Prajakta Koli, Indian YouTuber

== See also ==
- Koli (disambiguation)
- Kali (name)
- Koli (disambiguation)
