= Kolli =

Kolli may refer to:

- Kolli, Iran (disambiguation), places in Iran
- Kolli Hills, is a small mountain range located in central Tamil Nadu
- Kolli Pratyagatma, better known as Kotayya Pratyagatma
- Kolli Srinath Reddy, better known as K. Srinath Reddy, is the president of the Public Health Foundation of India
- Rayan Kolli, Algerian professional football player

== See also ==
- Koli (disambiguation)
