= Grab (ship) =

Sailing vessel used on the Malabar Coast

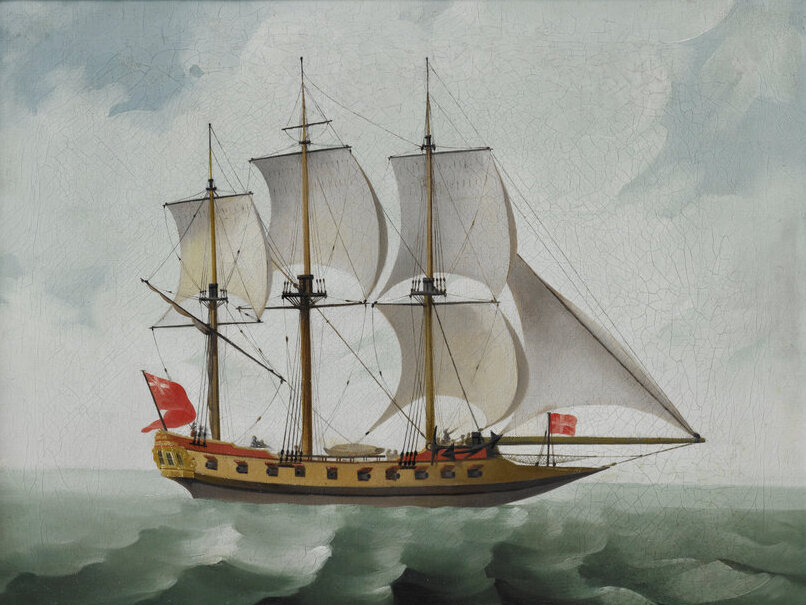
c. 1780 illustration of the Bombay Marine grab HCS Bombay

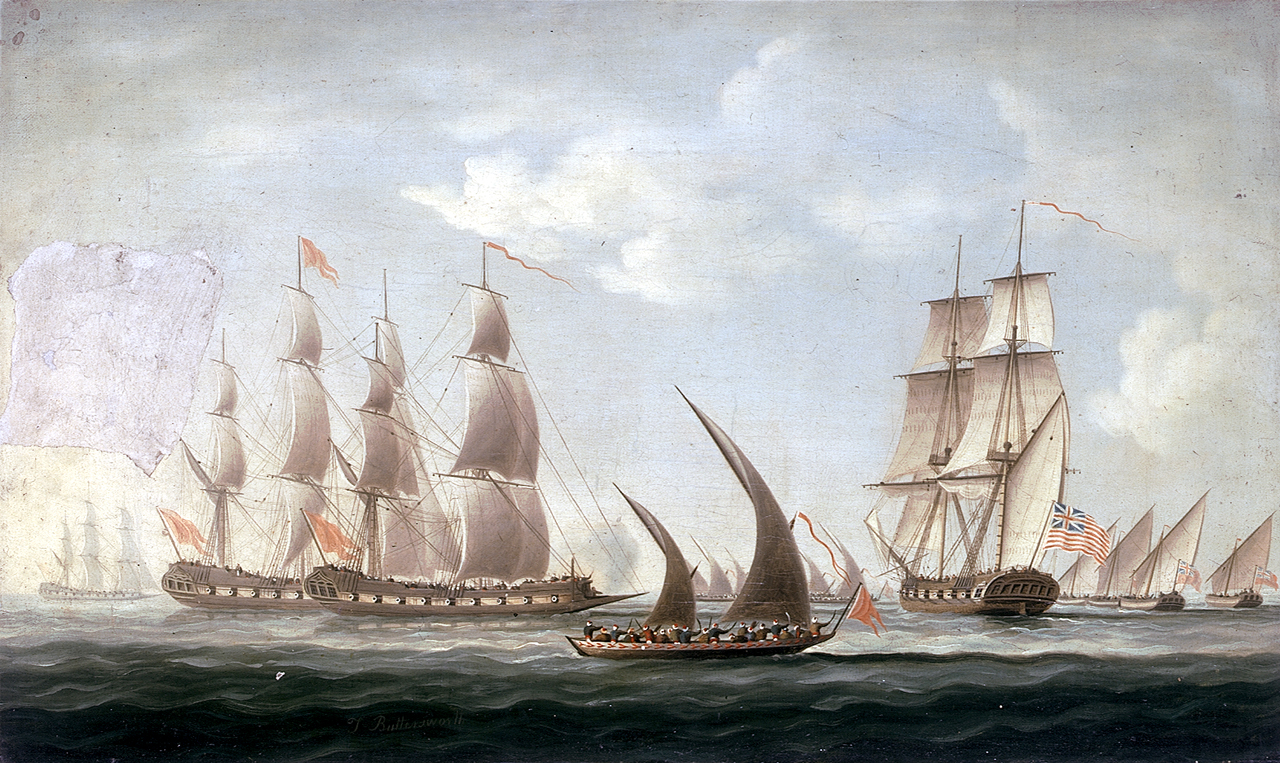
Maratha Navy grabs (left) attacking HCS Aurora in 1816

A grab was a type of ship common on the Malabar Coast in the 18th and 19th centuries. The name derives from "ghurāb" or "ghorāb", Arabic for raven, which in turn came into Marathi and Konkani as "gurab". The ghurāb was originally a galley, but the type evolved.

The grab combined an indigenous hull form with a pointed prow, with or without a bowsprit, combined with European rigging on two to three masts. A description from 1750 states that the grabs of Angria's fleet narrowed from the middle forward and instead of a bow had the prow of a Mediterranean galley, covered with a strong deck level with the main deck but separated from it by a bulkhead. The grab pitched violently when sailing against a head sea so the prow sides were open to permit water easily to run off. On the main deck under the forecastle there were two 6 or 9-pounder guns pointing forward through port-holes cut in the bulkhead and firing over the prow. The grabs then had 6 or 9-pounder guns on their broadsides.

The vessel was generally of shallow draft, and broad in proportion to its length. Size could range between 150 and as much as 500 tons (bm). The sail plan typically was that of a snow, or a brig.

The Bombay Marine, the British East India Company's navy, had two grabs named Bombay that overlapped in their service dates. The Bombay Dockyard built both.

- Bombay, of 43080/94 tons (bm) and 24 guns, was built in 1739 of teak. She spent much of her career convoying vessels on the coast to protect them from pirates operating from states north and south of Bombay. A fire on 29 September 1789 destroyed her in Bombay Harbour.
- Bombay, of 363 tons (bm), and 32 guns, was launched in 1750.

== See also ==
- Gallivat
- Ghurab
- Ghali
- Lancaran
- Dhow
