= Gallivat =

Boat with sails and oars

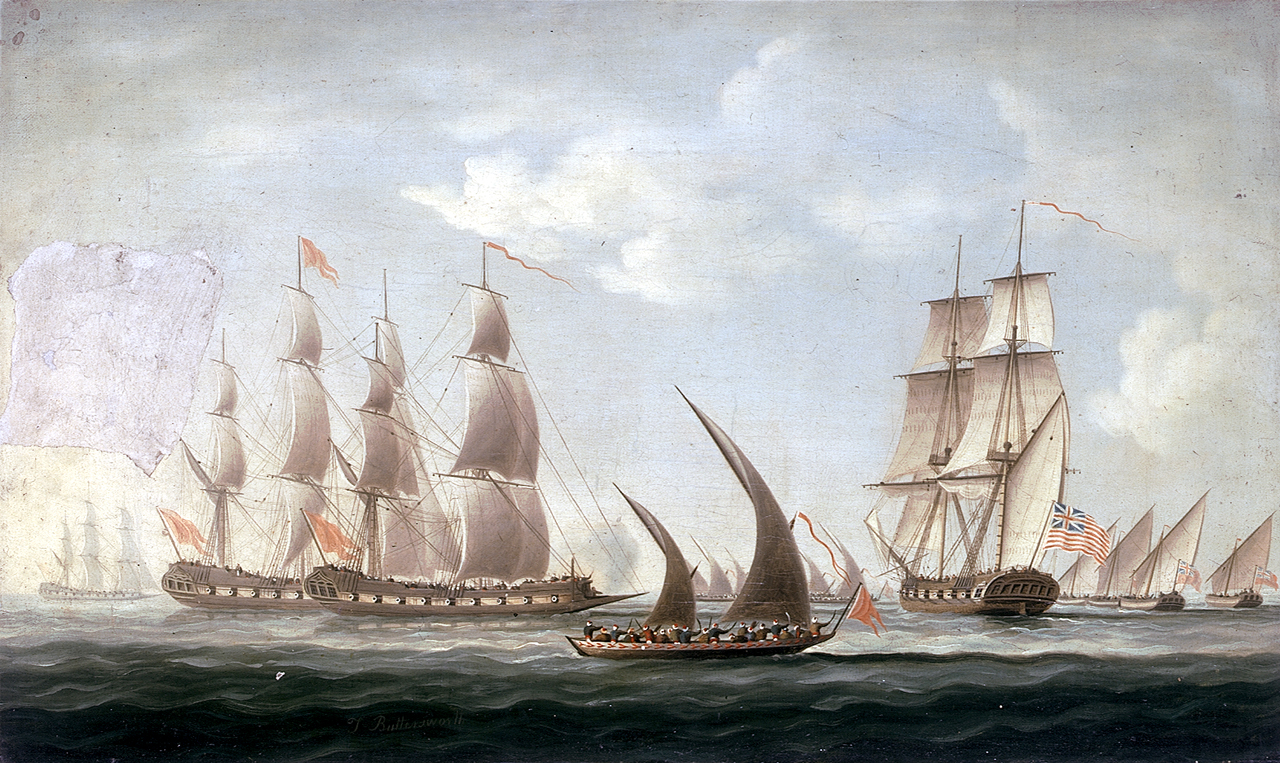
A Maratha Navy gallivat (centre) attacking Aurora in 1816

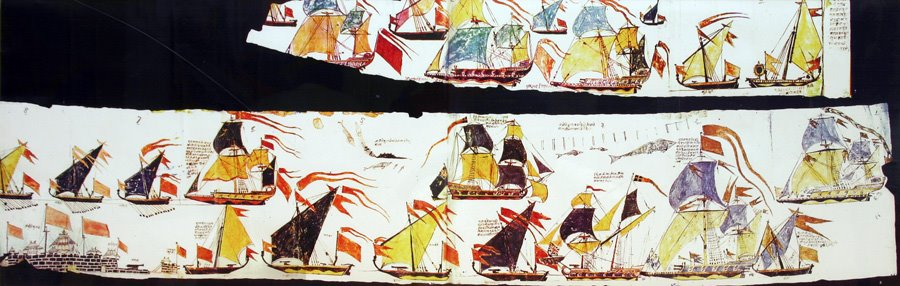
A painted scroll depicting gallivats, grabs and other vessels of the Maratha Navy, including some captured British ships

The gallivat (or galivat, or gallevat, or gallowet, or gallouet) was a small, armed boat, with sails and oars, used on the Malabar Coast in the 18th and 19th centuries. The word may derive from Portuguese "galeota" or alternatively, from the Maratha "gal hat" ship. Hobson-Jobson has an extensive discussion of the origins of the term and its usage.

The gallivat typically had one or two masts with a lateen sail, and some 20 benches for oarsmen, one on each side. They were generally under 70 tons (bm) in size, and had a prow much like that of a grab.

One of the ablest admirals of the 18th Century Maratha Navy, Kanhoji Angre (a.k.a. Angria), made great use of gallivats. Generally, each of his grabs would have an attendant gallivat, both to tow it in calms and to carry extra men.

On December 27, 1735 Angre attacked the East Indiaman Derby off Suvarnadurg. He deployed nine galleys, five grabs, and fifteen gallivats. Derby eventually struck her colours after having seven men killed and five wounded. Angre kept the surviving crew prisoners for 11 months until the Governor of Bombay ransomed them.

In 1754, a listing of Sidhi vessels seized by the EIC and held at Surat in 1759 gives the names of seven gallivats. The largest, Manzul, had a length of 44 feet, a breadth of 17 feet, and a hold depth of 4 feet. The length and breadth measurements translate into a burthen (bm) of 52 ton. The smallest gallivat, Ram Chand, had a length of 29 feet, a breadth, of 13 feet, a hold depth of 4 feet, yielding a burthen of 19 tons.

A gallivat that the EIC captured in 1775 measured 84 feet in length, and 24 feet in breadth, which yields a burthen of 213 tons. She had a single, forward-raked mast, and 24 oars, and carried ten 6-pounder guns. This would seem to be at the upper end of the size for a galivat, and represent a vessel more in the range of sizes for a grab.

== Gallivats of the Bombay Marine ==
The British East India Company made some use of gallivats, particularly for the Bombay Marine, which was the British East India Company's (EIC) navy.

=== 1754 ===
Name	Tons (bm)	Complement	Armament
Shark	38	48	1 × 3-pounder + 6 × 2-pounder guns
Dolphin	37	48	1 × 3-pounder + 6 × 2-pounder guns
Swift	15	27	1 × 1-pounder + 4 × ½-pounder guns
2 new and 5 planned	20	31	1 × 2-pounder + 4 × 1-pounder guns

The largest gallivat, Shark(e), had a crew of six Europeans, six "Christian topasses", 20 lascars, and 16 soldiers. The smallest gallivat, Swift, had a crew of two Europeans, 14 lascars, and 11 soldiers. Her smallest guns (½-pounders) were possibly swivel guns. The soldiers were frequently from the Bombay Marine Battalion. (Note: For an example of the service of sepoys of the Marine Battalion see: HCS Aurora.)

In 1759, the Bombay Marine had 13 gallivats, six at Bombay and seven at Surat. (Note: The six at Bombay were: Dolphin, Sharke, Tyger, Munsury, Yacobkhany, and Swift. The seven at Surat were: Squirrel, Kaither Bux, Nasary, Lively's Prize, Kaither Madut, Munsury, Fly, and Swallow.) Each had a crew consisting of two Europeans, some two to six Christian topasses (Luso-Asians), and 14 to 20 lascars. They carried from five to seven guns of various sizes.

=== 1766 ===
Name	Armament
Fly	1 × 2-pounder + 4 × 1-pounder guns
Wolf	8 × 3-pounder guns
Beagle	8 × 3-pounder guns
Passard	1 × 6-pounder + 4 × 4-pounder guns
Swift	1 × 4-pounder + 4 × 1-pounder guns

In 1773 the Bombay Dockyard built Hawke, a gallivat, for the Bengal Pilot service. By 1802 the Bombay Marine had no gallivats in service.
