= Koll Rock =

- Location within Antarctica

Geography
- Location: Antarctica
- Coordinates: 67°24′S 60°41′E

Administration
- Administered under the Antarctic Treaty System

Demographics
- Population: Uninhabited

Koll Rock, also known as Blake Island, is a large rock located 1 kilometre (0.5 nmi) southeast of Oom Island in the west side of Oom Bay, Mac. Robertson Land, Antarctica. It was mapped by Norwegian cartographers from air photos taken by the Lars Christensen Expedition, 1936–37, and named Kollskjer (knoll rock).
