= Bhaskargad =

Hill fort in Maharashtra, India

Bhaskargad Fort, Basgad
- Nashik district, Maharashtra
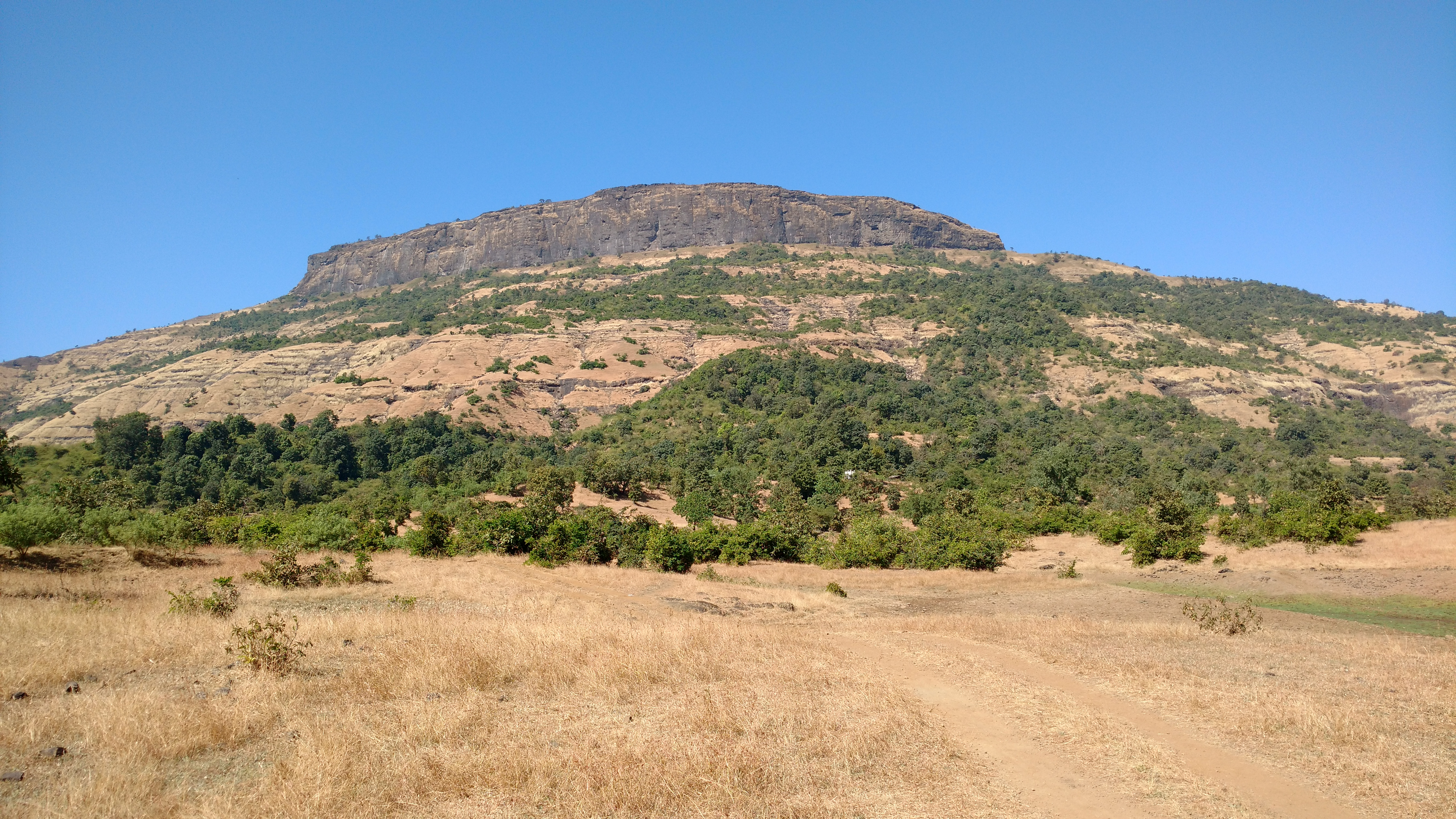
- Bhaskargad fort from Village Dahalewadi

Site information
- Type: Hill fort
- Owner: VIK local authority
- Open to the public: Yes
- Condition: Ruins

Location
- Shown within Maharashtra
- Coordinates: 19°54′14.3″N 73°25′50.4″E
- Height: 3500 ft

Site history
- Materials: Stone

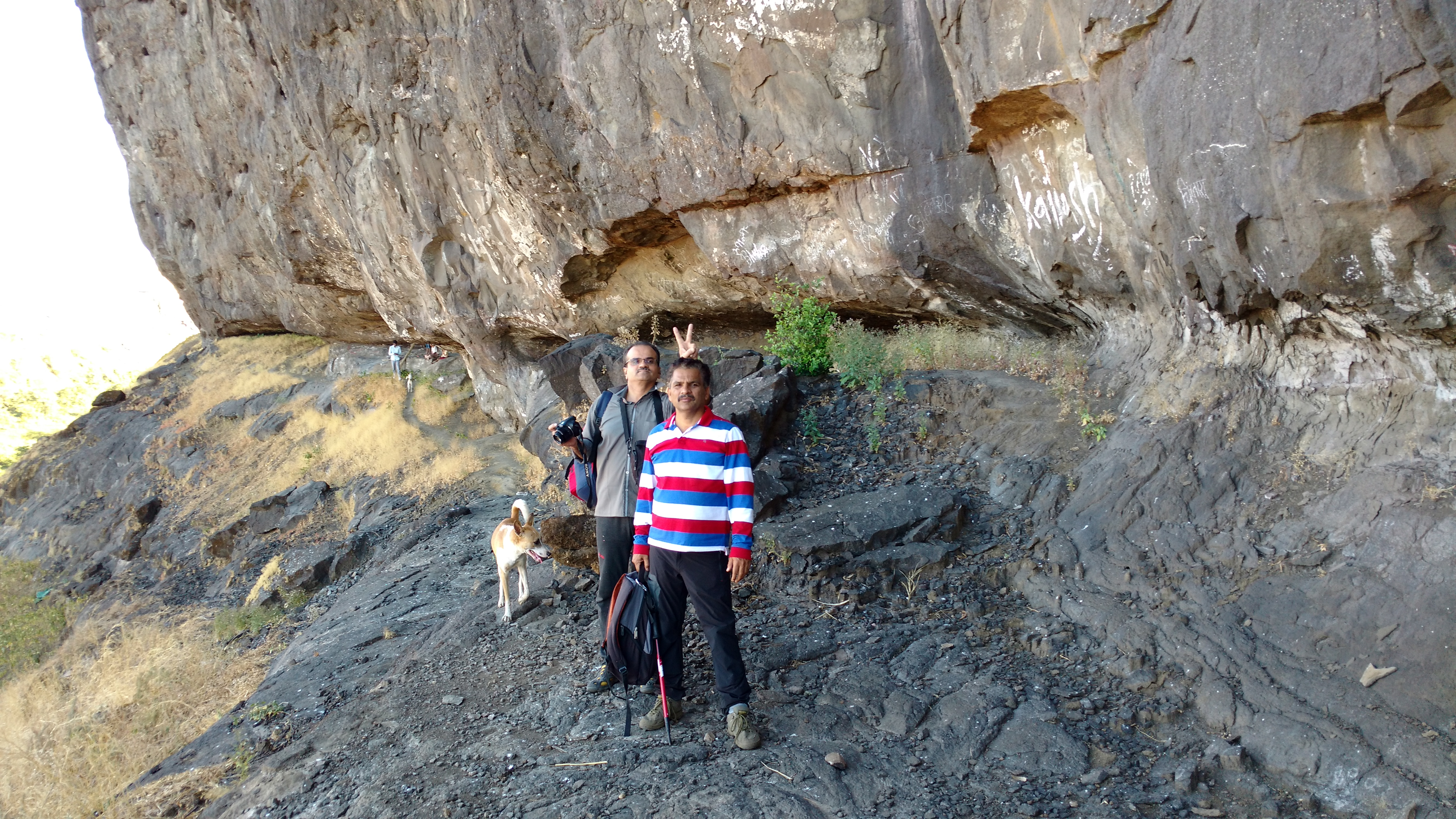
Traversing the scarp

Bhaskargad Fort, alternatively known as Basgad Fort, is a hill fort situated within the Nashik district of Maharashtra, India. Part of the Trimbak hill range, it lies in proximity to Harihar Fort. Located approximately 48 kilometers away from Igatpuri, Bhaskargad Fort is recognized as a favored site for activities such as trekking and hiking."

== History ==
This fort was built during the period of Yadava (kshtriya) of Devgiri in the 13th century. It was under the control of Yadavas from 1279 to 1308. It was later under the control of the Bahmani Kingdom followed by Ahmadnagar Sultanate, and the Mughal Empire. In 1629, Shahaji revolted against the Mohammed Adil Shah of Bijapur and the fort was captured by him. This fort was again captured by Adil Shah after the surrender of Shahaji at Mahuli Fort. The fort was under Mughal Empire in 1633. in 1670 the chieftain of King Shivaji, Moropant Trimbak Pingle, won the fort from Mughals. In 1688 the fort was again captured by Mughals. The Koli tribal revolted in 1730 and captured the fort. The fort was under the control of Peshwas until 1818 when Captain Briggs of the East India Company captured it.

== Location ==
There are two routes to reach the base village of Dahalepada. One route is from Khodala and the other from Igatpuri. The nearest town is Igatpuri, which is 48 km from Nashik and 121 km from Mumbai. There are hotels at both Igatpuri and Ghoti.

The trekking path starts from the hillock south of Dahalepada. The route is very safe and wide. The trekking route passes through the scrub forest until it reaches an open ridge that is connected to the fort. It takes about an hour to reach the scarp of the hill on which the fort is situated. The route then takes a long traverse behind the hillock. There are many overhangs on the scarp. The traverse is very safe and passes through Karvi shrubs until it reaches the rock-cut steps.

The climb on the steps is very easy. The parent rock is cut in a helical shape, and the steps are carved out of it. Half of the path is now covered with boulders and stones. It takes about 15 minutes to reach the top of the fort.

Night stay on the fort is not possible since there is no water and no accommodation facility. It is advised to carry enough water for this trek since there is no water on the route or on the fort.

== Architectural Features ==
There is one main gate on the main entrance path of the fort. The main entrance gate and the rock-hewn steps are carved from the same rock. There is a rock-hewn water cistern on the fort. There is a crude idol of Veer Maruti on the fort. It takes about thirty minutes to visit all places on the fort.

== Gallery ==
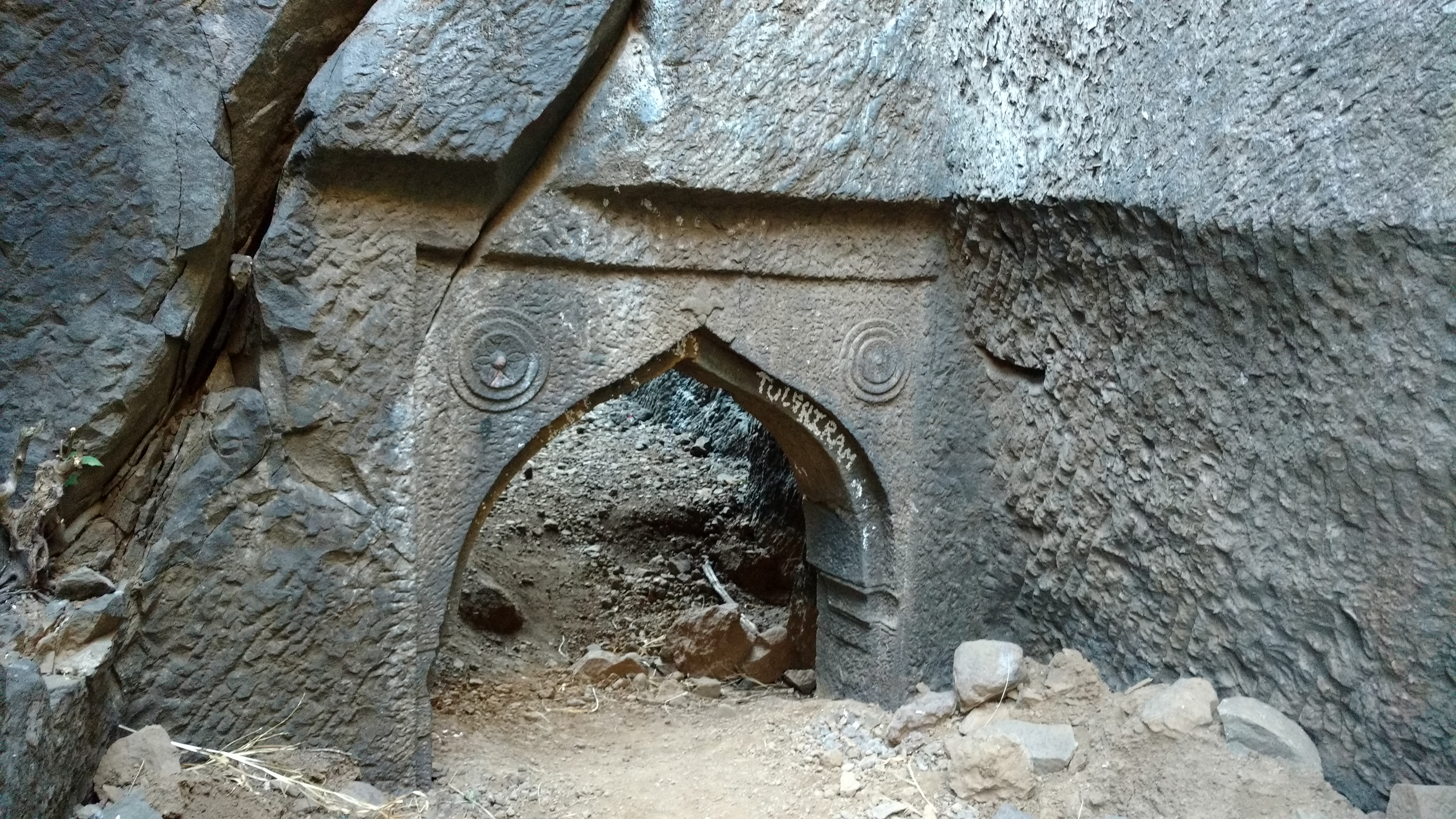
Main entrance gate

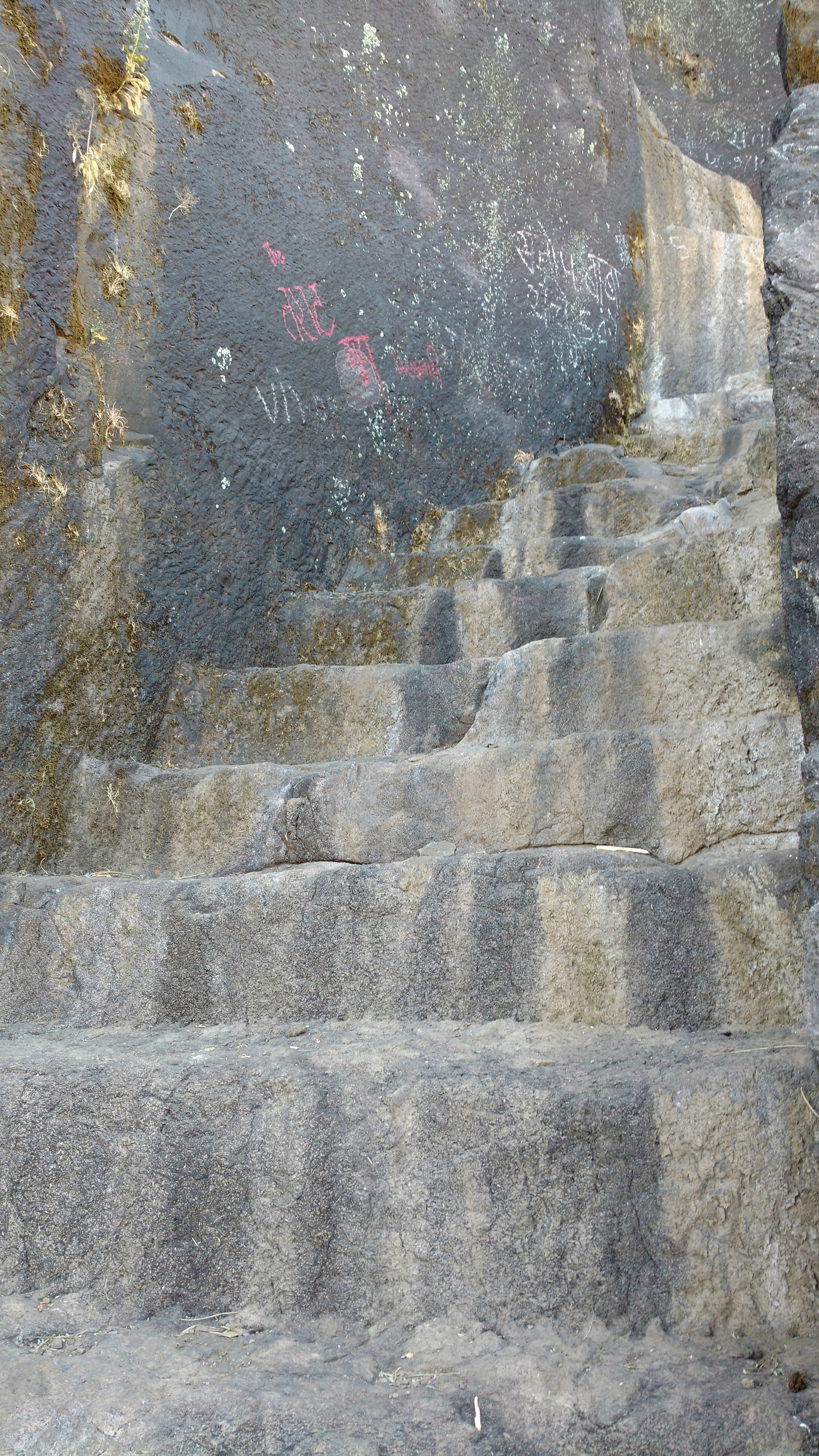
Rock cut steps

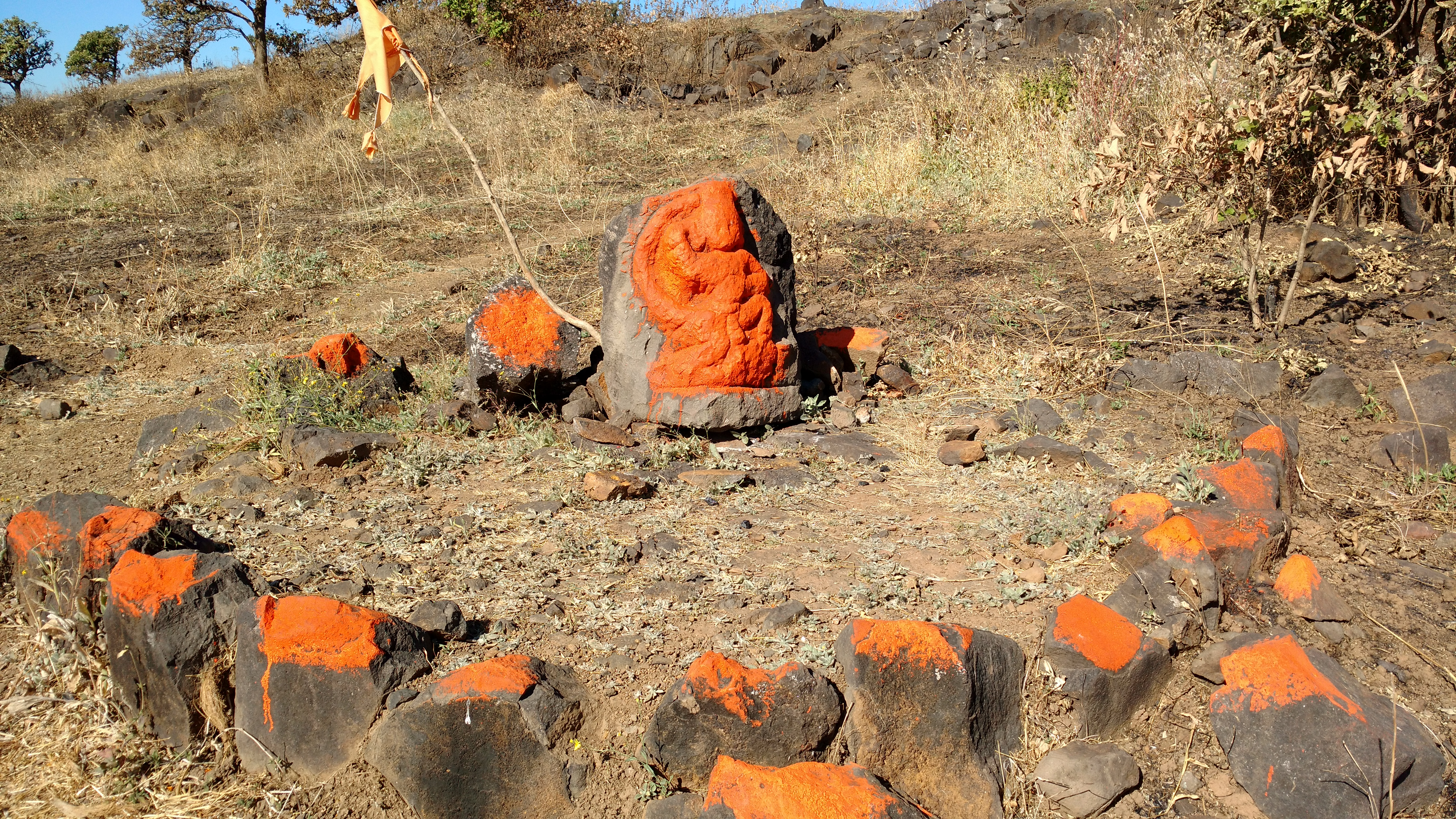
Veer maruti

== See also ==
- List of forts in Maharashtra
- List of forts in India
