= Koli-ye Olya =

Koli-ye Olya or Kali-ye Olya (Persian: كلي عليا) may refer to:

- Koli-ye Olya, Ardabil
- Kali-ye Olya, East Azerbaijan
