= Koli-ye Sofla =

Koli-ye Sofla or Kali-ye Sofla (Persian: كلي سفلي) may refer to:

- Koli-ye Sofla, Ardabil
- Kali-ye Sofla, East Azerbaijan
