= Kol language =

Kol language may refer to:

- Kol language (Bangladesh), a Munda (Austroasiatic) language of Bangladesh
- Kol language (Cameroon), a Bantu language of Cameroon
- Kol language (Papua New Guinea), a language isolate of Papua New Guinea
- Aka-Kol, sometimes just Kol, a Great Andamanese language of India
- Kol, a dialect of Cua language (Austroasiatic), a Mon-Khmer (Austroasiatic) language of Vietnam

== See also ==
- Kol (disambiguation)
- Munda languages (historically Kolarian languages), a subfamily of the Austroasiatic languages
  - Ho language, a Munda language spoken by the Kol tribal communities of India
