= Kali-ye Sofla, East Azerbaijan =

Kali-ye Sofla كلي سفلي
- Village
- Location within Iran
- Coordinates: 38°52′44″N 47°15′31″E
- Country: Iran
- Province: East Azerbaijan
- County: Ahar
- Bakhsh: Hurand
- Rural District: Dodangeh

Population (2006)
  - Total: 167
- Time zone: UTC+3:30 (IRST)
  - Summer (DST): UTC+4:30 (IRDT)

Kali-ye Sofla (Persian: كلي سفلي, also Romanized as Kalī-ye Soflá; also known as Kalī-ye Pā‘īn) is a village in Dodangeh Rural District, Hurand District, Ahar County, East Azerbaijan Province, Iran. At the 2006 census, its population was 167, in 33 families.
