= Oom Island =

Island off the coast of Antarctica

- Location within Antarctica

Geography
- Location: Antarctica
- Coordinates: 67°24′S 60°39′E

Administration
- Administered under the Antarctic Treaty System

Demographics
- Population: Uninhabited

According to the Australian Antarctic Data Centre, Oom Island is "a small island 0.93 kilometres (0.5 nmi) northeast of Campbell Head, off the coast of Mac. Robertson Land. Mapped by Norwegian cartographers from air photos taken by the Lars Christensen Expedition, 1936–37, and named Uksoy. Renamed by Antarctic Names Committee of Australia (ANCA) for Lieutenant K. E. Oom, RAN, a member of the British Australian New Zealand Antarctic Research Expedition (BANZARE), 1929–31."

== See also ==
- List of Antarctic and sub-Antarctic islands
