= Maratha Navy =

Combined naval force of Maratha Empire

- Flag of the Maratha Empire
- Active: 1654–1818
- Country: Maratha Empire
- Type: Navy
- Role: Naval warfare

Commanders
- Sarkhel (Admiral of the Mahratta Fleet): Supreme commander
- Notable commanders: Admiral Maynak Bhandari (active between 1654–1679); Admiral Kanhoji Angre (active between 1698–1729); Admiral Yesaji Angre (active between (1729-1734); Admiral Tulaji Angre (active between 1743-1754); Admiral Anandrao Dhulap (active between 1764–1795); Fleet chief, Laya Sarpatil

The Maratha Navy was the maritime component of the military forces of the Maratha Empire, active along the western coast of India from the mid-17th to early 19th century. It was established under the leadership of Chhatrapati Shivaji, first Chhatrapati of the Maratha Empire, in the 1650s to protect coastal trade routes and counter regional and European naval powers, including the Portuguese, the English East India Company, and the Siddis of Janjira.

Under commanders such as Admiral Kanhoji Angre, the navy expanded its influence, using small, maneuverable vessels like gallivats and grabs, and employing tactics adapted to coastal and shallow-water conditions. While primarily a coastal or "green-water" force, it played a significant role in challenging colonial shipping and asserting Maratha interests in maritime trade.

The navy’s effectiveness declined in the late 18th century due to internal rivalries, changing political dynamics, and the growing dominance of the British Royal Navy. It was ultimately dismantled following the Anglo-Maratha Wars.

== Formative years ==
Historian Sir Jadunath Sarkar noted:

Nothing proves Chhatrapati Shivaji Maharaj's genius as a born statesman more clearly than his creation of a navy and naval bases.

In early Modern India, significant Muslim powers such as the Mughal Empire had paid less attention to building the naval arm of their military forces. This scenario changed, however, when the Portuguese arrived in India and started monopolizing and controlling trade on the western coast of the continent. Shivaji realized the importance of a strong navy and commissioned the building of the first Maratha naval vessel in a creek near Kalyan around 1654. He did this to mainly check the power of the Siddis of Janjira.

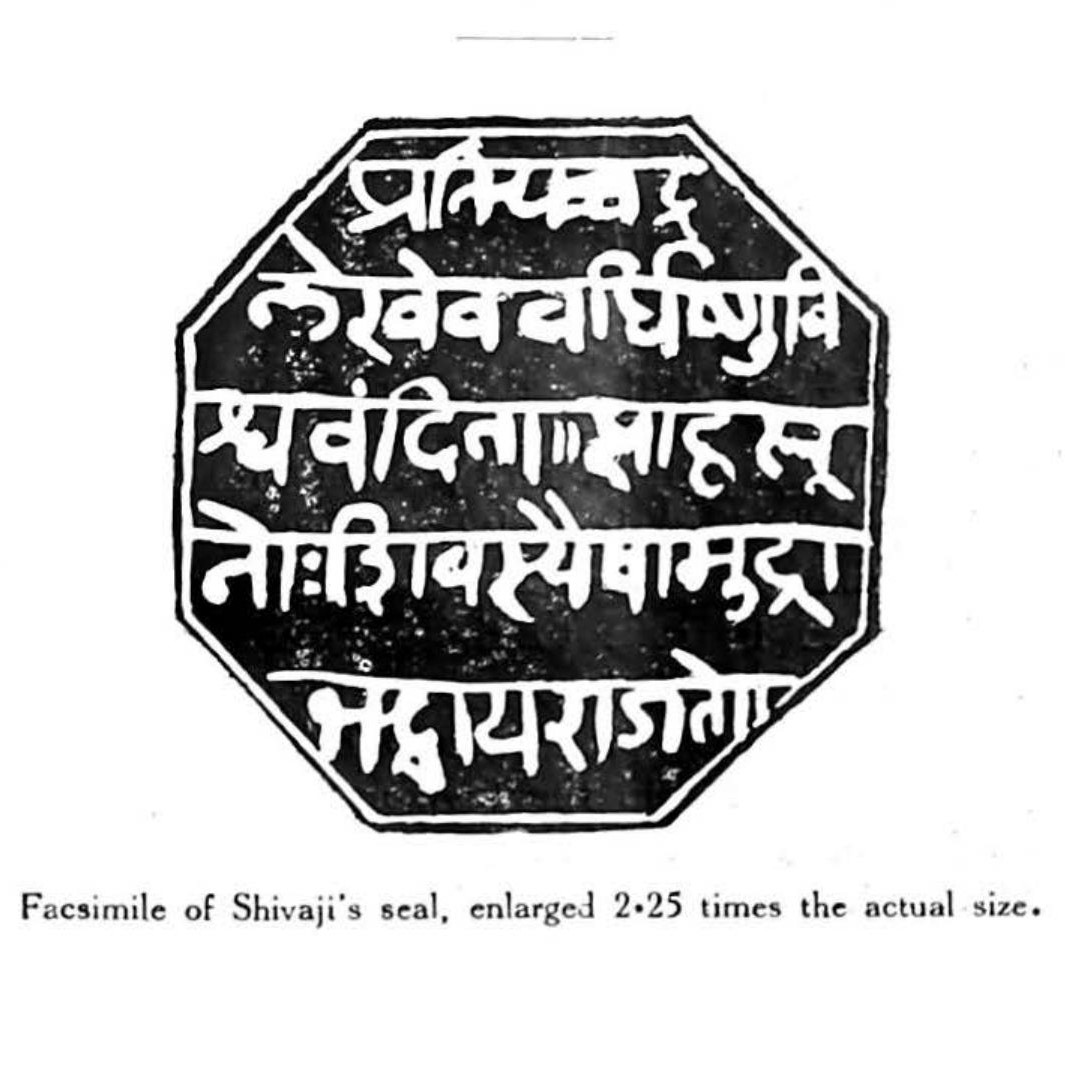
Royal Seal of Chhatrapati Shivaji

Shivaji took up the task of constructing multiple naval bases along the coast of present-day Maharashtra. He organized two fleets, one under the command of Admiral Maynak Bhandari and the other under Daulat Khan. The Maratha Navy consisted mostly of native Konkani sailors; however, it was commanded mostly by mercenaries, including Siddi and Portuguese. Circa 1659, the Maratha Navy consisted of around 20 warships. Hiring mercenaries was relatively common in Maratha military culture and the Navy was no exception to this practice. The Portuguese naval officer Rui Leitão Viegas was hired as fleet commander, in part because the Maratha wanted to get insight into the Portuguese naval technology and capabilities. The Maratha knew the Portuguese had a powerful navy. The Portuguese convinced their mercenary officers to leave the service of the Maratha; however, the Portuguese allied with the Marathas when the latter went to war against the Mughals.

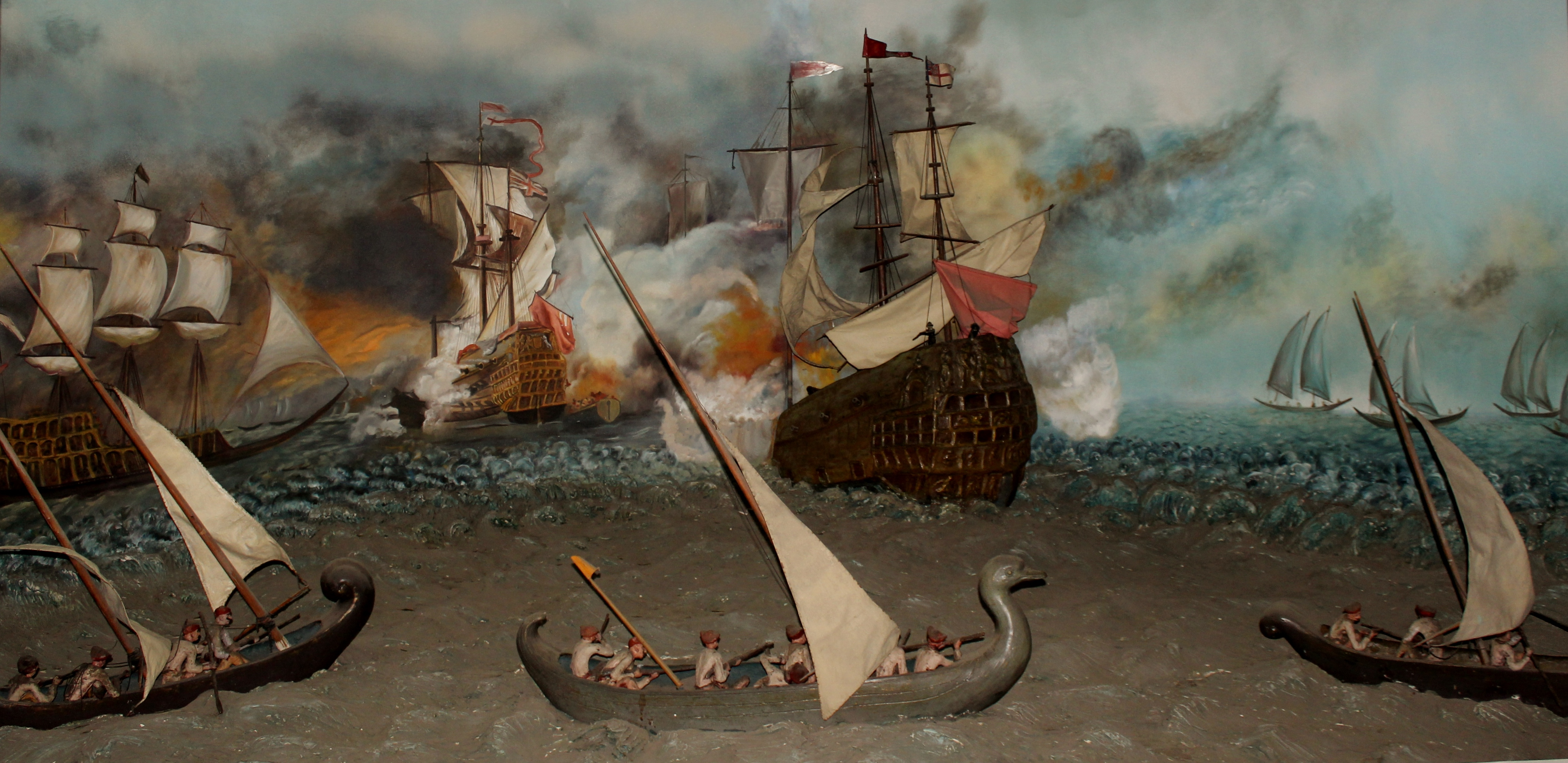
A diorama showing Maratha naval tactics, on display at the National Museum, New Delhi

In 1679, Shivaji annexed the island of Khanderi, which was 11 miles (18 km) off the entrance to Mumbai. In response the English and the Siddi repeatedly attacked the island, but they were unable to oust the Maratha from the islands.

In 1674, the year of Shivaji's coronation, the Portuguese at Goa acknowledged the Maratha naval power and sent their emissary to Shivaji with gifts; they signed a treaty of friendship. Around this time, the Maratha Navy's strength was around 5,000 men and 57 warships. During its expedition to Karwar (present-day Karnataka), the navy possessed around 85 assorted Gallivats (warboat) ranging from 30 to 150 tons and 3 three-masted Gurabs/Grabs (warship).

== Under Sambhaji ==
The Maratha Navy fought many battles during Sambhaji Maharaj's reign from 1680 to 1689. Maynak Bhandari, Darya sarang and Daulat Khan were the admirals of the Maratha Navy in Sambhaji's reign.

The Siddis of Janjira formed an alliance with Aurangzeb and started to raid Maratha villages in Konkan in 1681. Aurangzeb had planned to blockade Sambhaji's territories from all sides and raids by the Siddis was part of that strategy. On his part, Sambhaji wanted to capture the strategically important fort of Janjira to dominate trade in the Arabian Sea.In late 1681, Sambhaji launched an amphibious siege on Janjira with 20,000 soldiers from the army and navy, commanding the force personally. Sambhaji planned to win the fort by deceiving Siddi. He sent a party led by senior Maratha Commander Kondaji Farzand to Siddi under the pretext of a fake quarrel with him.

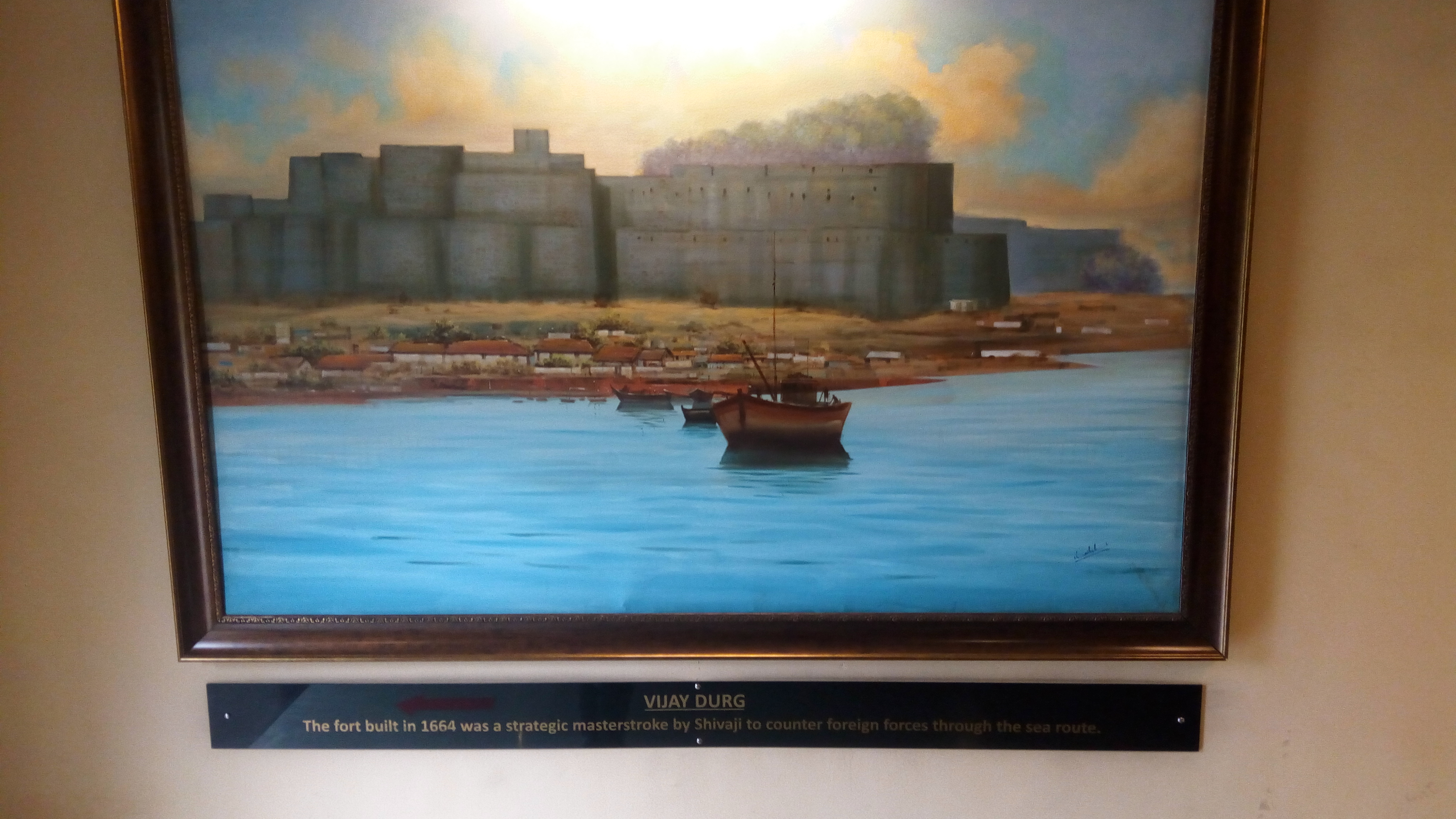
A painting of Vijaydurg sea fortress (built in the 17th century). The painting is in the National War Museum, Pune

The Mughal sardars Rahullakhan and Ranmastakhan had captured Kalyan and Bhiwandi in the year 1682. They destroyed the Durgadi fort near Kalyan. Sambhaji immediately wanted to capture the cities back and arrived in the region quickly. He immediately ordered the construction of Parsik fort on the Parsik Hill overlooking the Thane Creek as the Portuguese ships were using the Thane Creek to supply the enemies. Sambhaji Maharaj ordered his forces at Parsik to bombard any Portuguese supply ships crossing the Thane Creek. Sambhaji Maharaj later on defeated Rahullakhan and Ranmastakhan in the Battle of Kalyan and recaptured Kalyan and Bhiwandi. He immediately ordered repairs of the Durgadi fort at Kalyan. Kalyan was an important naval base for the Marathas.

The Maratha Navy reportedly raided Bharuch, an important trading center in Gujarat in 1687.

Some claim that Sambhaji purchased Elephanta island to check the influence of the English East India Company (EIC) near Bombay. But Sambhaji did not purchase Elephanta Island to check the influence of the English East India Company. Elephanta Island was under Portuguese control before it was ceded to the British as part of Catherine of Braganza's dowry when she married Charles II in 1661. The English East India Company did not acquire Elephanta Island through purchase, but rather through a lease from the British crown. The EIC's influence near Bombay grew as they leased the island of Bombay itself from the crown.

Sambhaji Maharaj wanted to modernize the Maratha Navy. Hence he allied with the Arab naval commander Jange Khan. Sambhaji Maharaj invited him to Konkan to train the Maratha Navy in quick ship building and usage of artillery. Jange Khan accepted the offer and stayed with his troops in Konkan for six months in 1681. His men trained the Maratha Navy in various aspects of shipbuilding and artillery usage.

Sambhaji Maharaj was captured, tortured and then executed by Mughal forces under Aurangzeb in the year 1689. In his nine year reign the Maratha Navy had increased in size. He continued Shivaji Maharaj's policies to strengthen the navy. During his reign the Maratha Navy firmly held the control of coastline from Tarapur In North Konkan to Karwar in North Karnataka barring the regions of Mumbai, Janjira and Goa. He was well aware of importance of naval warfare and navy.

== Under Admiral Kanhoji Angre ==
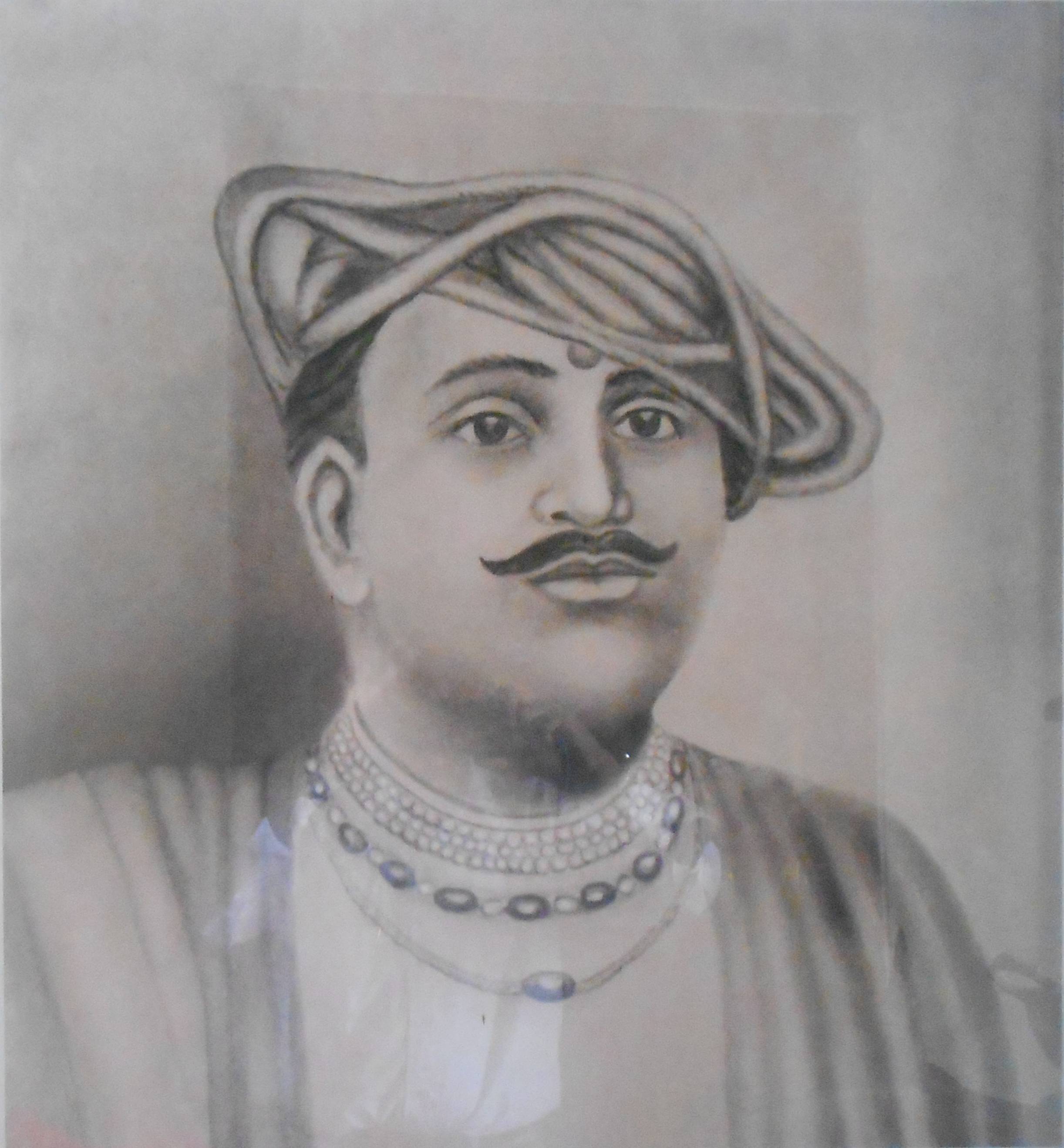
A portrait of Admiral Kanhoji Angre

After the death of Admiral Sidhoji Gujar around 1698, the Maratha Navy survived because of the extensive efforts of Koli Admiral Kanhoji Angre. Under his leadership, the influence of European trading companies was checked along the western coast of India. Kanhoji owed allegiance to the supreme Maratha king Chhatrapati Shahu and his prime minister Peshwa Balaji Vishwanath. He gained their support to develop naval facilities on the western coast of India, or Konkan. Under the leadership of Kanhoji, the Maratha developed a naval base at Vijayadurg featuring dockyard facilities for building vessels, mounting guns, and making the ships sea-worthy. Their naval fleet consisted of ten gurabs/grabs (warship) and fifty gallivats (warboat). A gallivat had a displacement lower than 120 tons, while a grab could go as high as 400 tons.

Another ship type used was the Pal (Maratha Man-of-war), which was a cannon-armed, three-masted vessel. The grabs had broadsides of 6- and 9-pounder guns, and carried two 9- or 12-pounders on their main decks. These guns pointed forward through port-holes cut in the bulkheads. The gallivats were mostly armed with light swivel guns, but some also mounted six or eight cannons, either 2- or 4-pounders. These boats were propelled by forty to fifty oars. Even during the reign of Kanhoji Angre, the Maratha Government signed a treaty of friendship with the Portuguese in 1703. As per the treaty, the Portuguese agreed to supply cannon and gunpowder to the Maratha, supplies which they needed as they had only a few cannon foundries producing their own armaments. The Marathas signed a treaty with the Siddi as well, thus concentrating all their forces against the English East India Company.

By the beginning of the 18th century, Kanhoji Angre controlled the entire coastline from Sawantwadi to Mumbai, which is the entire coastline of present-day Maharashtra. He built fortifications on almost all creeks, cove, and harbours, such as a fortress or citadel with navigational facilities. Any ship sailing through Maratha territorial waters was to pay a levy called Chouth, which expressed Angre's dominance. Between 1717 and 1720, the EIC made at least two attempts to defeat the Maratha Navy, but were unsuccessful. In response to a EIC ship being captured by Kanhoji's seamen, the British attempted to capture Vijayadurg and Khanderi, but these attempts were unsuccessful.

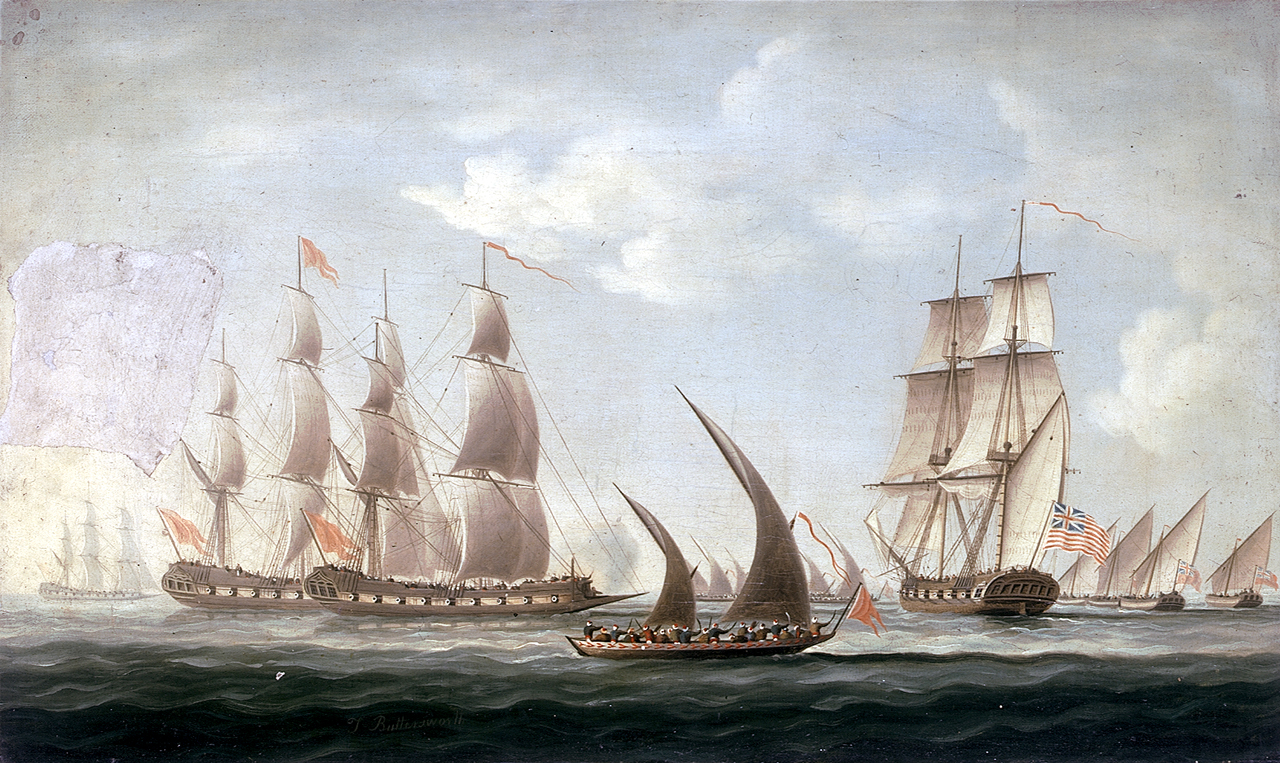
"Mahratta Grabs and Gallivats attacking the sloop Aurora of the Bombay Marine." by Thomas Buttersworth c.1812

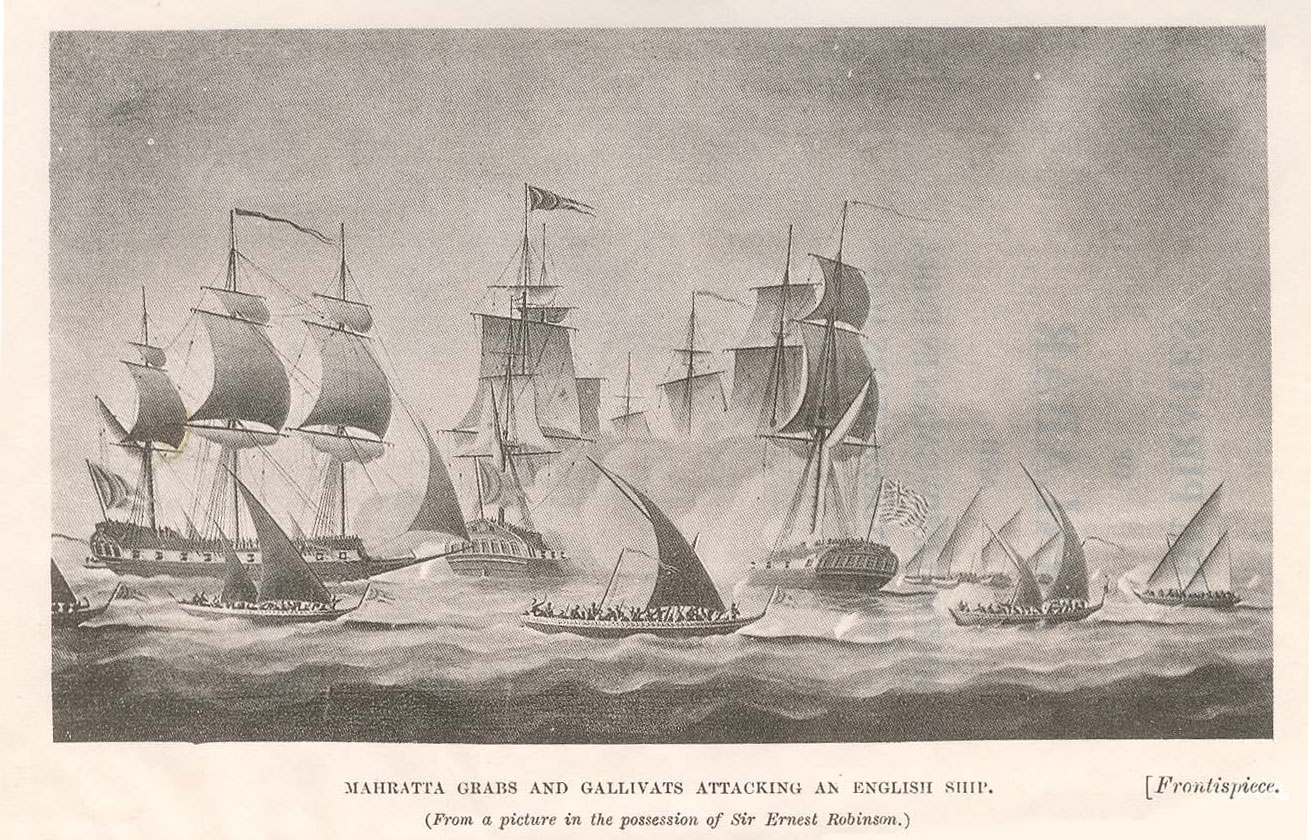
Maratha Grabs and Gallivats attacking an English-Ship

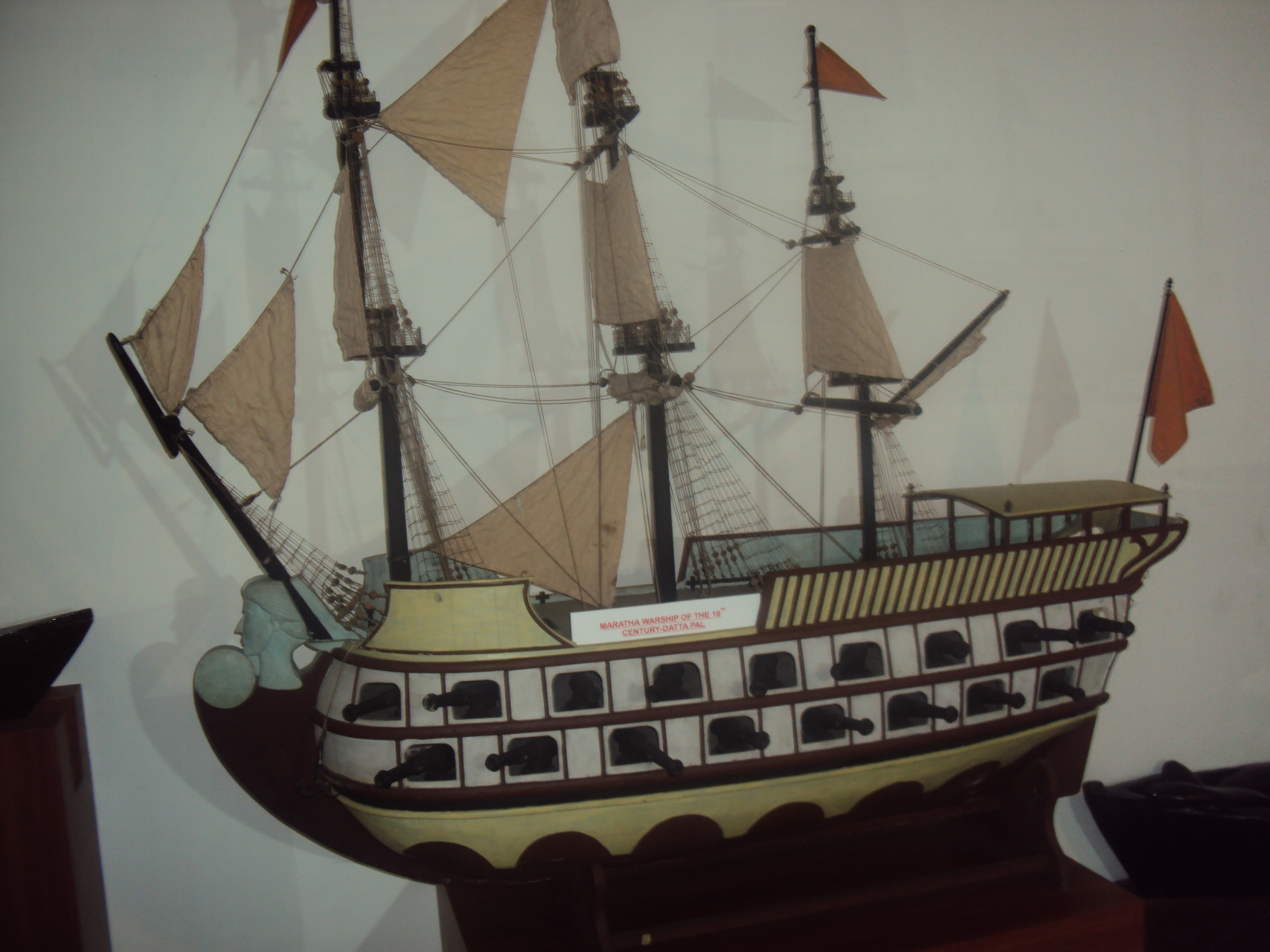
model of a Pal, one of the largest Maratha Ships.

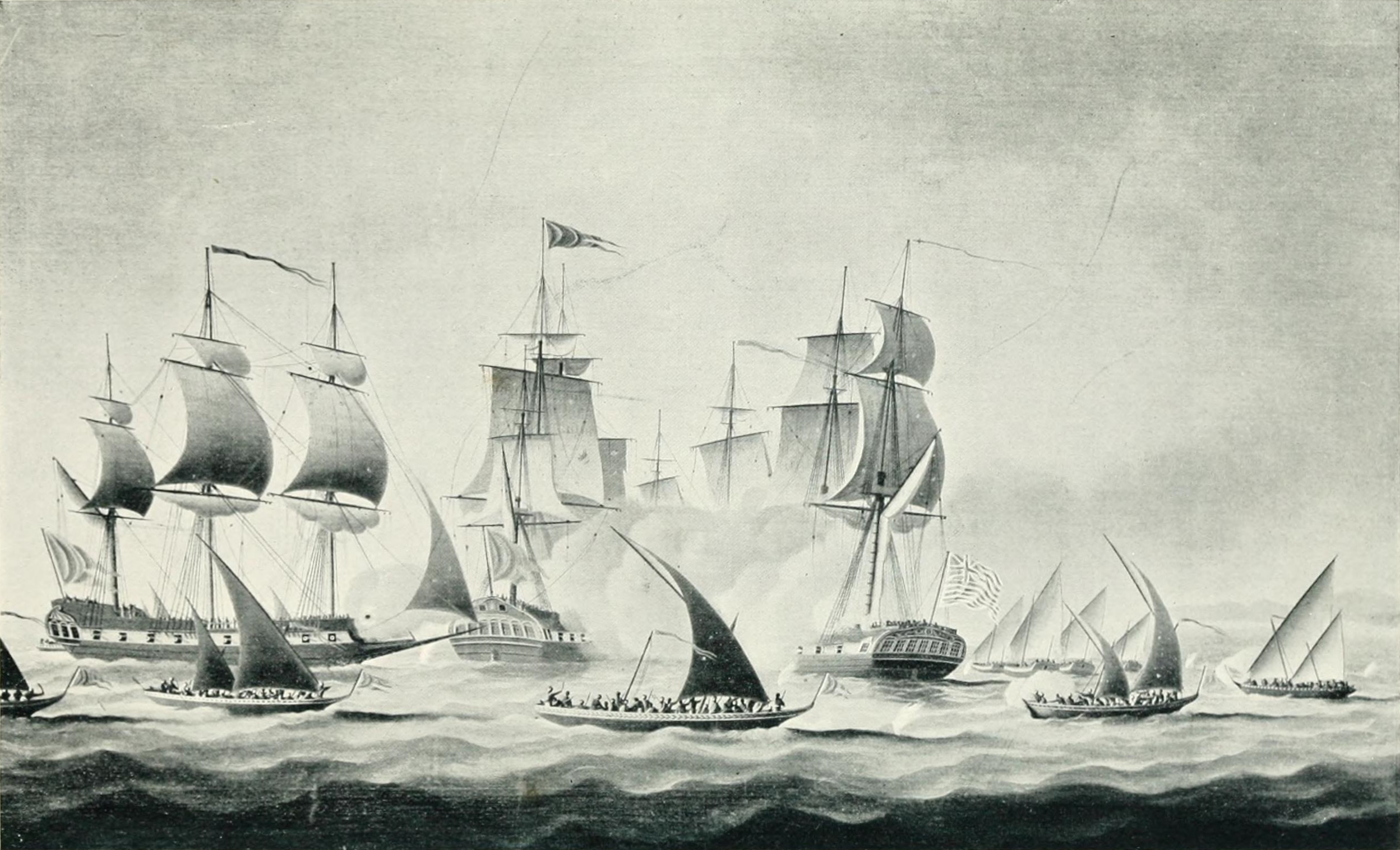
Capture of the Ranger by Maratha Ships. C.1783

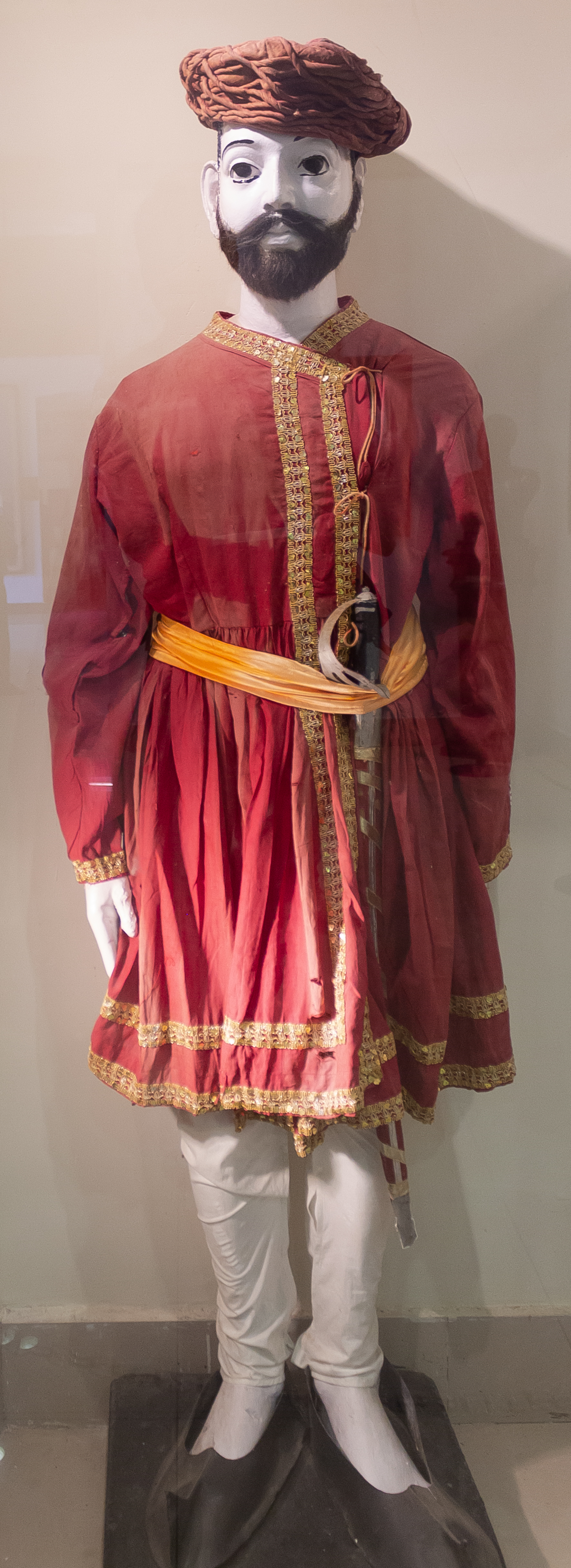
Sculpture depicting a Maratha Sailor

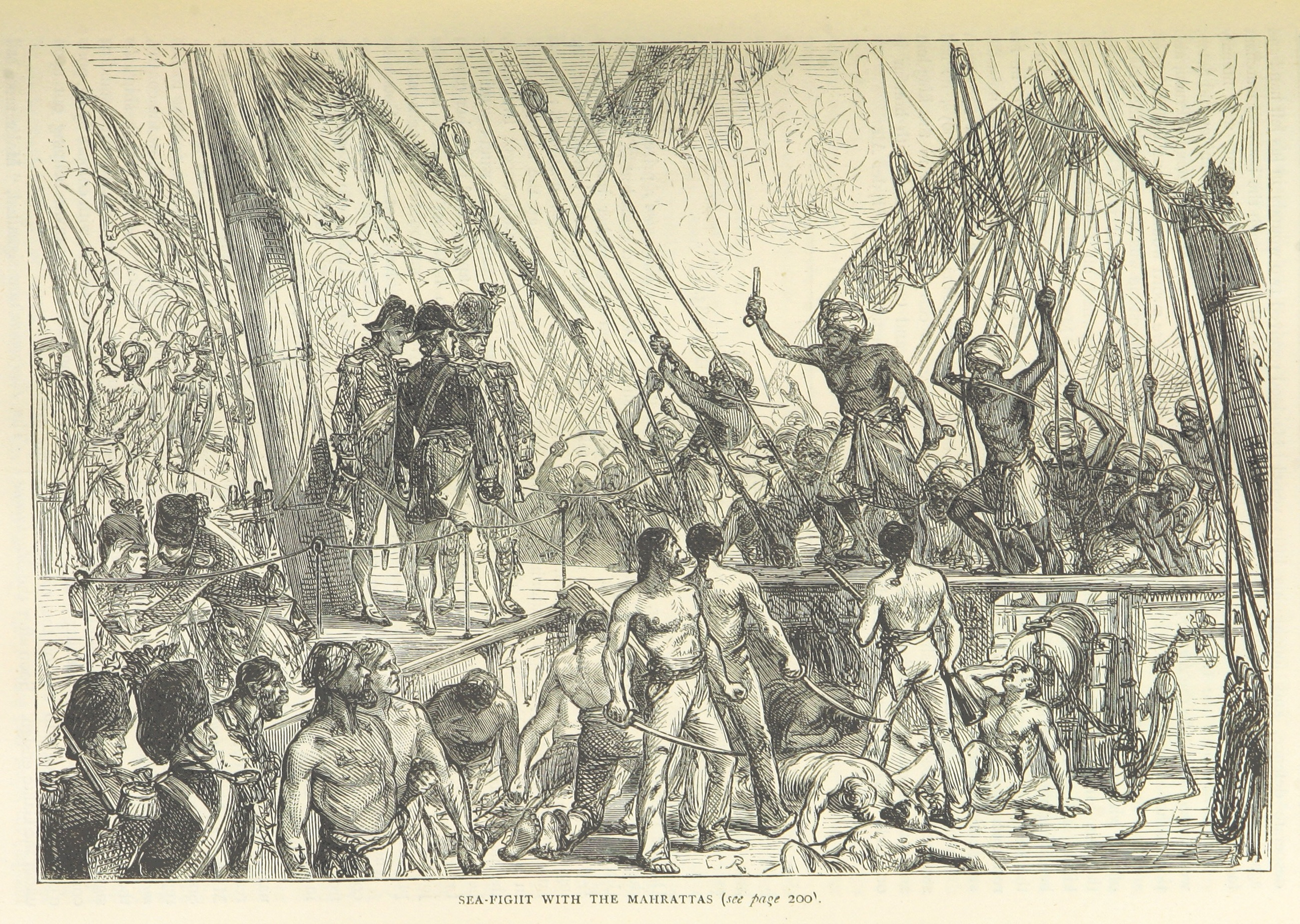
A fight between Maratha and East India Company sailors

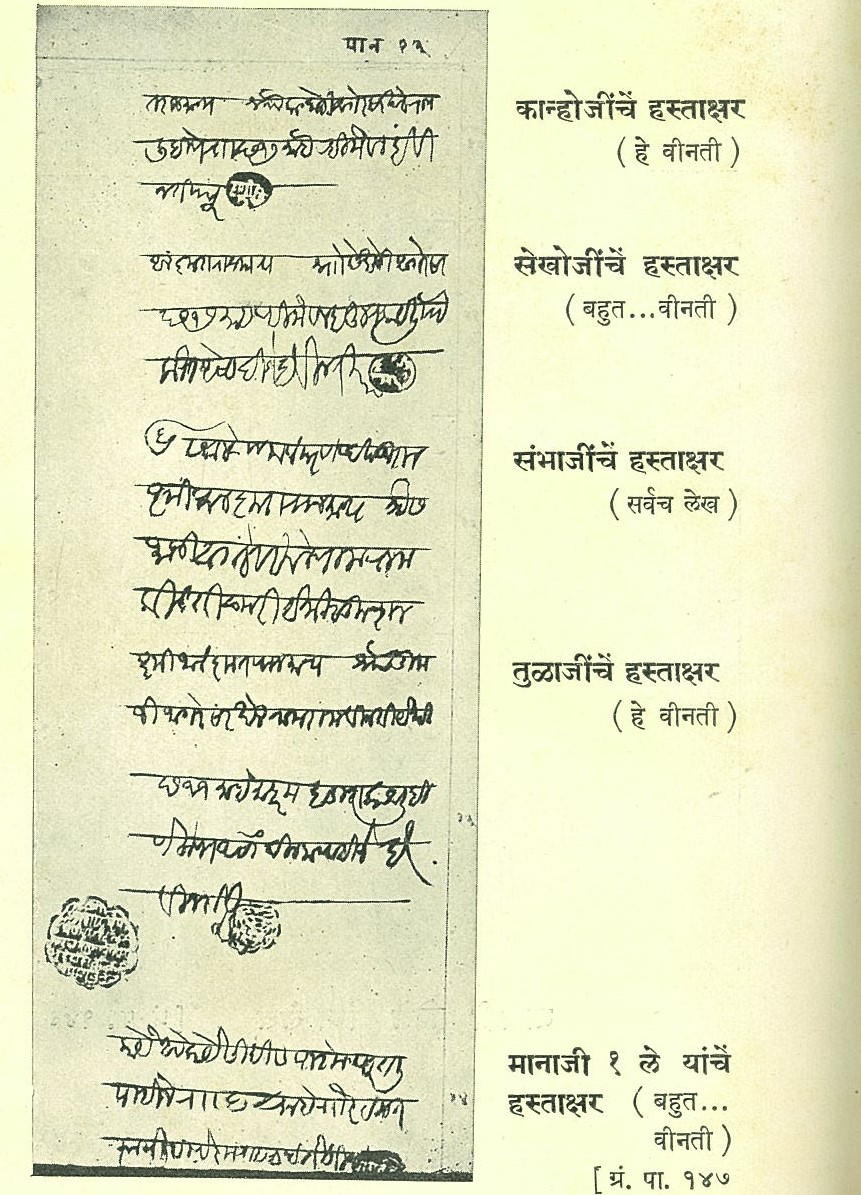
Handwriting of the Angres, a predominant Maratha era naval family.

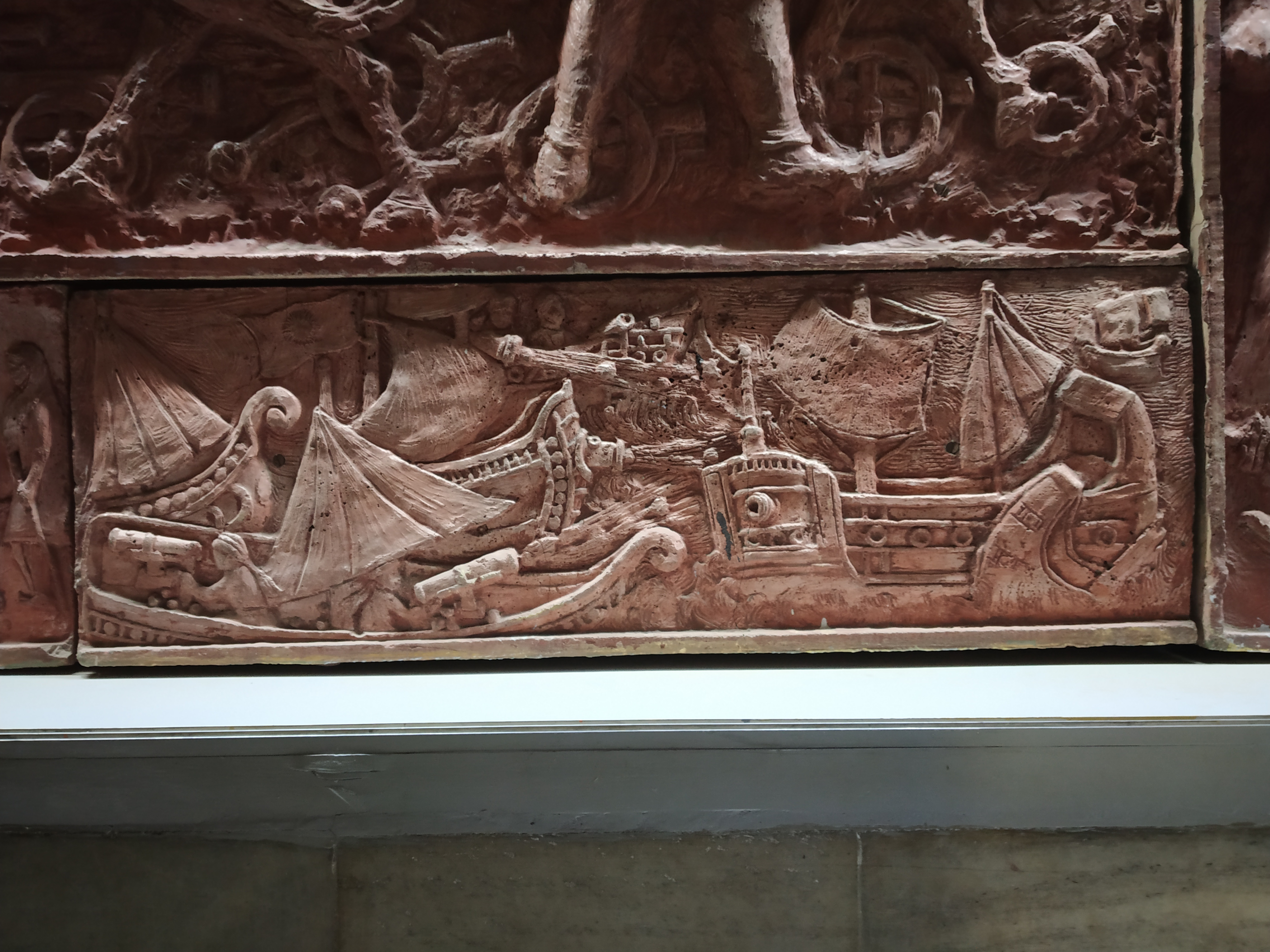
Sculpture depicting the Peshwa's Navy

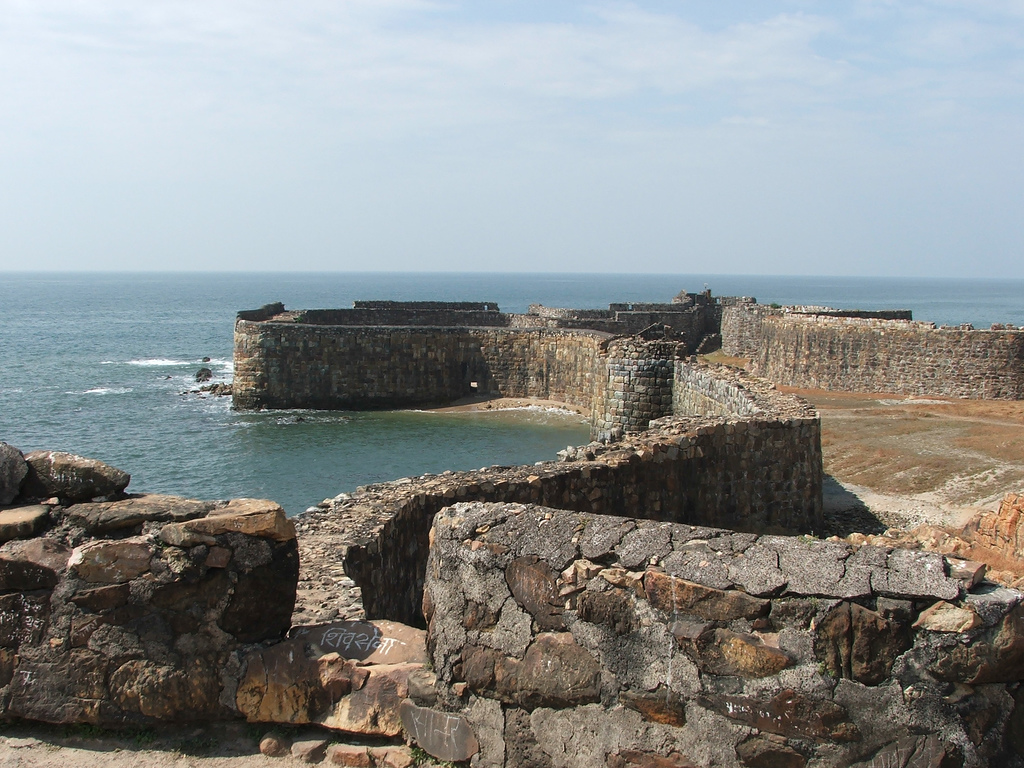
The Sindhudurg Fort near the Maharashtra-Goa border, one of the several naval fortifications built by the Maratha Navy

== Limitations ==
The Maratha Navy was primarily a coastal "green water" navy, compared to an ocean-going or "blue water" navy. Their ships were dependent on land/sea breezes. The Maratha did not build ships large enough to engage European ships out at sea far from the coastal waters.

== Battle tactics ==
Some of the battle tactics of the Marathas (during the reign of Admiral Kanhoji Angre) were as below:

- As far as possible, no engagement on the high seas; coastal waters were preferred, since the stronger winds at sea would benefit foreign ships because of their better spread of sail
- Attack was generally from the leeward or astern side. If enemy ships were to pursue the Maratha ships, the latter could make the use of shallow creeks and bays as a cover, where larger enemy ships could not follow
- Attack from astern ensured that the enemy ships could not bring to bear her broadside guns while Maratha Grabs could deploy its guns firing over the prow
- A constant readiness for a retreat, making use of the creeks and fort guns
- Enemy ships were captured by hand-to-hand combat after boarding the ship
- Spread out ships in small squadrons rather than having them all at one place
- Tire out the enemy by heavily defending the forts and avoid getting lured at open seas

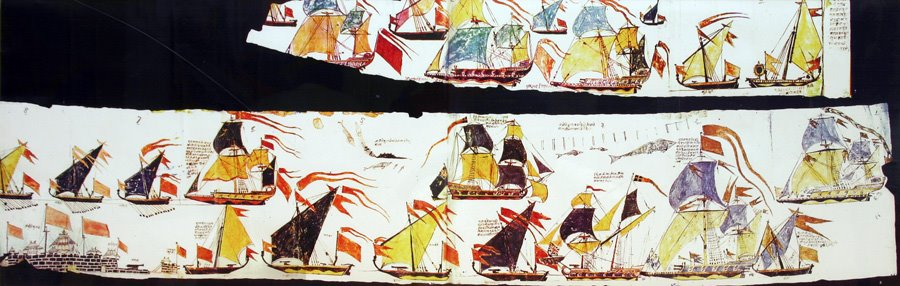
A painted scroll showing Gurab, Galbat and other types of warships of the Maratha Navy

== Decline ==
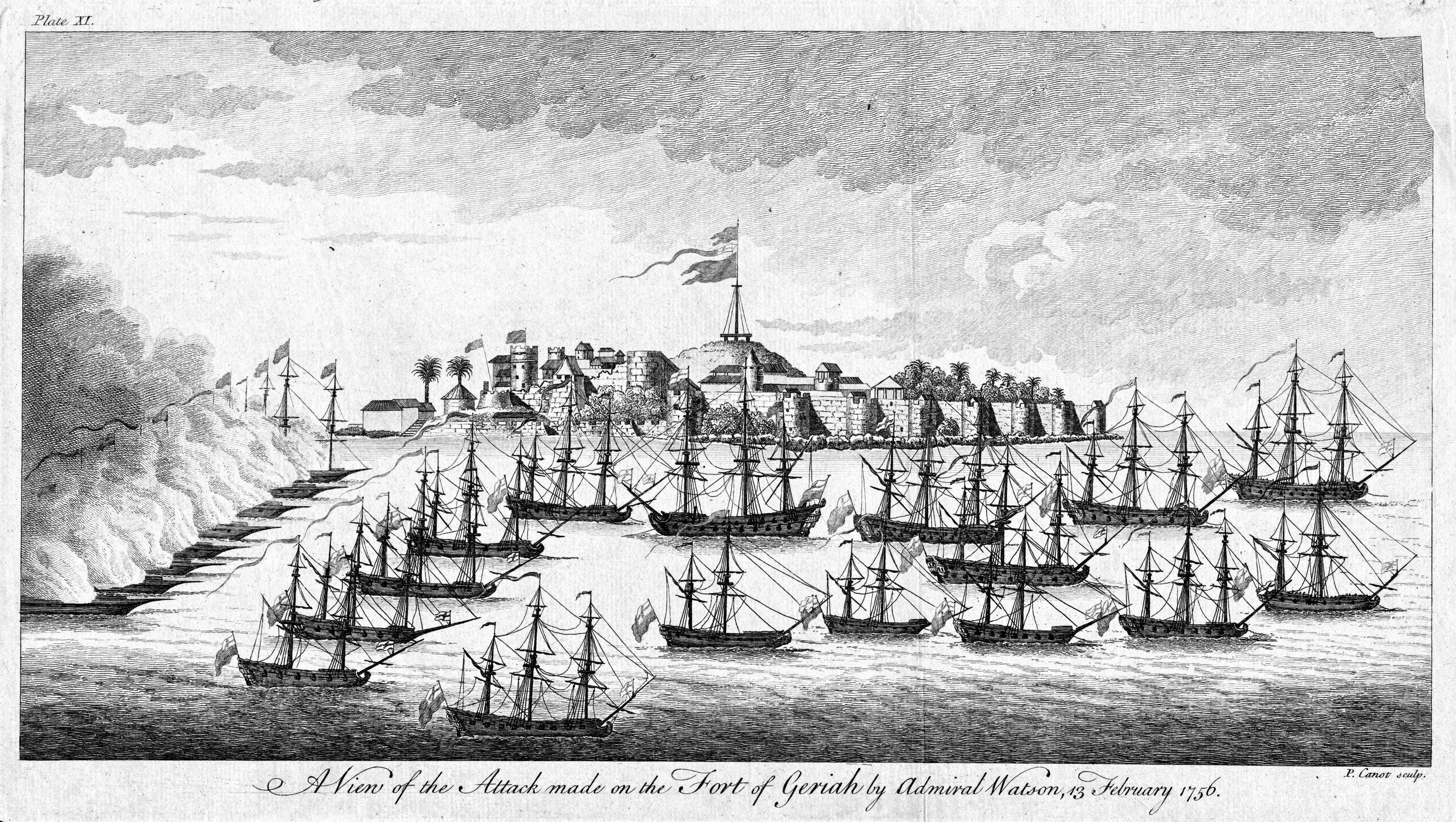
British and Maratha fleets engage in the Battle of Vijaydurg.

By the mid 1700s, especially when compared to the Bombay Marine, the Maratha Navy declined in power rapidly. Unlike Kanhoji Angre, his successor Admiral Tulaji Angre resisted the authority of the ruling Peshwa (the de facto chief or the First Minister of Maratha Confederacy). The Peshwas (under Nanasaheb) (in concert with the British) engaged in a war against Tulaji, in which the British managed to get an opportunity to capture and burn a portion of the Maratha naval fleet.

The Peshwas reconfigured and re-established the navy under the leadership of the Dhulap family, in particular Rudraji Dhulap, as he succeeded Tulaji as the Admiral or Sarkhel of the Maratha Navy. The British were easily able to overpower the declining Maratha Navy during the First Anglo-Maratha War. Through the 1760s and 1780s, the Maratha Navy was commanded by Rudraji Dhulap and by Anandrao Dhulap. In the late 1700s, whenever the Marathas were engaged in battles or conflicts with either the British or Hyder Ali of Mysore, the Maratha Navy undertook operations against enemy ships.

In 1818, after the end of the third and final Anglo-Maratha War, the Angre family became a vassal of the British however a small Angre state lingered on till 1840, after which it was finally annexed to British India.

== In popular media ==
The 2007 Hollywood film Pirates of the Caribbean: At World's End portrays a character named Sri Sumbahjee, which is a purported reference to Sambhaji, son of Maratha Naval officer Kanhoji Angre.

== Commemorations ==
- In 2022, the Indian Naval Ensign was modified to include an Octagon, emulating the royal seal of Chhatrapathi Shivaji.
- The Western Naval command of the Indian Navy has been named INS Angre, in commemoration of Admiral Kanhoji Angre.
- The Indian Navy has named two of its submarines as INS Khanderi after a Maratha sea fort of same name
- The Indian Postal Service released a commemorative stamp depicting a Gurab and Pal of the Maratha fleet.

== See also ==
- Indian maritime history
- History of India
- History of the Indian Navy
