= Kolli, Sistan and Baluchestan =

Kolli كلي
- Village
- Location within Iran
- Coordinates: 28°31′19″N 60°40′17″E
- Country: Iran
- Province: Sistan and Baluchestan
- County: Khash
- Bakhsh: Nukabad
- Rural District: Eskelabad

Population (2006)
  - Total: 17
- Time zone: UTC+3:30 (IRST)
  - Summer (DST): UTC+4:30 (IRDT)

Kolli (Persian: كلي, also Romanized as Kollī and Kalī) is a village in Eskelabad Rural District, Nukabad District, Khash County, Sistan and Baluchestan Province, Iran. At the 2006 census, its population was 17, in 4 families.
