= Kul, Iran =

Kul كول
- Village
- Location within Iran
- Coordinates: 35°43′20″N 46°42′14″E
- Country: Iran
- Province: Kurdistan
- County: Divandarreh
- Bakhsh: Saral
- Rural District: Saral

Population (2006)
  - Total: 529
- Time zone: UTC+3:30 (IRST)
  - Summer (DST): UTC+4:30 (IRDT)

Kul (Persian: كول, also Romanized as Kūl; also known as Kol) is a village in Saral Rural District, Saral District, Divandarreh County, Kurdistan Province, Iran. At the 2006 census, its population was 529, in 102 families. The village is populated by Kurds.
