= Koli language =

Koli is any of several Indo-Aryan languages of India, closely related to Gujarati:

- Kachi Koli language
- Parkari Koli language
- Wadiyara Koli language (Tharadari Koli)

== See also ==
- Koli (disambiguation)
