= Laya Patil =

Maratha Navy leader

Sarpatil Laya Patil
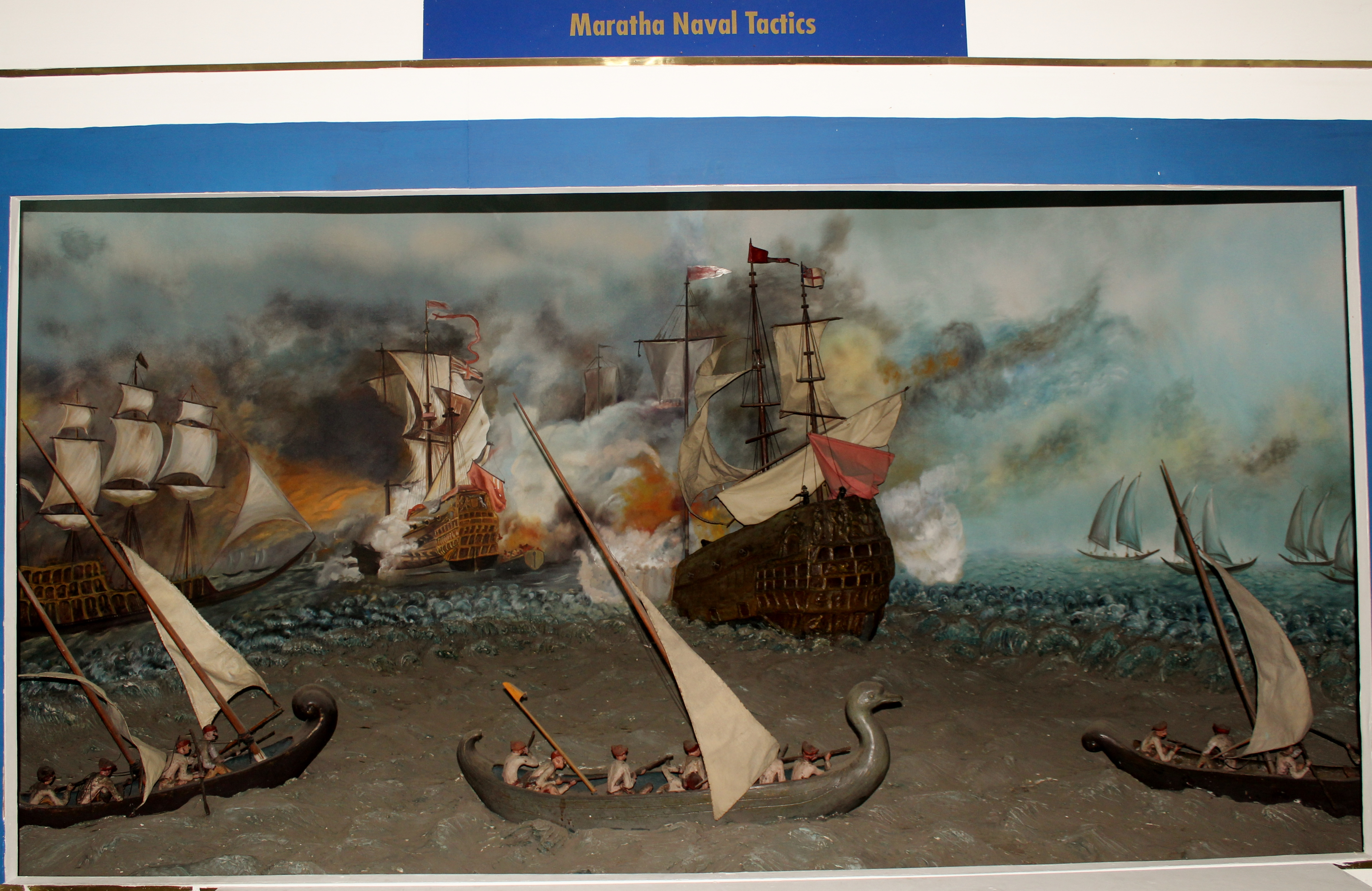
- Maratha Navy
- Born: Alibaug, Maratha Empire
- Military career
- Allegiance: Maratha Empire
- Branch: Maratha Navy
- Service years: 10 years
- Rank: Daryasarang
- Nickname: Daryasarang
- Unit: Mavala fleet
- Commands: Siege of Janjira
- Awards: A warship named Palkhi, title of Sarpatil

Laya Patil, also spelled as Lai Patil, was the leader of a naval unit of the Maratha Navy of the Maratha Empire at the time of Chhatrapati Shivaji Bhonsle. He was in Alibag, present-day Maharashtra. Shivaji had built a warship in the honor of Laya Patil, which was named Palkhi and honoured with the title of Sarpatil.

He was made the chief of the naval fleet in the Maratha Navy to capture the Janjira island by Peshwa, after which Patil served in the Maratha Empire for ten years.

== History ==
In 1675, Shivaji, founder of Maratha Empire, wanted to include Janjira Island in the Maratha Empire, for which Patil received the order of attack on Janjira. The Prime Minister of the Maratha Empire Peshwa Moropant Pingle planned that under the leadership of Laya Patil, the Maratha navy would hang ropes for the climb on Janjira and later Peshwa will attack Janjira with Maratha army.

According to the plan, Patil hung 500 ropes around Janjira island in midnight with the help of Kolis, while avoiding Janjira's Siddi soldiers and got ready to attack. But there was no trace of the Peshwa. Patil waited for Peshwa and Maratha army till morning but no one came and Patil also could not attack Janjira because Maratha navy was very less if war had happened then Siddi would have defeated Marathas in less time, so Even before rising morning sun, 500 ropes pulled back and rolled back in frustration.

Seeing the courage and bravery of Patil, Shivaji called him to Raigad and honored him with the title of Sarpatil and built a special warship name Palkhi for him.

== Titles ==
- Patil, his family was hereditary Patil (chief) of Alibaug.
- Sarpatil, he received the title of Sarpatil for his daring services for Maratha Empire
