= INS Khanderi =

INS Khanderi may refer to:

- INS Khanderi (1968), Indian Navy submarine in service 1968–1989
- INS Khanderi (2017), Indian Navy submarine commissioned in 2019
