= Noida serial murders =

Noida serial murders may refer to:

- 2006 Noida serial murders
- 2008 Noida double murder case
