= Kali-ye Olya, East Azerbaijan =

Kali-ye Olya كلي عليا
- Village
- Location within Iran
- Coordinates: 38°47′00″N 47°11′00″E
- Country: Iran
- Province: East Azerbaijan
- County: Kaleybar
- Bakhsh: Central
- Rural District: Peyghan Chayi

Population (2006)
  - Total: 256
- Time zone: UTC+3:30 (IRST)
  - Summer (DST): UTC+4:30 (IRDT)

Kali-ye Olya (Persian: كلي عليا, also Romanized as Kalī-ye ‘Olyā) is a village in Peyghan Chayi Rural District, in the Central District of Kaleybar County, East Azerbaijan Province, Iran. At the 2006 census, its population was 256, in 53 families.
