= List of forts in India =

This is a list of forts in India.

== Andhra Pradesh ==
=== Coastal Region ===
- Anvika Fort
- Addanki Fort - Prakasam district
- Bellamkonda Fort - Guntur district
- Bobbili Fort – Vizianagaram district
- Dharanikota Fort – Guntur district
- Durgam Fort – Prakasam district (Kanigiri)
- Gajanan Fort – Visakhapatnam district
- Gonthina Fort – Visakhapatnam district
- Kondapalli Fort – Krishna district
- Kondaveedu Fort – Guntur district
- Machilipatnam Fort (16th century Dutch Fort) – Krishna district
- Mogalturu Fort - West Godavari district
- Nagarjunakonda Fort - Guntur district
- Parth Fort
- Udayagiri Fort - Nellore district
- Venkatigiri Fort - Nellore district
- Vinukonda Fort - Guntur district
- Vizianagaram Fort – Vizianagaram district
- Yanamandala Fort – Guntur district

=== Rayalseema Region ===
- Adoni Fort – Kurnool district
- Chandragiri Fort – Tirupati
- Chennampalli Fort – Kurnool district
- Devaraya Fort – Vijayanagaram district
- Gandikota Fort – Kadapa district
- Gooty Fort – Anantapur district
- Gurramkonda Fort – Chittoor district
- Konda Reddy Fort – Kurnool district
- Madakasira Fort – Sri Sathya Sai district
- Penukonda Fort – Anantapur district
- Ratnagiri Fort – Sri Sathya Sai district
- Siddavatam Fort – Kadapa district

== Arunachal Pradesh ==
- Ita Fort, Itanagar
- Bhismaknagar Fort, Roing
- Bolung Fort, Bolung
- Gomsi Fort, East Siang
- Rukmininagar Fort, Roing
- Tezu Fort, Roing
- Buroi Fort, Papum Pare

== Assam ==
- Garchuk Lachit Garh
- Garh Doul
- Kareng Ghar
- Matiabag Palace
- Talatal Ghar
- Rukmini Garh
- Sadiya Rajgarh

== Bihar ==
- Buxar Fort
- Darbhanga Fort
- Jagdishpur Fort
- Jalalgarh Fort
- Munger Fort
- Rohtasgarh Fort
- Shergarh Fort
- Great Dhaudanr Fort (Ruined by Aurangzeb).

== Chandigarh ==
- Burail Fort
- Manimajra Fort

== Chhattisgarh ==
- Bastar Palace
- Kanker Palace
- Kawardha Palace
- Chaiturgarh Fort
- Jashpur
- Khairagarh
- Ratanpur Fort
- Surguja Palace

== Dadra and Nagar Haveli and Daman and Diu ==
- Diu Fort
- Fort St. Anthony of Simbor
- St. Jerome Fort of Daman
- Moti Daman Fort of Daman

== Delhi ==
- Rashtrapati Bhawan
- Adilabad Fort
- Delhi Gate
- Feroz Shah Kotla
- Jahanpanah
- Najafgarh Fort
- Purana Qila
- Qila Rai Pithora or Lal Kot
- Red Fort
- Salimgarh Fort
- Siri Fort
- Tughlaqabad Fort

== Goa ==
- Aguada Fort
- Alorna Fort
- Anjediva Fort
- Betul Fort
- Cabo de Rama
- Chandor Fort
- Chapora Fort
- Corjuem Fort
- Gandaulim Fort
- Gaspar Dias Fort
- Mormugão Fort
- Nanuz Fort
- Naroa Fort
- Palácio do Cabo
- Ponda Fort
- Rachol Fort
- Reis Magos
- Sanquelim Fort
- Fort Santo Estevão
- Fort São Bartolomeu
- Fortaleza de São Sebastião
- São Tiago of Banastarim Fort
- São Tomé of Tivim Fort
- Tiracol Fort

== Gujarat ==
- Bhadra Fort, Ahmedabad
- Bhujia Fort, Bhuj
- Kanthkot Fort, Bhachau
- Manek Burj, Ahmedabad
- Pavagadh
- Roha Fort, Bhuj
- Songadh Fort, Tapi district
- Surat Castle, Surat
- Tera Fort, Kutch
- Uparkot Fort, Junagadh
- Patan Fort, Patan
- Idar Fort, Idar
- Bharuch Fort, Bharuch
- Dabhoi Fort, Dabhoi
- Indragad Fort, Palikarambeli
- Sachin Fort, Sachin
- Chhatrapati Shivaji Parnera Fort, Parnera Pardi
- Gaurav Fort
- Gaikwad Fort, Vyara
- Arjungad Fort, Vapi

== Haryana ==
- Ancient Fort (also called Safidon Fort)
- Asigarh Fort (also called Hansi Fort)
- Badshahpur Fort
- Buria Fort
- Dhosi Hill Fort - (Ahirs )
- Farrukhnagar Fort
- Fatehabad Fort
- Firoz Shah Palace Complex
- Gokalgarh Fort - ( Ahirs )
- Indor Fort
- Jind Fort
- Kaithal Fort
- Kotla Fort
- Loharu Fort
- Madhogarh Fort
- Mahendragarh Fort
- Maham Fort
- Nahar Singh Mahal
- Narnaul City palace, Jamrai (also referred as “Jatt” jagirdar)
- Pinjore Fort
- Raipur Rani Fort
- Sadhaura Fort
- Sirsa Fort in Sirsa
- Tosham Fort
- Thanesar Fort

== Himachal Pradesh ==
This is the list of forts in Himachal Pradesh:

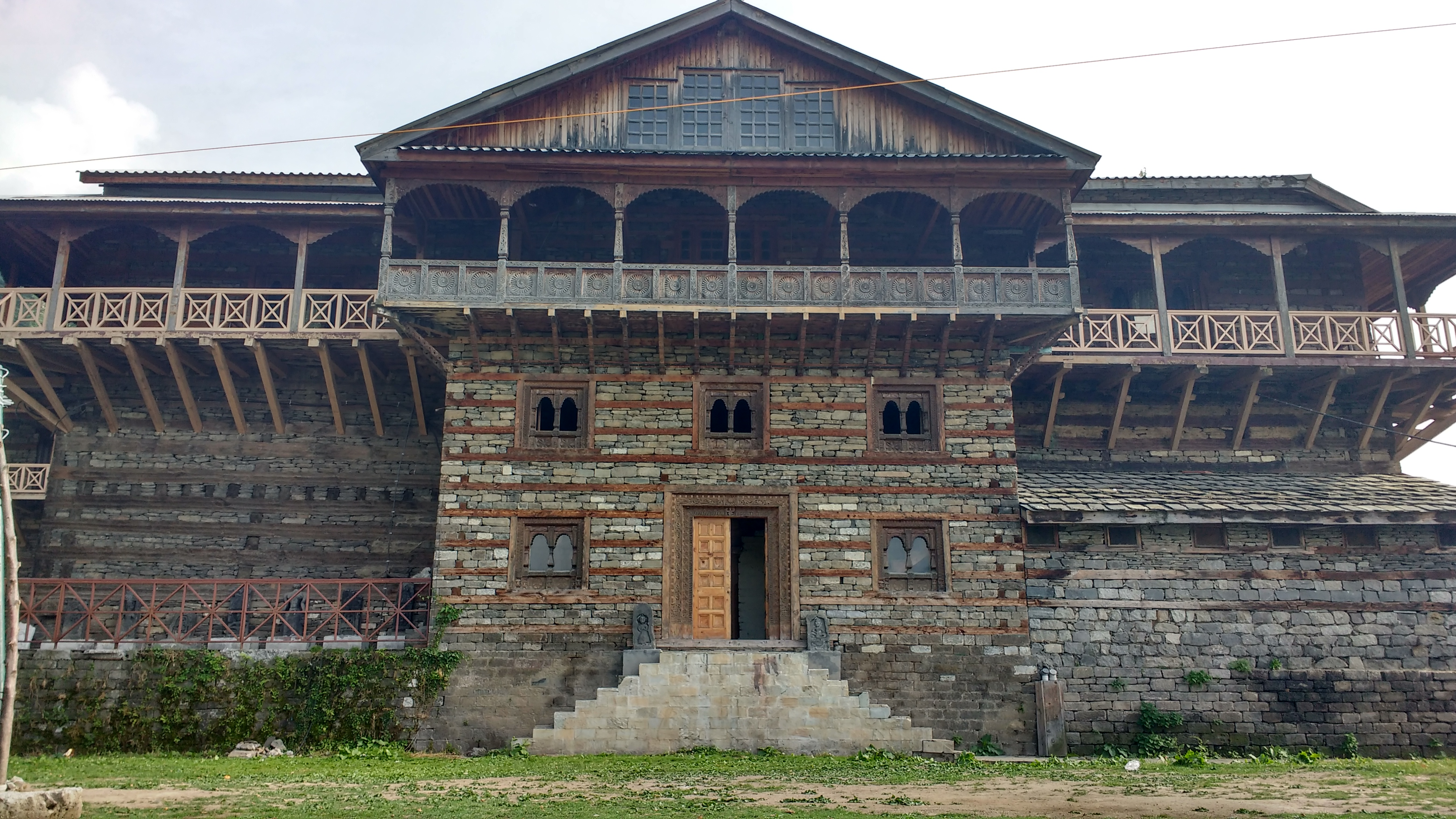
Naggar Castle, Naggar, Kullu

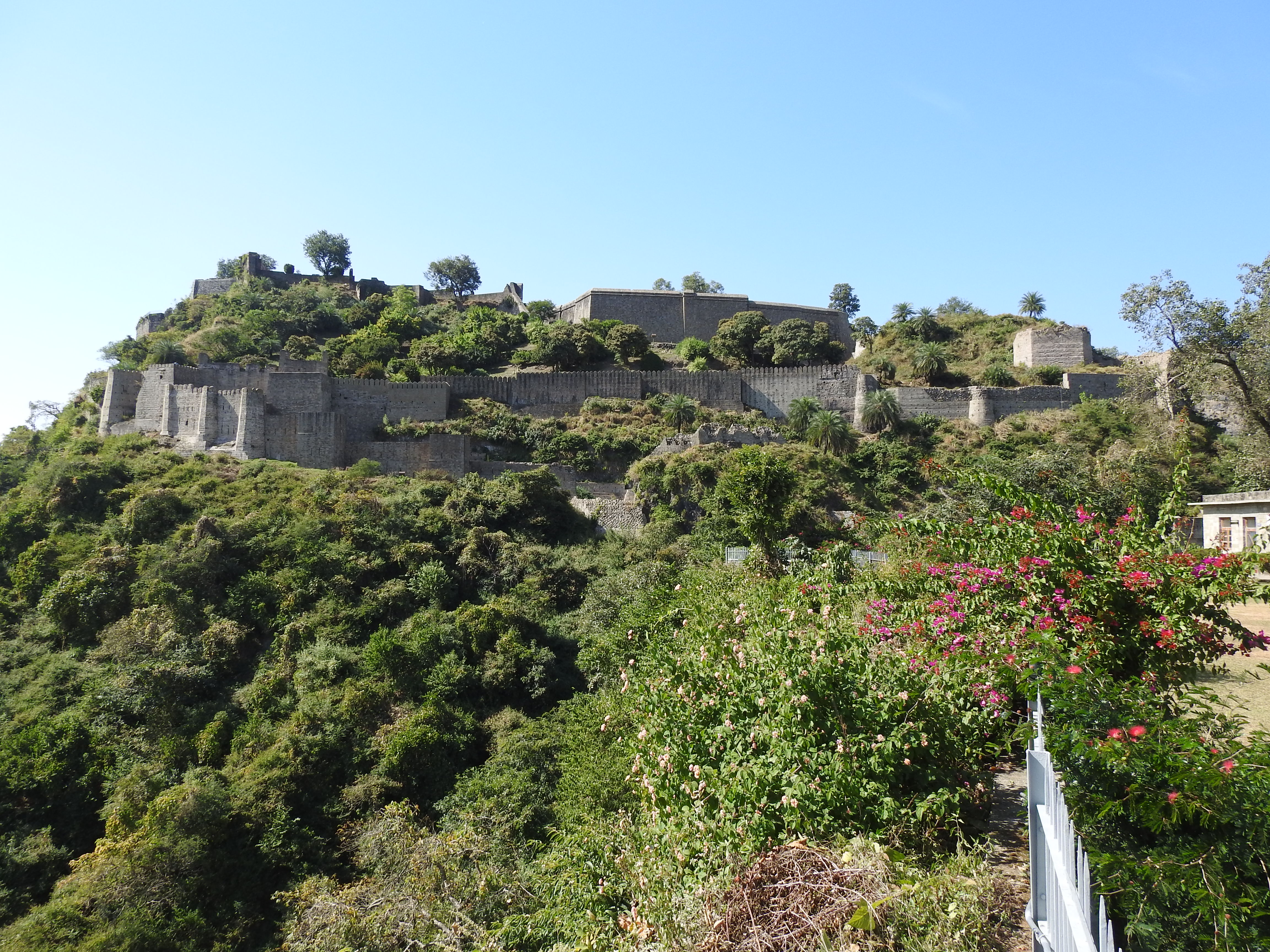
Kangra Fort, Kangra

- Anantpur Fort, Mandi
- Arki Fort, Arki
- Bachhretu Fort, Ghumarwin
- Bahadurpur Fort , Bilaspur
- Banasar Fort, Kasauli
- Baseh Fort, Ghumarwin
- Beja Palace, Kasauli
- Chandari Fort, Shillai
- Chaupal Fort, Chaupal
- Chehni Kothi Fort, Banjar
- Dharon Ki Dhar Fort, Solan
- Haripur Fort, Dera Gopipur
- Haripur Fort, Haripurdhar
- Hindur Fort, Nalagarh
- Ganeshgarh Fort, Shahpur
- Gandhuri Fortress, Rajgarh
- Gondhla Fort, Keylang
- Jaitak Fort, Nahan
- Junga Fort, Junga
- Jawali Fort, Jawali
- Kahlur Fort, Bilaspur
- Kamlah Fort, Mandi
- Kamru Fort, Kamru
- Kangra Fort, Kangra
- Kot Kehlur Fort, Bilaspur
- Kotla Shahpur Fort, Shahpur
- Kunihar Fort, Kunihar
- Kuthar Fort, Kuthar
- Kutlehar Fort, Hamirpur
- Labrang Fort, Poo
- Mahal Morian Tal Fort, Mahasu Garh Fort, Bhoranj
- Mahog Fort, Mahog
- Malaun Fort, Nalagarh
- Mankot Fort, Nurpur
- Mahasu Garh Fort, Jubbal
- Mao Fort (vanished), Nurpur
- Manali Garh Fort, Manali
- Man Garh Fort, Pachhad
- Man Garh Fort, Banjar
- Mastgarh Fort, Nurpur
- Morang Fort, Poo
- Nadaun Fort, Hamirpur
- Naggar Fort, Naggar
- Nalagarh Fort, Nalagarh
- Nauni Fort, Nauni
- Nurpur Fort, Nurpur
- Pangna Fort, Karsog
- Pathiar Fort, Kangra
- Raghupur Garh Fort, Kullu
- Ramshahar Fort, Solan
- Ratnapur Fort, Bilaspur
- Ratangarh Fort, Kangra
- Samarkot Fort, Rohru
- Sapani Fort, Sangla
- Siba Fort, Kangra
- Sirmauri Tal Fort, Paonta Sahib
- Solasinghi Fort, Bangana
- Sujanpur Fort, Tira Sujanpur
- Talyara Kothi Fort, Kullu
- Tiyun and Siryun Fort, Ghumarwin
- Vijayapur Fort, Jaisinghpur

== Jammu and Kashmir ==
- Akhnoor Fort
- Bahu Fort
- Bhimgarh Fort
- Chiktan Fort
- Hari Parbat Fort
- Hiranagar Fort
- Ramnagar Fort

== Jharkhand ==
- Palamu Fort
- Shahpur Fort

== Karnataka ==
- Malliabad Fort
- Jaladurga
- Bahaddur Bandi Fort
- Kyadigera Fort
- Bidar Fort
- Basavakalyana Fort
- Bhalki Fort
- Manyakheta Fort
- Kittur Fort
- Parasgad Fort
- Belgaum Fort
- Saundatti Fort
- Ramdurg Fort
- Bailhongal Fort
- Hooli Fort
- Gokak Fort
- Shirasangi Fort
- Bijapur Fort
- Gajendrgad Fort
- Korlahalli Fort
- Hammigi Fort
- Hemagudda Fort
- Mundargi Fort
- Singatalur Fort
- Tippapura Fort
- Nargund Fort
- Magadi Fort
- Jamalabad Fort
- Barkur Fort
- Daria-Bahadurgad Fort
- Kapu Fort
- Havanur Fort
- Mirjan Fort
- Sadashivgad Fort
- Asnoti
- Sanduru Fort
- Bellary Fort
- Koppal Fort
- Anegundi Fort
- Kampli Fort
- Irakalgada
- Gulbarga Fort
- Sedam Fort
- Shahpur Fort
- Aihole Fort
- Badami Fort
- Bankapura Fort
- Savanur Fort
- Chitradurga Fort
- Devanahalli Fort
- Vanadurga Fort
- Channagiri Fort
- Kavaledurga Fort
- Basavaraj durga fort
- Uchangidurga Fort
- Budikote
- Fort Anjediva
- Gudibanda
- Wagingera Fort
- Bangalore Fort
- Bhimgad Fort
- Kammatadurga
- Pavagada
- Madikeri Fort
- Savandurga
- Makalidurga
- Vanadurga
- Sanmudageri
- Vishalgad
- Nagara Fort
- Basavaraja Fort
- Rayadurg
- Huthridurga
- Ambajidurga
- Manjarabad Fort
- Skandagiri
- Hosadurga
- Nagara Fort
- Sathyamangalam Fort
- Tekkalakote Fort
- Thirthahalli Fort
- Raichur Fort
- Yadgir Fort
- Bhatamra fort

== Kerala ==
- Anchuthengu Fort
- Bekal Fort
- Chandragiri Fort
- Cranganore Fort (also called Kodungallur Fort, Kottapuram Fort)
- East Fort
- Fort Emmanuel
- Fort Thomas
- Hosdurg Fort
- Nedumkotta, a city wall
- Palakkad Fort
- Pallipuram Fort
- St. Angelo Fort (also known as Kannur Fort or Kannur Kotta)
- Tellicherry Fort
- William Fort (also called Chettuva Fort)

== Madhya Pradesh ==
- Ater Fort
- Rewa Fort
- Ahilya Fort
- Asirgarh Fort
- Burhanpur Fort
- Champavati Fort
- Chanderi Fort
- Chandia Fort
- Ginnorgarh
- Govindgarh Fort
- Gwalior Fort
- Jawahargarh Fort
- Teli ka Mandir, Gwalior
- Sasbahu Temple, Gwalior
- Garrauli Fort
- Hinglajgarh
- Raisen fort
- Rampayli fort
- Rehli Fort
- Sabalgarh Fort
- Bajranggarh fort
- Sheopur
- Sendhwa
- Vijayraghavgarh
- Utila Fort

== Maharashtra ==
- Achala Fort
- Agashi Fort
- Ahmednagar Fort
- Ahme
- Ahivant Fort
- Ajinkyatara
- Ajmera Fort
- Akola Fort
- Akluj Fort
- Alang Fort
- Ambolgad
- Anjaneri
- Anjanvel Fort
- Ankai Fort
- Antur Fort
- Arnala fort
- Asheri Fort
- Asava Fort
- Avchitgad
- Avandha Fort
- Bahadur Fort
- Bahula Fort
- Balapur Fort
- Ballarpur Fort
- Bankot Fort
- Belapur Fort
- Bhagwantgad
- Bhairavgad
- Bhamer Dhule
- Bharatgad
- Bhaskargad/Basgad
- Bhavangad Fort/Bhondgad
- Bhorgiri fort
- Bhudargad Fort
- Bhupatgad Fort
- Bhushangad
- Birwadi Fort
- Bishta Fort
- Bitangad
- Bombay Castle
- Castella de Aguada/Bandra Fort
- Chanda Fort
- Chandan Fort
- Chandragad/Dhavalgad
- Chandwad fort
- Chauler Fort/Chaurgad
- Chavand fort
- Dategad
- Dativare fort
- Daulatabad Fort
- Dermal Fort
- Devgad fort
- Dhodap
- Dhunda Fort, Nashik District
- Dongri Fort
- Dronagiri Fort
- Durgabhandar
- Durgadi Fort
- Fatte gad
- Fort George
- Gagangad
- Galna
- Gambhirgad
- Gawilghur
- Ghangad
- Ghargad
- Ghodbunder Fort
- Ghosale gad
- Goa fort
- Gorakhgad
- Gowalkot
- Gunvantgad
- Hadsar
- Hargad
- Harihar fort
- Harishchandragad
- Hatgad
- Irshalgad
- Indori fort, Pune District
- Indrai fort, Nashik District
- Jaigad Fort, Ratnagiri District
- Jamgaon Fort
- Jamner Fort
- Jangali Jayagad Satara District
- Janjira fort, Raigad District
- Javlya fort
- Jivdhan
- Kalanandigad
- Kalavantin Durg
- Kaldurg Fort
- Kalyangad/ Nandgiri
- Kamalgad
- Kamandurg Fort
- Kandhar Fort
- Kanchana Fort
- Kanhera Fort (Chalisgaon)
- Kanhera Fort
- Kankrala
- Karha Fort
- Karnala Fort
- Kavnai fort
- Kelve Fort
- Kenjalgad
- Khanderi
- Kharda
- Kohoj Fort
- Kolaba Fort
- Koldher Fort
- Konkan Diva Fort
- Korlai Fort
- Korigad Fort
- Kothaligad
- Kulang Fort
- Kunjargad
- Kurdugad
- Laling fort
- Lingana
- Lohagad
- Machindragad
- Machnur Fort
- Madangad Fort
- Madh Fort
- Mailagad Fort/Mahelagad (Buldhana)
- Mahim Fort
- Mahimangad
- Mahipalgad
- Mahipatgad
- Mahur Fort
- Mahuli
- Makrandgad
- Malanggad
- Malegaon fort
- Malhargad/Sonori Fort
- Manaranjan Fort
- Mandangad fort
- Mangad Fort/Fort Mangad
- Mangalgad/ Kangori fort
- Mangi-Tungi
- Manikgad ( Dist.-Chandrapur)
- Manikgad (Raigad)
- Manohargad-Mansantoshgad
- Markanda Fort
- Mazagon Fort
- Middle Ground Coastal Battery
- Mohandar fort/ Shidka fort
- Mohangad
- Mora fort
- Morgiri Fort
- Mrugagad
- Naldurg Fort
- Nanded fort
- Nandoshi fort
- Narayangad
- Narnala
- Narsimhagad
- Nhavigad
- Nimgiri-Hanumantgad fort
- Nivati fort
- Oyster Rock
- Pabargad
- Padargad
- Padmadurg
- Palgad
- Palashi Fort
- Pandavgad
- Panhala Fort
- Paranda Fort
- Pargadh
- Parola Fort
- Patta Fort
- Pavangad
- Pettah of Ahmednagar
- Pisola fort
- Prabalgad
- Prachitgad
- Pratapgad
- Purandar fort
- Purnagad
- Rangana Fort
- Raigad Fort
- Rajgad
- Rajdher fort
- Ramsej
- Ramtek
- Rasalgad
- Ratangad
- Ratnagiri Fort, Maharashtra
- Ravlya Fort
- Revdanda fort
- Riwa Fort
- Rohida fort
- Sagargad
- Sajjangad
- Salher
- Salota fort
- Samangad
- Sangram Durg
- Santoshgad
- Sarasgad
- Sarjekot fort
- Sewri Fort
- Shaniwar Wada
- Shirgaon Fort
- Shivgad
- Shivneri
- Shrivardhan Fort
- Siddhagad
- Sindhudurg Fort
- Sinhagad
- Sion Hillock Fort
- Sitabuldi Fort
- Solapur fort
- Sondai fort
- Songir
- Songiri
- Sudhagad
- Sumargad
- Surgad
- Suvarnadurg
- Talagad
- Tandulwadi fort
- Tailbaila fort
- Takmak fort
- Tankai fort
- Tarapur fort
- Terekhol Fort
- Thalner
- Tikona
- Tipagad
- Tringalwadi
- Trymbakgad
- Torna Fort
- Tung Fort
- Tungi fort
- Udgir Fort
- Underi
- Vaghera Fort
- Vairagad Fort
- Vairatgad Fort
- Vajragad
- Vandan Fort
- Vardhangad Fort
- Varugad
- Vasai Fort/Bassein Fort
- Vasantgad
- Vasota Fort/ Vyaghragad
- Vijaydurg Fort
- Vijaygad Fort
- Vikatgad
- Visapur Fort
- Vishalgad/Khelna Fort
- Worli Fort
- Yashwantgad Fort
- Yeshwantgad
- Yeda Fort

== Manipur ==
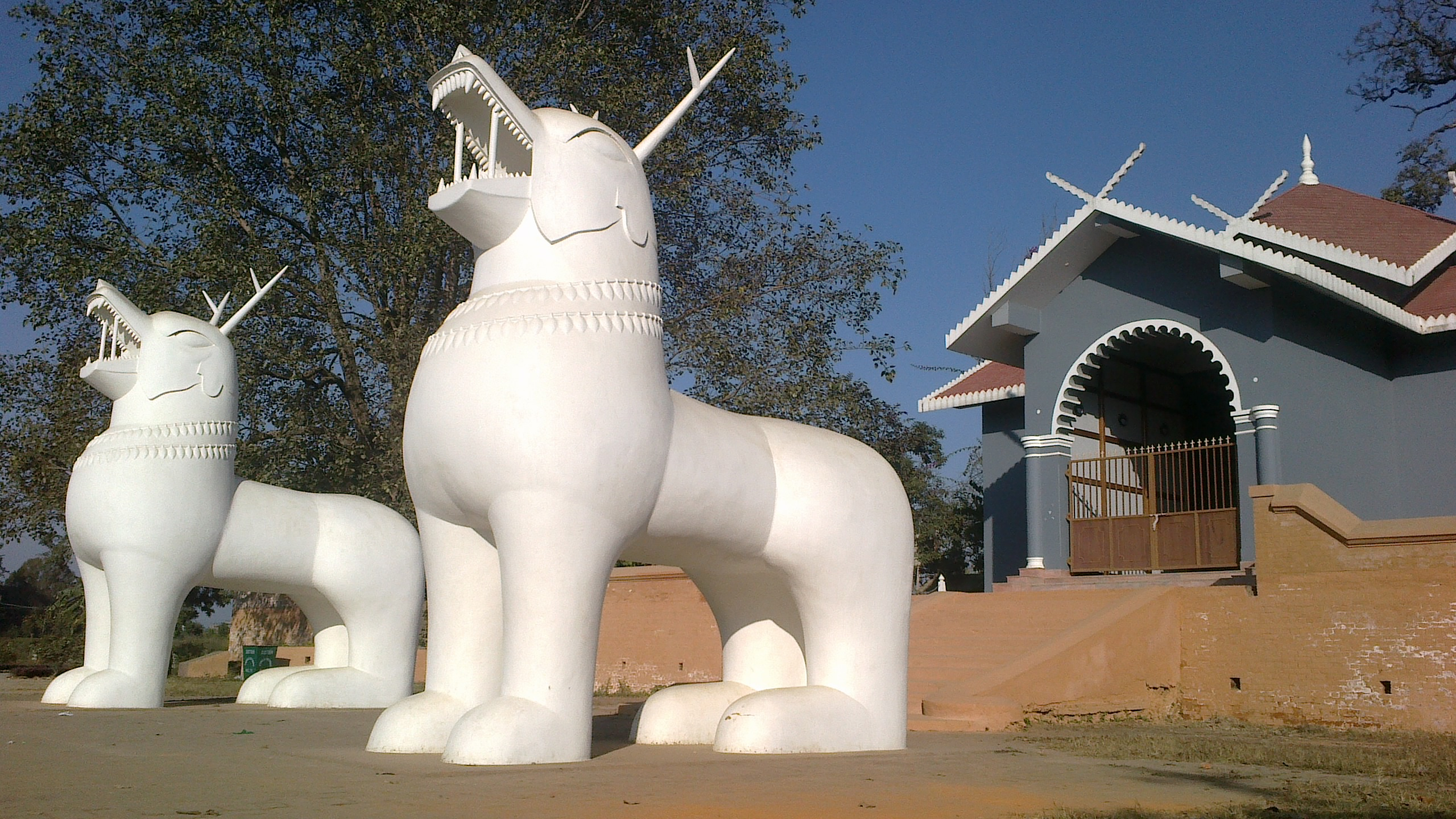
A pair of Kanglasha dragons at the inner gate of the Kangla Fort, Imphal

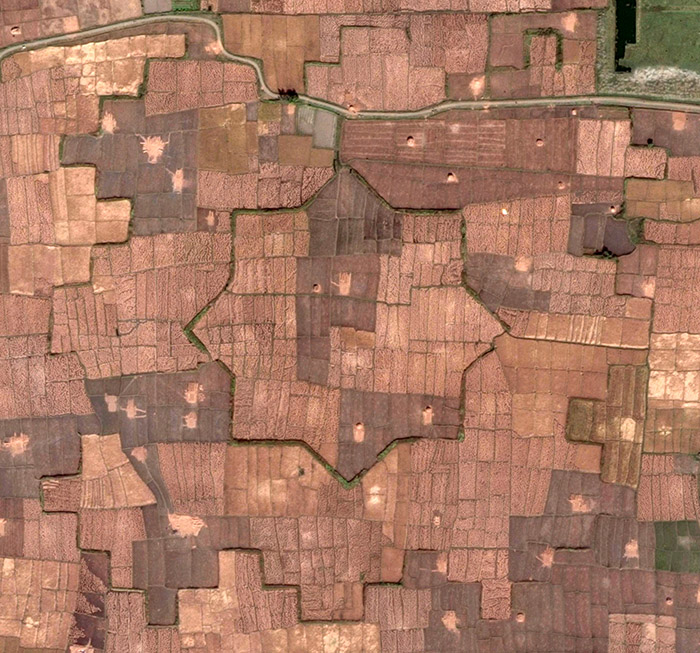
Bihu Loukon Aerial view, Imphal West District

- Bihu Loukon
- Kangla Fort

== Nagaland ==
- Semoma Fort (Khonoma Fort)

== Odisha ==
- Barabati Fort, Cuttack
- Chudanga Gada, Bhubaneswar
- Potagarh Fort, Ganjam
- Raibania Fort, Balasore
- Sisupalgarh, Bhubaneswar

== Puducherry ==
- French Fort Louis

== Punjab ==
- Gobindgarh Fort - Amritsar
- Bajwara Fort - Hoshiarpur
- Qila Mubarak (also known as Bhatinda Fort) – Bathinda
- Qila Mubarak - Patiala
- Qila Mubarak - Faridkot
- Shahpurkandi Fort
- Lodhi Fort - Ludhiana
- Manauli Fort - Manauli
- Phillaur Fort
- Payal Fort
- Manimajra Fort - Chandigarh
- Burail Fort - Chandigarh
- Phul Fort
- Bahadurgarh Fort - Patiala
- Sheesh Mahal of Patiala - Patiala
- Nabha Fort of Nabha - Nabha
- Jiundan Fort (residence of Raghu of the Phulkian dynasty)
- Phillaur Fort - Phillaur
- Keshgarh Fort – Anandpur Sahib
- Anandgarh Fort - Anandpur Sahib
- Lohgarh Fort - Anandpur Sahib
- Holgarh Fort - Anandpur Sahib
- Fatehgarh Fort - Anandpur Sahib
- Taragarh Fort - Anandpur Sahib
- Firozpur Fort - Firozpur
- Malerkotla Fort - Malerkotla
- Kotla Nihang Khan Fort - Kotla Nihung Khan

== Rajasthan ==
- Achalgarh Fort
- Adhai Din Ka Jhonpra, Ajmer
- Ajabgarah Fort
- Akbari Fort & Museum, Ajmer
- Alwar City Palace
- Alwar fort
- Amer Fort
- Bagore-ki-Haveli, Udaipur
- Baansi Fort
- Baansur Fort
- Badalgarh Fort
- Bhadrajun Fort
- Bhainsrorgarh
- Bhangarh Fort
- Bhatner fort
- Bikaner fort, Bikaner
- Chanva fort, Luni
- Chittor Fort
- City Palace, Jaipur
- City Palace, Udaipur
- Danta fort, Sikar
- Dayalpura Fort, Didwana
- Deeg Palace
- Devgarh Fort, Sikar
- Devigarh, Udaipur (now a heritage hotel)
- Dhamli
- Ekling Garh, Udaipur
- Fateh prakash palace, Udaipur
- Fatehgarh fort
- Fort Khejarla, Jodhpur
- Madhogarh Fort
- Gaur bati
- Gagron Fort
- Garh Palace, Jhalawar
- Gugor Fort, Baran
- Hameerpur Fort, tonk, Rajasthan
- Hawa Mahal, Jaipur
- Kesroli hill fort
- Hindaun Fort
- Jaigarh Fort
- Jaisalmer Fort
- Jal Mahal, Jaipur
- Jalore Fort
- Jag Mandir island palace, Udaipur
- Jag Mandir, Kota
- Jaswant Thada, Jodhpur
- Junagarh Fort
- Junia fort
- Kalaa fort, Alwar
- Kalla Fort, Alwar
- Kankwadi
- Kekri fort
- Kelwara Fort, Baran
- Khandar Fort
- Khejarla Fort, Khejarla
- Khetri Mahal, Jhunjhunu
- Khaba fort
- Khatoli fort, Kota
- Khinwara
- Khimsar Fort
- Kishangarh Fort
- Kotah Fort
- Kuchaman Fort
- Kumbhalgarh fort, Kumbhalgarh
- Kunadi Fort
- Kurki
- Lambiya
- Lake Palace, Udaipur
- Laxmangarh Fort
- Lohagarh Fort
- Madhogarh Fort
- Malkot Fort, Merta
- Mandholi Fort
- Mandore fort, Jodhpur
- Masuda Fort
- Mehrangarh Fort
- Mokham Vilas, Ajmer
- Monsoon Palace Sajjangarh fort, Udaipur
- Mukundgarh Fort, Mukundgarh
- Mundru fort
- Nagaur Fort
- Nahargarh Fort
- Neemrana
- Nua Fort
- Pagara Fort, Bundi
- Palaytha Fort
- Patan Fort
- Phalodi Fort
- Phool mahal palace, Ajmer
- Raghunath garh fort
- Raja Raisal Lamiya fort, Sikar
- Rajgarh fort, Alwar
- Rambag Palace, Jaipur (now a heritage hotel)
- Ranbanka Palace, Jodhpur (now a heritage hotel)
- Ranthambore Fort
- Ratan Vilas palace, Jodhpur
- Roopangarh Fort
- Sardar Samand Place, Jodhpur
- Sardargarh Fort
- Sarwar fort
- Shahbad Fort, Baran
- Shergarh Fort, Baran
- Shergarh Fort, Dholpur
- Siwana fort
- Sikar Garh Fort, Sikar
- Sojat Fort
- Taragarh Fort, Bundi
- Taragarh Fort, Ajmer
- Tijara Fort
- Timan Garh
- Umaid Bhawan Palace, Jodhpur

== Sikkim ==
- Budang Gaari Fort

== Tamil Nadu ==
- Vellore Fort
- Alamparai Fort
- Anchettidurgam
- Aranthangi Fort
- Attur Fort
- Dindigul Fort
- Droog Fort, Coonoor
- Erode Fort
- Fort Dansborg
- Fort Geldria
- Fort St. David
- Fort St George
- Fort Vijf Sinnen
- Gingee Fort
- Kenilworth Fort (Hosur)
- Krishnagiri Fort
- Manora Fort
- Namakkal Fort
- Padmanabhapuram Fort
- Rajagiri Fort
- Ranjankudi Fort
- Sadras
- Sankagiri Fort
- Tangrakottai
- Thirumayam Fort
- Tiruchirapalli Rock Fort
- Tiruchirappalli Fort
- Udayagiri Fort
- Vattakottai Fort

== Telangana ==
- Bhongir Fort
- Devarakonda Fort
- Elgandal Fort
- Gandhari khilla
- Golconda Fort
- Khammam Fort
- Medak Fort
- Nagunur Fort
- Nizamabad Fort
- Rachakonda Fort
- Ramagiri Fort
- Warangal Fort
- Asmangadh Fort
- Gadwal Fort
- Jagtial fort
- Shyamgad Fort
- Tejas Fort
- Trimulgherry Fort

== Uttar Pradesh ==
- Awagrah Fort, Etah
- Agori Fort
- Agra Fort
- Aligarh Fort
- Allahabad Fort
- Bijli Passi Fort
- Chapar Ghata Fort
- Chunar Fort
- Dalmau Fort
- Fatehgarh Fort
- Fatehpur Sikri
- Hathras Fort
- Hatkant Fort, Agra
- Jhansi Fort
- Kalinjar Fort
- Kuchesar Fort
- Kotarma Fort
- Naugaanv Fort
- Pinahat Fort, Pinahat
- Ramnagar Fort
- Ruhya Fort
- Senapati fortress
- Unchagaon fort
- Vijaygarh Fort
- Amethi Fort
- Jaunpur Fort
- Kaushambi fort
- Dileepnagar Fort, Kushinagar

== Uttarakhand ==
- Khagmara Fort
- Lalmandi Fort
- Malla Palace Fort

== West Bengal ==
- Buxa Fort
- Fort William
- Kurumbera Fort
- Fort Mornington

== See also ==
- Forts in India
- List of palaces in India
