= Hatgadh Fort =

Fort in Maharashtra, India

Hatgad Fort
- Part of Ajintha Satmal Hill Range
- Nashik district, Maharashtra

Site information
- Type: Hill fort
- Owner: Government of India
- Controlled by: Ahmadnagar (1521–1547); Maratha Empire (1739–1818); United Kingdom: East India Company (1818–1857); British Raj (1857–1947); India (1947–present)
- Open to the public: Yes
- Condition: Ruins

Location
- Shown within Maharashtra Hatgad Fort (India)
- Coordinates: 20°32′33.8″N 73°45′39.3″E
- Height: 3,600 ft (1,100 m)

Site history
- Materials: Stone

Hatgad Fort is a fort located 71 km (44 mi)from Nashik, Nashik district, of Maharashtra. The base village is Hatgad on the Nashik-Saputara Road. The nearest town is Saputara, which is 6 km from Hatgad village. It is a historic monument located in Maharashtra, India, south of the hill station of Saputara and near the border with Gujarat. It was built by the Maratha king Shivaji and is located at an elevation of about 3,600 feet. The way to reach the fort is through a trekking route via a narrow rocky path and car also go up to the stairs of fort. A statue of Lord Shivling is placed on the top of the fort.

== History ==
In 1547 King Bhairavsen, son of King Mahadevsen of the Bagul dynasty, defeated the Burhan Nizam shah of Ahmednagar and captured the fort. The Rangarav Aundhekar was the last Peshwa officer who held the fort. The fort was captured by Captain Briggs of East India Company in 1818.

== Places to see ==
There are four gates in a row on the main entrance path of the fort. The main entrance gate has an idol of lord hanuman carved in rock. There is a two rock cut water cisterns called Ganga and Jamuna on the fort plateau. The water is available round the year. There is an inscription in Sanskrit carved on the rock near the cistern. There are few building structures on the fort which are now in ruined state except got the ammunition store building which is in good condition.

== See also ==
- List of forts in Maharashtra
- List of forts in India
- Marathi People
- Maratha Navy
- List of Maratha dynasties and states
