= Pabargad =

Fort in Maharashtra state, India

- Part of Kalsubai Hill Range
- Ahmednagar district, Maharashtra

Site information
- Type: Hill fort
- Owner: Government
- Open to the public: Yes
- Condition: Ruined

Location
- Shown within Maharashtra Pabargad (India)
- Coordinates: 19°28′56.5″N 73°45′10.2″E
- Height: 4430 Ft

Site history
- Materials: Stone

Pabargad Fort is a fort located 50 km (31 mi) from Igatpuri via Bhandardara. The fort is in Akole taluka in Ahmednagar district, of Maharashtra. The trek to this fort is difficult.

== History ==
Not much history of the fort is known.

== How to reach ==
The fort is accessible in all seasons except the rainy season. The fort is located on the Igatpuri-Bhandardara-Sangamner road. There are two trek routes starting from village Guhire. A narrow path behind the Hanuman temple leads to the fort. The trek route passes through dense jungle and shrubs of Strobilanthes callosus (Karvi). It takes about three hours to reach the fort. The trek route passes through three plateaus and the final scarp to reach the top of the fort.

== Places to see ==
There are rock cut steps cut from the rock to reach the top of the fort. There are four water cisterns cut from the rock and the remains of dilapidated buildings on the fort.

There is a sculpture of the god Hanuman cut from the rock on the way to the fort and a temple of the god Bhairoba and an idol of Ganesha.

There are natural caves on the hillock adjacent to the fort.

== See also ==
- List of forts in Maharashtra
- List of forts in India
- Marathi People
- List of Maratha dynasties and states
