= Kurdugad =

Fort in Maharashtra, India

Kurdugad Fort
- Part of Sahyadri Hill Range
- Raigad district, Maharashtra

Site information
- Type: Hill fort
- Owner: Government of India
- Controlled by: Maratha Empire (1739–1818); United Kingdom: East India Company (1818–1857); British Raj (1857–1947); India (1947–)
- Open to the public: Yes
- Condition: Ruins

Location
- Shown within Maharashtra
- Location within Maharashtra Location within India
- Coordinates: 18°21′54.8″N 73°24′21.3″E
- Height: 2,020 ft (620 m)

Site history
- Materials: Stone

Kurdugad Fort is a fort located 143 km (89 mi) from Mumbai and 113km from Pune in Raigad district, of Maharashtra. This fort was an important fort in Raigad district as a watch over for the trade route from Pune to coastal ports. The fort is surrounded by thick forest and hill slopes.

== History ==
The Kurdugad Fort is also known as Vishramgad Fort. It was named after the goddess Krudai Devi whose temple is constructed at the base of the fort. The fort was constructed during the reign of Shivaji with the assistance of Sardar Baji Pasalkar. The Peshawas were in control of the Kurdugad Fort but it lost its importance once the British rule had begun. The fort was later brought in light by Dattoba Pasalkar, a descendant of Baji Pasalkar.

== How to reach ==
The nearest town is Kolad which is 125 km from Mumbai. The base village of the fort is Jite which is 25 km from the taluka place Mangaon. The fort can also be trekked from Dhamanwal village. It takes about 2 hours to reach the fort from the base village. The route is very safe and passes through dense jungle. It takes about one and a half hours to reach the tribal Katkari village called Pethwadi. From Pethwadi it is a steep climb of half an hour to reach the entrance gate of the fort. There is no water at the fort so, the night stay on the fort can not be made. The villagers from Pethwadi and Jite make night stay and food arrangements at reasonable cost.

== Places to see ==
There is one dilapidated Kurdai devi temple in the village Pethwadi. There are two pinnacles on the fort. There are two water cisterns on the fort which retain water even during dry summer season. The best time to visit the fort is from November to February.

== See also ==
- List of forts in Maharashtra
- List of forts in India
- Marathi People
