= Chauler Fort =

Fort in Maharashtra, India

- Nashik, Maharashtra, India
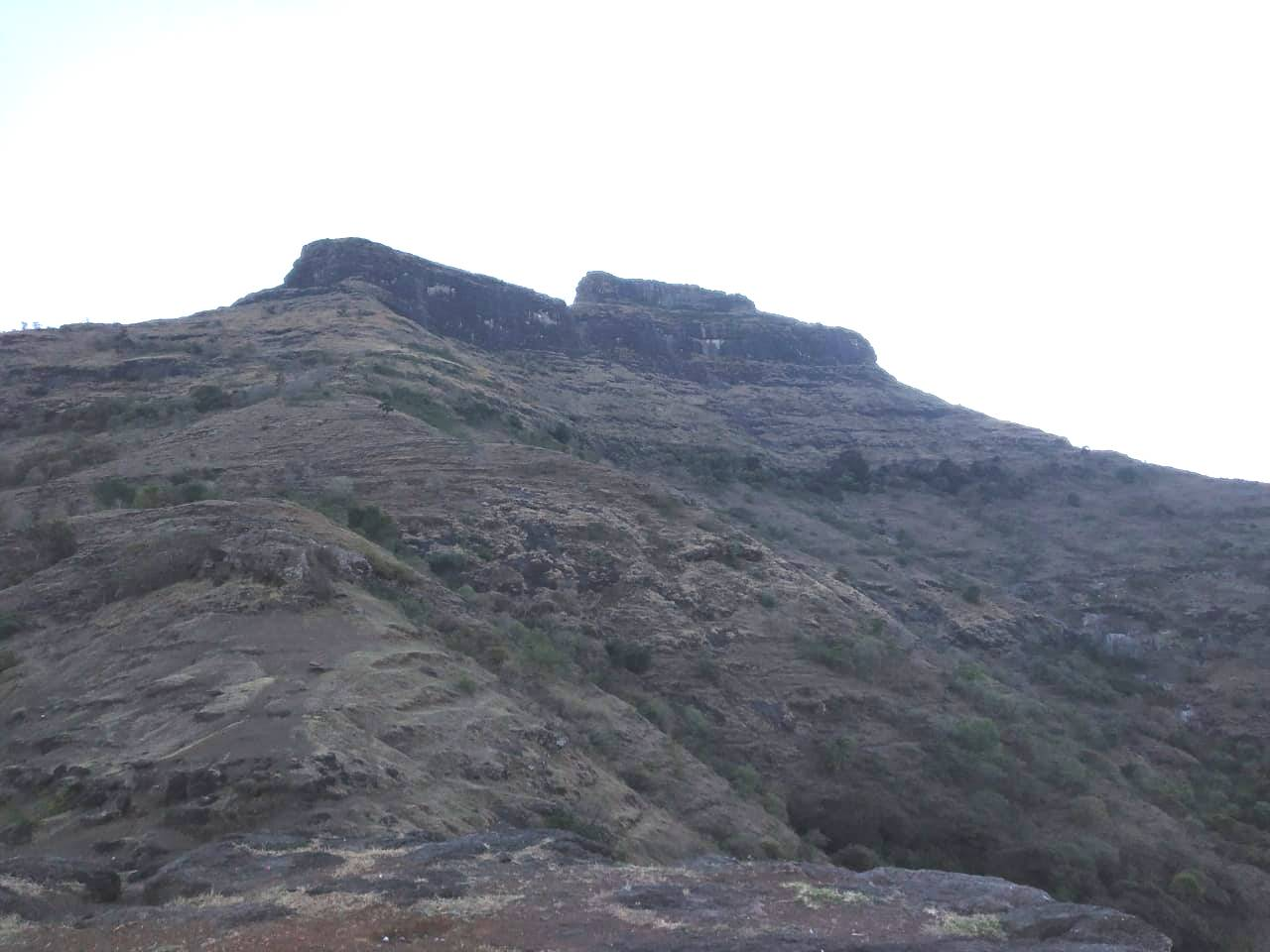
- Chauler Fort from Wadi Chauler

Site information
- Type: HillFort
- Owner: Govt. of India
- Open to the public: Yes
- Condition: Ruins

Location
- Chauler Fort Chauler Fort (Maharashtra)
- Coordinates: 20.575155°N 74.099934°E
- Height: 3700 feet

Site history
- Materials: Stone

Chauler Fort is a small fort located 100 kilometres (62 mi) north of Nashik, in the Indian state of Maharashtra. This fort can be visited in a day from Nashik. The nearest town is Satana.

== History ==
The history is similar to the Salher and Mulher forts. The fort was ruled by King Gawali. This fort was under the control of Maratha empire until it was captured by British forces in 1818.

== Places to see ==
The fort is located on a high tableland with escarpments on all the sides. There is a statue of Chauranganath on the fort, whose village fair is held every year on Pithuri Amavasya which comes in August every year. There are three entrance gates and 4 rock cut water tanks on the fort. The gates are good example of marvelous architecture. The interior building and the fortification is lying in ruins

== See also ==
- List of forts in Maharashtra
- List of forts in India
- Marathi People
- List of Maratha dynasties and states
- Maratha War of Independence
- Battles involving the Maratha Empire
