= Nimgiri-Hanumantgad Fort =

Fort in Pune district, India

Nimgiri- Hanumantgad Fort
- निमगिरी –हनुमंतगड
- Pune district, Maharashtra

Site information
- Type: Hill fort
- Owner: Government
- Open to the public: Yes
- Condition: Ruined

Location
- Shown within Maharashtra Nimgiri- Hanumantgad Fort (India)
- Coordinates: 19.294956°N 73.773003°E
- Height: 3450 Ft

Site history
- Materials: Basalt Stone

Nimgiri- Hanumantgad Fort (Marathi: निमगिरी–हनुमंतगड) is Located in Junnar taluka of Pune district in Maharashtra. These two forts jointly form two peaks on a same hill . It is one of the seven important forts along with Hadsar, Chavand, Shivneri, Jivdhan, Narayangad and Sindola forts that protected the trade route during medieval period from Junnar to Kalyan port through Naneghat. This is a fort located 25 km (16 mi) from the Junnar town.

== How to reach ==
The fort is accessible in all seasons. It takes about an hour to reach the fort entrance from the base village Nimgiri. The ascent is very steep till the saddle between the peaks is reached. It takes another 30 minutes to visit the entire fort.

== Places to see ==
There are a few bastions in good condition, the rest of the fortification is ruined. There are a few rock cut cisterns and remains of buildings on the fort. There are heroic stones(VeerGal) near the temple on the trek route.

== See also ==
- List of forts in Maharashtra
- List of forts in India
- Marathi People
