= Kunjargad =

Fort in Maharashtra, India

- Part of Balaghat Hill Range
- Ahmednagar district, Maharashtra

Site information
- Type: Hill fort
- Owner: Government
- Controlled by: Maratha Empire (1739-1818); United Kingdom: East India Company (1818-1857); British Raj (1857-1947); India (1947-)
- Open to the public: Yes
- Condition: Ruined

Location
- Shown within Maharashtra Kunjargad (India)
- Coordinates: 19°23′32.5″N 73°51′43.2″E
- Height: 4200 Ft

Site history
- Materials: Stone

Kunjargad Fort or Kombad Fort is a fort located 135 km (84 mi) from Kalyan by way of Khireshwar. The fort is in Akole taluka in Ahmednagar district in Maharashtra. The name of the fort is derived from the word “kunj”, meaning elephant in Sanskrit, due to the fort's resemblance to an elephant.

== History ==
Not much history of the fort is known. Shivaji halted at this fort in 1670.

== See also ==
- List of forts in Maharashtra
- List of forts in India
