= Dategad =

Fort in Maharashtra state, India

Dategad Fort/ Sundergad
- Part of Bamnoli range
- Patan, Karad, Maharashtra, India

Site information
- Type: Hill Fort
- Owner: Govt. of India
- Open to the public: Yes
- Condition: Ruins

Location
- Dategad Fort Dategad Fort/ Sundergad (Maharashtra)
- Coordinates: 17.379249°N 73.864191°E
- Height: 500 feet

Site history
- Materials: Laterite Stone

Dategad Fort is a small fort located 75 kilometres (47 mi) South of Satara, in the Maharashtra state of India. This fort can be visited in a day from Satara. The nearest town is Patan. The base village is Tolewadi from where an easy trek of 45 minutes leads to the entrance of the fort.

== History ==
The Patankars were the Deshmukhs under the Marathas of the whole surrounding district and had charge of Dategad fort. The fort was under the control of Maratha dynasty before the fort was taken into control by Captain Grant in May 1818.

== Places to see ==
The fort is located on a high tableland with escarpments on all the sides. The scarp is about 30 feet high. There is an entrance gate to enter the table land. One has to climb 20 steps to reach the top of the fort. The fort is spread over an area of 3 acres. There are 10 feet tall idols of Lord Hanuman and Lord Ganapati on the fort. There is a Shivalinga carved in the laterite stone near the well. The well is 100 feet deep cut in the laterite rock. There are two large water tanks on the fort.

== See also ==
- List of forts in Maharashtra
- List of forts in India
- Marathi People
- List of Maratha dynasties and states
- Maratha War of Independence
- Battles involving the Maratha Empire
