= Machindragad =

Machindragad Fort
- Sangli district, Maharashtra

Site information
- Type: Hill fort
- Owner: Government of India
- Open to the public: Yes
- Condition: Ruins

Location
- Shown within Maharashtra Machindragad Fort (India)
- Coordinates: 17°09′48.7″N 74°16′07.8″E

Site history
- Materials: Stone

Machindragad Fort is a fort located 20 km from Karad. Though it is close to karad town it is in Walawa taluka, Sangli district, of Maharashtra. The fort is situated on a solitary round topped hill east of the base village.

== History ==
This fort was built by Chhatrapati Shivaji Maharaj in 1676. Though it is called a fort there are no such fortification or bastions to be seen on the top of the hill except for few cannons and rock cut cisterns. The fort was garrisoned by the Pratinidhi till it was taken by Bapu Gokhale of Peshwas in 1810. The fort was managed by Bapu Gokhale until it was surrendered to British Army headed by Colonel Hewiti without resistance.

== See also ==
- List of forts in Maharashtra
- List of forts in India
- Marathi People
