= Payal Fort =

Historic monument in Punjabi, India

Coordinates: 30°43′24″N 76°3′28″E

Payal Fort is a Historic Monument of Punjab, built by Maharaja Amar Singh of Patiala Ryasat in Payal with the co-operation of the Mughals in 1771.

At present the fort has been undertaken by Archaeological Survey of India. Most of the part of The Fort has been renovated by Archaeological Survey of India but some of the interior renovation work is in under process.

In early centuries PAYAL was known as SAHIBGARH, after that Maharaja Amar Singh changed its name. The exact reason behind this is not known yet.

The interior of the fort is deteriorating.

== See also ==
- Tourism in Punjab, India
