= Bhupatgad Fort =

Ancient Indian fort

- Palghar district, Maharashtra

Site information
- Type: Hill fort
- Owner: Government of India
- Open to the public: Yes
- Condition: Ruins

Location
- Shown within Maharashtra Bhupatgad Fort (India)
- Coordinates: 19°49′8.14″N 73°17′36.87″E
- Height: 1600 fts above msl

Site history
- Materials: Stone

Bhupatgad Fort is a fort in Palghar district in the Jawhar taluka in Maharashtra state of India.

== Location ==
The fort is located about 130 km from Thane. The nearest town is Jawhar. This fort lay about 30 km East of the Jawhar town on northern spur of hills that run east from Jawhar. The Fort is situated near the villages Kurlod and Zaap.

== Places to see ==
This fort can be reached after an easy trek of one hour from the base village Kurlod or Zaap. There are no proper fortifications or bastions left on the fort except for two entrance gates in ruined state . There are few rock cut water cisterns and statues of Mhasoba and Hanuman on the fort.

== History ==
Very less history of this fort is known. This fort was important to keep watch over the Trimbak-Wada trade route. This fort was in the Jawhar princely state till 1947.
