= Aranthangi Fort =

- Location in Tamil Nadu, India
- 10.1631°N 78.9962°E
- Location: Aranthangi, India

History
- Built: 16th or 17th century

Site notes
- Architect: Tondaiman
- Architectural style: Dravidian architecture

Aranthangi Fort is a fortress situated in the town of Aranthangi in Pudukkottai district, Tamil Nadu, India. It was constructed in the 16th or 17th century AD by Tondaiman kings. Nearby, there is an 11th-century Hindu temple constructed by Rajendra Chola.
