= Kavnai fort =

Fort in Maharashtra, India

Kavnai Fort
- Nashik district, Maharashtra
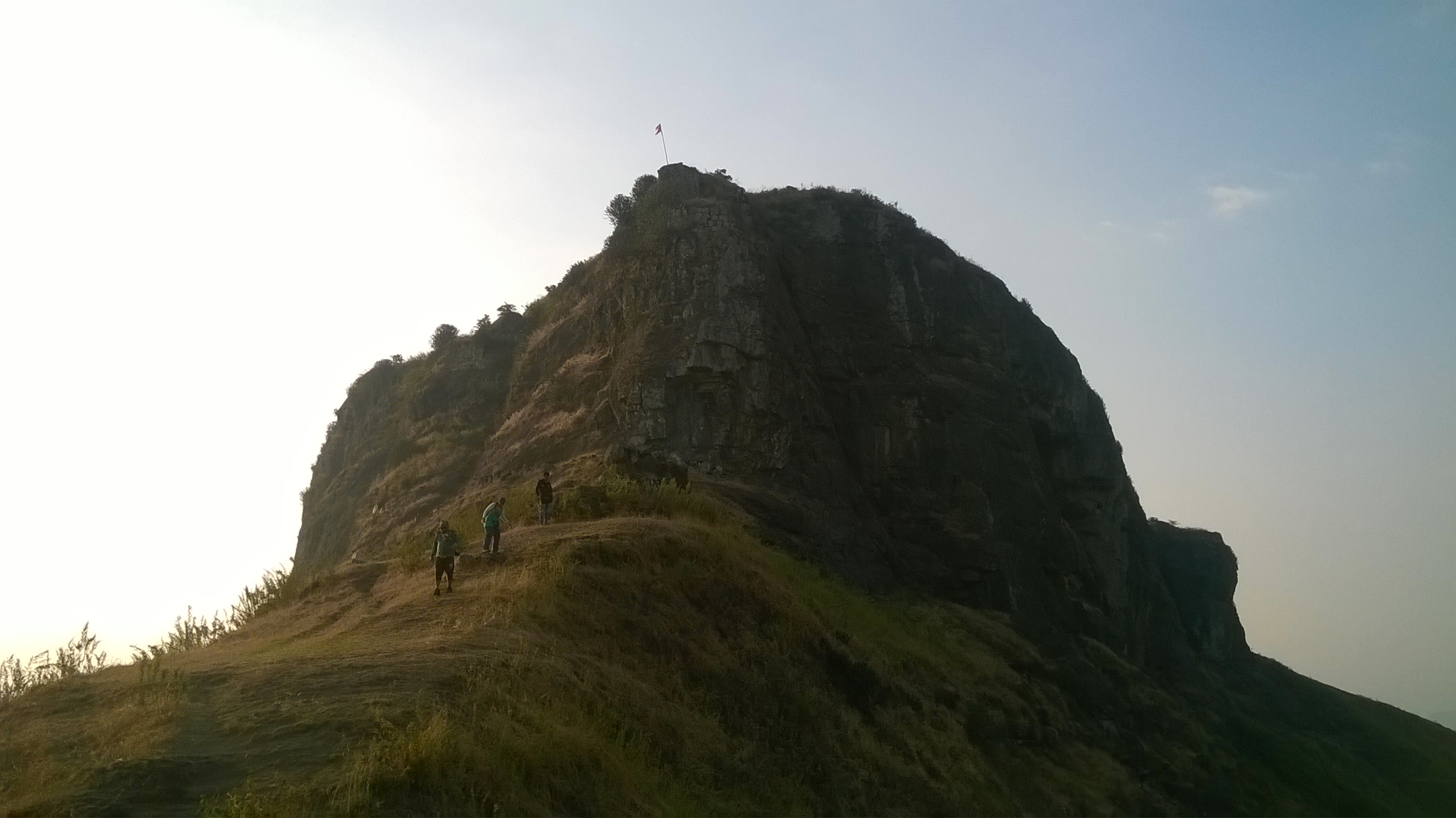
- Fort view from Kavnai col

Site information
- Type: Hill fort
- Owner: Government of India
- Open to the public: Yes
- Condition: Ruins

Location
- Shown within Maharashtra
- Location within Maharashtra
- Coordinates: 19°46′23.1″N 73°37′09.8″E

Site history
- Materials: Stone

Kavnai Fort is located in a hillock, north of Kavanai village in Igatpuri Taluka of the Nashik district in the Indian state of Maharashtra. The main gate and a small pond are the only remaining structures.

== Geography ==
Kavanai village is connected by a road to Igatpuri. Igatpuri is located 18 kilometers away. Kapilatirth is located near the Kavnai village.

The ascent to the fort follows a ridge that starts from Kavanai. The final ascent is vertical, with poor rock-cut steps crossed by a ladder.

== History ==
The fort was built by Moghuls. It was ceded to Peshvas by Nizam under the terms of the treaty after the Battle of Udgir (1760). This fort, along with Tringalwadi and fifteen others were captured by the British army under the leadership of Col. Briggs.

== Gallery ==
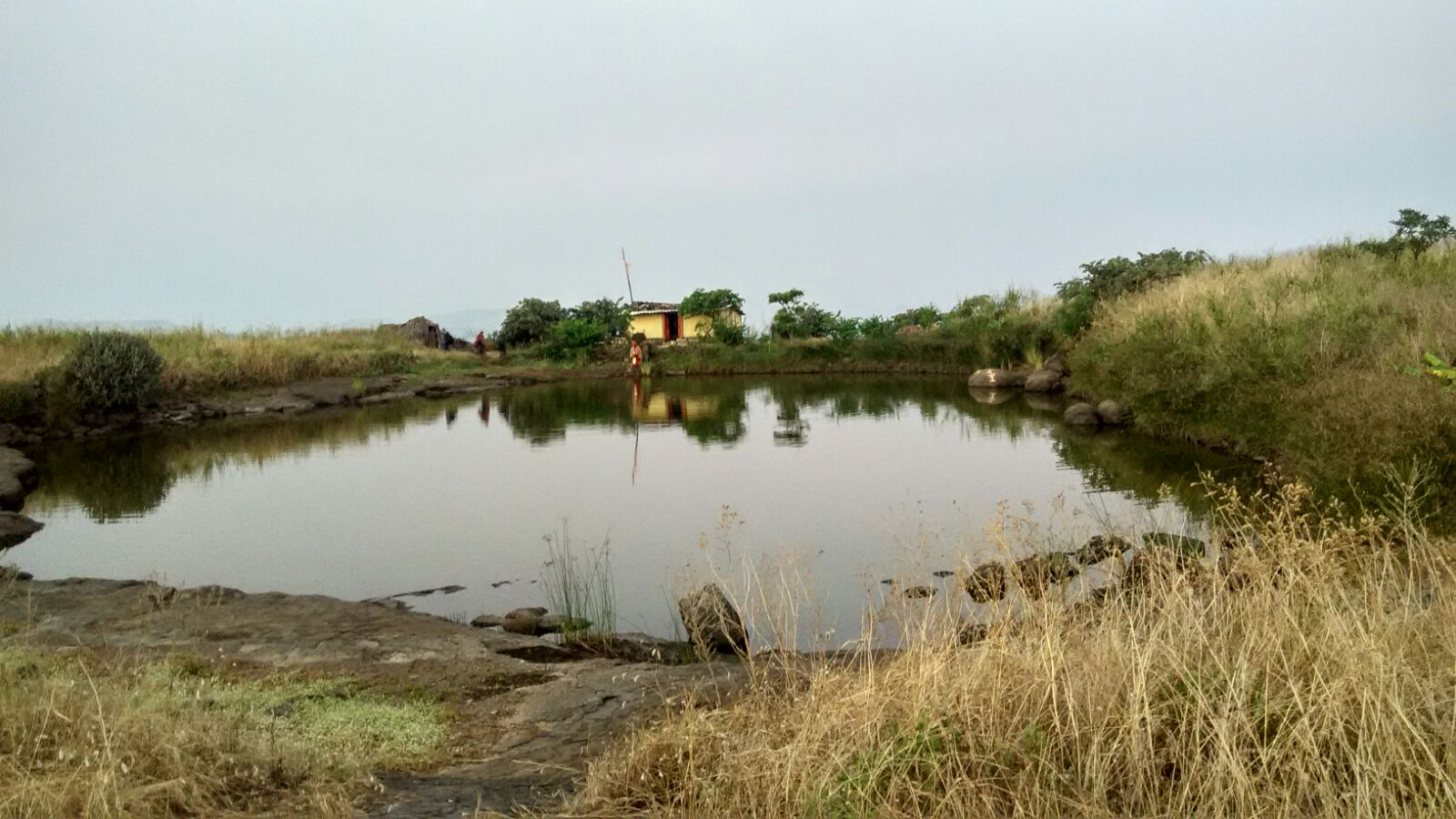
Pond at the fort

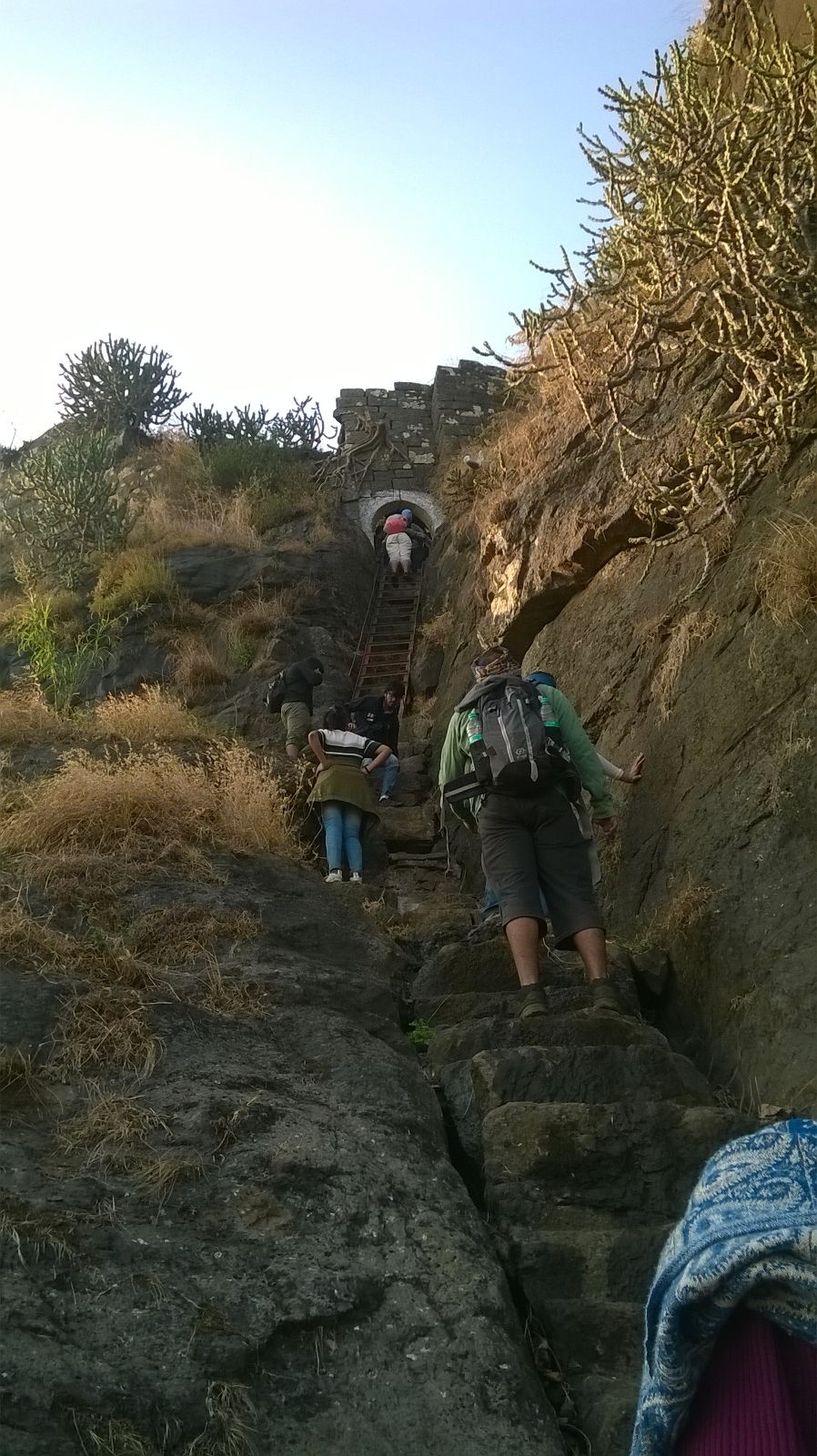
Main entrance of the fort
