= Manikgad (Raigad) =

Manikgad Fort (Raigad)
- Raigad district, Maharashtra
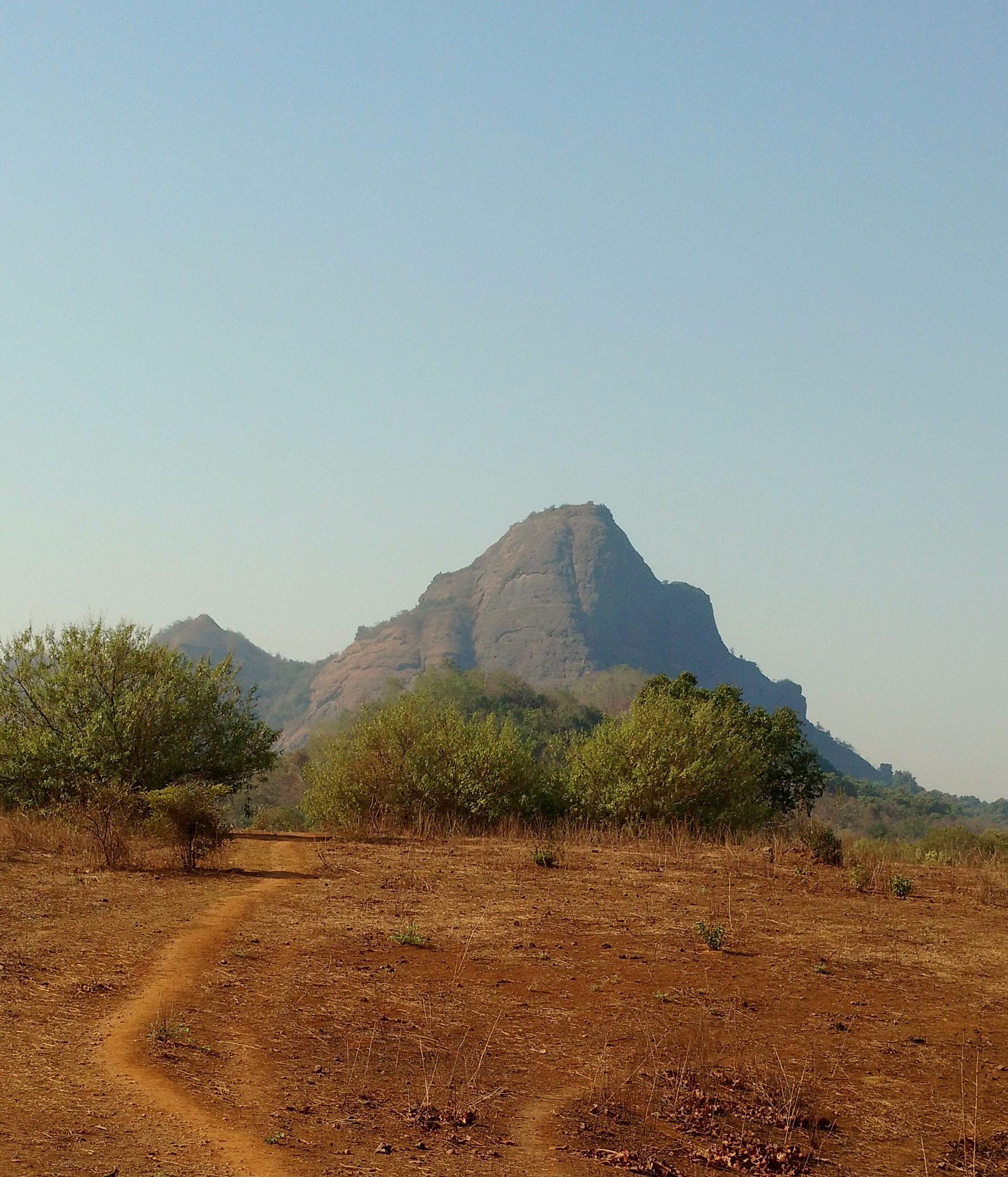
- Manikgad fort from Katkarwadi

Site information
- Type: Hill fort
- Owner: Government of India
- Open to the public: Yes
- Condition: Ruins

Location
- Shown within Maharashtra
- Coordinates: 18°49′33.3″N 73°11′34.9″E
- Height: 1876.64 feet

Site history
- Built: 1700 (approx)
- Built by: Sarkhel Kanhoji Angre
- Materials: Stone
- Demolished: 1818

Manikgad is a mountain fortress and temple in Gherakilla Manikgad, India. Located among rolling hills, the temple is a popular hiking spot. Manikgad was built to oversee the trade route from Maval (Pune) to coastal ports. The fort is situated near Vashivali (Rasayani MIDC), which is 27 km from Panvel.

== History ==
The fort was built by Sarkhel Kanhoji Angre, to whom it was ceded in 1718 by Peshavas.

== Description ==
Only ruins of the fort remain. A big rock-cut cistern on the fort is called the "Darya take". A small shiva linga and a few small rock-cut cisterns are present. The Ganesh gate is the only standing structure. A circular trench is cut in the rock for lime mixing. Other nearby forts include Karnala, Prabalgad, Chanderi, Malang gad, Irshalgad, Sondai, Lohagad, Visapur, and Sankshi.

== Gallery ==
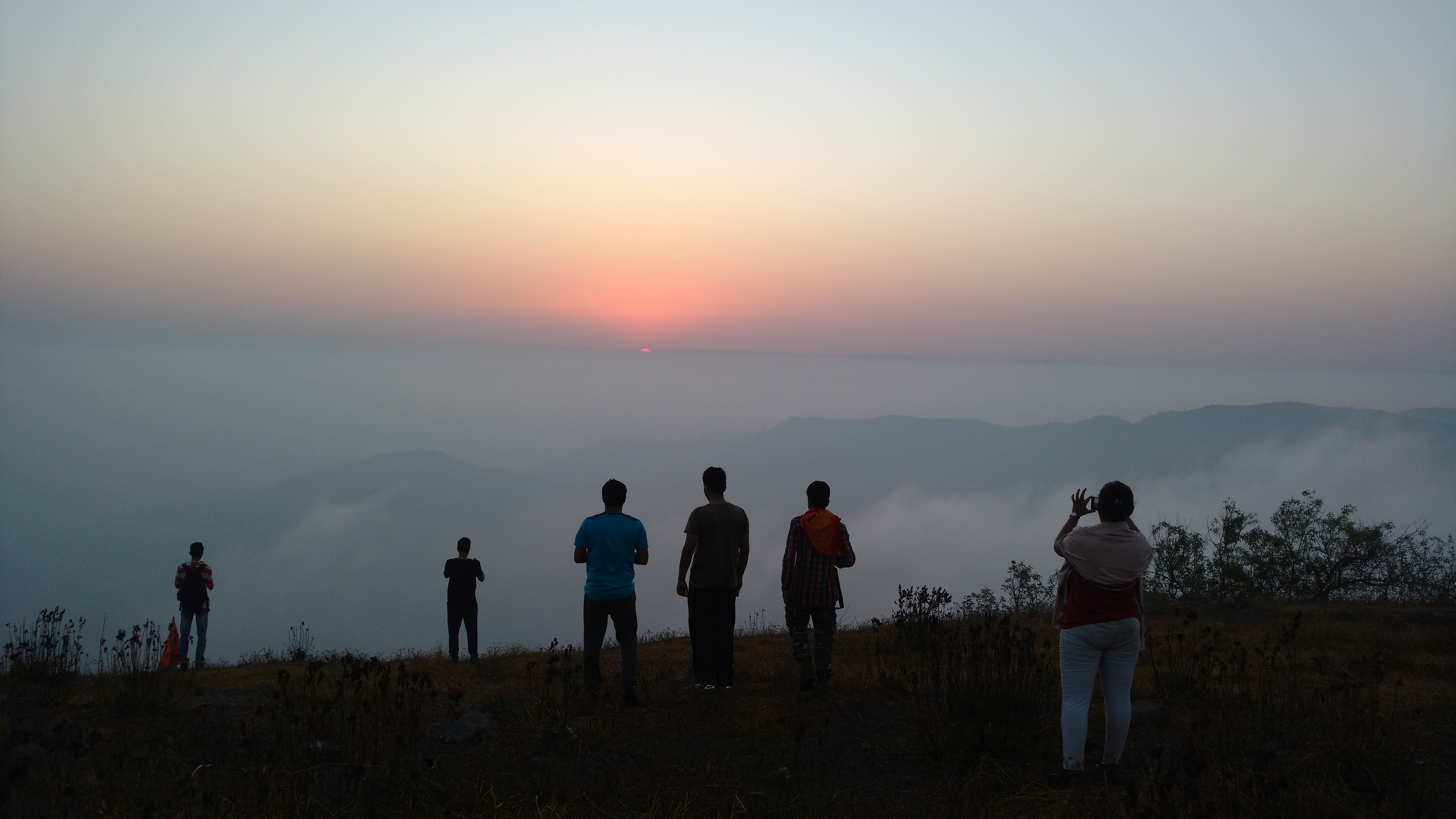
Sunrise in summer

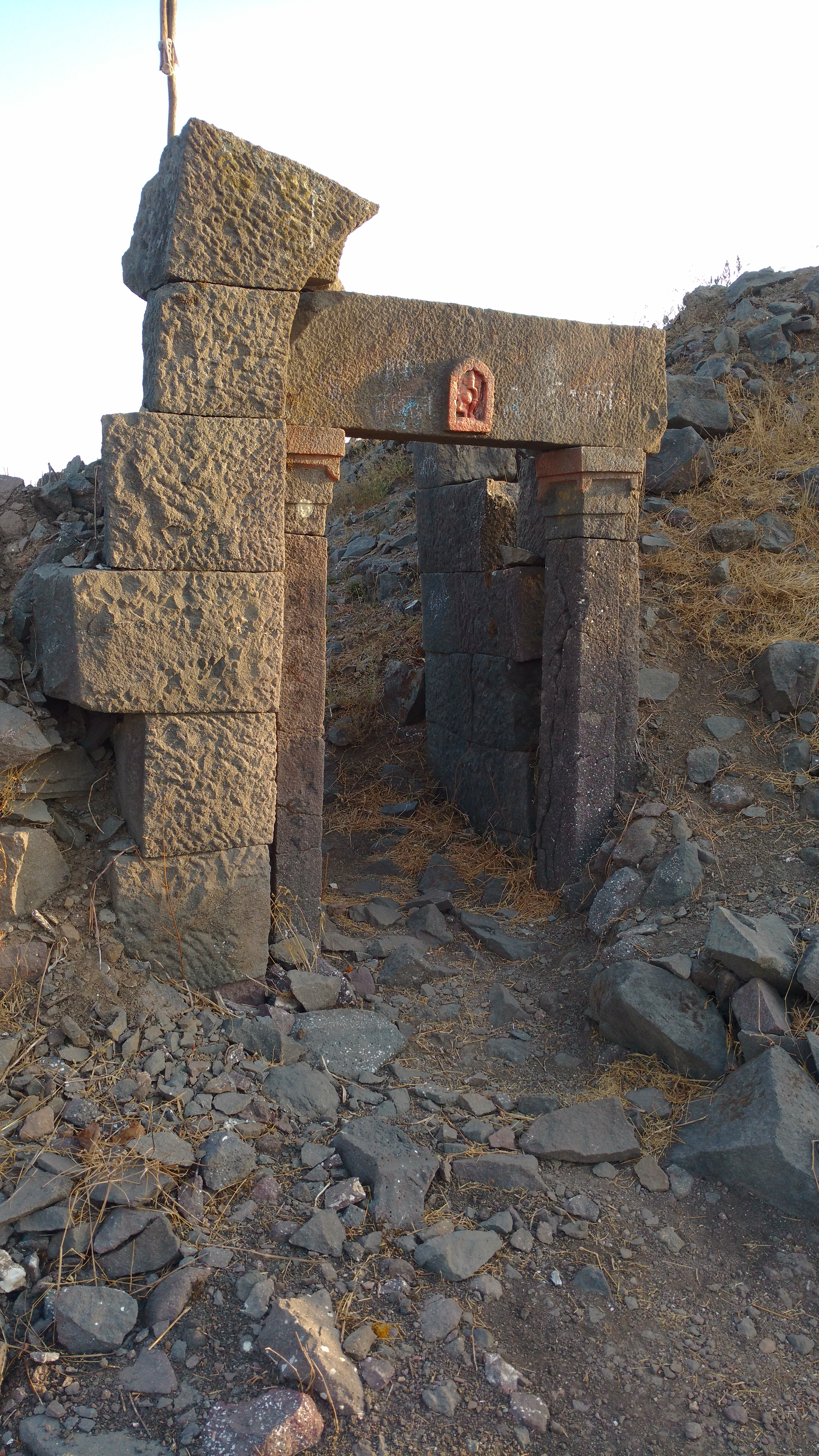
Hanuman gate

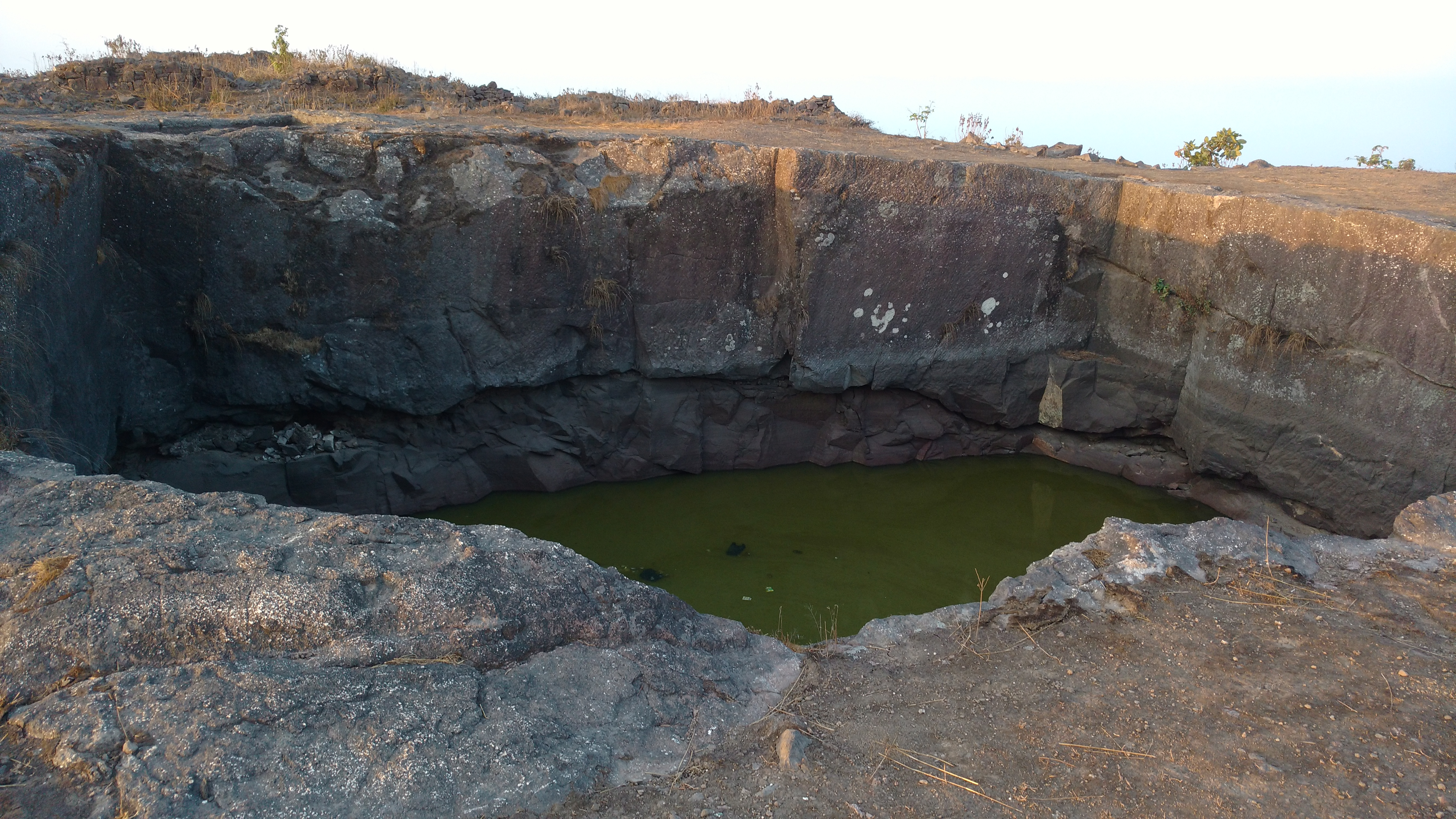
Rock cut water cistern

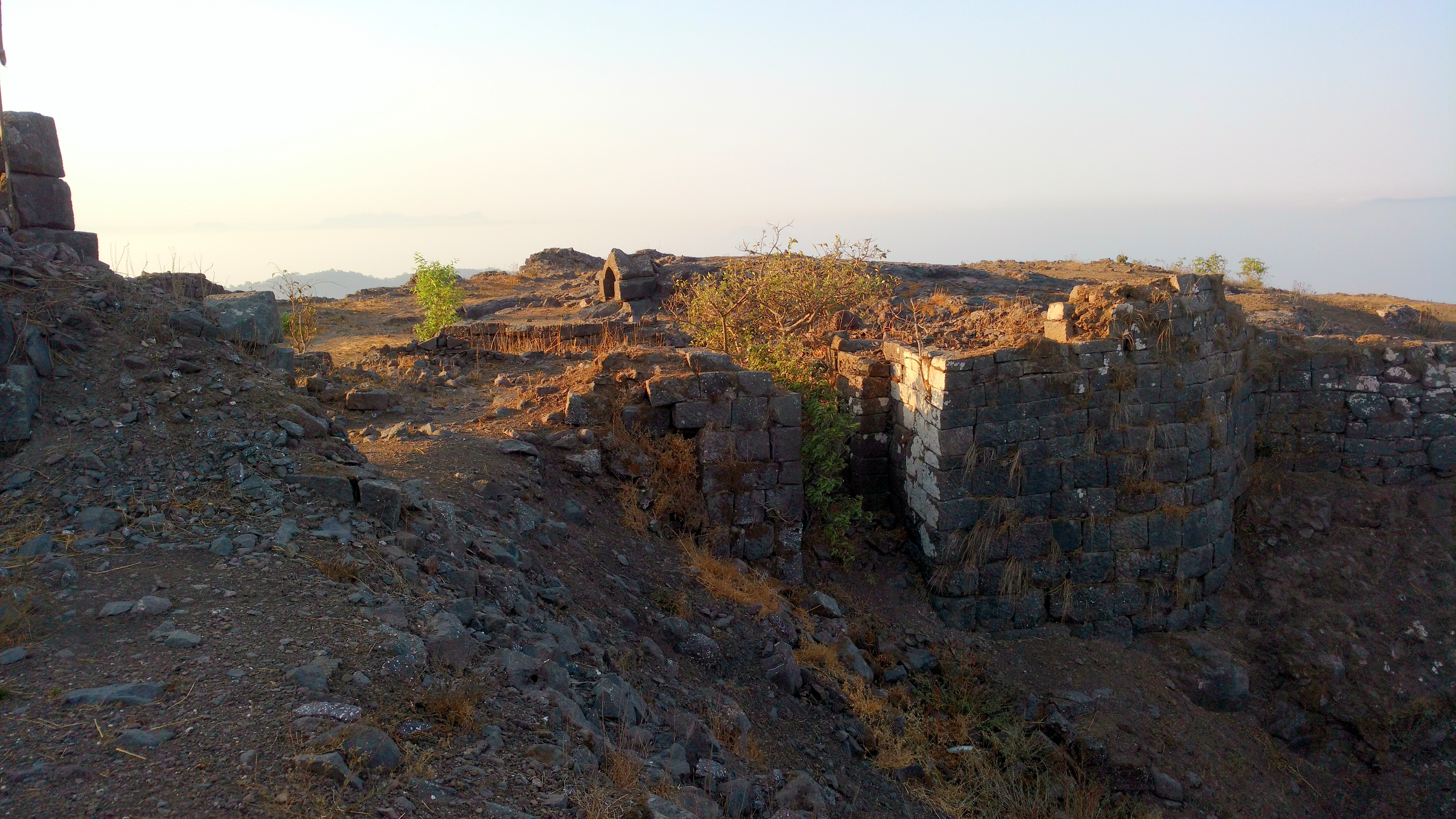
Fortification
