= Fatehgarh Fort =

Indian fort

Fatehgarh, Uttar Pradesh, India derives its name from an old fort. Fatehgarh remained a military station of considerable importance, and in 1802, it became the headquarters of the Governor General's Agent for the ceded provinces. In 1815, a gun carriage factory was established here.

== Sources ==
- Wallace, C L (1934). Fatehgarh Camp 1777-1857.
