= Kanchana Fort =

Kanchana Fort is a hill fort in the Nashik district of Maharashtra. The fort is located in the Ajantha-Saatmal Mountain range. The height of the hill in which the fort is located is 1368m or 4490 ft. Kalwan is the name of the village where the hill is situated.
