= Kamandurg Fort =

Coordinates: 19°22′57″N 72°57′23″E

Kamandurg Fort, Maharashtra, lies on Vasai-Bhiwandi Road in India. Not much is known about the fort. It can be reached by foot in approximately 3 hours from the nearby village of Devkundi.
