= Chudanga Gada =

- Location in Odisha Chudanga Gada (India)
- 20°25′16″N 85°48′25″E
- Location: Bhubaneswar, Odisha, India

Site notes
- Elevation: 30 m (98 ft)
- Architectural style: Kalingan Style (Kalinga Architecture)

Chudanga Gada, formerly known as Sarangagarh, is a fort in Odisha state of India at latitude 20°25’16" north and longitude 85°48’25" east, at an elevation of 100 feet above sea level. It is about 14 km north of Bhubaneswar in the village Baranga of Cuttack tehsil and district.
