= Bahula Fort =

- Nashik district, Maharashtra

Site information
- Type: Hill fort
- Owner: Government of India
- Open to the public: Yes
- Condition: Ruins

Location
- Shown within Maharashtra
- Coordinates: 19°52′06.4″N 73°42′14.7″E
- Height: 3165 feet

Site history
- Materials: Stone
- Demolished: 1818

Bahula fort is located in the Igatpuri taluka of Nashik district. It is located on the ancient trade route passing through Thal ghat. The fort is located near village Gulane.

== How to reach ==
The village Gaulane is located 37km from Igatpuri. Igatpuri is located on Mumbai-Nashik Railway route as well as National Highway NH 160. The fort is about 4km from the base village. It takes about one hour to reach the scarp of the hill. There are 70 rock cut steps which encircle the hill and lead to the top of the fort. There are few ruins of buildings and a water cistern at the top.

== History ==
In 1818 Captain Briggs of the East India Company captured the fort. In 1944 this fort along with adjoining area was handed over to Indian Military which they use regularly as firing range.

== See also ==
- List of forts in Maharashtra
- Nashik
