= Burail Fort =

- Chandigarh, India
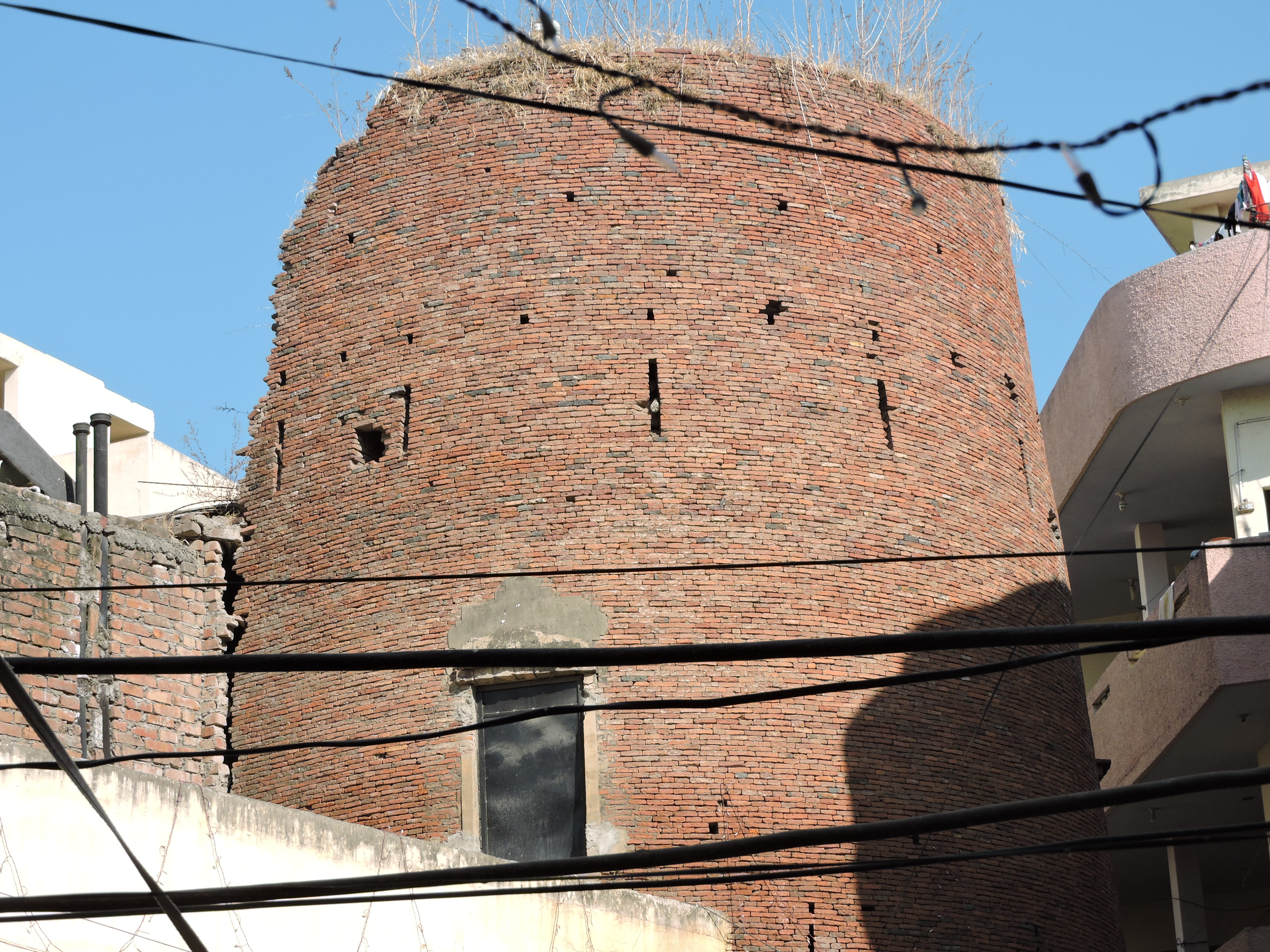
- Historical Burail Fort South East side piller

Site information
- Type: Fort
- Open to the public: Yes

Location
- India
- Location within Punjab
- Coordinates: 30°42′27″N 76°45′40″E

Site history
- Built by: Mughals
- Materials: Small Nanakshahi bricks
- Battles/wars: Sikh Khalsa Army of Banda Singh Bahadur with Mughal Faujdar
- Events: 1712

Burail Fort is a fort situated in Burail, Sector 45 of Chandigarh, India. It was built during the Mughal period. It remained under the control of the Mughal Faujdar up till 1712 CE. Banda Singh sent the Khalsa Army which captured the fort and killed the Faujdar.

== Gallery ==
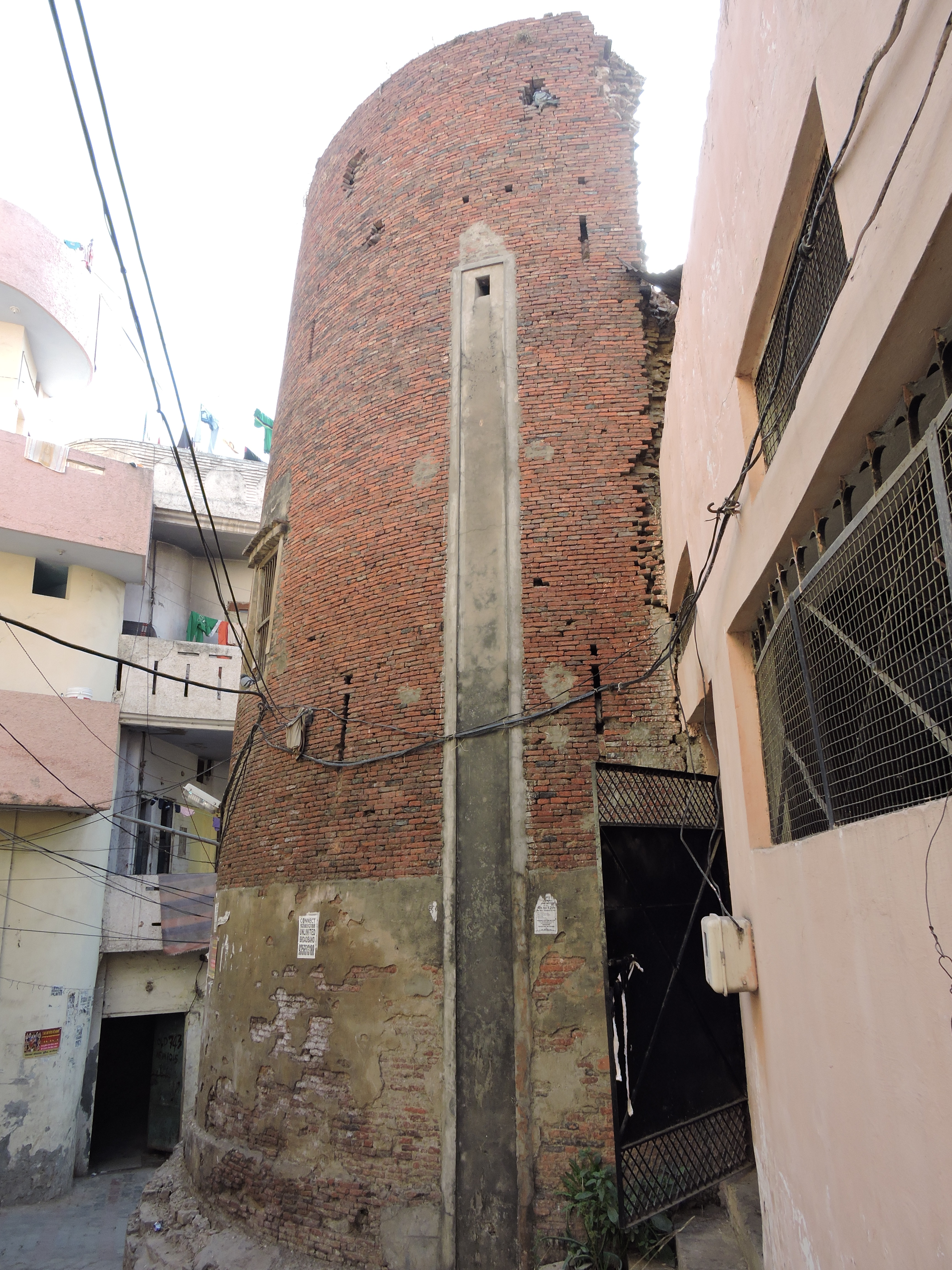
Northeast side pillar

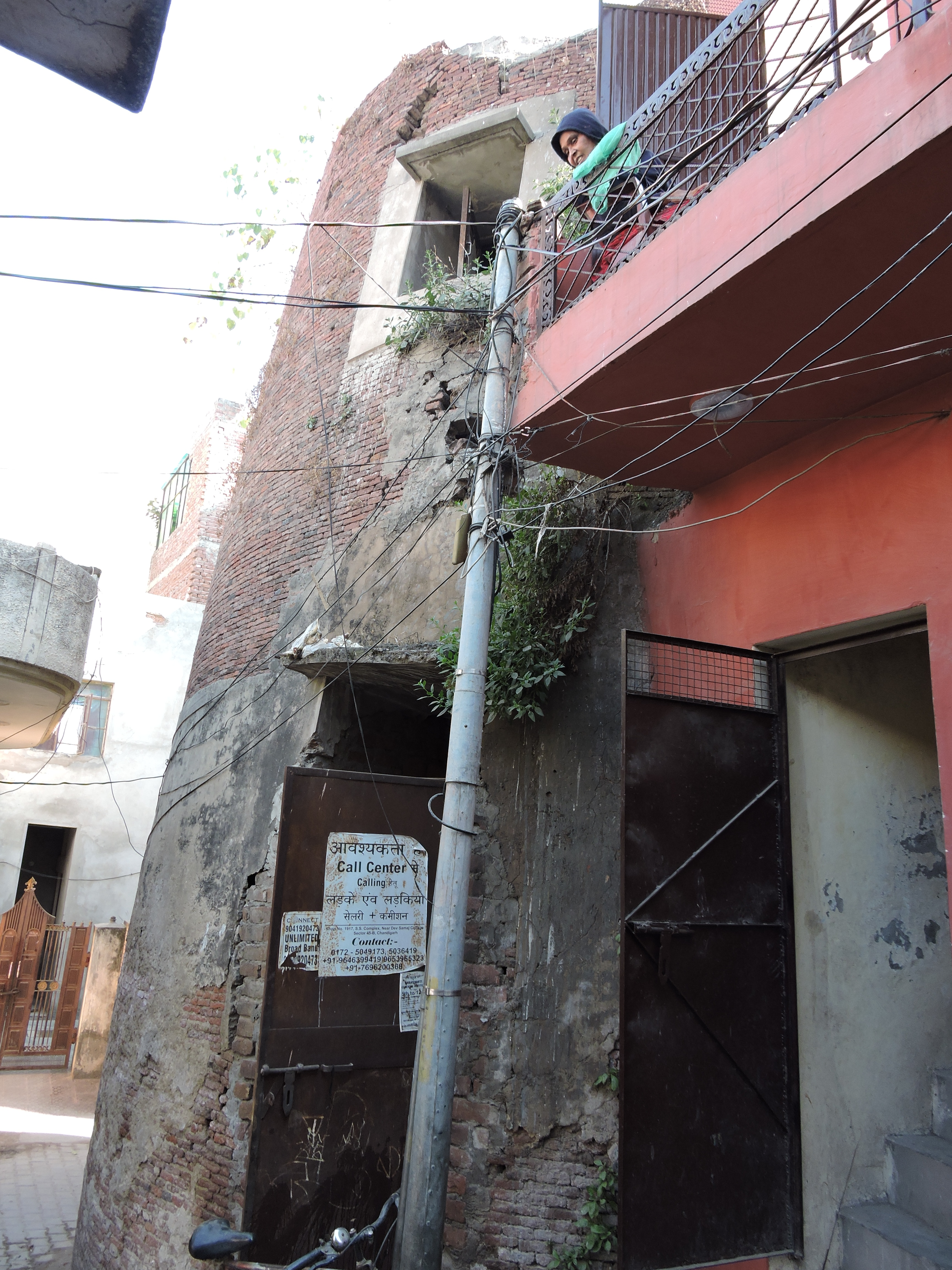
Northwest side pillar

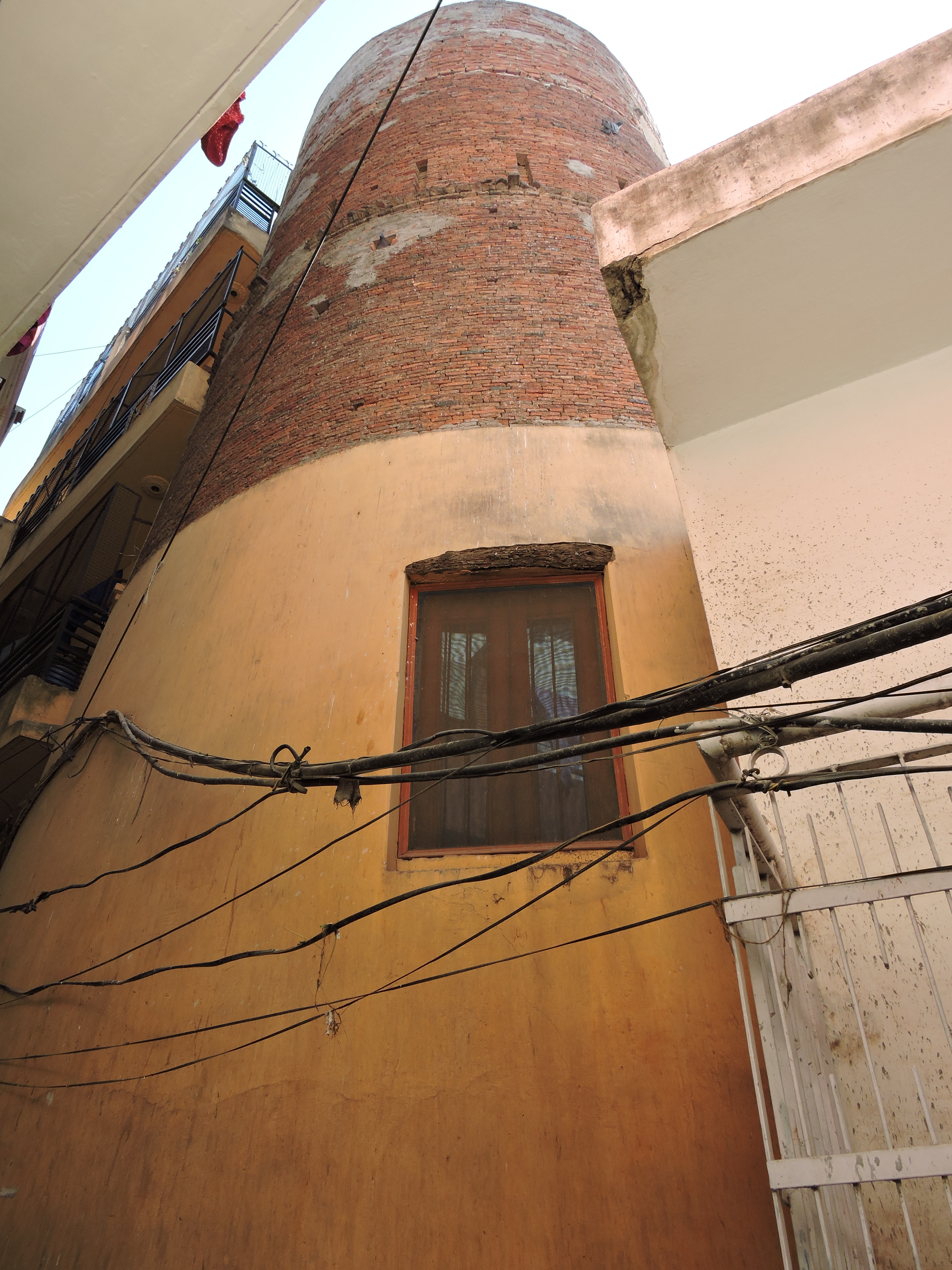
Southwest side pillar

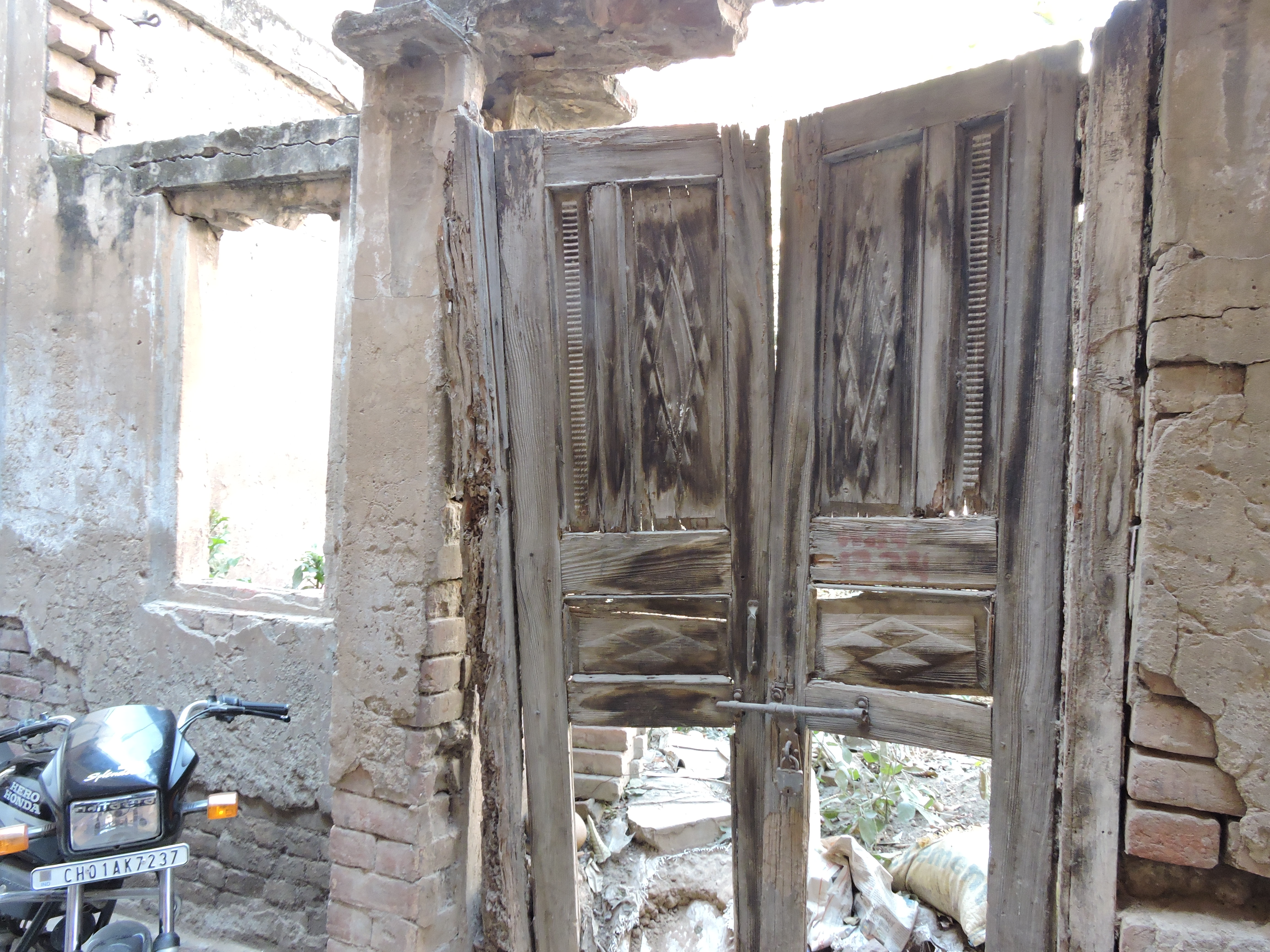
Ruined gate

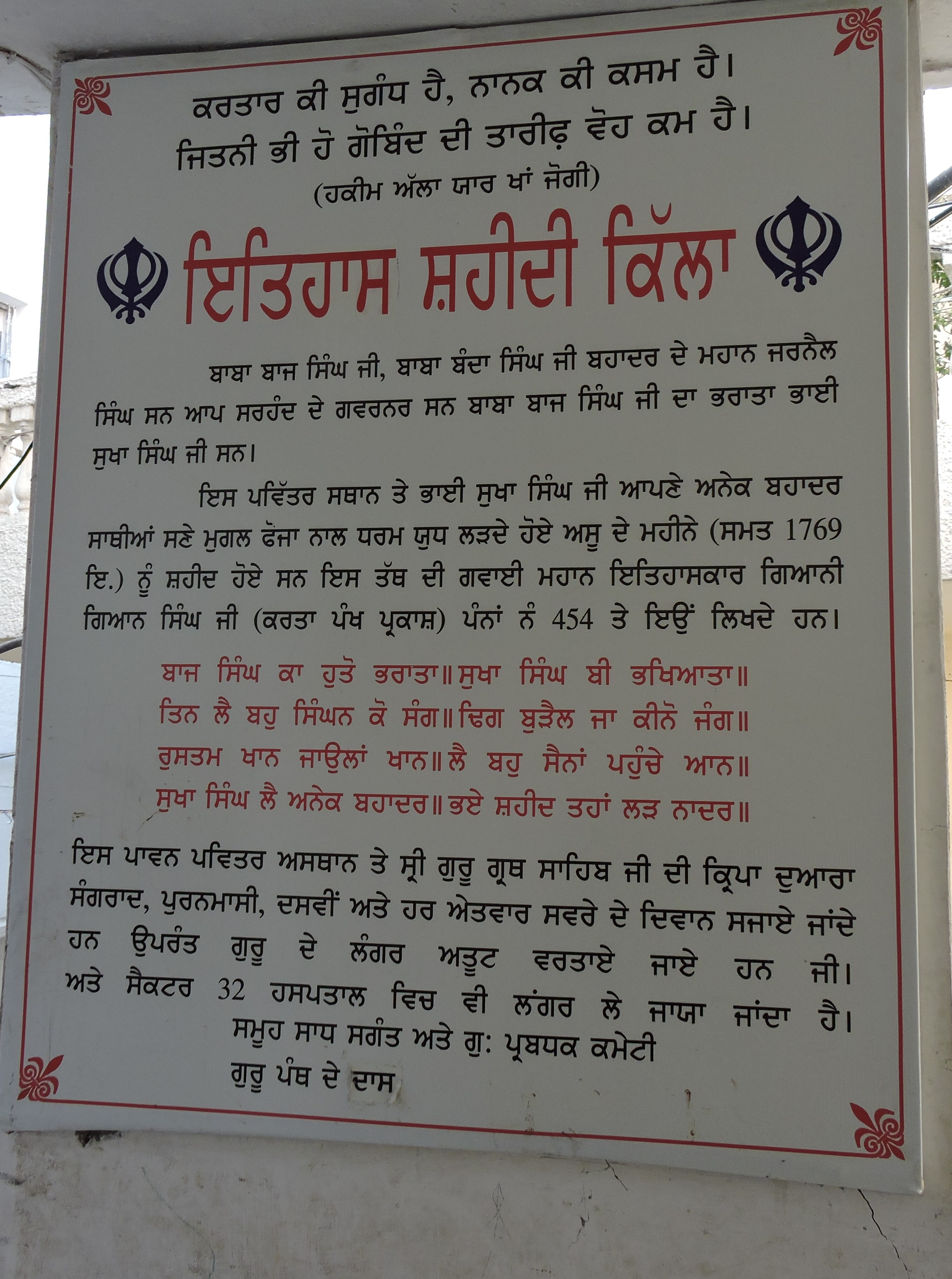
Brief history of the fort in the Punjabi language
