= Kankwadi =

- village
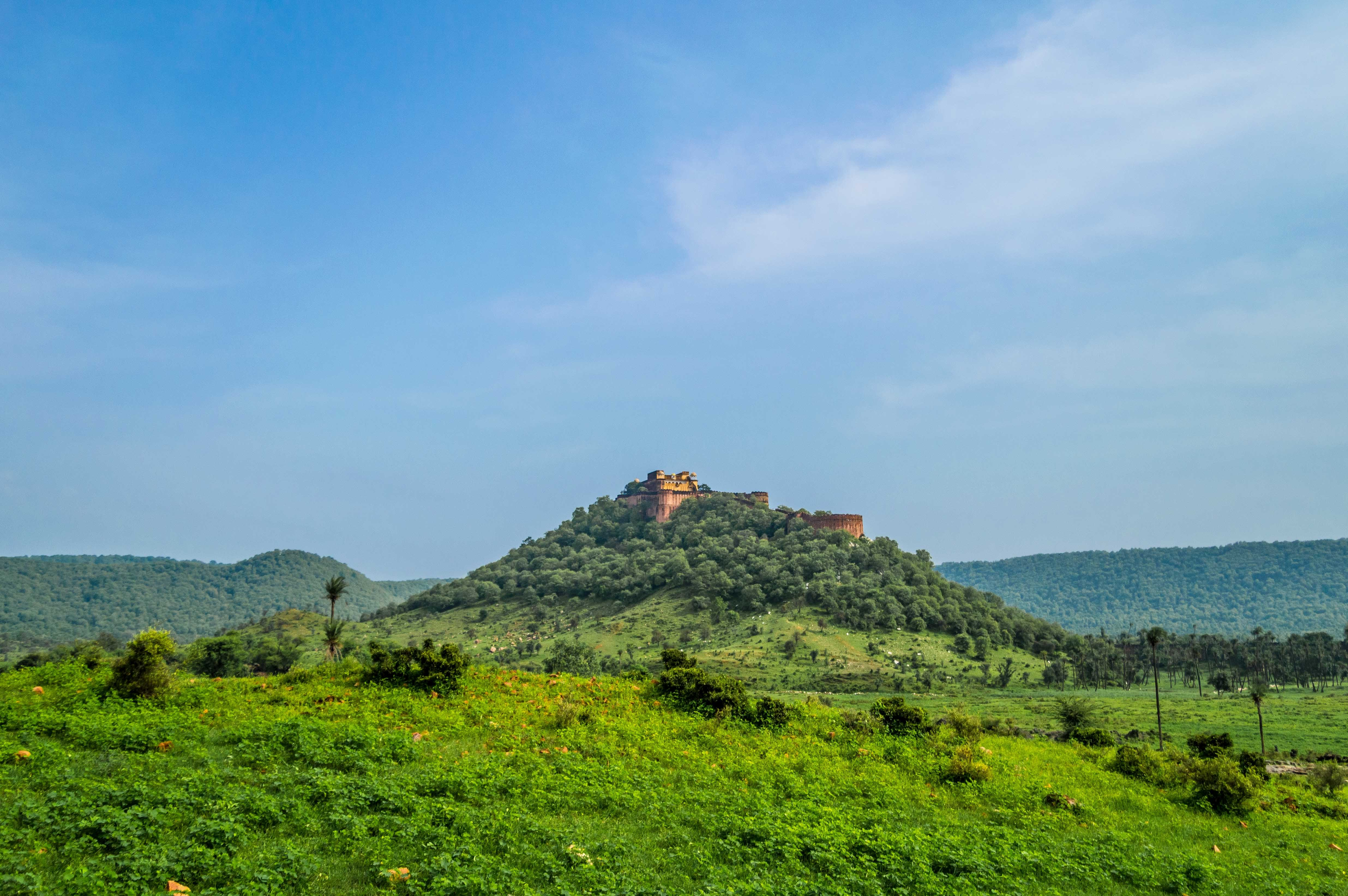
- Kankwari Fort in the middle of Sariska Tiger Reserve.

- Location in Rajasthan, India
- Coordinates: 27°14′24″N 76°24′29″E
- Country: India
- State: Rajasthan
- District: Alwar

Government
  - Body: Gram panchayat

Languages
  - Official: Hindi
- Time zone: UTC+5:30 (IST)

Kankwadi or Kankwari is the site of Kankwadi fort and village, located in the Sariska Tiger Reserve in Alwar district.

The fort was founded by Jai Singh II as a famine work. A palace was built by Pratap Singh Prabhakar

The village was evicted in 2009, but renovation works in the fort are going on to promote tourism. As of August 2016, only three families reside in the village below the fort, but their migration is in progress by the government.

The fort remains open from October to July end throughout the year and anyone can visit it after renting a Safari Jeep from the Forest Office.
