= Anchettidurgam =

Coordinates: 12.590°N 77.890°E

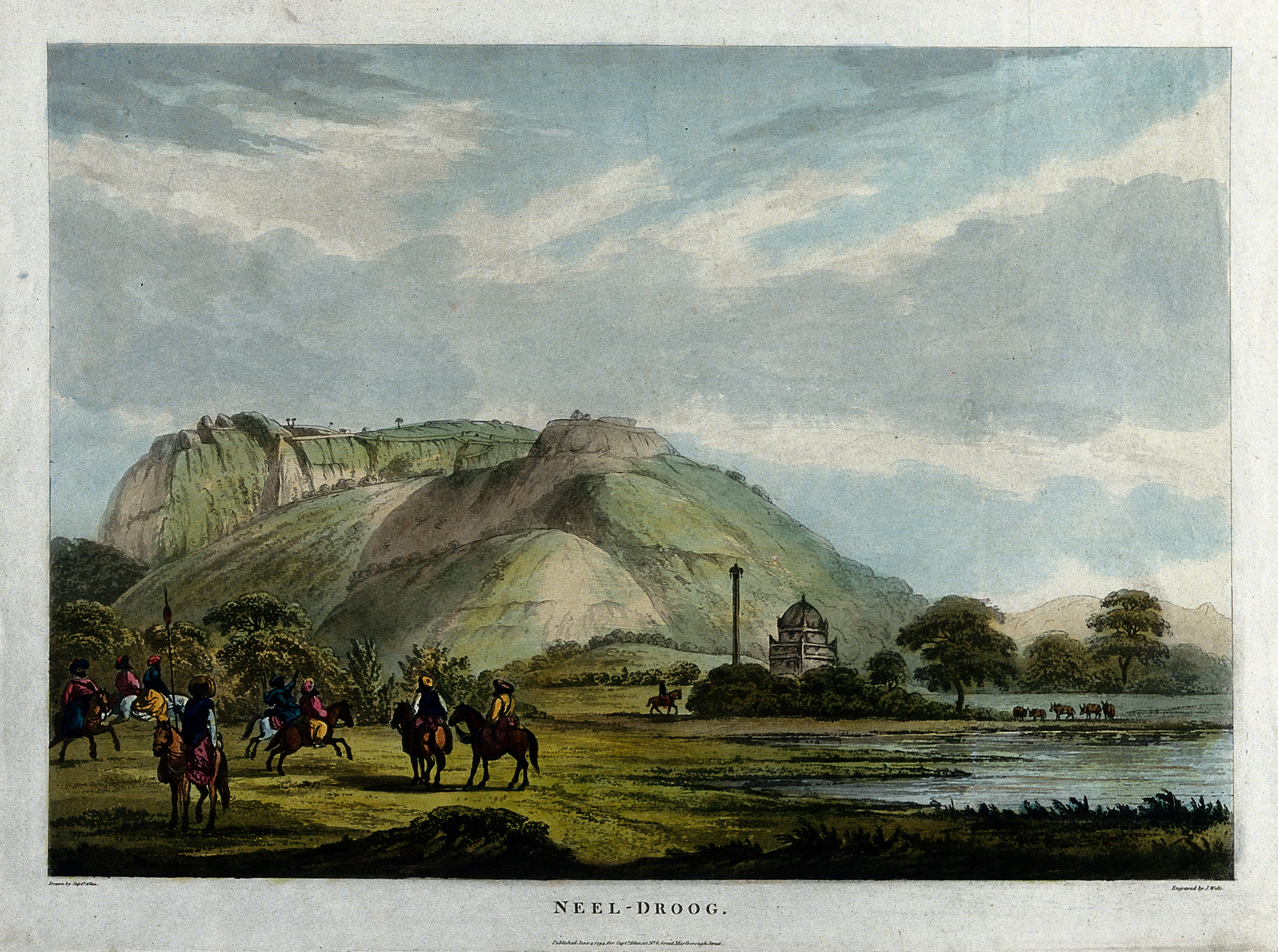
Neel-Droog, as drawn by Alexander Allan

Anchettidurgam or Anchetty Durgam is a fort in the present day Krishnagiri district in Tamil Nadu. It was also spelled as anchittidrug, anchitty droog because of the British pronunciation and writing style. Durg or durgam means fort. It was one of the 12 forts of barahmahal. In the 18th century the fort was under the rule of Hyder Ali and Tipu Sultan. The fort was captured by the British in July 1791.

== Gallery ==
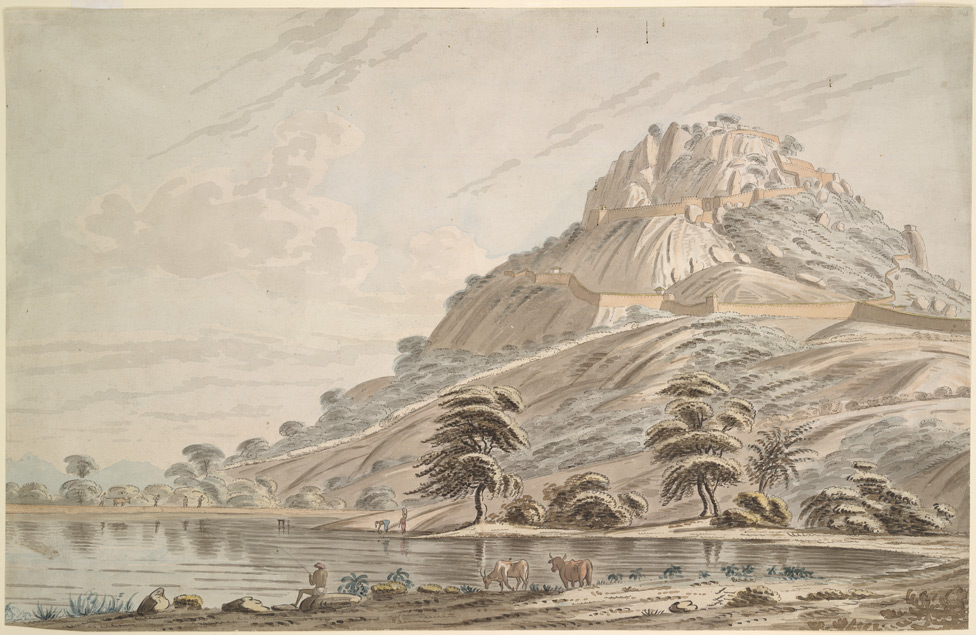

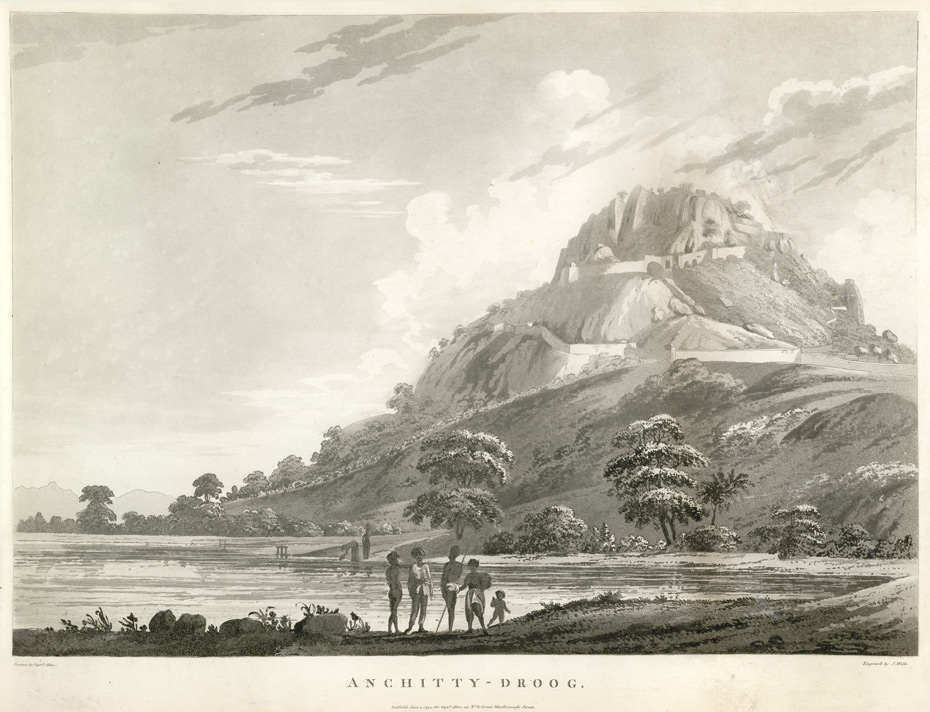

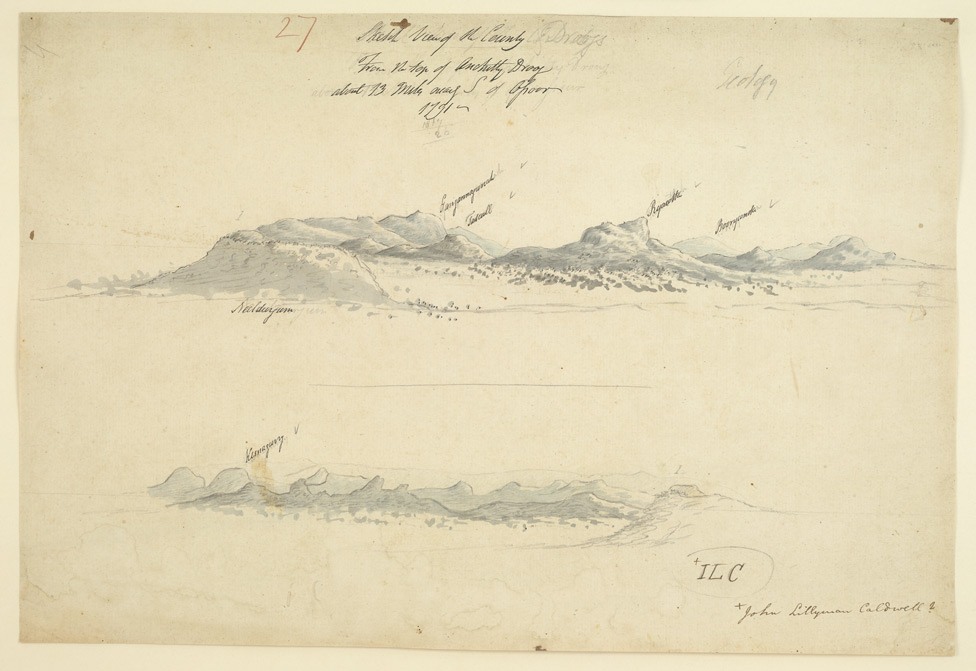
