= Garchuk Lachit Garh =

Fort in Assam, India

Coordinates: 26.10560°N 91.70951°E

- Part of Assam
- Guwahati, Assam, India
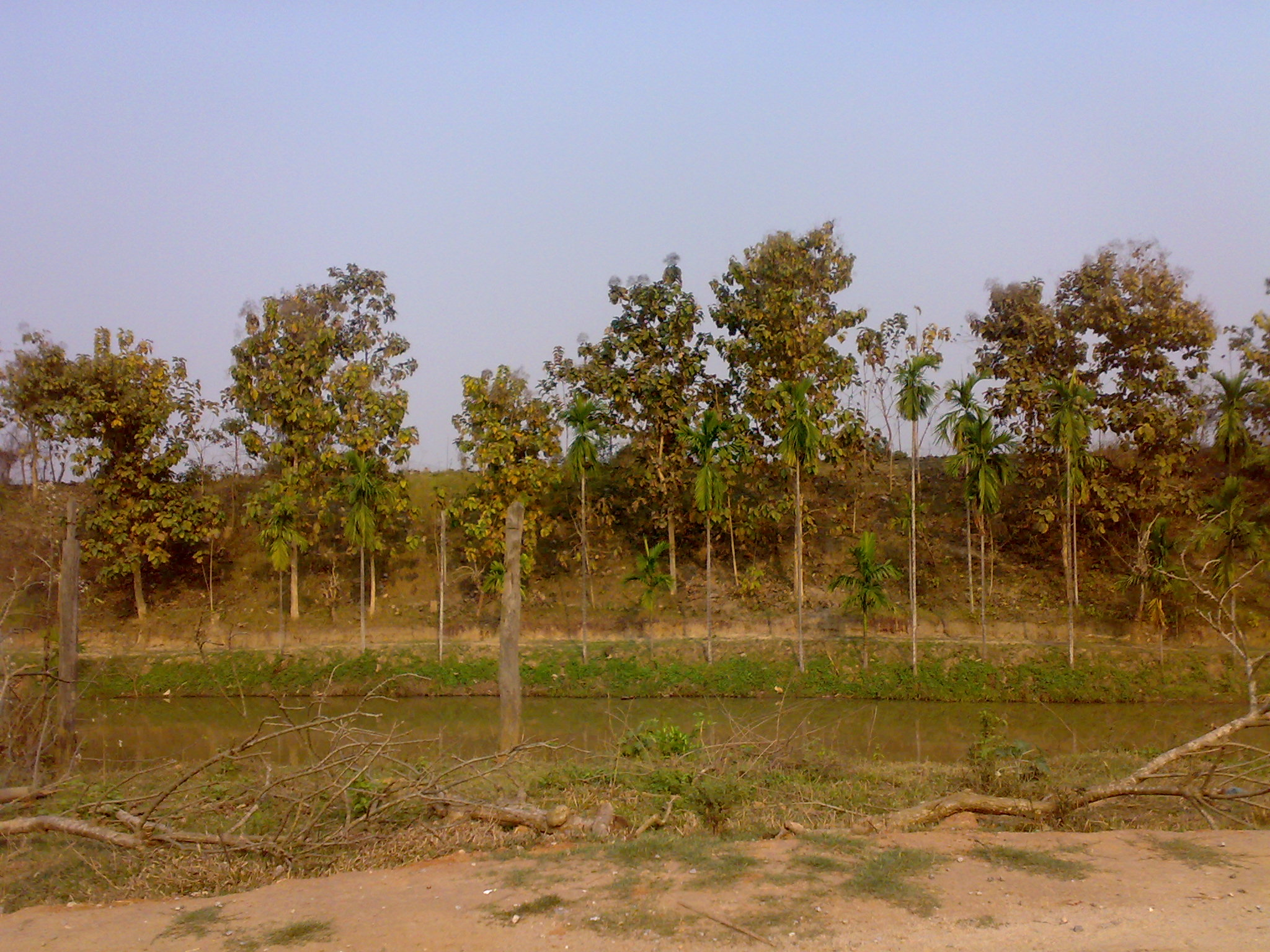
- Garchuk fort, Guwahati

Site information
- Type: Rampart
- Controlled by: Government of Assam
- Condition: Ruins

Site history
- Built: 1669
- Built by: Ahom kingdom
- Materials: Granite Stones and lime mortar
- Battles/wars: Ahom–Mughal conflicts

Garchuk Lachit Garh (meaning 'fort' in Assamese) or Fort, now popularly known as Lachit Garh, is located in northeastern India in the southwestern part of Guwahati city to the west of Ahomgaon. The fort was constructed under the Ahom kingdom during the times of Lachit Borphukan around the year 1669-70 CE, and stretches from the northern Fatasil hills at Garchuk locality cutting across the National Highway (N.H.)-37 at Garchuk Charali to the southern hills via Pamahi and Moinakhurung. The length of the fortification is about 3 km.

The fortification was built around 1669 C.E. to deter the invading Mughal cavalry with two earthen ramparts and two water filled lakes in between and ditches dug in front, which can be seen by visitors. But illegal encroachment has taken its toll on this heritage site.

This medieval Gath with the road was known as Asurar Ali, which has now become the Pamohi Road.

In the book Lachit Borphukan and his Times, 1st Edition 1947, by Rai Bahadur S. K. Bhuyan translated from Tai-Ahom Buranji, there is account of the Assamese Plan of Defence. "Bethabar Hazarika Lekai Chetia, son of Lechai Kari from Gotanagar to Fatasil with 60 chor-bachas. Neog Gohain from Fatasil to the head of Asurar Ali with 60 chor-bachas. Hatrai Kaliabaria of the Borgohain family on Asurar Ali with 100 chor-bachas. Lahman Marangi-khowa Chetia of Borgohain family on the hill situated on the South of Asurar Ali with 100 chor-bachas".

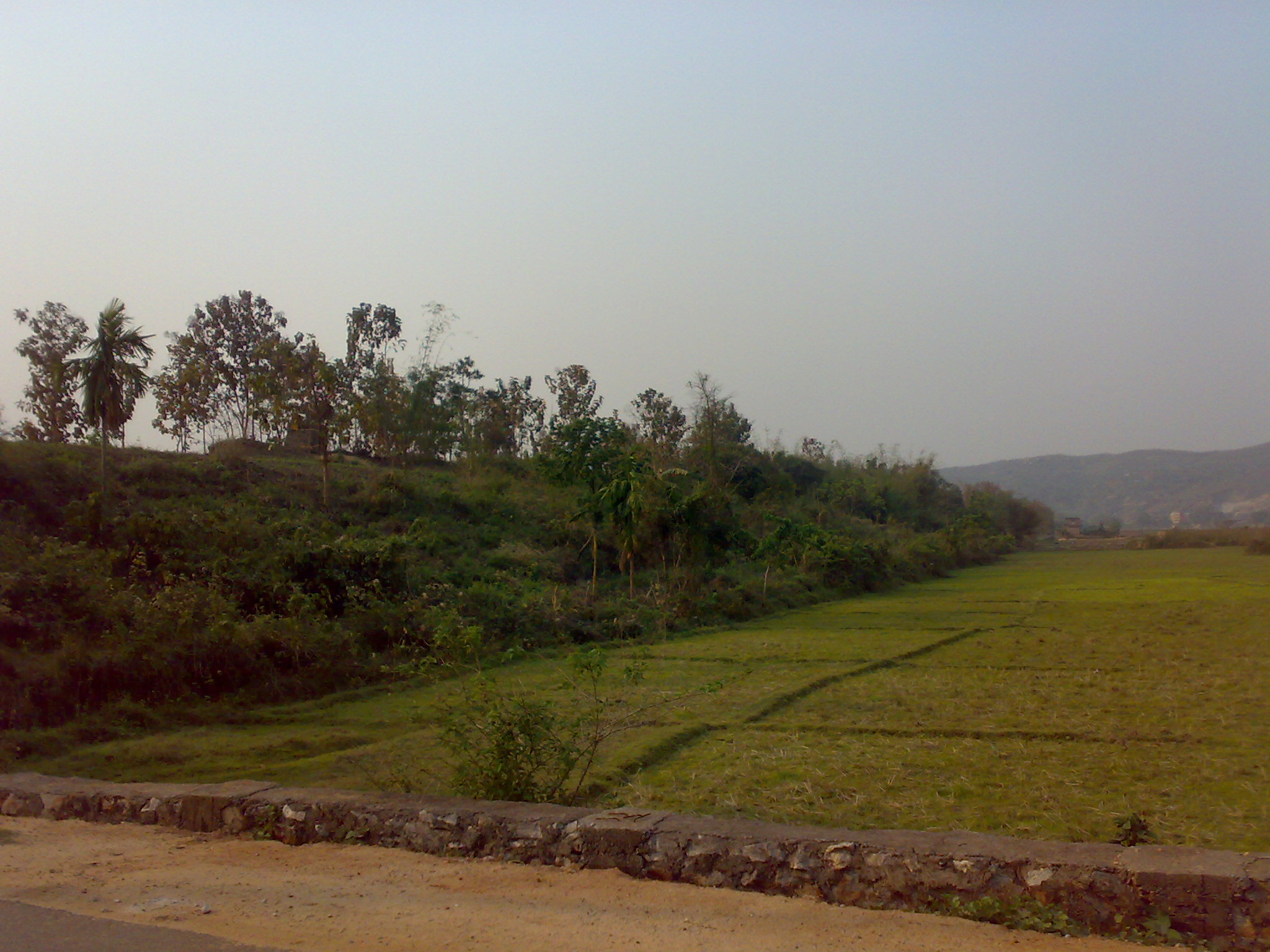
Garchuk fort, Guwahati

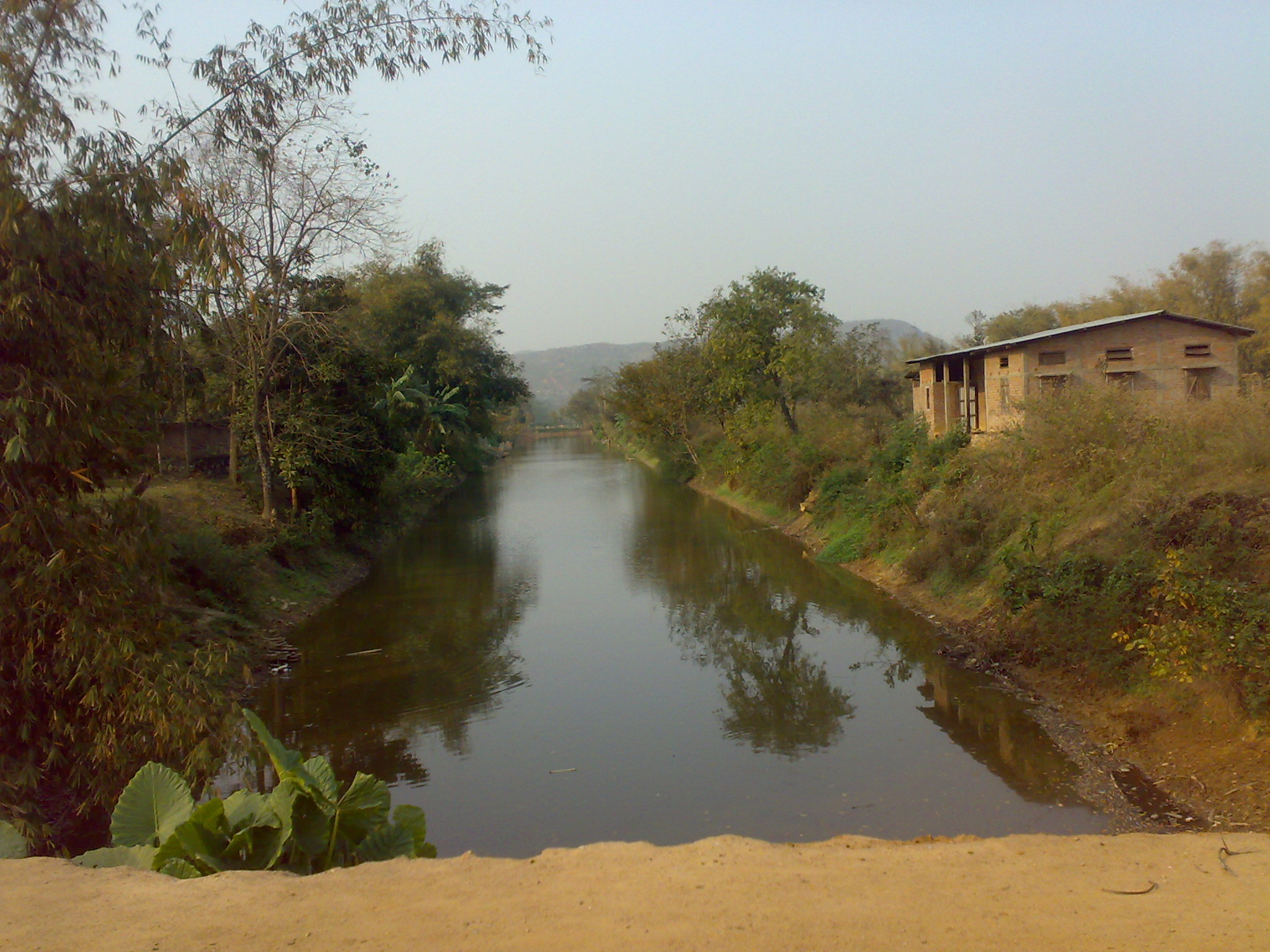
Garchuk fort, Guwahati

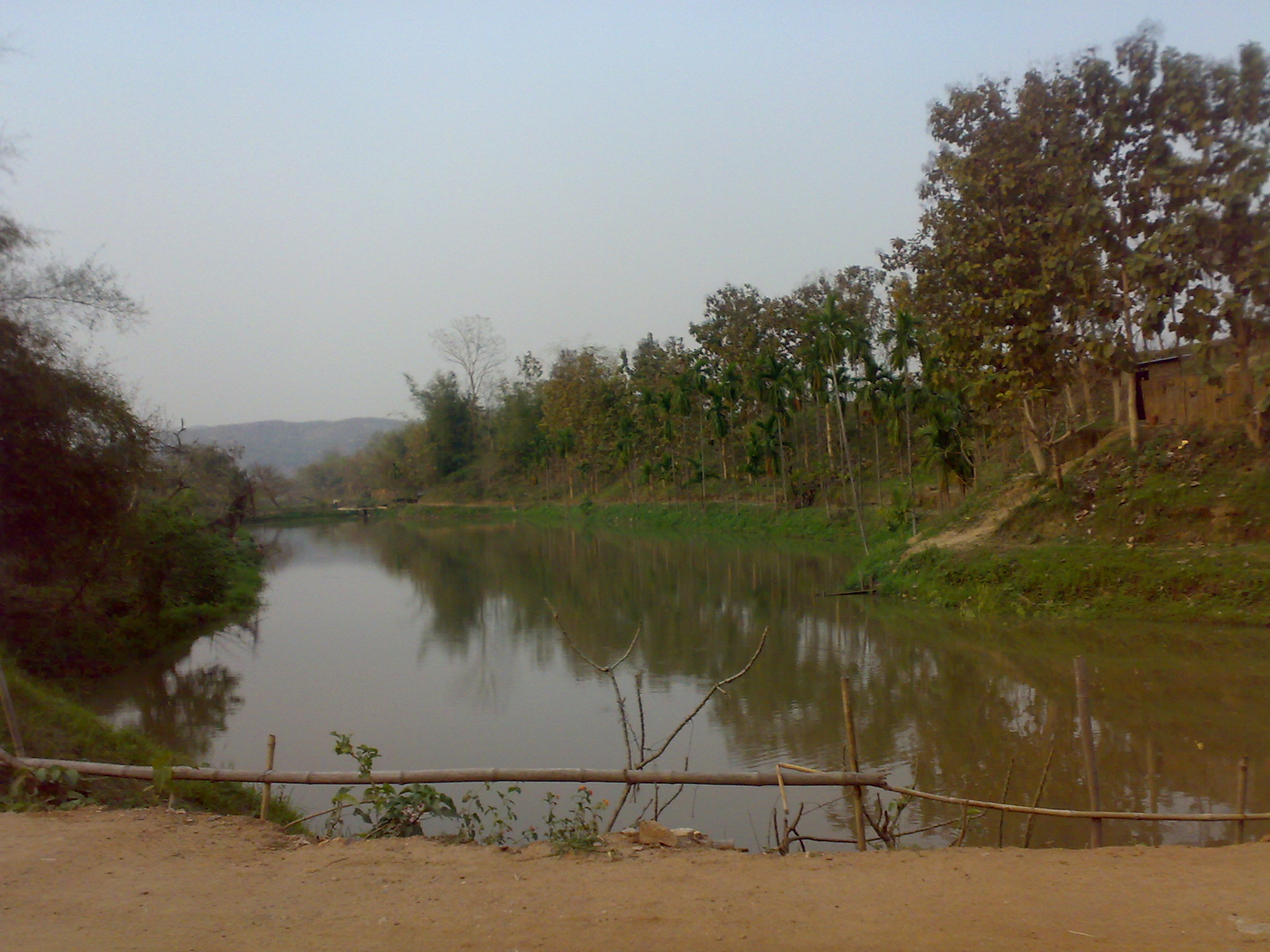
Garchuk fort, Guwahati

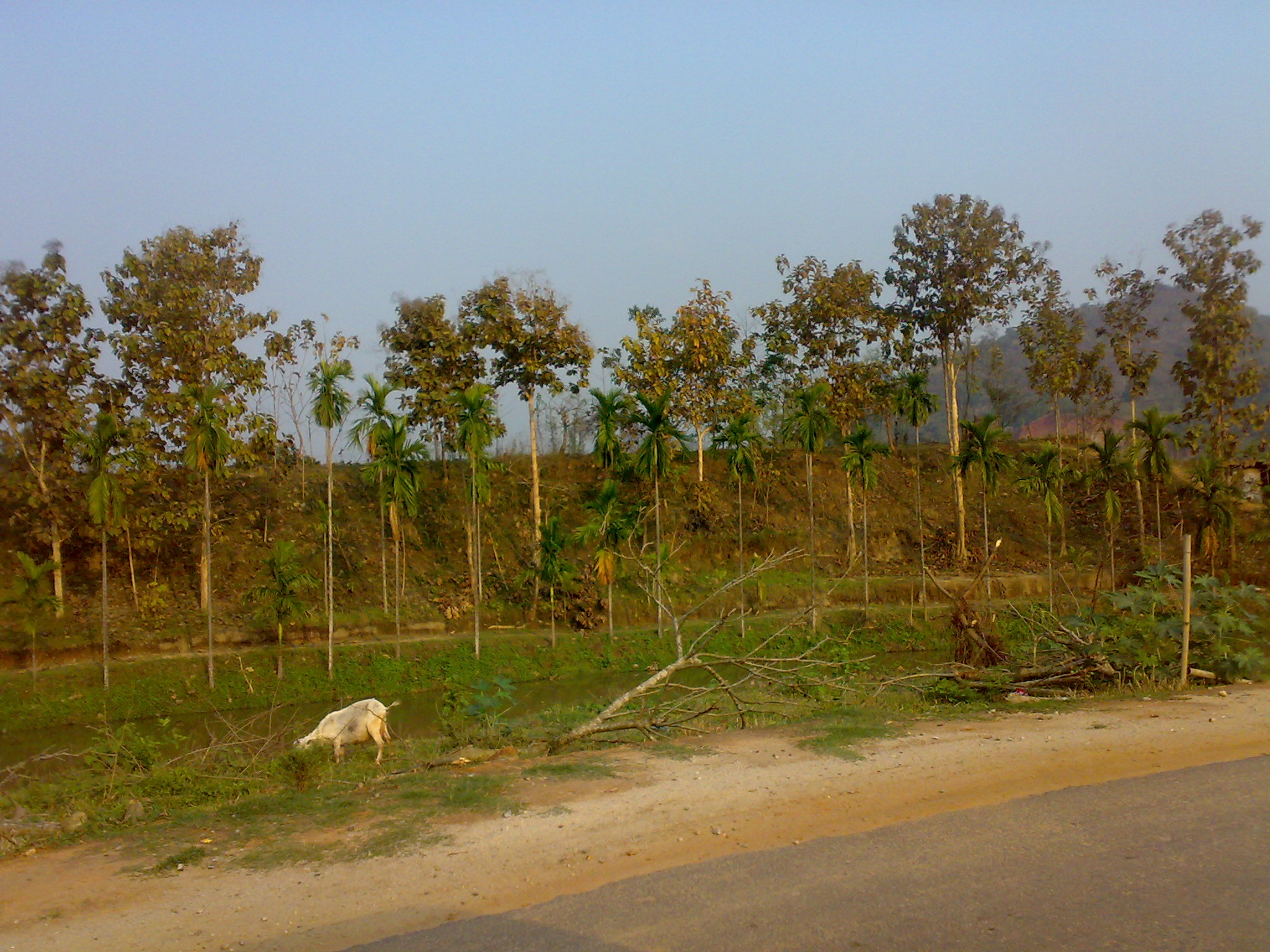
Garchuk fort, Guwahati
