= Ambolgad =

Village in Maharashtra

- Village
- Interactive map of Ambolgad
- Coordinates: 16.644°N 73.331°E
- Country: India
- State: Maharashtra

Ambolgad is a village near Jaitapur Nuclear Power Project in the Ratnagiri district in Maharashtra, India. Ambolgad has very scenic beach in Ratnagiri near Nate. There is one School for Primary education and no institutions for higher education.There is one Gagangiri Maharaj ashram.
