= Tungi fort =

Tungi Fort
- तुंगी किल्ला
- Part of Sahyadri Hill Range
- Raigad district, Maharashtra

Site information
- Type: Hill fort
- Owner: IndiaGovernment of India
- Controlled by: Maratha Empire (1739-1818); United Kingdom: East India Company (1818-1857); British Raj (1857-1947); India (1947-)
- Open to the public: Yes
- Condition: Ruins

Location
- Shown within Maharashtra
- Coordinates: 19°02′32.9″N 73°29′24″E
- Height: 4490 Ft.

Site history
- Materials: Stone

Tungi fort (Marathi: तुंगी किल्ला) is a small 16th-century fort probably mainly used as a lookout post in the past. It is situated to the east of Karjat in the Indian state of Maharashtra. It is one of the easy-to-reach forts near the Bhimashanker trek route in the Karjat area.

== History ==
Little history about this fort is known. The locals say that this is not actually a fort but a lookout station from where any movement of troops along the Ganapati Ghat road could be seen.

== Access ==
The base village is Khandas which is 31 km from Karjat. Karjat is well connected by road and railway from Mumbai and Pune. The starting point for the trek is Khandas village. The path to the south of the village leads to the fort.

== See also ==
- List of forts in Maharashtra
- Marathi People
- List of Maratha dynasties and states
- Maratha War of Independence
