= Chennampalli Fort =

Medieval fort in Andhra Pradesh, India

Coordinates: 15°18′09″N 77°35′40″E

Chennampalli Fort is a medieval fort in Tuggali mandal, Kurnool district, Andhra Pradesh, India. It is rumored that gold and other valuables were buried in the fort during the 17th century. Government officials from the Department of Mines & Geology undertook excavations in the fort during 2017–18. Skeletal remains of elephants and horses were found during the excavations.
