= List of forts in Maharashtra =

The mountainous districts of Western Maharashtra are dotted with the ruins of hundreds of mountain forts mainly from the Deccan sultanates and the Maratha Empire eras. Some such as Daulatabad fort are even older. These forts and the surrounding hills are popular among people interested in trekking, hiking, and heritage tourism related to the life and times of Shivaji Maharaj, the founder of the Maratha Empire. Notable forts popular with tourists include Shivneri Fort, Rajgad, Sinhagad, Raigad Fort, and Pratapgad. A group of 11 such forts in Maharashtra along with one fort in Tamil Nadu, officially called the Maratha Military Landscapes of India, were recognised as a UNESCO World Heritage Site in the year 2025.

Many, if not most of these forts were destroyed by the British after they defeated the Maratha empire. In order to stop the defeated Maratha forces from regrouping by taking refuge in the mountain forts, the then British governor of Bombay Presidency, Mountstuart Elphinstone ordered most of these forts to be demolished, and all that remains today is ruins.

Image	Forts
	Ahmednagar Fort
	Ajobagad Fort
	Ajinkyatara
	Akluj Fort
	Akola Fort
	Alang Fort
	Ambolgad Fort
	Anjaneri Fort
	Anjanvel Fort
	Ankai Fort
	Antur Fort
	Arnala fort
	Asava Fort
	Asheri Fort
	Avandha Fort
	Avchitgad
	Bahadur Fort
	Balapur Fort
	Ballarpur Fort
	Bankot fort
	Belapur Fort
	Bhagwantgad
	Bhairavgad (Moroshi)
	Bhairavgad (Shirpunje)
	Bhairavgad (Kothale)
	Bhairavgad (Mandave)
	Bhamer
	Bharatgad
	Bhaskargad
	Bhawangad Fort
	Bhivgad Fort
	Bhorgiri fort
	Bhudargad
	Bhupatgad Fort
	Bhushangad
	Birwadi fort
	Bitangad
	Bombay Castle
	Castella de Aguada
	Chanda Fort
	Chandan Fort
	Chandragad Fort
	Chandwad fort
	Chauler Fort
	Chavand
	Dategad
	Dativare fort
	Daulatabad Fort
	Dermal Fort
Devgad_fort	Devgad fort
	Dhak Bahiri
	Dhawalgad
	Dhodap
	Dhunda fort
	Dongri Fort
	Dronagiri Fort
	Dubergad
	Durgabhandar
	Durgadi Fort
	Fattegad
	Fort George
	Gagangad
	Galna Fort
	Gambhirgad
	Gawilghur
	Ghangad
	Ghargad
	Ghodbunder Fort
	Ghosalegad Fort
	Goa Fort
	Gondhanapur
	Gopalgad
	Gorakhgad
	Gowalkot
	Gumtara Fort
	Hadsar
	Hargad Fort
	Harihar fort
	Harishchandragad
	Hatgadh Fort
	Indori fort
	Indrai fort
	Irshalgad
	Fort Jadhavgadh
	Jaigad Fort

- Jamgaon Fort
- Jamner Fort
- Jangali Jayagad, Janjira fort (Raigad)
- Javlya fort
- Jivdhan
- Kaladgad
- Kalanandigad
- Kalavantin Durg
- Kaldurg Fort
- Kalyangad/ Nandgiri
- Kamalgad
- Kamandurg Fort
- Kandhar Fort
- Kanchana Fort
- Kanhera Fort (Chalisgaon), (Jalgaon)
- Kankrala
- Karnala Fort
- Kavnai fort
- Kelve Fort
- Kenjalgad
- Khanderi
- Kharda / Shivpattan Fort
- Kohoj Fort
- Kolaba Fort
- Koldher Fort
- Konkan Diva Fort
- Korigad
- Korlai Fort
- Kothaligad / Bhairavgad (Kothali)
- Kulang Fort
- Kunjargad
- Kurdugad
- Laling fort
- Lingana
- Lohagad
- Machindragad
- Machnur Fort
- Madangad Fort
- Madh Fort
- Mahim Fort
- Mahimangad
- Mahipalgad
- Mahipatgad
- Mahuli
- Mahur Fort
- Mailagad Fort (Buldhana district)
- Makrandgad
- Malanggad
- Malegaon fort
- Malhargad/Sonori Fort
- Manaranjan Fort
- Mandangad fort
- Mangad Fort/Fort Mangad
- Mangalgad/ Kangori fort
- Mangi-Tungi
- Manikgad (Chandrapur)
- Manikgad (Raigad)
- Manjarsubha Fort
- Mankigad fort
- Manohargad-Mansantoshgad
- Markanda Fort
- Mazagon Fort
- Metghar Fort, Nashik
- Mohandar fort/Shidka fort
- Mohangad
- Mora fort
- Morgiri Fort
- Mrugagad
- Mulher
- Naldurg Fort
- Nanded fort
- Nandoshi fort
- Narayangad
- Narnala
- Narsimhagad
- Nhavigad
- Nimgiri-Hanumantgad fort
- Nivati fort
- Pabargad
- Padargad
- Padmadurg
- Padmdurang fort
- Palashi Fort
- Palgad
- Pandavgad
- Panhala Fort
- Paranda Fort
- Pargadh
- Parola Fort
- Patta Fort
- Pavangad
- Pemgiri Fort/ Shahagad
- Pimpalgaon Raja Fort, (Buldhana)
- Pimpaldoh Fort, (Buldhana)
- Pisola fort
- Prabalgad
- Prachitgad
- Pratapgad
- Purandar fort
- Purnagad
- Raigad Fort
- Raireshwar
- Rajgad Fort
- Rajdher fort
- Ramshej fort
- Ramtek
- Rangana Fort
- Rasalgad
- Ratandurg fort
- Ratangad
- Ratnagiri
- Ravlya Fort
- Revdanda fort
- Riwa Fort
- Rohida fort
- Sagargad
- Sajjangad
- Sakharkherda Fort, (Buldhana)
- Sakshigad
- Salher
- Salota fort
- Samangad
- Sangram Durg
- Santoshgad
- Sarasgad
- Sarjekot fort
- Sewri Fort
- Shaniwar Wada
- Shirgaon Fort
- Shivgad
- Shivneri
- Shrivardhan Fort
- Siddhagad
- Sindhudurg Fort
- Saurabh Fort
- Sinhagad
- Sion Hillock Fort
- Sitabuldi Fort
- Solapur Fort (Solapur)
- Sondai fort
- Songir
- Songiri
- Sudhagad
- Sumargad
- Surgad
- Suvarnadurg
- Tailbaila fort
- Takmak fort
- Talagad
- Tandulwadi fort
- Tankai fort
- Tarapur fort
- Terekhol Fort
- Thalner
- Tikona
- Tipagad (Gadchiroli)
- Torna Fort
- Tringalwadi
- Trymbakgad
- Tung Fort
- Udgir Fort
- Underi
- Vaghera Fort
- Vairagad Fort
- Vairatgad Fort
- Vajragad
- Vandan Fort (Satara)
- Vardhangad Fort
- Varugad
- Vasai Fort/Bassein Fort
- Vasantgad
- Vasota Fort/Vyaghragad
- Vijaydurg Fort
- Vijaygad Fort
- Vikatgad
- Virathan Fort
- Visapur Fort
- Vishalgad/Khelna Fort
- Worli Fort
- Yashwantgad Fort

== See also ==
- List of forts in India
