= Mansantoshgad =

- मनोहरगड -मनसंतोषगड,शिवापूर
- Part of Sahyadri Hill Range
- Sindhudurg district, Maharashtra

Site information
- Type: Hill fort
- Owner: Government of India
- Controlled by: Maratha Empire (1667-1818); United Kingdom: East India Company (1844-1857); British Raj (1857-1947); India (1947-)
- Open to the public: Yes
- Condition: Ruins

Location
- Shown within Maharashtra Mansantoshgad (India)
- Coordinates: 16°03′01.4″N 73°58′11.9″E
- Height: 3880 Ft.

Site history
- Materials: Stone

Manohargad-Mansantoshgad Fort (Marathi: मनोहरगड -मनसंतोषगड) are two adjacent forts located on the same hill but separated by a saddle. This fort is situated at Shivapur, Tal - Kudal. The forts are 33 km from Sawantwadi and the same distance from Kudal Sindhudurg district of Maharashtra. The forts are situated on the hill north of the base village Shivapur.The fort is located in the proximity of the Amboli hill station.

== History ==
It is believed that this fort was built or repaired by Shivaji Maharaj. Shivaji Maharaj entered this area on 11 April 1667 to lift the siege of Rangana fort. After lifting the siege of Rangana fort, he arrived to Mansantoshgad on 13 May 1667. He stayed here for 34 days till June 15, 1667. Later, the control of Manohar-Mansantosh fort passed to the Chhatrapati of Kolhapur. In 1834, the fort garrison (gadkar) revolted against the Chatrapati which was again demolished by sending a chieftain. later due to regular cases of mutiny, Ch. Shahaji Maharaj (Buwa Maharaj) himself captured the fort on1936, it is recorded that he arrested the culprits and took back 2 guns from the fort. After the death of Ch. Shahaji Maharaj (Buwa Maharaj) in 1838, the gadkars again revolted against the fort, The then Chhatrapati sent his chiefs to break it, he suppressed the rebellion and gave asylum to the rebels. In the rebellion against the British in 1844, Manohar-Mansantosh fort brought the British to knees. Fonda Sawant Tambulkar, the mastermind of this rebellion, kidnapped Yuvraj Anasaheb of Sawantwadi Sansthan from the palace of Sawantwadi and brought him to this fort and recovered ransome from the surrounding area in his name. The rebels also started their own ammunition factory in the vicinity of Manohar fort. The goods were sent to the forts like Samangad, Rangana etc. to fight against the British Army. Due to all these incidents, the British sent General Della Monty and Colonel Autram to quell the revolt at Manohar Fort. The fort walls were shattered by the bullets fired by them. On January 26, 1845, the rebels fled the fort. The British demolished the steps of Manohar-Mansantoshgad fort.

== How to reach ==
The nearest town is Kudal and Sawantwadi. The base village of the fort is Shivapur, but there is a motorable road up to Gadkarwadi. From Bhairav mandir it will take 45 minutes almost to climb. There are good hotels at kudal and Sawantwadi. Sawantwadi and Kudal both are well connected rail to Mumbai and Goa.The trek route passes through dense forest and the ascent is very steep. It requires about 1 hour to reach the scarp. There are dialapedeted rock cut steps to climb the scarp. The night stay on the fort is not possible.

== Places to see ==
The manohargad is triangular in shape and larger in size than Mansantoshgad.It is 15 acres in size. The fort walls are in demolished condition .There is a well, entrance gate and few buildings in ruined condition on the fort.

== See also ==
- List of forts in Maharashtra
- List of forts in India
- Marathi People
- List of Maratha dynasties and states
- Maratha Army
- Maratha titles
- Military history of India
