= Bhushangad =

Hill fort in Maharashtra, India

- Satara district, Maharashtra, India
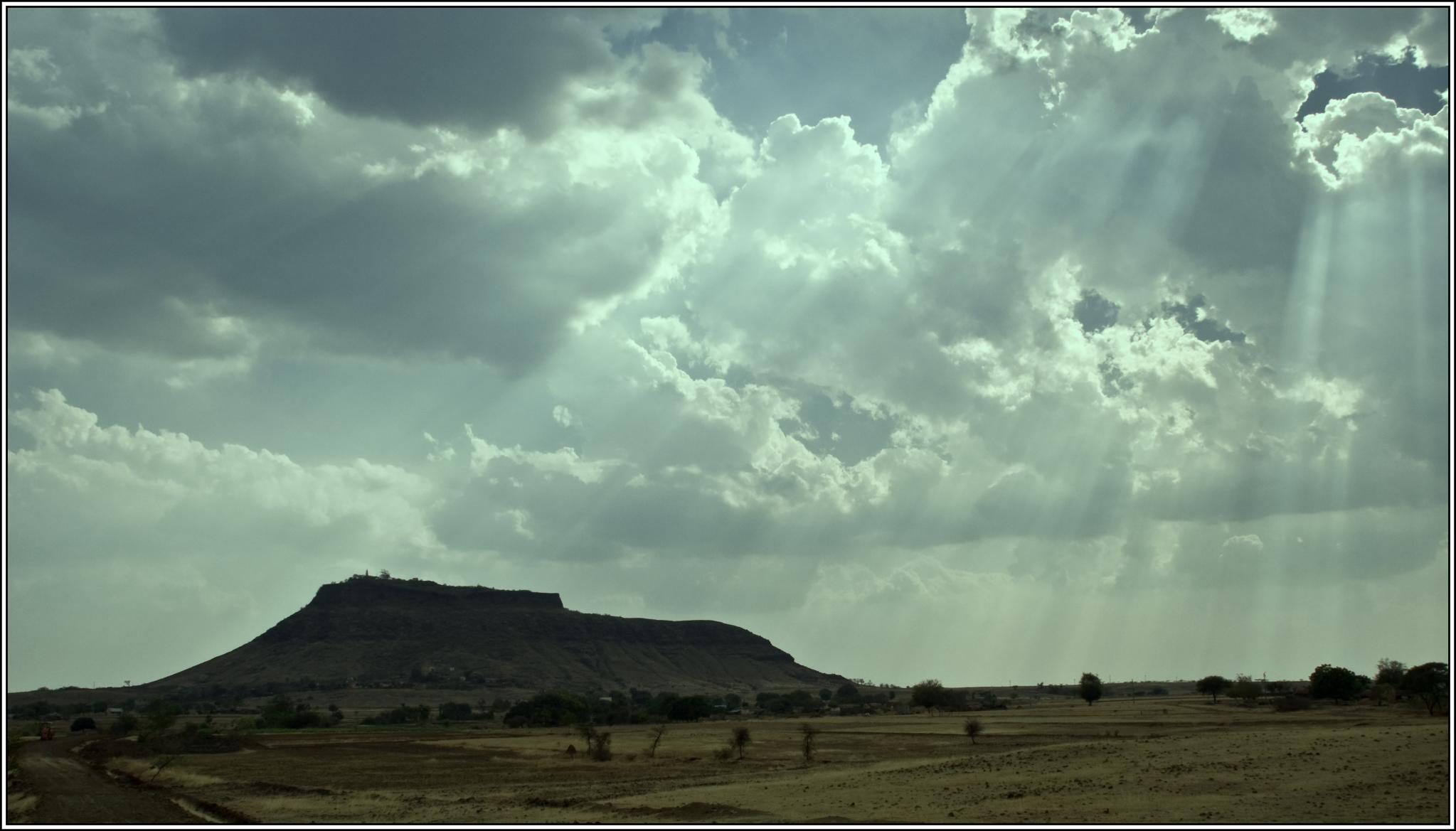
- Bhushangad as seen from the plains

Site information
- Type: Hill Fort

Location
- Shown within Maharashtra Bhushangad (India)
- Coordinates: 17°27′53″N 74°24′23″E

Bhushangad is a hill fort in the Khatav taluk of the Satara district of Maharashtra, India. It is oval in shape, and rises 600 feet (180 m) above the surrounding plain. Its top is flat, and measures to be about 300 square yards (250 m^{2}) in area.

The origins of the fort are unclear. Local legend attributes construction of the fort to King Singhana of Devagiri (1210–1246). Construction has also been attributed to Shivaji I in 1676, as part of a fortification of the area that included the nearby Vardhangad Fort, Sadashivgad and Machindragad.

The fort is home to the only temple of Haranaidevi (an incarnation of Durga), who is revered by the Kulkarnis clan. There is also a temple dedicated to Maruti.

== See also ==
- List of forts in Maharashtra
