= Chandan Fort =

- Satara district, Maharashtra
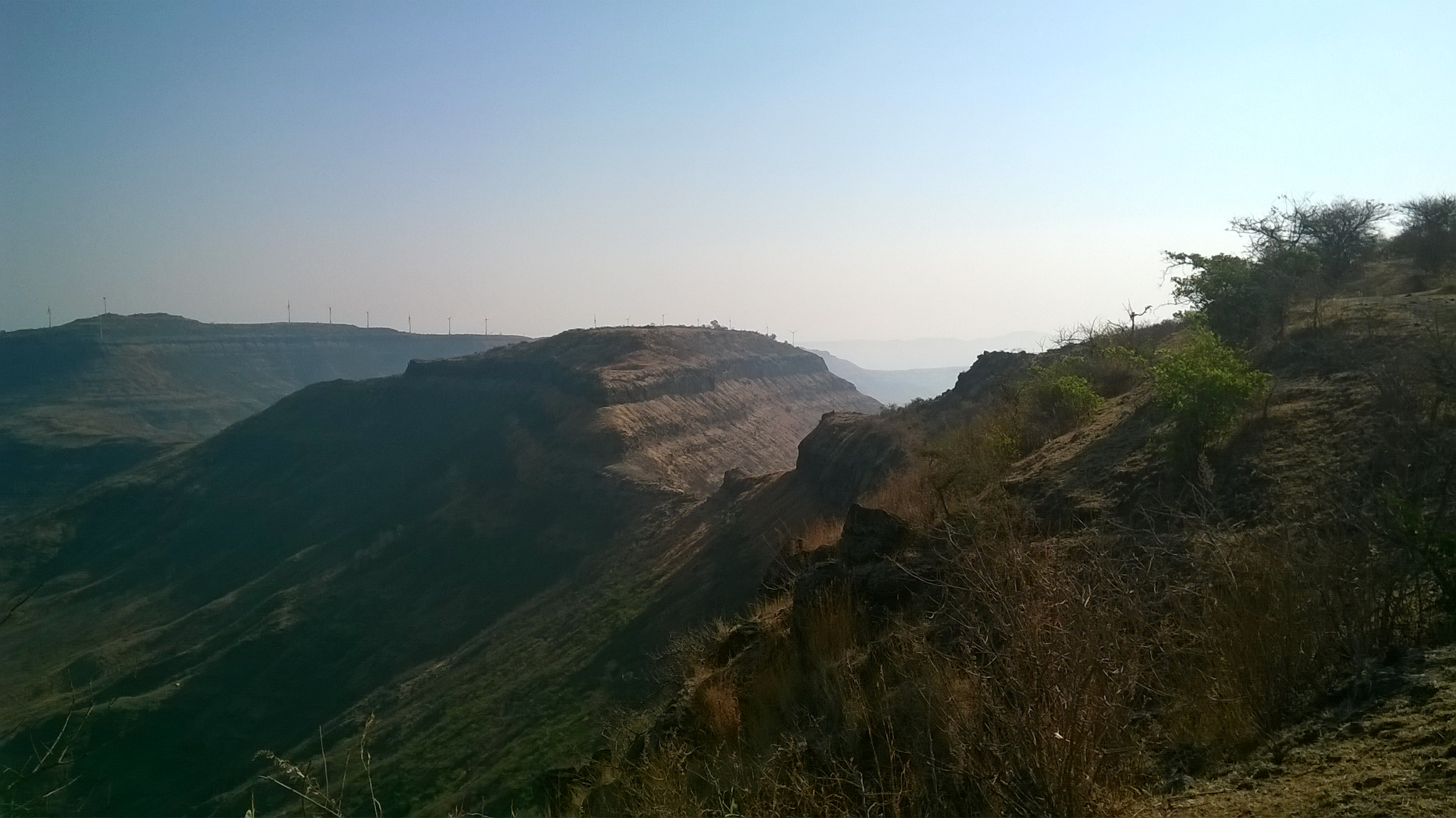
- Chandan fort seen from Vandan fort

Site information
- Type: Hill fort
- Owner: Government of India
- Open to the public: Yes
- Condition: Ruins

Location
- Shown within Maharashtra
- Coordinates: 17°50′50.7″N 74°02′41.3″E
- Height: 3800Ft.

Site history
- Materials: Stone

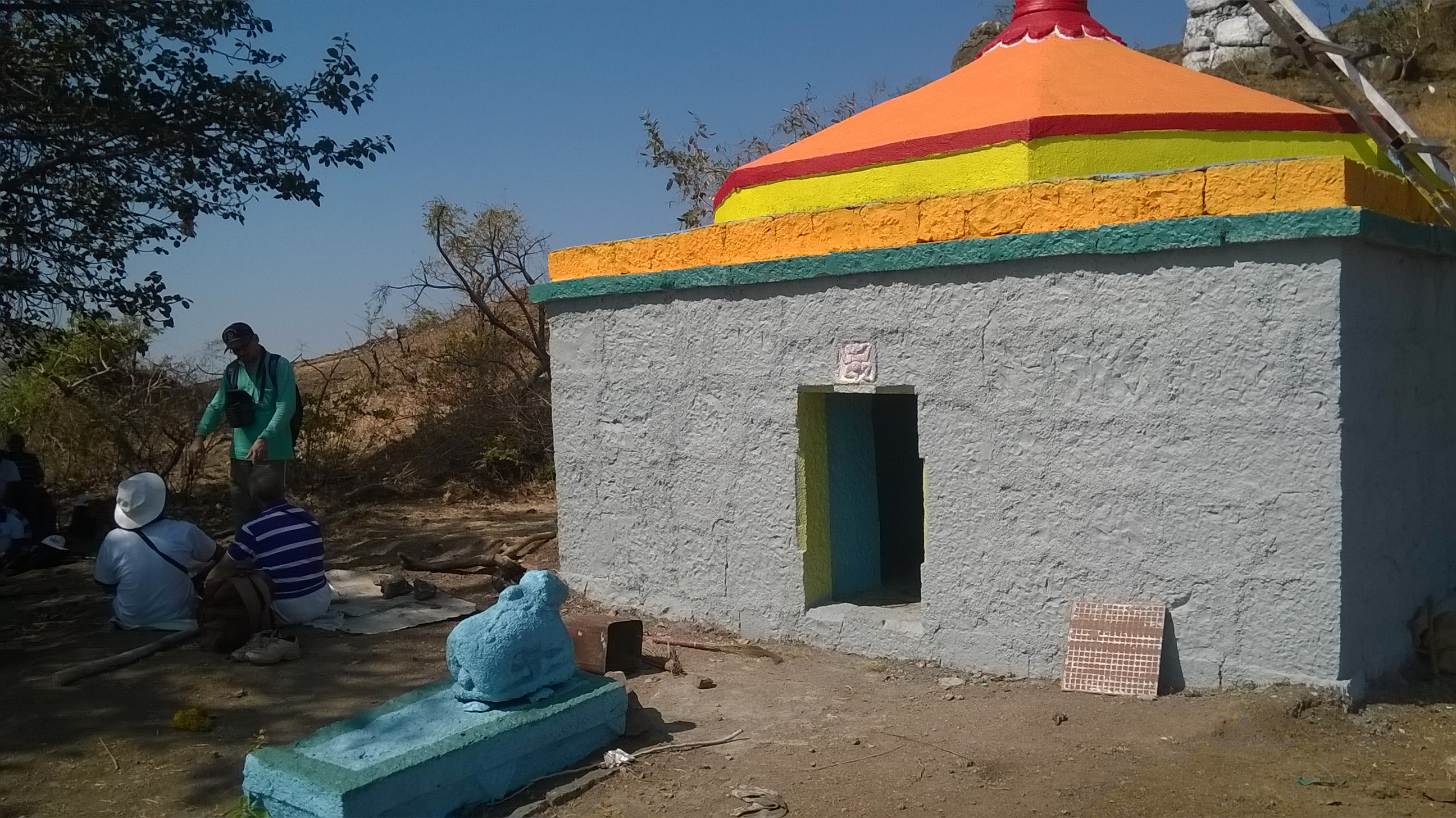
Shiva temple

Chandan and Vandan fort map

Chandan Fort is located in Satara District. This fort is situated on a hilly spur from the main ridge of Sahyadri. This fort is frequently visited by trekkers and pilgrims. The villages at the base are rich in sugarcane and other cultivation. The Chandan and Vandan are adjacent forts. The trek to both the fort can easily be completed in a day.

== Places of interest ==
The fort is in good condition. The main entrance gate is in ruins, There is a Gaus Pak Baba (Mebub-e-Subhani) Dargah, water cistern, and bastion on the fort. There is an old Shiva temple on the fort with two Linga sculptures. Every year in the month of Shravan there is a festival celebrated by nearby villages. The path to the fort passes through an open area devoid of any vegetation. This fort has a peculiar stone piled structure. The path on the fort passes between the piles. On the southern part of the fort are three rooms built-in stone without any roof. They are believed to be store rooms.

== History ==
According to the evidence from the manuscripts found written on copper plates, the Chandan and Vandan forts were built by King Bhoj-II of Shilahar Dynasty in 1191-1192. King Shivaji won these forts from Adilshah of Bijapur in 1673. However, according to the latest studies published by Akhil, Maharashtra Itihas Parishad, and Bharat Itihas Sanshodhak Mandal, the first fort captured by Chatrapati Shivaji was Chandan after he took an oath at Raireshvar. An old temple of shiva in the Rohideshvar area in the village of Raireshvar. It was under the control of the Marathas until 1689, after which it passed in the hand of Moghuls. It was again won by the Marathas before 1695 and Aurangzeb had to fight again to recapture it in 1701. In 1707, it was finally captured by Chatrapati Shahu Maharaj.

== How to reach ==
The nearest town is Bhuinj which is 87 km from Pune located on NH-4. There are no good hotels and resorts near the fort. There are three ways to reach the fort. one path starts from the village Kholvadi and another from Ibrahimpur (Banawadi) which is the easiest one and the third one from Belmachi. The road from Bhuinj detours around the fort hill to reach Kholvadi. The vehicles are to be kept in either village and trekking of 1 hr leads to the fort. There are no good potable water bodies on the fort, however, a night stay on the fort is a memorable experience. If planned properly both the forts can be visited in a single day. The way from Pune is shared in the link

== See also ==
- Shivaji
- List of forts in Maharashtra
