= Markanda Fort =

Markandya Fort
- मार्कंड्या किल्ला
- Part of Ajintha Satmal Hill Range
- Nashik district, Maharashtra

Site information
- Type: Hill fort
- Owner: Government of India
- Controlled by: Maratha Empire (1670-1818); United Kingdom: East India Company (1818-1857); British Raj (1857-1947); India (1947-)
- Open to the public: Yes
- Condition: Ruins

Location
- Shown within Maharashtra Markandya Fort (India)
- Coordinates: 20°23′05.5″N 73°55′39.9″E
- Height: 4383 Ft

Site history
- Materials: Stone

Markandya Fort/Markinda Fort/ Markanda fort (Marathi: मार्कंड्या किल्ला, Hindi: मार्कंड्या क़िला, transliteration: Markandeya Qilа̄) is a fort located 52 km (32 mi)from Nashik, Nashik district, of Maharashtra. The base village is Mulane on the Wani-Kalwan Link Road. The nearest town is Wani, which is 5.5 km from Mulane village. This fort is opposite the holy Saptashringi hill.

== History ==
It is believed that the holy Hindu sage Markandeya lived on the fort and punished the Bhimasur and other demons who were attacking Bhramin priests. The Rashtrakutas issued various grants to the place called Mayur Khndi. This fort served as an outpost. In 1639 the Mughal commander Aliwardikhan won the fort along with the neighbouring forts. In the first week of October 1670 Shivaji while retreating from Surat after the loot was intercepted by the Moghul forces led by Daudkhan near Kanchan-Manchana forts. The Moghuls suffered a sizeable loss in the battle. On 25 October 1670 Moropant Pingale moved to the Nashik region and captured Aundha fort, Trymbakgad fort, Patta Fort, Ravlya, Jawlya and Markandya. After the death of Shivaji Maharaj the fort was again captured by the Moghuls.The Peshwas kept a garrison on the hill. The fort was captured by Captain Briggs of East India company in 1818.

== How to reach ==
The base village of the fort is Mulane. There are good hotels at Wani, now tea and snacks are also available in small hotels on the highway. The trekking path starts from the Mulanbari Gorge (Khind) joining the Markandeya hill and the Rawlya-Jawlya hill which is located north of the base village. The route is very safe and wide. There are no trees on the trekking route. It takes about an hour to reach the hillock of the fort. The night stay on the fort can be made in the temples.

== Places to see ==
The fort comprises a table land and a hill top. There is a small pond called Kotithirth where Hindu pilgrims take a dip on Somvati Amavasya. There is also a water pond called Kamandaluthirth. There are two underground granaries near this pond. There are few building structures on the fort which are now in ruined state except for a temple which is in good condition. There is a temple of Markandeya on the top of the hill.

== See also ==
- List of forts in Maharashtra
- List of forts in India
- Marathi People
- List of Maratha dynasties and states
