= Ghargad =

Fort in Maharashtra, India

Ghargad Fort
- घरगड किल्ला
- Part of Amboli Hill Range (Nashik)
- Nashik district, Maharashtra

Site information
- Type: Hill fort
- Owner: Government of India
- Controlled by: Maratha Empire (1739-1818); United Kingdom: East India Company (1818-1857); British Raj (1857-1947); India (1947-)
- Open to the public: Yes
- Condition: Ruins

Location
- Shown within Maharashtra Ghargad Fort (India)
- Coordinates: 19°53′05.5″N 73°38′29.5″E
- Height: 3156 Ft.

Site history
- Materials: Stone

Ghargad Fort / Gadgada Fort (Marathi: घरगड किल्ला) is a fort located 145 km from Mumbai, in Nashik district, of Maharashtra. This fort is less visited fort in Nashik district. This fort is quite difficult to climb.

== History ==
Much less history about this fort is known. This fort surrendered to the British immediately after the fall of the Trymbakgad. Captain Briggs captured this fort in 1818. This fort was under the control of the British till Indian independence.

== How to reach ==
The nearest town is Ghoti which is 129 km from Mumbai. The base village of the fort is Gadgad Sangvi which is 16 km from Ghoti. There are good hotels at Ghoti. The trekking path starts from the hillock north of the base village. The route is narrow and covered with bushes. There are no trees on the trekking route. It takes about an hour to reach the entrance gate of the fort.

== Places to see ==
There are two gates on the main entrance path of the fort. There is a rock-cut water cistern and a cave on the fort. It takes about an hour to visit all places on the fort.

== See also ==
- List of forts in Maharashtra
- List of forts in India
- Marathi People
- Battles involving the Maratha Empire
- Maratha Army
- East India Company
- Military history of India
