= Kelve Fort =

- केळवे किल्ला
- Part of Konkan coast
- Thane district, Maharashtra

Site information
- Type: Sea Fort
- Owner: Government of India
- Controlled by: Portugal (1594); Maratha Empire (1739-1818); United Kingdom: East India Company (1818-1857); British Raj (1857-1947); India (1947-)
- Open to the public: Yes
- Condition: Ruins

Location
- Shown within Maharashtra Kelve Fort (India)
- Coordinates: 19°37′05.1″N 72°43′41.8″E
- Height: at MSL

Site history
- Materials: Black Basalt Stone

Kelve Fort, or Kelva Fort (Marathi: केळवे किल्ला), is a fort in the Thane district of Maharashtra, located 12.5 km from Palghar. This fort is amidst the Casuarina plantation on the Kelwa Beach. This fort is in ruined condition. The outer walls, steps, parapets, bastions etc. are still of solid masonry are in excellent order and worth seeing. The half of the fort is below the sandy beach level. The fort is located in the Mangelwada of Kelve village. There is a small Kelve pankot on the mouth of the Kelve creek.

== History ==
This fort was built by Portuguese. The Portuguese reported that in 1727 there was a garrison of sixty men in the fort out of which seven were white. There were 15 guns of two to ten pounder size but there were no artillerymen. Most of the guns were unserviceable. After the siege of Vasai Fort by Chimaji Appa, the Maratha army captured this fort on 10 January 1739. The fort was captured by British Army in 1818. The half buried fort in the sandy soil was unearthed in 2008–09.

== Description ==
The fort is rectangular in shape. The entrance gate is east facing immediately followed by another gate at a right angle. There are four triangular bastions triangular on the four corners of the fort.

== See also ==
- List of forts in Maharashtra
- List of forts in India
- Chimaji Appa
- Marathi People
- Maratha Navy
- List of Maratha dynasties and states
- Battles involving the Maratha Empire
- Maratha Army
- Maratha titles
- Military history of India
