= Indori fort =

Indori Fort
- भुईकोट किल्ला इंदोरी
- Pune district, Maharashtra
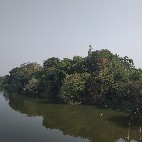
- Indori Fort

Site information
- Type: Hill fort
- Owner: Government of India
- Controlled by: Maratha Empire (1720–1818) United Kingdom: East India Company (1818–1857); British Raj (1857–1947); India (1947-)
- Open to the public: Yes
- Condition: Ruins

Location
- Shown within Maharashtra Indori Fort (India)
- Coordinates: 18°44′09.8″N 73°42′50.7″E
- Height: 4490 Ft.

Site history
- Materials: Basalt Stone

Indori fort also known as Induri Fort (Marathi: इन्दुरी किल्ला)is one of the many Land forts of Maharashtra state in India. Situated close to the hill station Lonavala and 35 km (22 mi) north of Pune, Indori fort rises to an elevation of 1,033 m (3,389 ft) above sea level. The fort is located on the banks of Indrayani River. The fort was under the Maratha Empire for the majority of the time.

== History ==
Indori fort was built by Sarsenapati Khandojirao Yesajirao Dabhade in the year 1720–21. The fort also has a mint building inside the fort which is in a dilapidated state. The widow of Khanderao (Khandojirao), Sarsenapati Umabai Dabhade, was the first and only woman to become Commander-in-Chief of the Maratha forces in 1732.

== Accessibility ==
Indori fort can be accessed by various modes of travel. The nearest railway station is the Ghorawadi 4 km and Talegaon Dabhade railway station which is 4.8 km from Indori Fort are easily accessed by suburban trains between Lonavala and Pune. The nearest major train station is Lonavala, on the Mumbai-Pune railway line. Indori is connected by the Mumbai-Pune Highway and can also be accessed from Talegaon Dabhade (PIN -410506) town.

== Places to see ==
The fort is close to the village Indori. The entrance gate is in good condition. The fort has 9 bastions which are well connected by fortification wall. The walls of the fort are 30–40 feet high made of basalt rock with brick work at the top. There is a temple of Kadjai inside the fort.

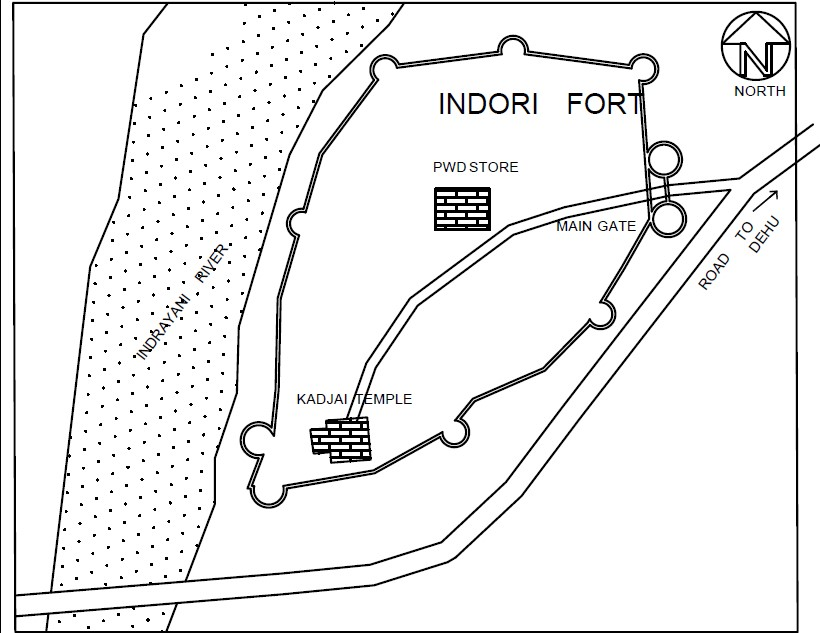
Map of the Fort

== Gallery ==
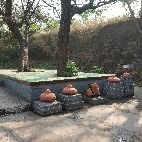

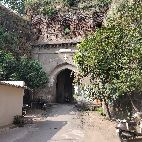

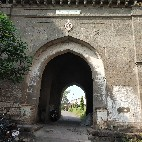
Entrance gate

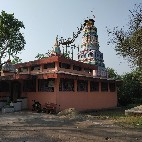
Kadjai temple inside the fort

== See also ==
- List of forts in Maharashtra
