= Mangad Fort =

Survey fort in Maharashtra, India

- Raigad district, Maharashtra

Site information
- Type: Hill fort
- Owner: Government of India
- Open to the public: Yes
- Condition: Ruins

Location
- Shown within Maharashtra
- Coordinates: 18°18′43.3″N 73°21′04″E
- Height: 750 ft(234m)

Site history
- Materials: Stone

Mangad Fort is a survey fort which is situated in Borwadi, an area near Mashidwadi in Mangaon, a taluka in Raigad district in the Indian state of Maharashtra. The fort is made sacred by the footsteps of the founder of Hindavi Swaraj, the famous Maratha king Chhatrapati Shivaji Maharaja. Mangaon is situated about 150 km from Mumbai.

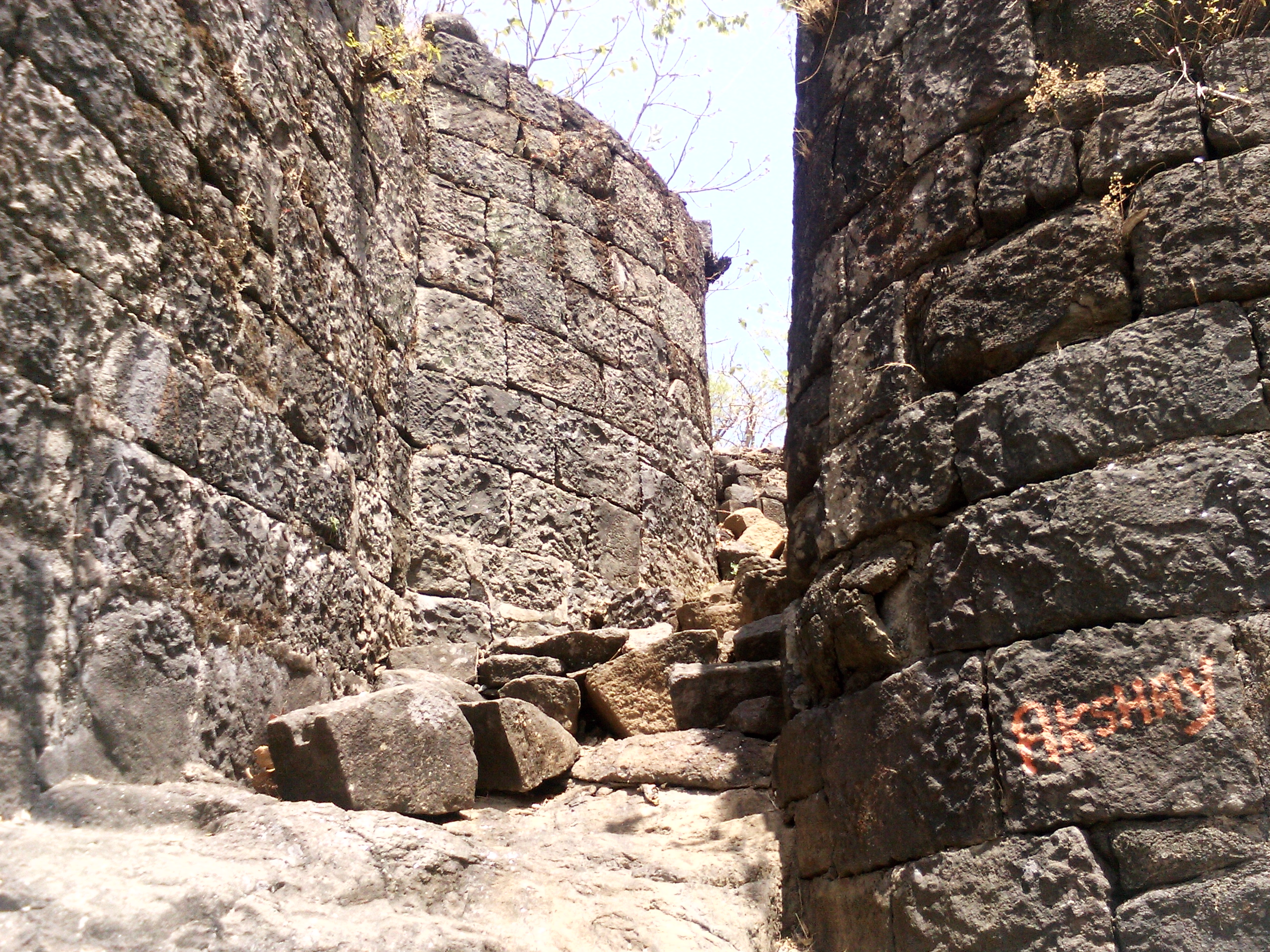
Fort entrance

== Surrounding Area ==
To the south of this fort, there is Jore valley. To the east, there is Konkan Diva Fort. To the southwest, there is a village Gangawali, which is the birthplace of Chhattrapati Shahu.

The fort is 235 meters above sea level. At the base of the fort, there is an old layout temple of the goddess Vinzai" (विंझाई). From the east side, there is an entrance to the temple in the cow mouth type tradition. Near the entrance of the temple, there is a carved scripture of a fish and lotus.

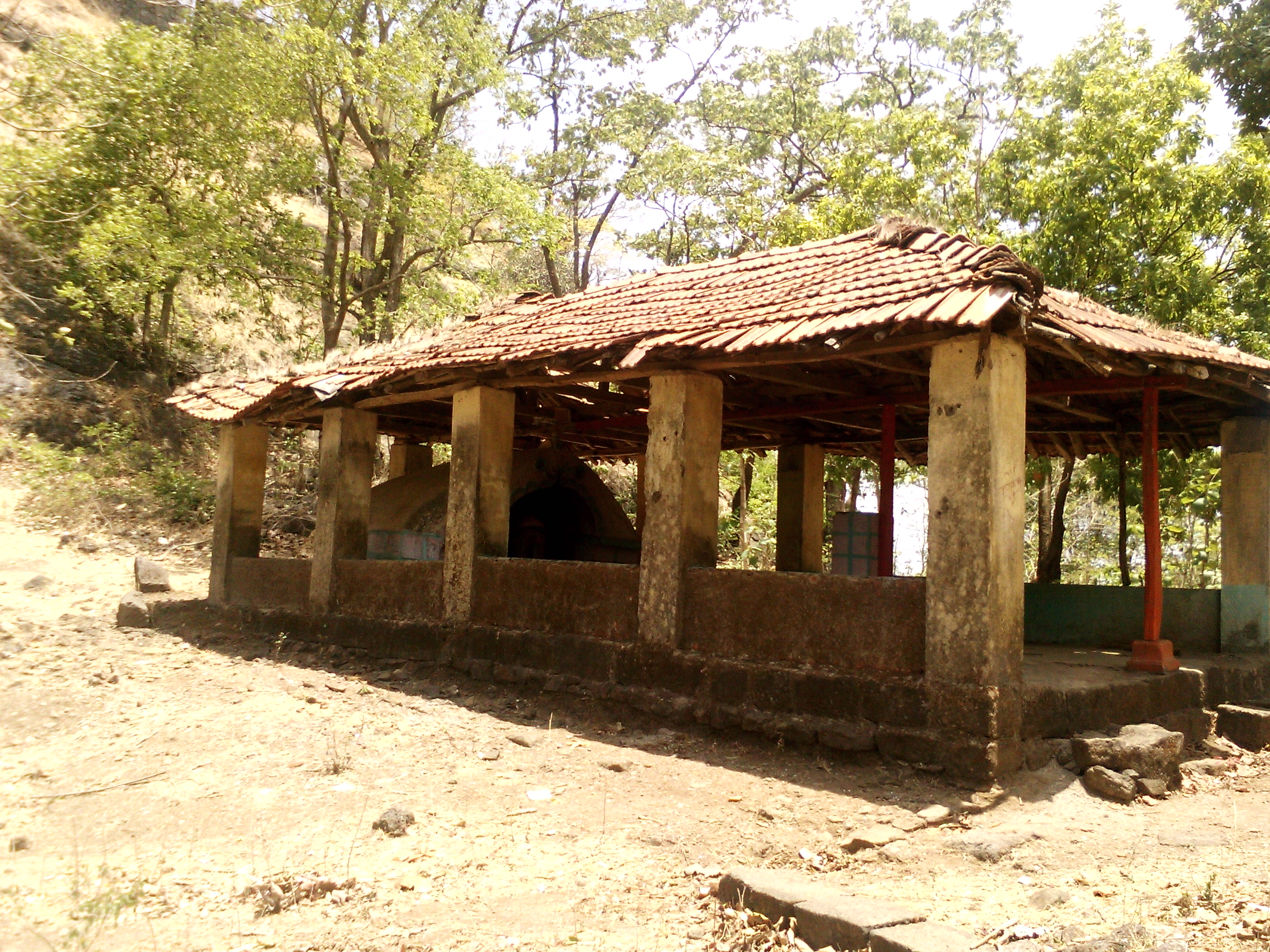
Before going on the fort, people visited the temple

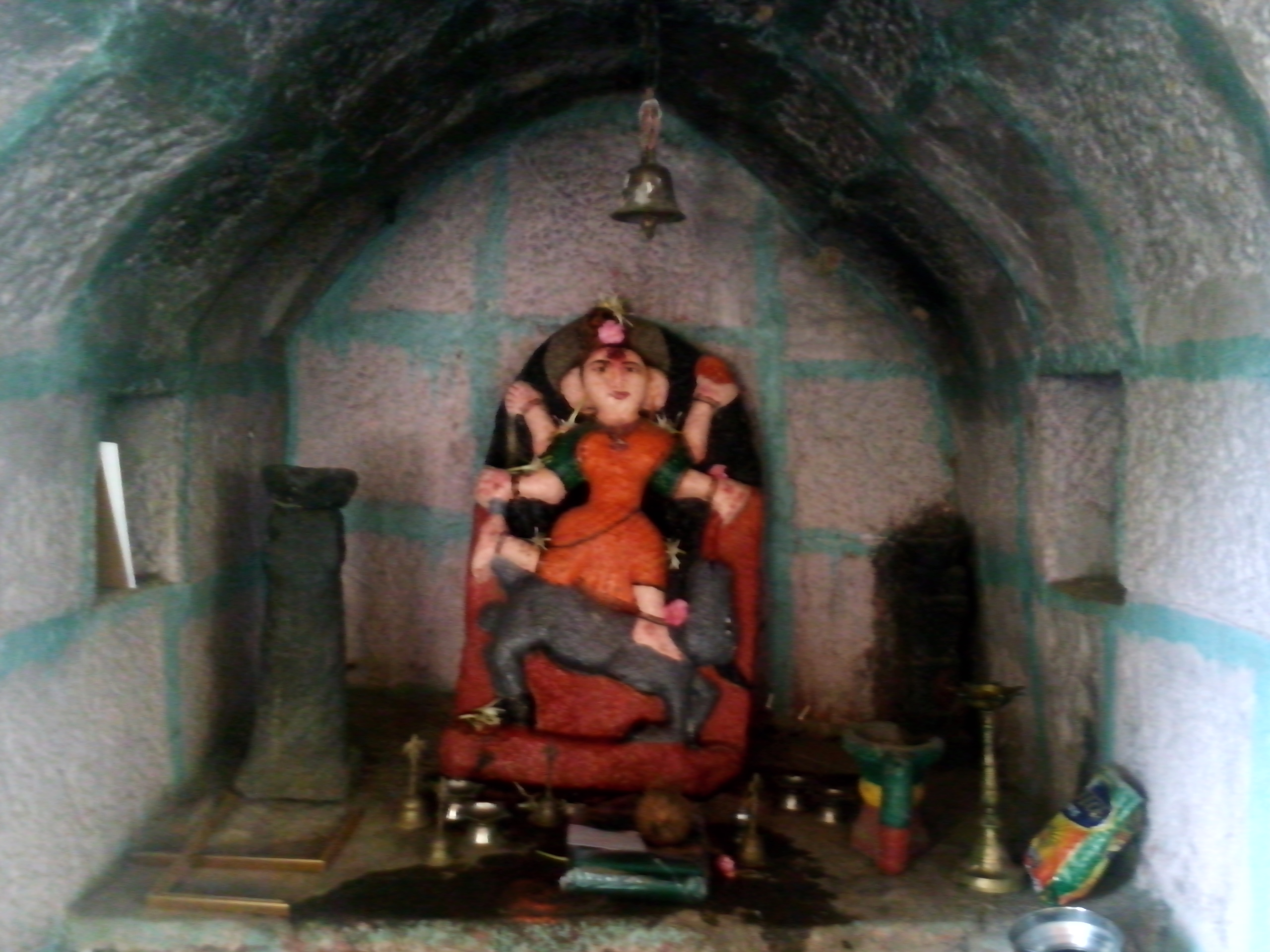
The idol of Goddess Vinzai is on the fort

On the left side, there are four water tanks (wells) and a cave which can accommodate about 50 persons. During historical days this was used for storing food grains. On this fort, there are remnants of irregular's soldiery, a big house of "Killedars" (किल्लेदार - in charge of the fort) deputed by the king to rule and protect the whole area. To the south end fort, there is an open ground, where there has been military training.

== History ==
In the Treaty of Purandar, Mangad Fort was surrendered to Aurangzeb. In 1818, when there was the end of Peshwa rule, this fort was won by "Col. Prother" - a British officer.

== How to reach ==
To reach Mangad fort-From Mumbai- (112 km by road), regular State transport buses operate from Mumbai central/Dadar/ Thane to the Mangaon ( Taluka Place). one has to take other bus/rickshaw to reach Nizampur ( 12 km from Mangaon) from where again a rickshaw will reach you to Borwadi ( 4 km from Nizampur). From Borwadi it is a walk of 1 hr to reach the Mangad fort. From the village Borwadi, the fort is seen easily towards East. It is also approachable from Villages Mashidwadi and Chach. If the sky is clear, Sudhagad fort, Tala Fort, and the Arabian sea are clearly visible. The best time to visit is during the winter and rainy season. The water in the tanks is potable.

== People Related ==
The bandmaster powers of this fort were with the "Thule" family and the subheads powers were with "Govindaji More". ‘Prabhu’ were the Karkhanis of this fort. Killedars were "Jayawantrao Mankar". We can read the "Sanad" (सनद) of that historical period with "Jadhav Family" who is Vatandar staying at the fort base in Mashidwadi Village. At the entrance of Mashidwadi Village, there is a temple of Kalbhairav (काळभैरव), which is now in almost good condition. Due to this "Mangad Fort," the taluka is also called as "Mangaon Taluka".
