= Dhunda fort =

Dhunda Fort
- धुंदया किल्ला
- Part of Dhundeshwar Hill Range
- Nashik district, Maharashtra

Site information
- Type: Hill fort
- Owner: government of India
- Open to the public: yes
- Condition: in ruins

Location
- Shown within Maharashtra Dhunda Fort (India)
- Coordinates: 20°37′13.1″N 74°20′31.1″E
- Height: 2280 Ft.

Site history
- Materials: Stone

Dhunda Fort (Marathi: धुंदा किल्ला, Hindi: धुंदया किला, transliteration: Dhundya Qilа̄)is located 106 km from Nashik, Nashik district, of Maharashtra.The Dhundya fort is located on a single hillock west of the road from Malegaon to Satana.

== History ==
The fort was positioned to overlook the trade route from Khandesh to Nashik.

== How to reach ==
The base village is easily accessible from Malegaon and Satana. It takes about 1 hour to see the fort.

== Places to see ==
The fort is also called as Dundeshwar Mahraj hill. There is nothing structure left on the fort except few ruined buildings and few dried up water cisterns. There is a Bhameshwar temple at the base of the fort. The pathway from the back of the temple leads to the fort hill top. There are two water cisterns and Mahadev mandir at the top of the fort.

== See also ==
- List of forts in Maharashtra
- List of forts in India
- Marathi People
