= Nanded Fort =

Medieval fort in India

Nanded Fort / Nandgiri Fort
- Nanded district, Maharashtra

Site information
- Type: Land fort
- Owner: Government
- Controlled by: Bahmani Sultanate (1358-1527); Ahmadnagar Sultanate (1527-1617); Mughal Empire(1617-1670); Maratha Empire (1670-1689); Moghul Empire(1689-1724); Nizam of Hyderabad(1724-1948); India (1947-)
- Open to the public: Yes
- Condition: Ruined

Location
- Shown within Maharashtra
- Location within Maharashtra
- Coordinates: 19.141720°N 77.324825°E
- Height: 1188 Ft

Site history
- Materials: Basalt Stone

Nanded Fort, also known as Nandgiri Fort , is a fort located 4 km on the banks of Godavari river from Nanded. it was built by Muhammad bin Tughluq, Nanded is connected by rail, air, and road to major cities in India. The fort is about 3 km (1.9 mi) from the Nanded railway station.

== History ==
There are records that Nanda and Satavahana had ruled Nanded. Nanded was known as Nanditat from the records of copper plate found in Vashim (Vatsagulma). The fort is said to have been built by Muhammad bin Tughluq who captured Nanded in 1318. In 1358, the fort was under the rule of Mohammed Shah I of the Bahmani Sultanate. In 1398 a local Gond chief from Berar captured Nanded and Mahur. In 1428 Ahmad Shah I Wali won the Nanded and Mahurgad. Burhan Nizam Shah of Ahmadnagar defeated Aladdin Imad Shah of Berar Sultanate in 1527. In 1602 a fierce battle took place at Nanded between Malik Ambar and Khan Khanan of Mughal Empire in which he was defeated. In 1617 the Moghul Emperor Shah Jahan defeated the Ahmednagar rulers and gained control of the fort. In 1670 Chatrapati Shivaji Maharaj gained control of Aurangabad and Berar. After the death of Shivaji, the Mughals again gained. The six-monthly revenue during the Mughal period was Rs 20,68,193. Nizam-ul-Mulk, Asaf Jah I of Hyderabad defeated Alam Ali Khan and Dilavar Khan in the Battle of Balapur. The Nanded remained under the control of Nizam of Hyderabad until the princely state of Hyderabad was annexed to Union of India in 1948.

== Geography ==
The double fortification had a total of 24 bastions earlier; now only eight bastions are in good condition. The bastions are 18–20 meters in height. The fort has been converted into a garden to attract tourists. There is a water tank constructed in the fort.

The fort is accessible in all seasons. It takes about 20 minutes to reach the fort entrance from the main city. There is also another route from Kinwat but it passes through dense jungles. It takes another hour to visit the entire fort.

== See also ==
- List of forts in Maharashtra
- Nanded district
