= Jangali Jayagad =

Fort in Maharashtra, India

- Location within Maharashtra

Highest point
- Elevation: 965 m (3,166 ft)
- Coordinates: 17°27′12.8″N 73°41′37.6″E

Geography
- Location: Maharashtra, India
- Parent range: Western Ghats

Climbing
- Easiest route: Hike

Jangali Jayagad is located in Patan taluka of Satara District. This fort is situated on a hilly spur from the main ridge of Sahyadri. This fort is less visited due to its occurrence in Koyana Wildlife sanctuary. The nearby village is Nawja. The trek to the fort can easily be completed in a day.

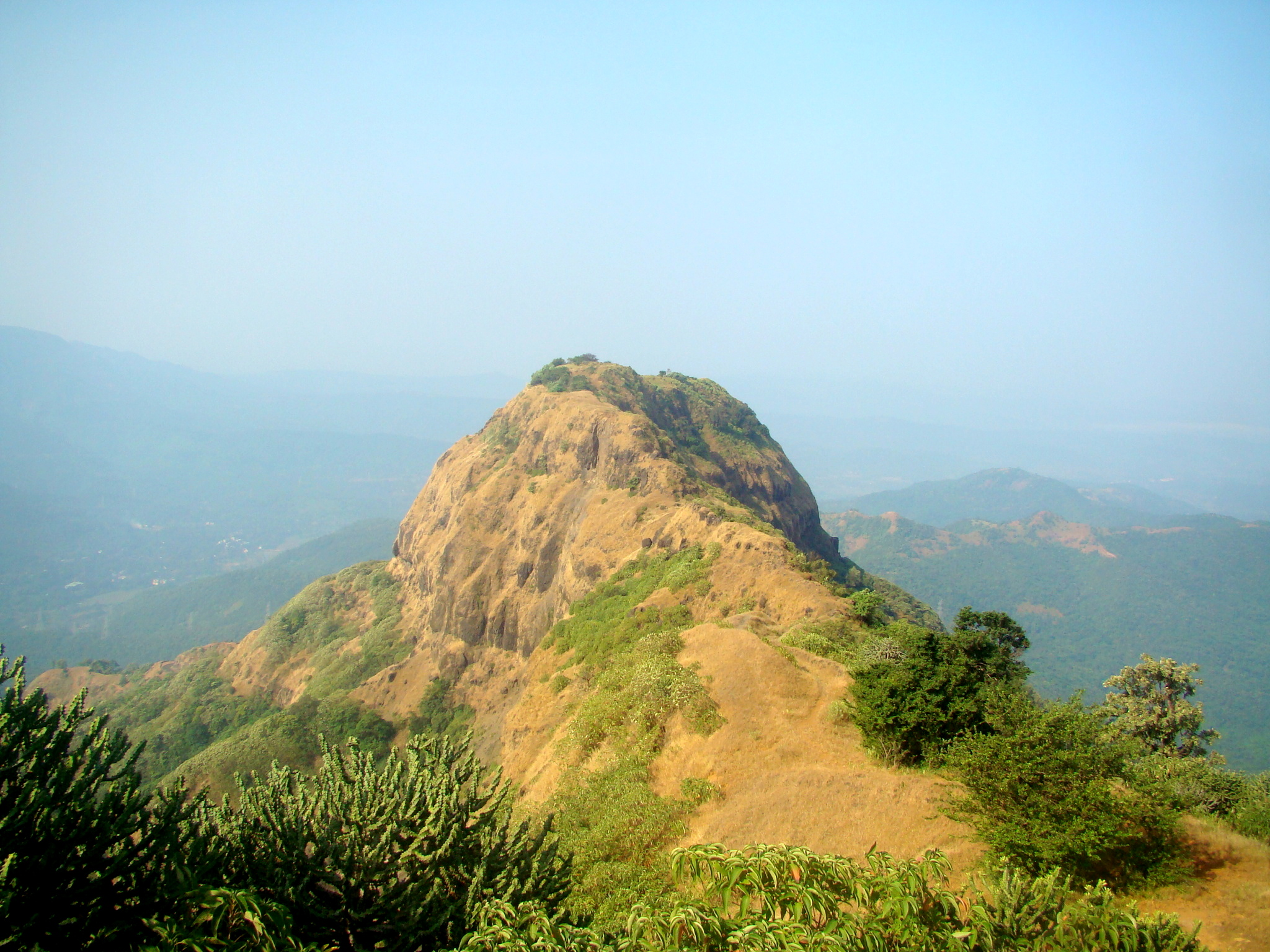
Fort

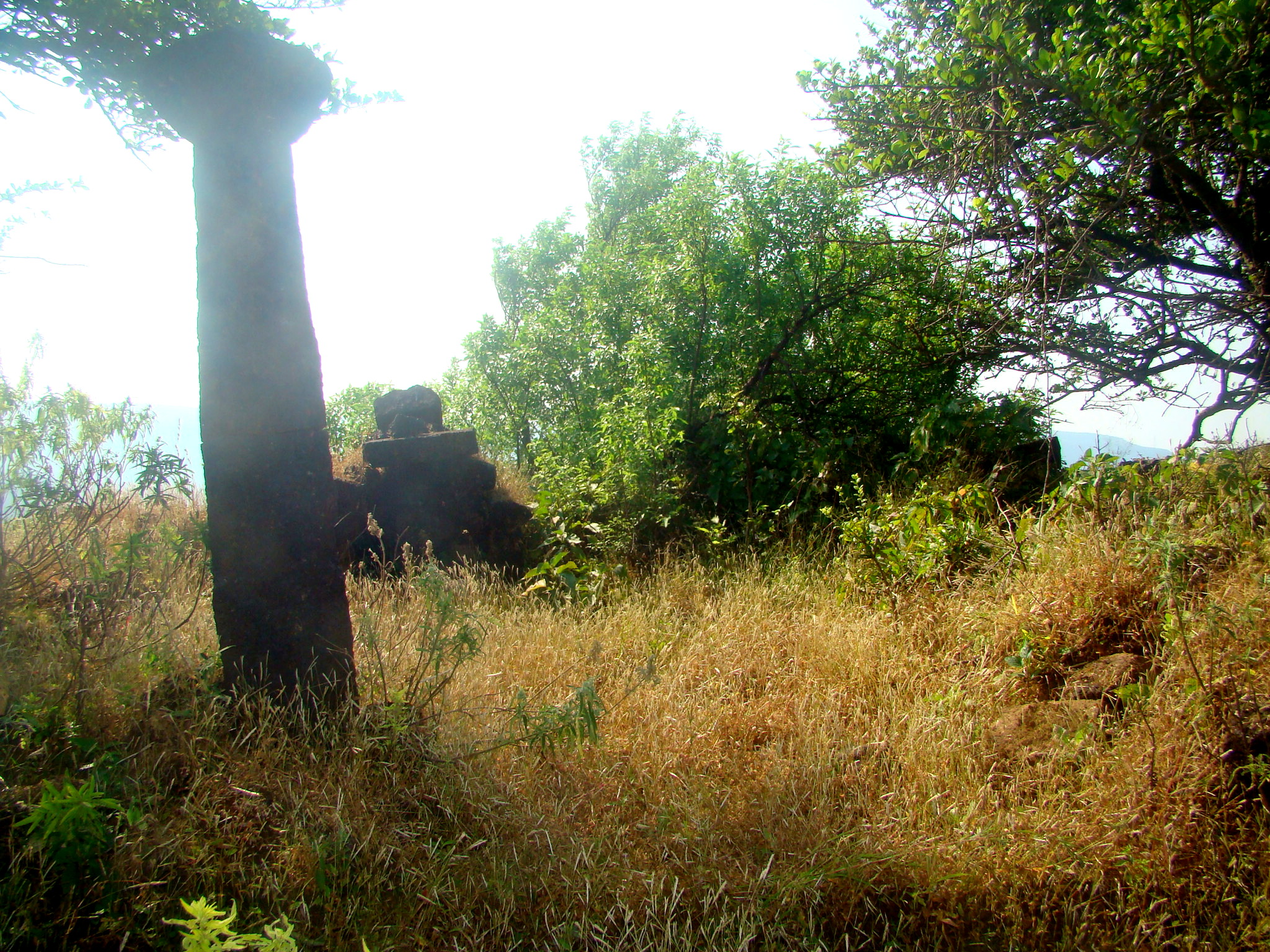
Devi temple

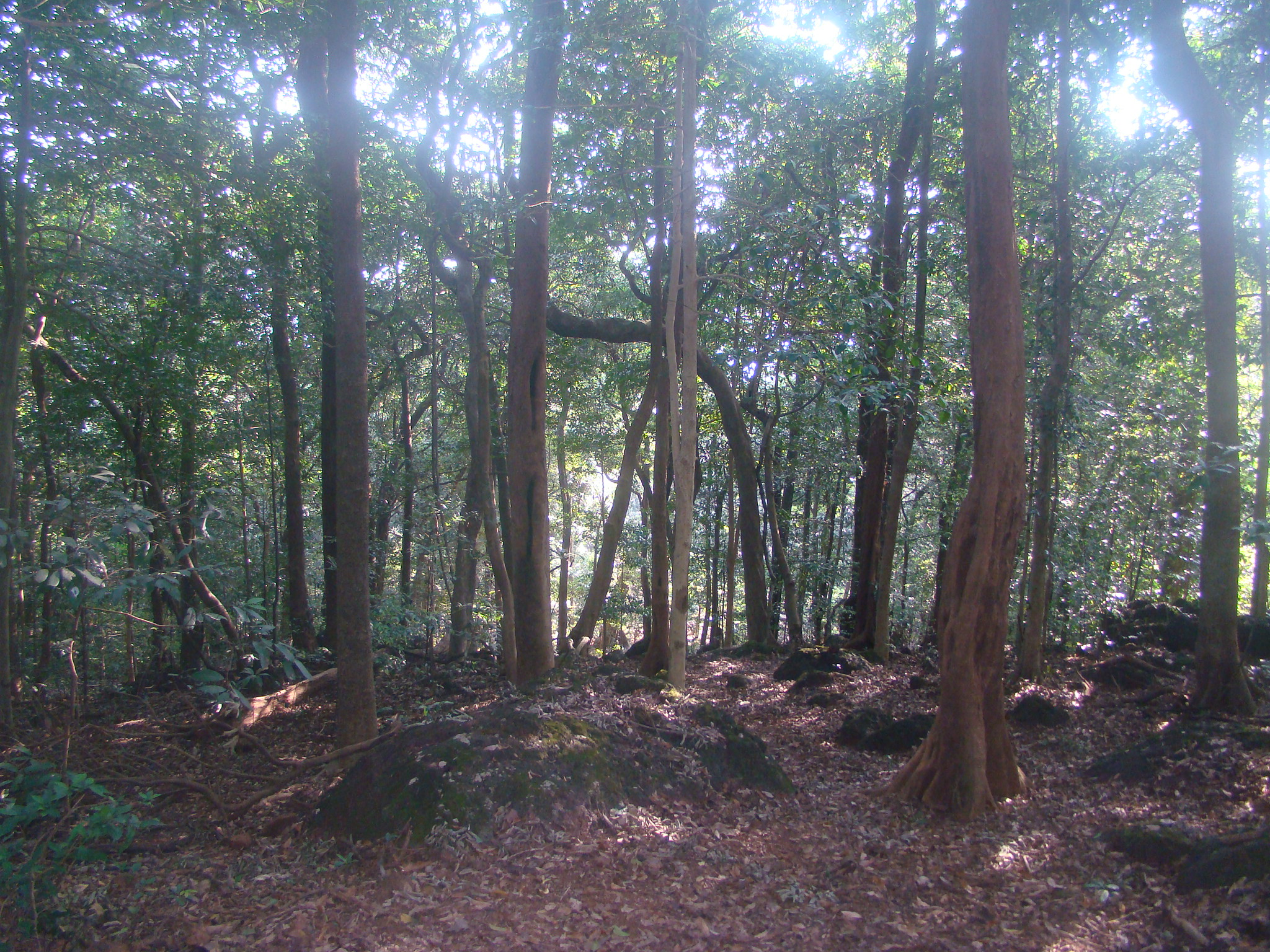
Jungle

== Places of interest ==
The fort is in a very dilapidated condition. There is no main entrance gate, water cistern or caves on the fort. There is an old well and ruins of Devi temple. The path to the fort passes through dense forest. The scats, droppings, hoof marks and pugmarks of various wild animals can be seen. The path is regularly used by wild Gaur( Bison). The dwindling ghat road to Chiplun can be seen from the fort. The jungle is home to variety of Insects, Birds, reptiles and animals.

== How to reach ==
Nearest town is Koyananagar which is 43 km (27 mi) from Chiplun. There are good hotels and resorts in Koyananagar. The entry permission to the fort is to be obtained from the forest office at Koyananagar. The village Nawja is located at 11 km from Koyananagar. There are authorised forest local guides staying in Nawja, whose participation in the trek is compulsory. The road from Nawja to the tunnel is to be followed for more 3 km. The vehicles are to be kept on the road and further a trekking of 1 hr leads to the fort. There are leeches and ticks in the forest during humid weather condition.

== See also ==
- Shivaji
- List of forts in Maharashtra
