= Santoshgad =

Fort in Maharashtra, India

Santoshgad Fort
- Satara District, Maharashtra, India

Site information
- Owner: Government of India
- Open to the public: Yes

Location
- India
- Coordinates: 17.858°N 74.321°E
- Height: 884m (2900 ft)

Santoshgad (also referred to as Tathavade, the name of the closest village) is a fort in Phaltan taluka of Satara district in Maharashtra, India. Santoshgad hill fort lies in the north-west corner of the Phaltan taluka, about 12 miles (19 km) south-west of Phaltan.

== See also ==
- List of forts in Maharashtra
