= Sarjekot fort =

Sarjekot Fort
- सर्जेकोट
- सिंधुदुर्ग District, Maharashtra

Site information
- Owner: Mr. Shailesh Khanda lekar
- Controlled by: Shailesh Khandalekar
- Open to the public: Yes
- Condition: Not good, need preservation

Location
- Shown within Maharashtra
- Coordinates: 18.6344°N 72.8642°E
- Height: sea level

Site history
- Built: 1765
- Built by: छत्रपती शिवाजी महाराज
- Materials: laterite stone
- Demolished: partially demolished in battles

Garrison information
- Occupants: Shailesh Khandalekar and Family

Sarjekot Fort (Marathi: सर्जेकोट)is an old military fortification in India. it is situated very close to the Malvan. It is located in the Arabian Sea close to the Malvan town in Sindhudurg District of Maharashtra state.

== History ==
The history is similar to the Kolaba fort. This fort was built on the rocks to secure the strategic position.

== Major features ==
This fort is 26mtX27mt in dimension. There are five bastions and stone wall encircling the fort.. the entrance is facing the Kolaba fort. There is a well inside the fort.

== How to reach ==
This fort is close Malvan, near Fort Sindhudurg.

== See also ==
- List of forts in Maharashtra
- List of forts in India
- Sambhaji Maharaj
- Marathi People
- Maratha Navy
- List of Maratha dynasties and states
- Maratha War of Independence
- Battles involving the Maratha Empire
- Maratha Army
- Maratha titles
- Military history of India
- Kanhoji Angre
- Kolaba fort
