= Mahipalgad =

Mahipalgad Fort
- महिपालगड
- Part of Sahyadri Hill Range
- Kolhapur district, Maharashtra

Site information
- Type: Hill fort
- Owner: Government of India
- Controlled by: Maratha Empire (1739-1818); United Kingdom: East India Company (1818-1857); British Raj (1857-1947); India (1947-)
- Open to the public: Yes
- Condition: Ruins

Location
- Shown within Maharashtra Mahipalgad Fort (India)
- Coordinates: 15°54′08.9″N 74°23′11.9″E
- Height: 3,220 ft (980 m)

Site history
- Materials: Laterite Stone

Mahipalgad Fort (Marathi: महिपालगडा)is a fort located 20 km (12 mi)from Belgaum. It is in the Chandgad taluka of Kolhapur district, of Maharashtra. This fort is an important fort in Kolhapur district. The fort is situated on the mountain ridge close to the line dividing Maharashtra and Karnataka state. The fort is amidst dense evergreen forest.

== History ==
The fort is said to be built by Shivaji Maharaj.

== How to reach ==
The nearest town is Belgaum. The base village of the fort is Dewarwadi which is 20 km from Belgaum. There is a good motorbike road up to the fort and requires a drive of 45 minutes from Belgaum. There are good hotels at Belgaum. There are regular buses from belgaum to Dewarwadi.

== Places to see ==
There is a Vaijanath temple on the road to the fort. This temple is believed to be built in 11th century in Hemadpanti style. There is a majestic stone cut Nandi bull in front of the temple. Adjacent to the temple is the temple of goddess Aarogya Bhavani. The pillars of the temple are beautifully carved. There is a sacred water (tirtha) cistern behind the temple. On the way to the fort are rock cut caves called Mahipalgad caves. The fort has a good entrance gate with walls encircling the Mahipalgad village. There is a one-storey citadel inside the fort which is 70 ft long and 40 ft wide. There is a water cistern and a temple of Ambabai goddess behind the citadel. The bastion on the eastern side is in good condition, there is a Shiva temple near the bastion. Most of the structures and remains are built in laterite rock.

== See also ==
- List of forts in Maharashtra
- List of forts in India
- Marathi People
- List of Maratha dynasties and states
