= Tipagad (Gadchiroli) =

Small fort situated in the Taluka Korchi of Gadchiroli district

Tipagad Fort
- Gadchiroli district, Maharashtra

Site information
- Type: Hill fort
- Owner: Government of India
- Open to the public: Yes
- Condition: Ruins

Location
- Shown within Maharashtra
- Coordinates: 20°29′04.4″N 80°32′02.2″E
- Height: 2000 feet

Site history
- Materials: Stone

Tipagad is a small fort situated in the Taluka Korchi of Gadchiroli district. The nearest village is Sawargaon which is 100 km from Desaiganj ( Wadsa).

== History ==
The fort was ruled by the Gond Prince Puram Raja who had a bodyguard of 2000 fighting men, 5 elephants and 25 horses. He held the entire Vairagad Fort country under his control. He was attacked by the King of Chhattisgarh. The Puram Raja won the battle but after an untowards incident, along with the queen were drowned in the lake and the fort became desolate.

== Places to visit ==
This fort is located far away from human habitation in dense teak forest. This fort was earlier part of Murumgaon zamindari area. The fort is flanked by bastion with a large water tank about 150 mt in width. The tank has embankment and steps along its water face. The fort has an outer wall and inner Balekilla raised on a hill top.

== See also ==
- List of forts in Maharashtra
- Gadchiroli
