= Ravlya Fort =

17th Century fort ruins in Maharashtra, India

- रवळ्या किल्ला
- Part of Ajintha Satmal Hill Range
- Nashik district, Maharashtra

Site information
- Type: Hill fort
- Owner: government of India
- Controlled by: Mughal Empire(1636-1670); Maratha Empire (1670-1818); United Kingdom: East India Company (1818-1857); British Raj (1859-1947); India (1947-)
- Open to the public: yes
- Condition: in ruins

Location
- Shown within Maharashtra
- Location within Maharashtra Location within India
- Coordinates: 20°22′19.5″N 73°58′14.1″E
- Height: 4369 Ft.

Site history
- Materials: Stone

Ravalya Fort (Marathi: रवळ्या किल्ला, Hindi: रवल्या किला, transliteration: Ravalya Qilа̄)is located 43 km from Nashik, Nashik district, of Maharashtra. The Ravlya fort and Javlya fort are twin forts located on a single hill plateau. Ravlya on the west and the Javlya on the east side of the hill plateau.

== History ==
The fort was positioned to overlook the trade route from Khandesh to Nashik. The twin forts are also named as "Rola-Jola" forts. In 1636 this fort was won by Alavardikhan for the Mughal emperor Shah Jahan. In 1670 this fort was won by Shivaji Maharaj. In 1671 Dilerkhan encircled the fort with Moghul Army but, was defeated. However, Mahabat Khan captured this fort. This fort was under the Peshwas for a long time until the British forces captured it in 1818. In 1819 Captain Mackintosh destroyed the steps, bastion and the walls of the fort making the ascent of the fort impracticable.

== How to reach ==
There are regular buses from Nashik to Wani. The cole ahead of the base village Babapur can be reached easily by bus. It takes about 5 hours to see both the forts.

== Places to see ==
There is nothing structure left on the fort except few ruined buildings and few dried up water cisterns.

== See also ==
- List of forts in Maharashtra
- List of forts in India
- Marathi People
- List of Maratha dynasties and states
- Maratha War of Independence
- Military history of India
- Mughal Empire
