= Mrugagad =

Hill fort in Maharashtra, India

Mrugagad Fort
- Raigad district, Maharashtra
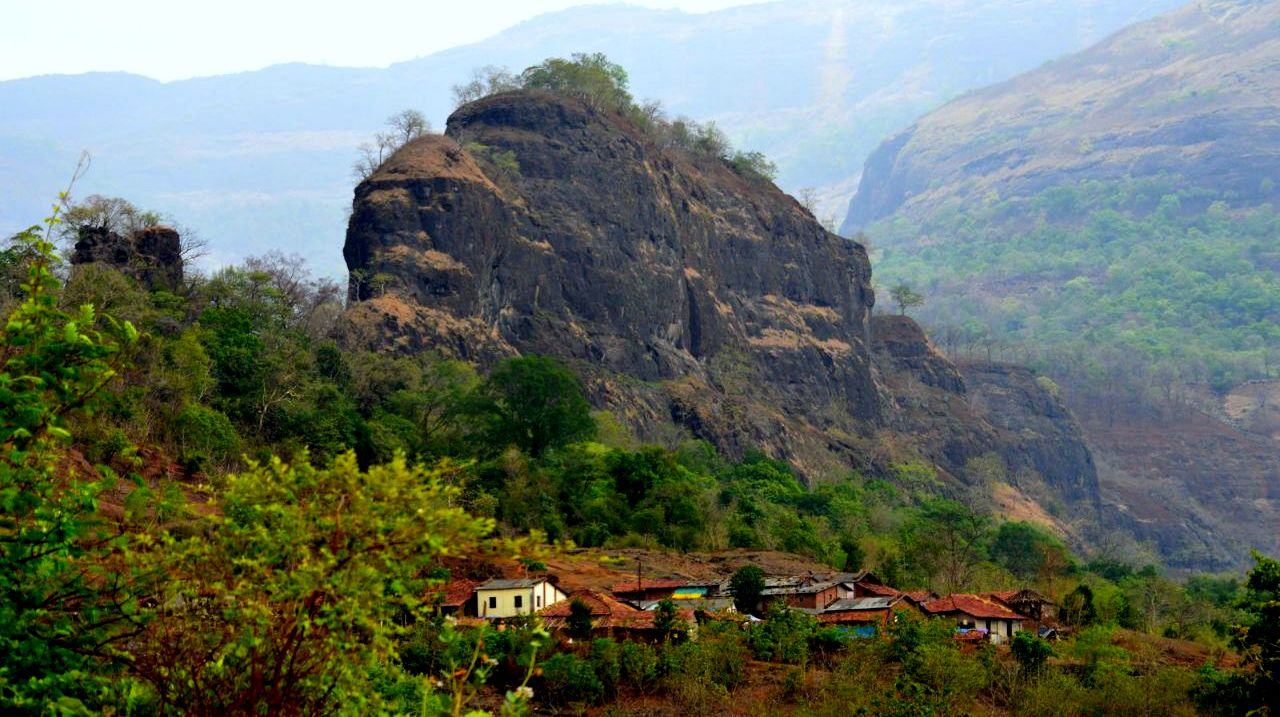
- Mrugagad for falyan village

Site information
- Type: Hill fort
- Owner: Government of India
- Open to the public: Yes
- Condition: Ruins

Location
- Shown within Maharashtra
- Coordinates: 18°41′19.8″N 73°21′51.7″E
- Height: 1750 ft

Site history
- Materials: Stone

Mrugagad fort is a hill fort in Sudhagad taluka of Raigad district, Maharashtra, India. At a height of 1750 ft, the fort lies near Bheliv village, and is made of stone. The fort is very small in size and is in a form of spur radiating from the Western Ghats. The fort is very close to the Lonavala, Khandala and Khopoli.

== How to reach ==
The base village Bheliv is connected by road to the nearest town Jambhulpada. The distance between Bheliv and Khopoli is 30 km. Regular buses and private vehicles are available from Khopoli and Pali to reach Jambhulpada. There are shops or hotels in Parli and Jambhulpada. The trek to the fort starts from the Bheliv village. It takes about 1 hr from the base village to reach the top of the fort. The route passes through dense forest with large mango trees. The rock cut steps on the eastern ridge of the hill, leads to the top of the fort. There is a small empty rock cut cave on the northern edge of the fort, but the steps are very short. There is no water available on the fort, so it is advisable to carry enough water along with.

== Gallery ==
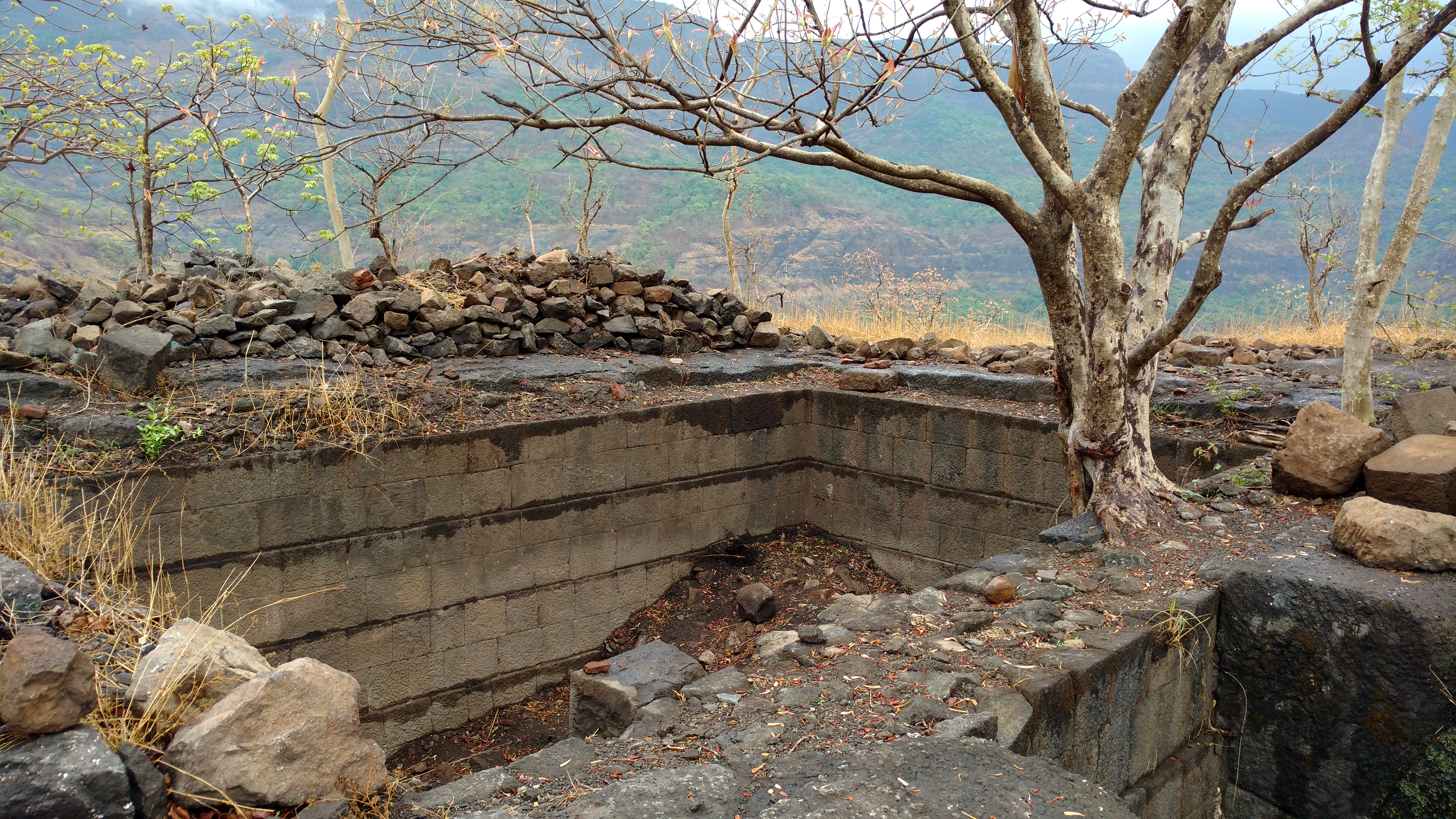
The water tank

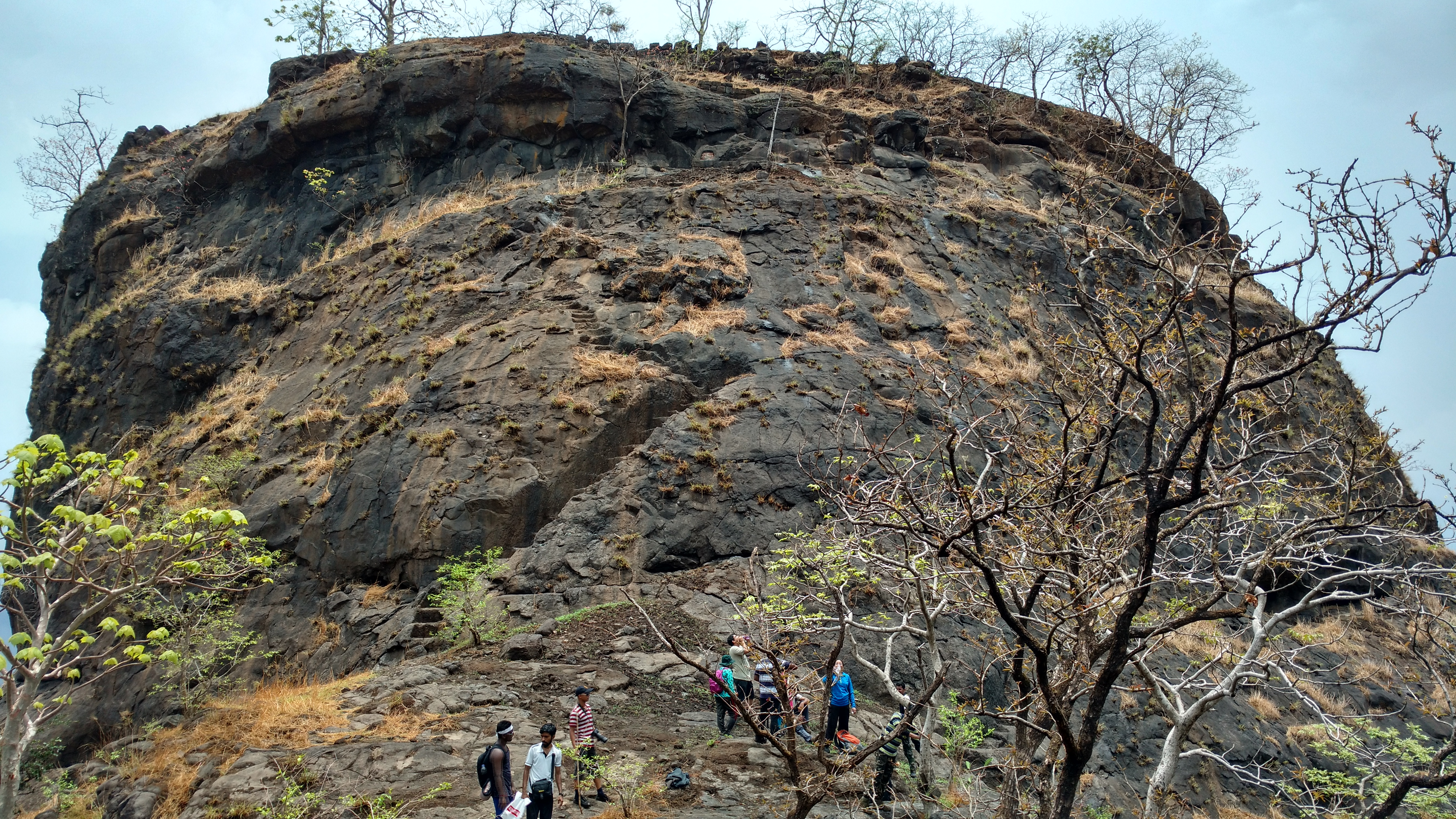
The rock cut steps

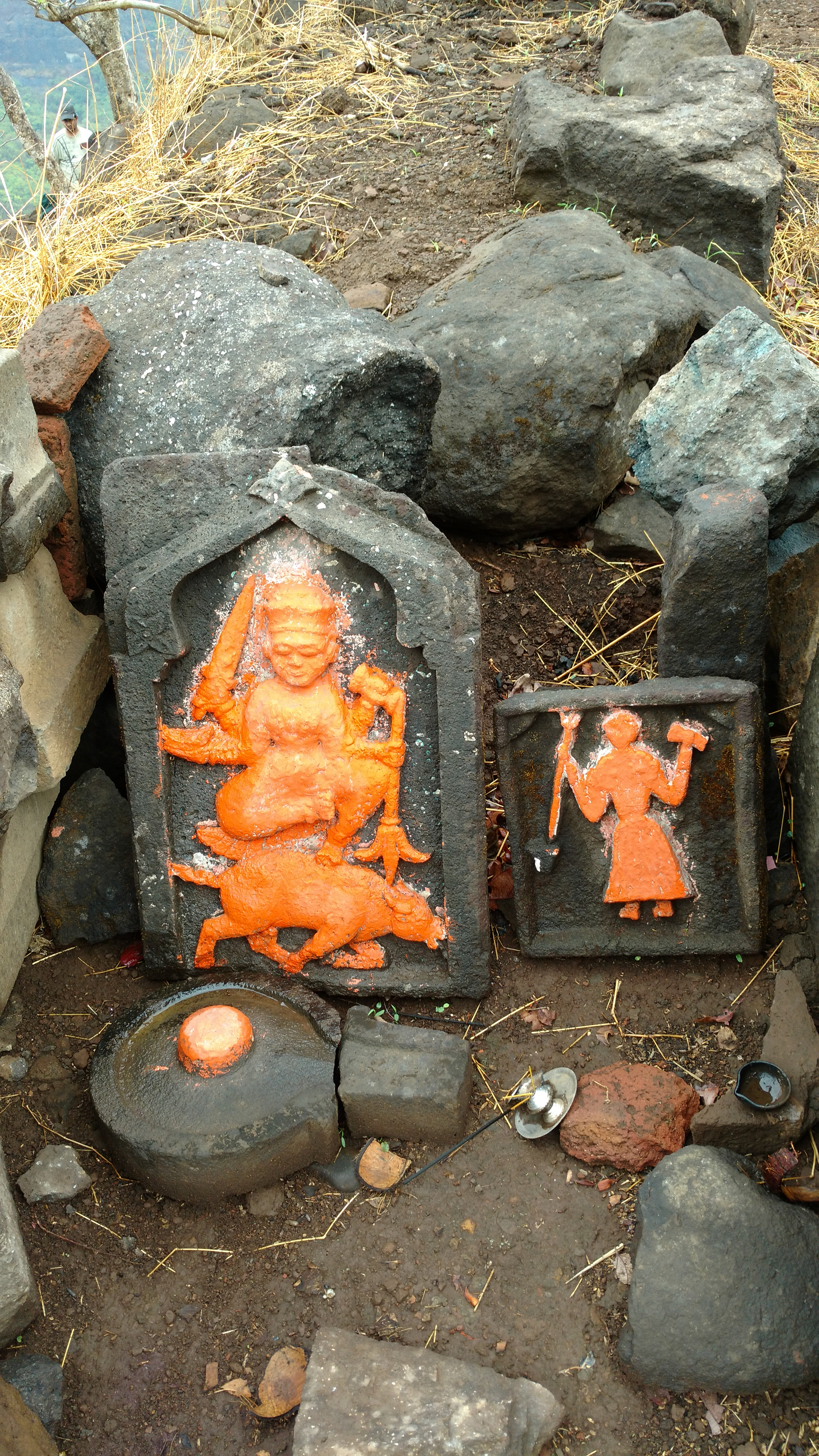
Mahishasurmardini

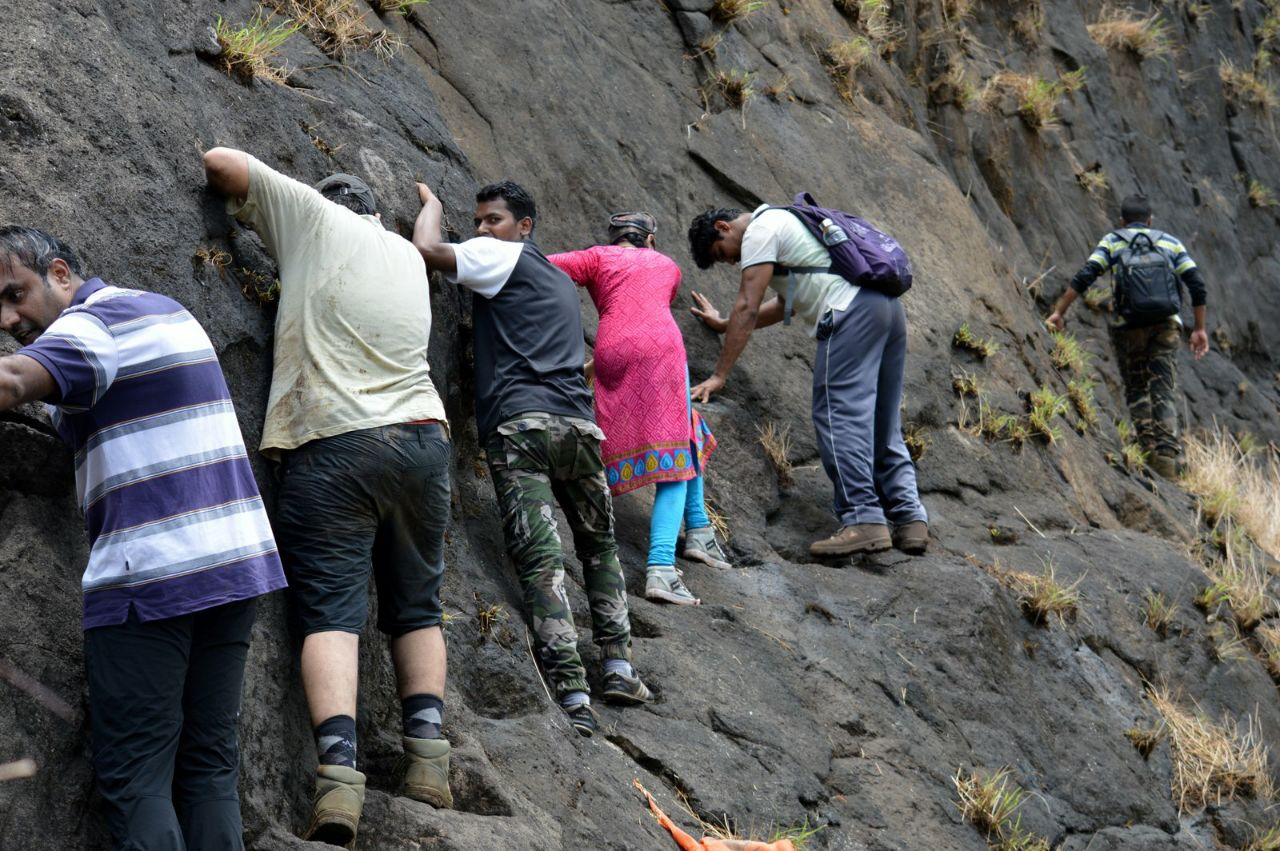
The way to the cave
