= Gangawali =

- Village
- Location in Karnataka, India Gangawali (India)
- Coordinates: 15.596047°N 74.509785°E
- Country: India
- State: Karnataka
- District: Belgaum
- Talukas: Khanapur

Languages
  - Official: Kannada
- Time zone: UTC+5:30 (IST)

Gangawali is a village in Belgaum district in the southern state of Karnataka, India. Gangawali is one of the historical places in Mysore. The place called 'Gangoli' or 'Gangavali' is located on the Kundapura-Gokarna road, near the confluence of five rivers. It is said to be the ancient 'Panchapsaras' confluence, but now it is considered a sacred place in its pilgrimage form.
