= Bhorgiri Fort =

Ancient Indian fort

- Pune district, Maharashtra

Site information
- Type: Hill fort
- Owner: Government of India
- Controlled by: United Kingdom: East India Company (1818-1857); British Raj (1857-1947); India (1947-)
- Open to the public: Yes
- Condition: Ruins

Location
- Shown within Maharashtra
- Location within Maharashtra Location within India
- Coordinates: 19°02′58.4″N 73°34′06.4″E
- Height: 2000 Ft.

Site history
- Materials: Stone

Bhorgiri Fort is a fort in Pune district near to Bhimashankar in the Indian state of Maharashtra.

== Location ==
The fort is located about 95 km from Pune. The nearest town is Rajgurunagar (Khed). This fort is also about 45 km west of the Rajgurunagar town on a small hill detached from the Bhimashankar Hill. The fort is situated near the village Bhorgiri. The fort hill is flanked on both sides by Bhima river and a small tributary of the Bhima river.

== Places to see ==
There are many caves and shiva lingams on the fort. The structures on the fort are now shrub-covered ruins. There is a stone idol of the god Virabhadra on the fort.

== History ==
Very little history of this fort is known. Similar to the Padargad fort in Karjat side of the ancient trade route linking Konkan with the Pune region, this fort was also used as a surveillance fort on the Pune side.
