= Javlya fort =

Javlya Fort
- जवळ्या किल्ला (transliterated: Javḷyā Killā)
- Part of Ajintha Satmal Hill Range
- Nashik district, Maharashtra

Site information
- Type: Hill fort
- Owner: Tiwari Family
- Controlled by: Mughal Empire(1636-1670); Maratha Empire (1670-1818); United Kingdom: East India Company (1818-1857); British Raj (1859-1947); India (1947-)
- Open to the public: Yes
- Condition: in ruins

Location
- Shown within Maharashtra Javlya Fort (India)
- Coordinates: 20°22′27″N 73°57′27.1″E
- Height: 4055 ft.

Site history
- Materials: Stone

Javlya Fort (Marathi: जवळ्या किल्ला, Hindi: जवळ्या किला, (transliteration: Marathi-"Javḷyā Killā and Hindi: Javḷyā Kilā or Qilā) is located 43 km from Nashik, Nashik district, of Maharashtra. Javlya fort and Ravlya fort are twin forts located on a single hill plateau, Ravlya on the west and Javlya on the east side of the hill plateau.

== History ==
The fort was positioned to overlook the trade route from Khandesh to Nashik. The twin forts are also named as "Rola-Jola" forts. In 1636 this fort was won by Alivardi Khan for the Mughal emperor Shah Jahan. In 1670 this fort was won by Chhatrapati Shivaji Maharaj Bhosale. In 1671, Diler Khan encircled the fort with Moghul Army but, was defeated. However, Mahabat Khan captured this fort. This fort was under the Peshwas for a long time until the British forces captured it in 1818. In 1819, Captain William Mackintosh destroyed the steps, bastion and the walls of the fort making the ascent of the fort impracticable.

== How to reach ==
There are regular buses from Nashik to Wani. The cole ahead of the base village Babapur can be reached easily by bus. It takes about 5 hours to see both the forts.

== Places to see ==
The greater part of the fort is enclosed by wall with a single gate with Ganesh idol. There are rock-cut water cisterns, an inscription at the gate to be seen on the fort.

== See also ==
- List of forts in Maharashtra
- List of Maratha dynasties and states
- Maratha War of Independence
- Mughal Empire
