= Vandan Fort =

Fort in Satara, Maharashtra

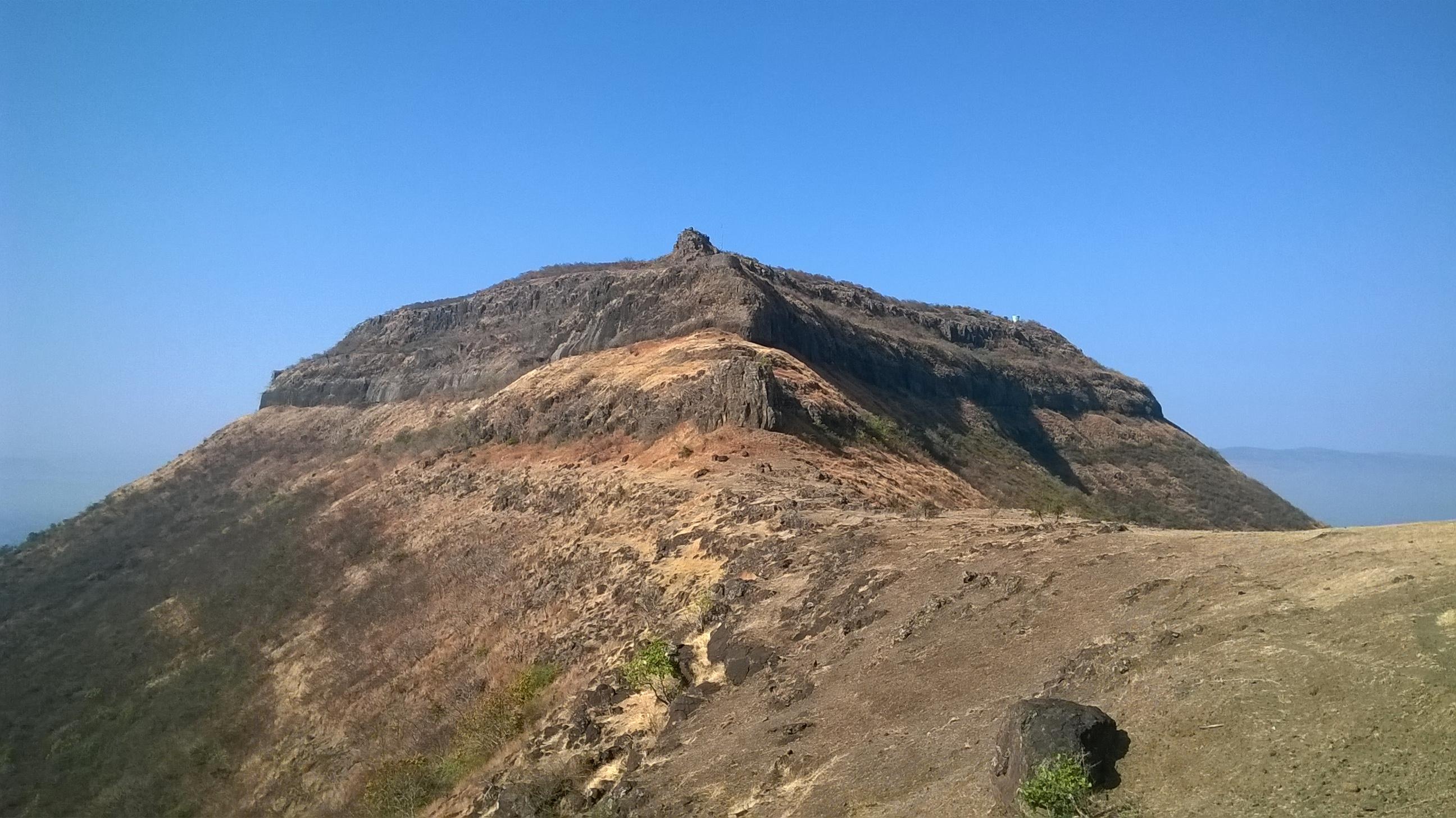

Highest point
- Elevation: 3,800 ft (1,200 m)
- Coordinates: 17°50′20.7″N 74°02′05.3″E

Geography
- Location within Maharashtra
- Location: Maharashtra, India
- Parent range: Western Ghats

Climbing
- Easiest route: Hike

Vandan Fort (Marathi: वंदन किल्ला) is located in Satara District. This fort is situated on a hilly spur from the main ridge of Sahyadri. This fort is frequently visited by trekkers and pilgrims. The villages at the base are rich in sugarcane and other cultivation. The Chandan and Vandan are adjacent forts. The trek to both the fort can easily be completed in a day.

== Places of interest ==
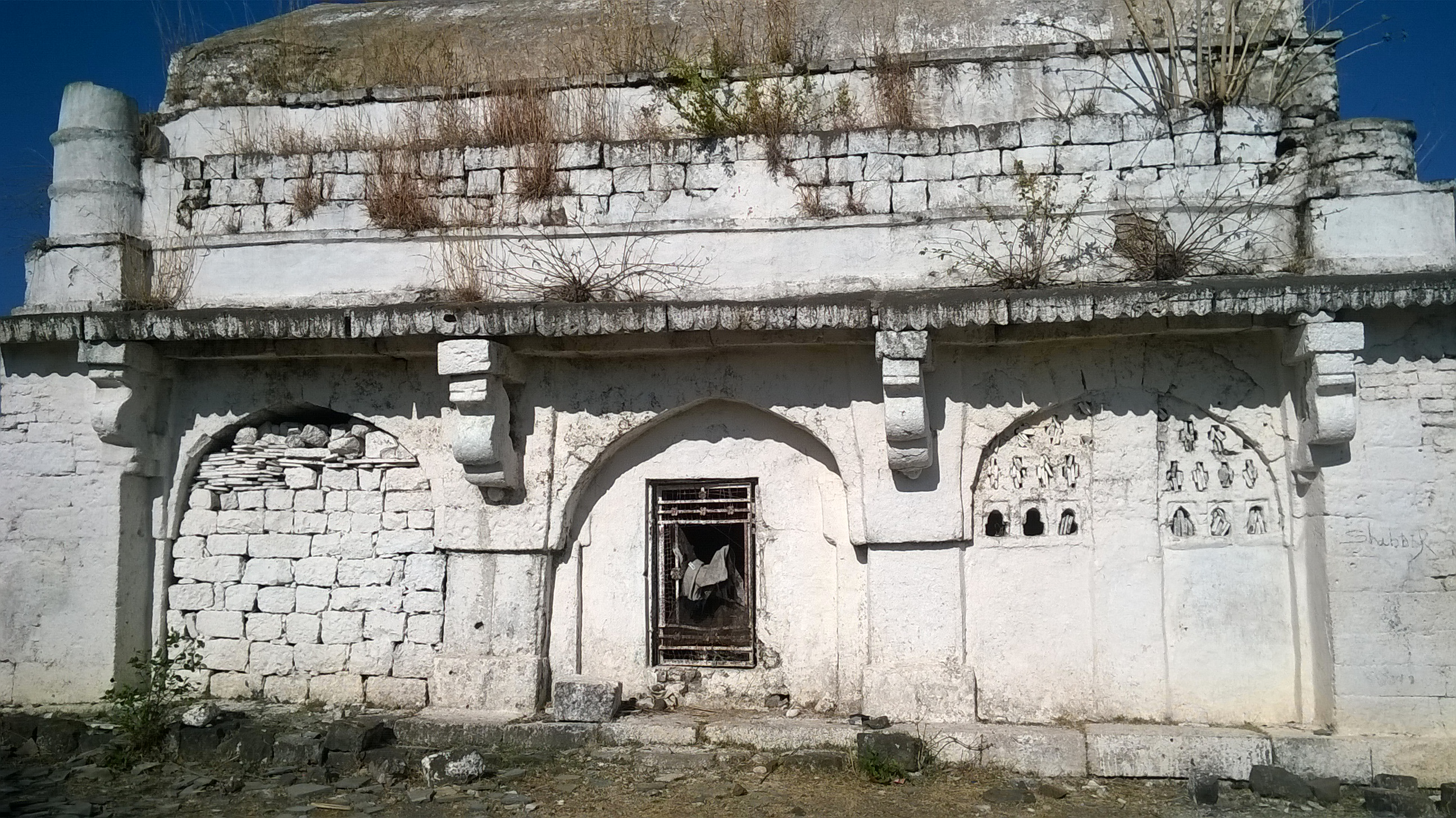
Dargah

The fort is in good condition. The main entrance gate is in good condition, There is a Dargah, water cistern and bastion on the fort. The path on the fort passes through scrubby vegetation. There are few rooms built for the sentries at the gate. On the southern part of the fort is a Dargah built in stone. There is a structure with three rooms called Sarkarwada with three rooms. There is an Inscription in Arabic written on the gate of dargah.

== History ==
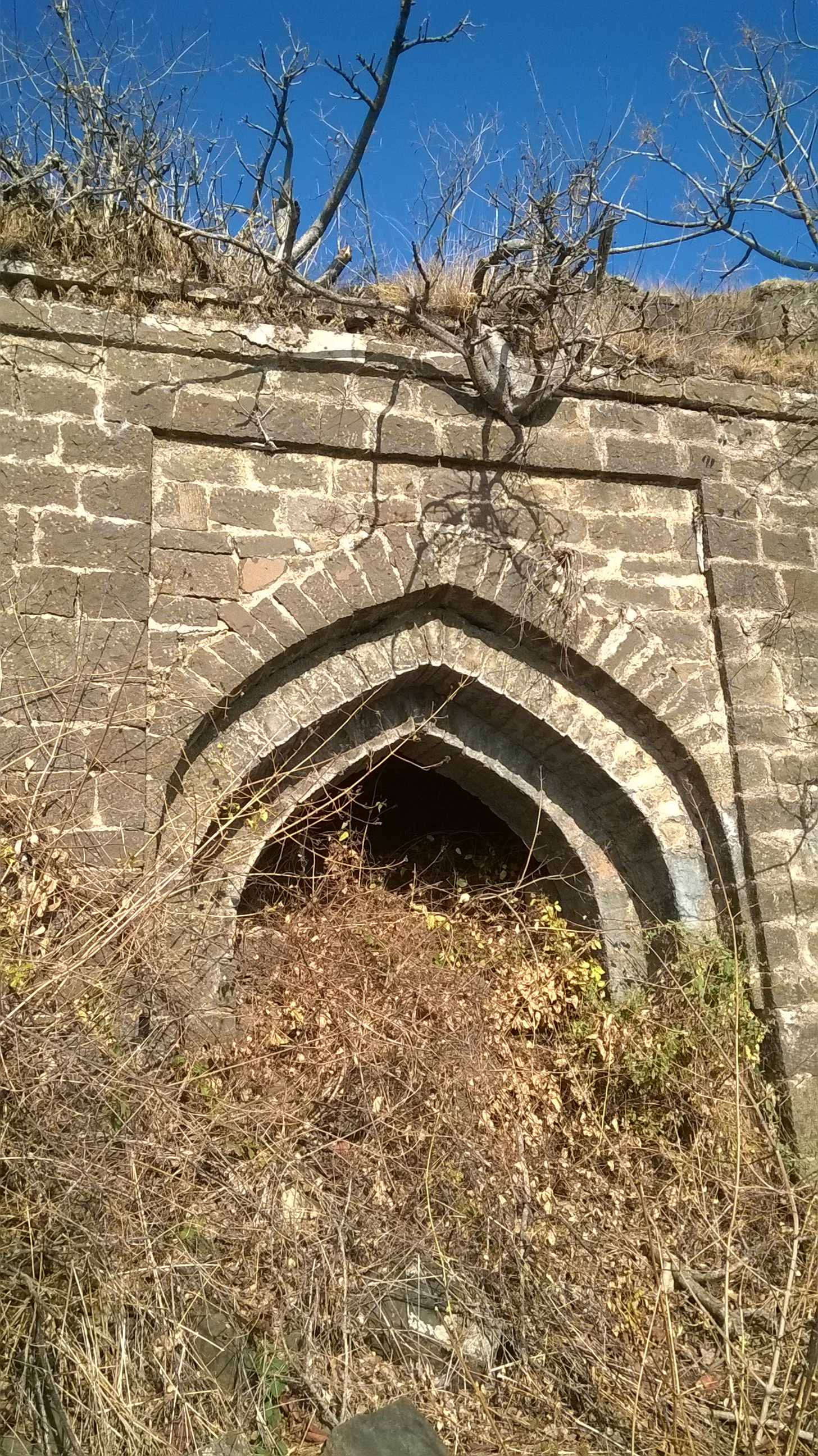
Gate

According to the evidence from the manuscripts found written on copper plates the Chandan and vandan forts were built by King Bhoj-II of Shilahar Dynasty in 1191–1192. King Shivaji won these forts from Adilshah of Bijapur in 1673. It was under control of Marathas until 1689 after it passed in the hand of Moghuls. In 1707, it was won by Chhatrapati Shahu Maharaj.

== How to reach ==
The nearest town is Bhuinj which is 87 km from Pune located on NH-4. There are no good hotels and resorts near the fort. There are three ways to reach the fort. one path starts from the village Kholvadi and another from Ibrahimpur (Banawadi) which is the easiest one and the third one from Belmachi. The road from Bhuinj detours around the fort hill to reach Kholvadi. The vehicles are to be kept in either village and trekking of 1 hr leads to the fort. There are no good potable water bodies on the fort, however, a night stay on the fort is a memorable experience. If planned properly both the forts can be visited in a single day. The way from Pune is shared in the link

== See also ==
- Shivaji
- List of forts in Maharashtra
