= Raireshwar =

- town
- Location in Maharashtra, India
- Coordinates: 18°03′N 73°44′E
- Country: India
- State: Maharashtra
- District: Pune
- Elevation: 1,373 m (4,505 ft)

Languages
  - Official: Marathi
- Time zone: UTC+5:30 (IST)

Raireshwar Fort is in Bhor taluka near Pune, India, 82 km (51 mi) away. It is between various hills and forts, such as Kenjalgad. In the Maratha Empire age, it was a significant fort.

Rairashwar is known for its seven-coloured soil (mine with seven colour rocks which made this soil), which has evoked the interest of geologists.

== Temple ==
Raireshwar has a temple famous for its historical importance. The temple is very old and of stone structure, but it was later re-constructed in the 18th century. The temple is on a plateau, with many beautiful flowers; during monsoon, it is the best time to visit.

Chatrapati Shivaji Maharaj took the oath of the foundation of ‘Hindavi Swarajya’ at Shri Raireshwar temple on Chaitra Shu. In 1645, Saptami and his companion Mavalas went against the invasive foreign dynasties of that time. Hence, Raireshwar holds special importance as the origin of Hindavi Swarajya.

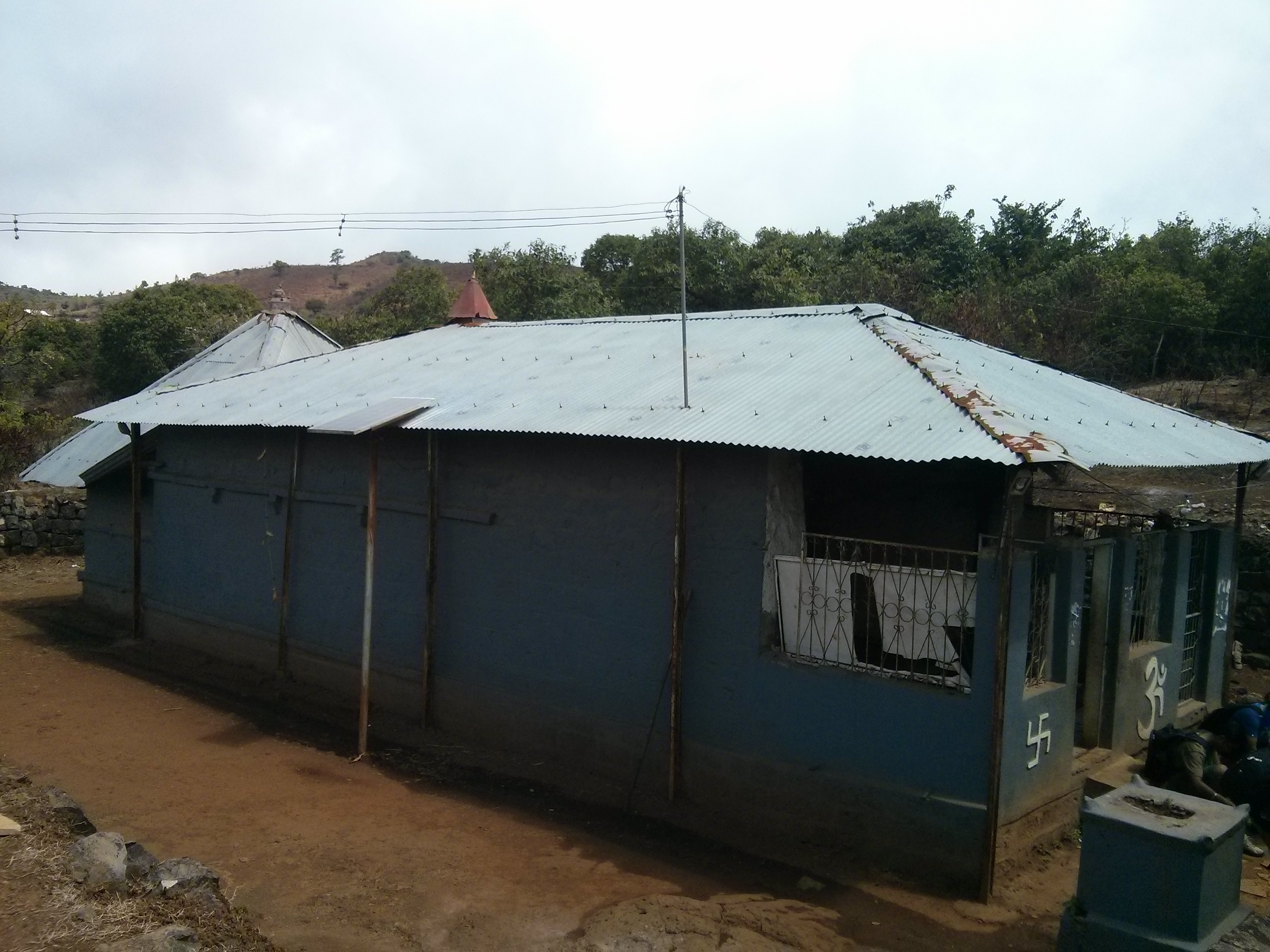
Raireshwar temple

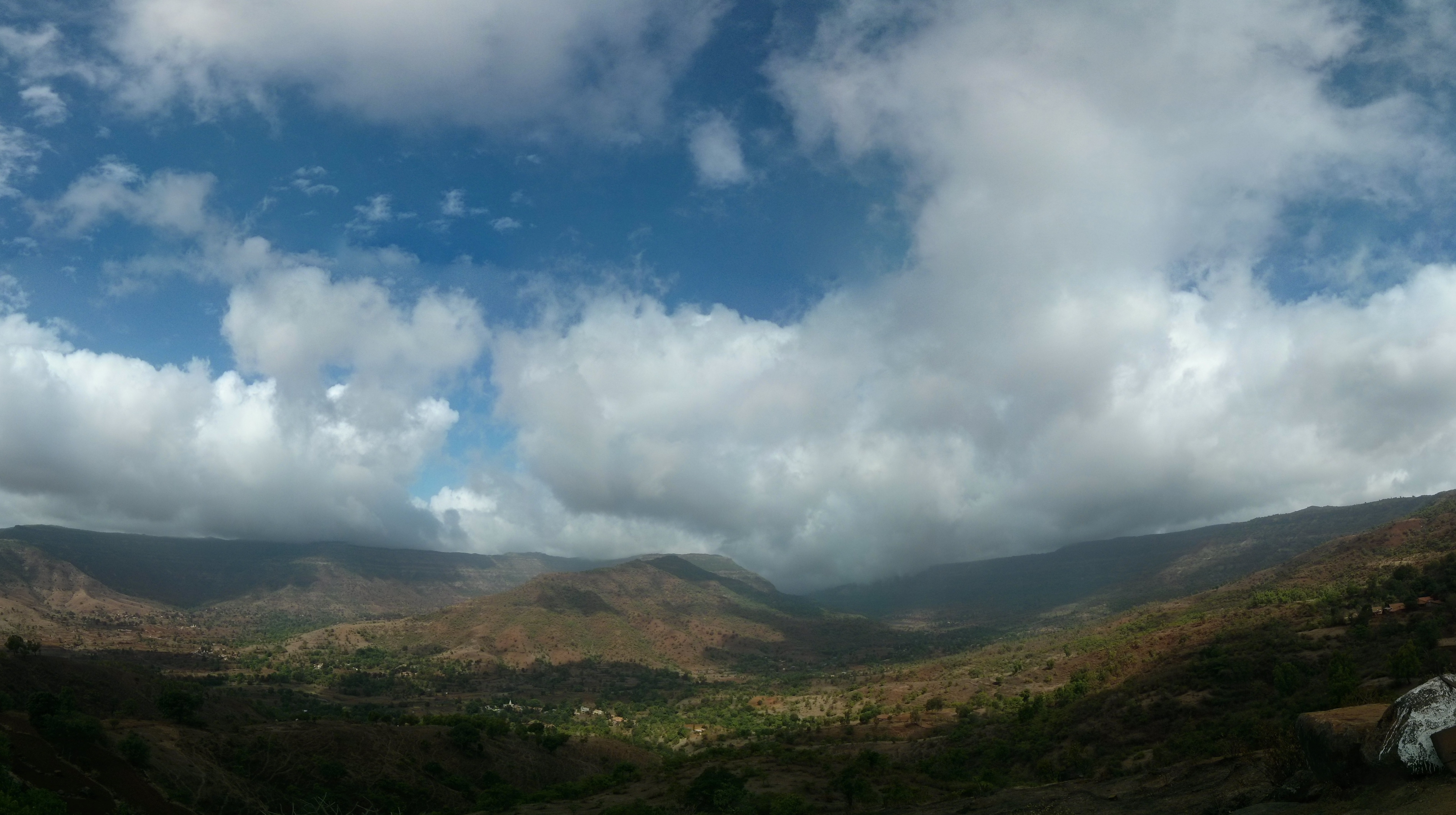
Panorama View from Raireshwar

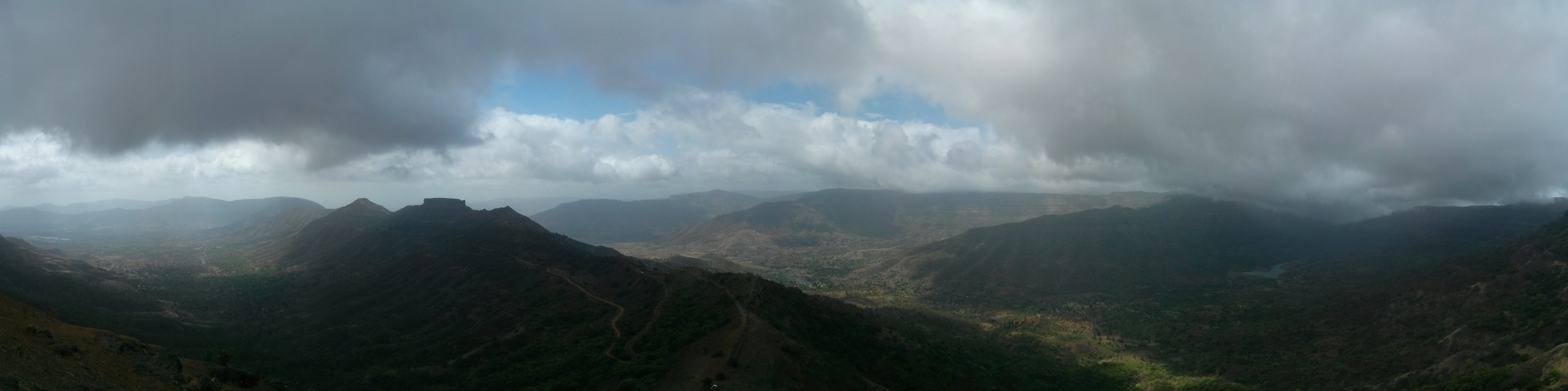
Panorama View from Raireshwar with Kenjalgad on left.

== Tourism ==
The Raireshwar plateau in Pune's Bhor Taluka is renowned for its historical significance and is a popular tourist and trekking destination in Maharashtra. The location is easily reachable by private or public transportation and is 80 kilometres from Pune. In Raireshwar fort camping is available. The places worth visiting in Raireshwar are Raireshwar Mandir, Gomukh Lake, Nakhinda (also known as Aswal Lake) and Pandavleni.
