= Fort Jadhavgadh =

Fort in Pune District of Maharashtra, India

Coordinates: 18.395°N 74.003°E

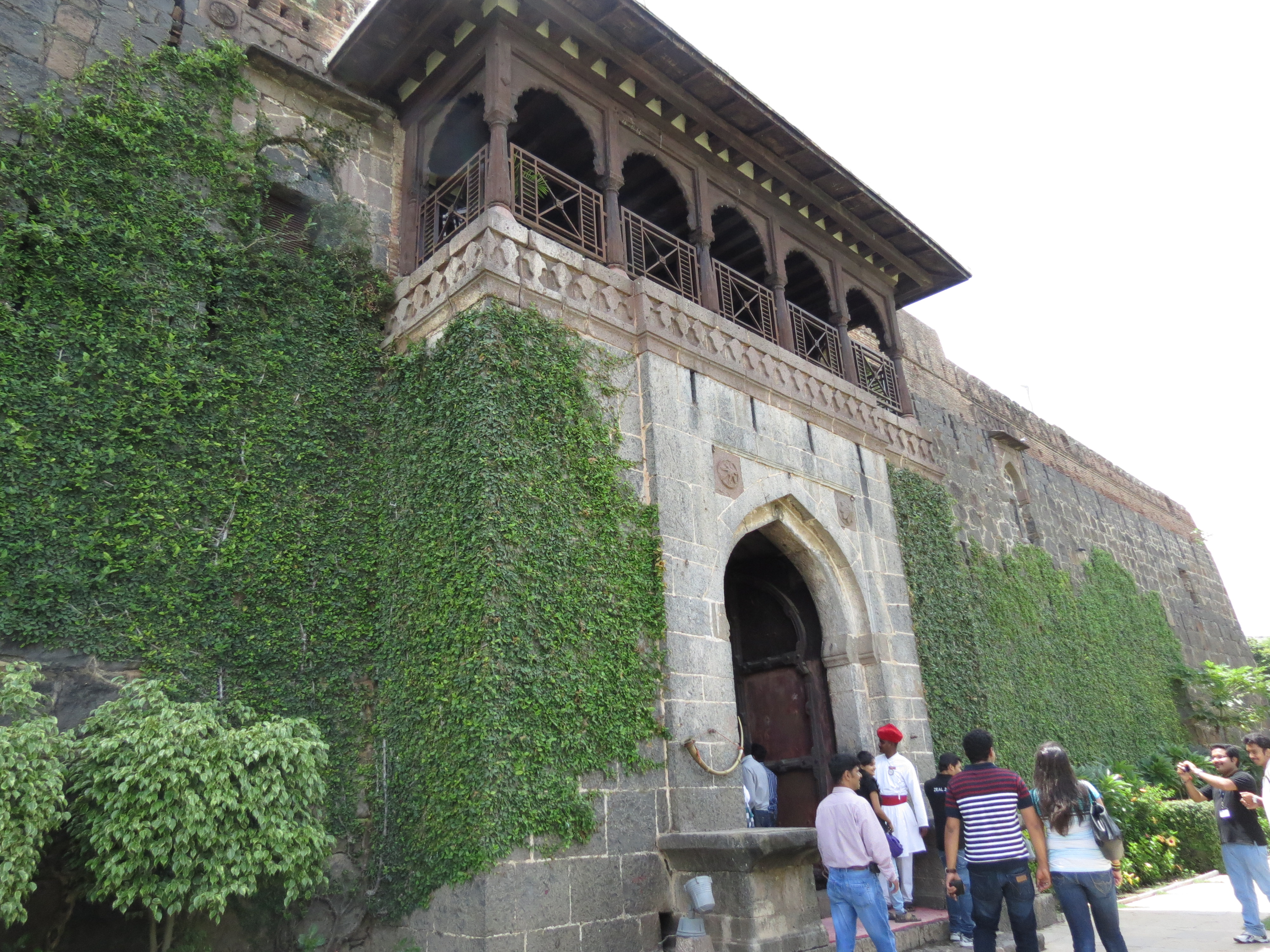
Fort Jadhavgarh, Pune

Fort Jadhavgarh is an 18th century fort, located in Pune, India. It was called Jadhavgadi, a mini fort built in 40 acre land three hundred years ago by Pilaji Jadhav a Maratha Lieutenant of Peshwa, Balaji Rao, in Pune, India

In 2007, the Jadhav Family handed over the remains of Fort Jadhavgadh, a seven storey Mughal style structure with two underground, now spread over only 4.5 acres to Khil in 2007 for restoration and development. Since then, the group with focus on ecology has redeveloped the historic site into a heritage and luxury retreat. Hundreds of travellers can be seen enjoying modern hospitality with a historical experience year after year. The fort located in Pune District of India has now become a heritage destination for history enthusiasts and tourists alike.

== History ==
A conservationist pointed out that the fort was a fortified residence of Pilaji who lived in the times of Shahu Maharaj, the grandson of Chhatrapati Shivaji.The Fort displays Maratha craftsmanship of the period. after handover by the descendants of the Pilaji Jadhavrao.

== Architecture ==
Maratha legacy is best represented for the connoisseurs of history through architecture. The current management has taken due care to maintain sanctity of the original structures: Pilaji Darwaza, door named in the name of Pilaji the great Maratha, Maha Darwaza, (the main entrance to the fort), the doors faces the easternly direction, Gadhicha Darwaza (gad means Fort is Marathi language , fort door used for military purposes), Kund Darwaza, and Purandar darwaja (door facing the Purandar Fort). Maratha used wood work to decorate these doors based on the location of hills. Each offers the glimpse of remarkable Indian history and the Maratha Empire's influence.

The now has been converted into a holiday destination. The sturdy fortress ad-measuring 25 acres was remade into a classical resort by an entrepreneur Vithal K. The architecture of Fort Jadhavgadh symbolises the mixture of historical and traditional elements. The fort includes cannons, dungeons, gun holes, secret passages, and escape routes.

As you enter the fort, you encounter massive staircase of stone. The refurbished fort areas have continued to be named as in the 18th Century: Kund (place for swimming), Chhajja, ( place for dining ), and Kholis, ( rooms for visitors). Additionally, Prangan, Panchayat, and Gurukul serve as public spaces, highlighting the fort's political significance.

As one enters the fort, one witnesses traditional practices such as Mavala. (Maratha soldiers) dotting the landscape, and the traditional Indian musical instrument, tutari is played to create classical ambience. The managerial staff wears traditional Marathi attire, including the dhoti and nine-yard saree.

== Location ==
Jadhav Wadi, Hadapsar Saswad Road, Pune, Maharashtra, India
