= Vardhangad Fort =

Fortification in Maharashtra, India

- Satara District, Maharashtra, India

Site information
- Owner: Government of India
- Open to the public: Yes

Location
- India
- Coordinates: 17.7258782°N 74.2631901°E
- Height: 457m (1500 ft)

Vardhangad Fort (Khatav T; 17° 40' N, 74° 15' E; RS. Koregaon, 9 m. W; p. 1,686) lies on the Bhadle-Kundla spur of the Mahadev range at a point of it on the boundary between the Koregaon and Khatav Talukas, seven miles north-east of Koregaon and nine miles north-east of Satara.

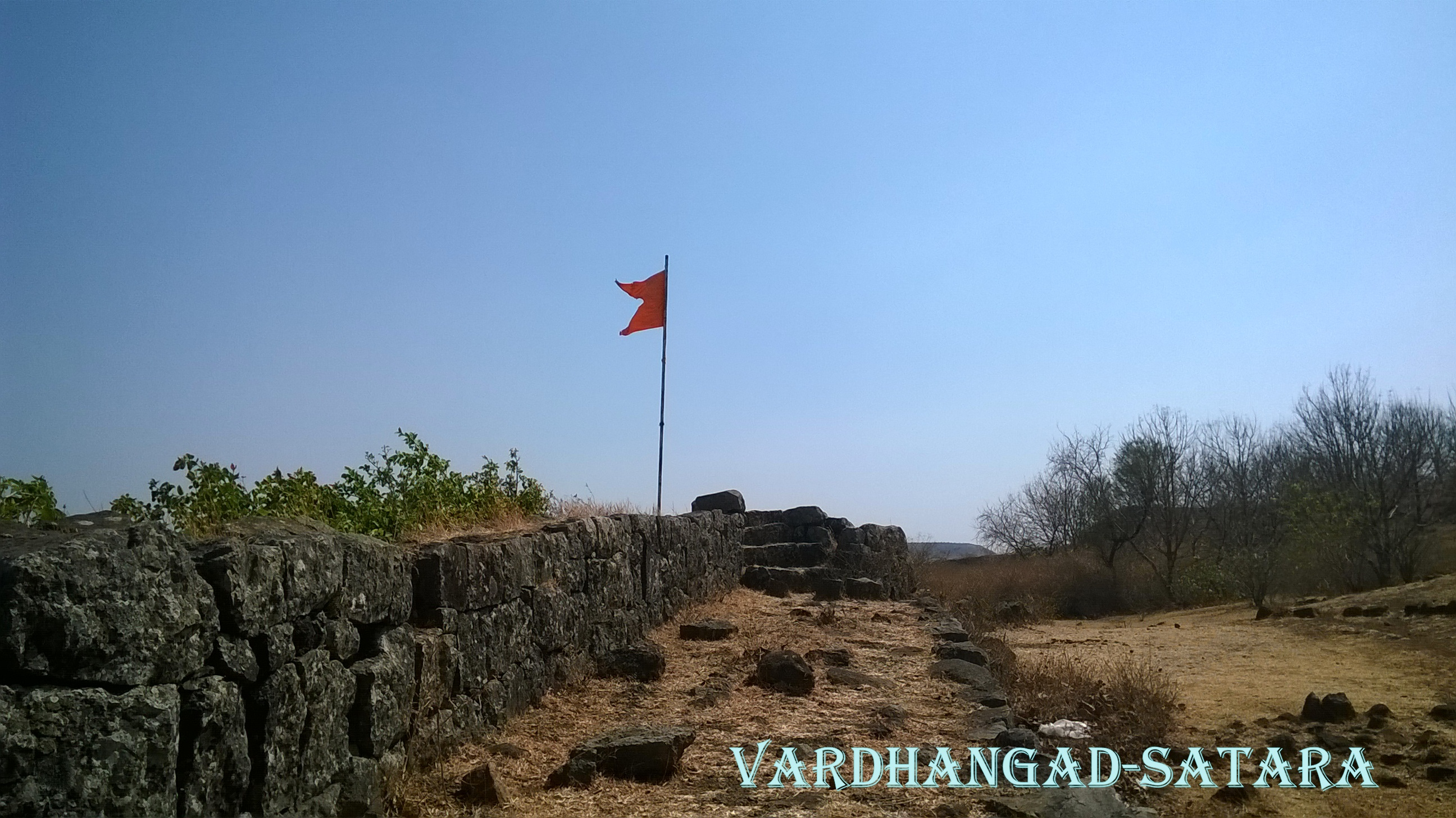
Bastion

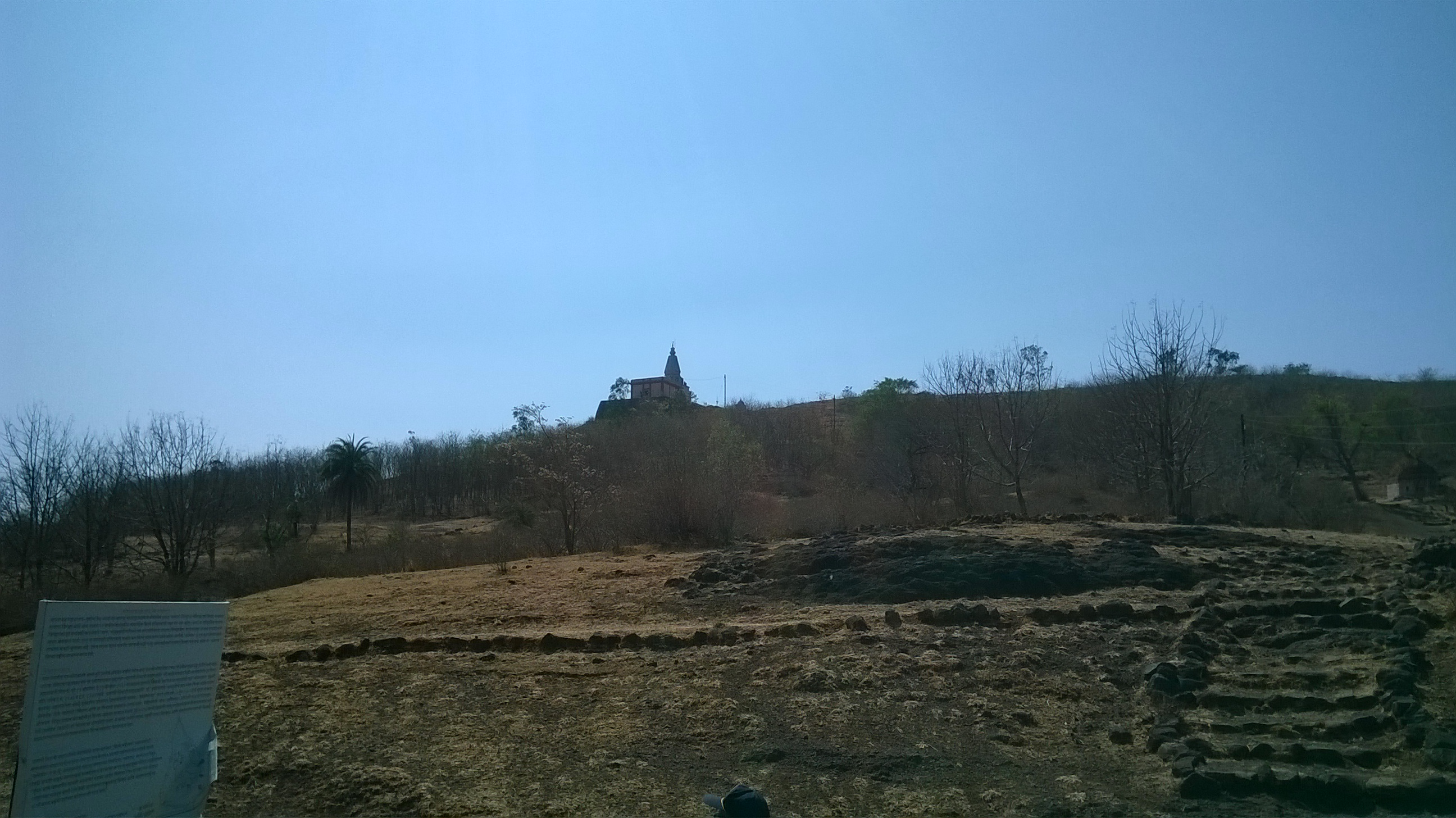
VardhinideviTemple on the fort

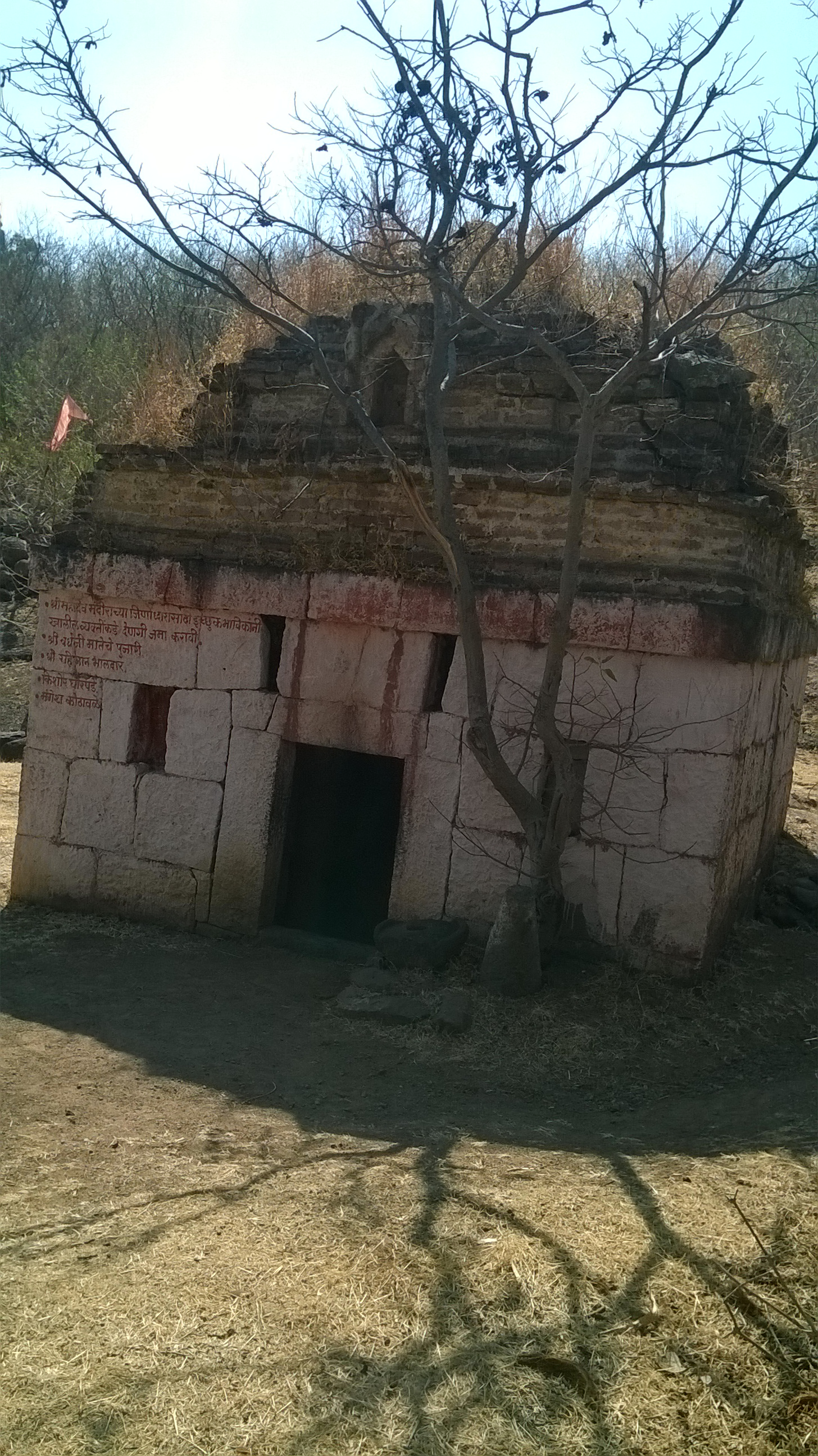
MahdevTemple on the fort

== History ==
The construction of the fort was undertaken in 1673 by Chhatrapati Shivaji Maharaj and was finished in 1674. It was used as an outpost guarding the east frontier of his newly acquired territory. In 1800, the fort, then in the hands of the Pratinidhi, was invested by Mahadji Shinde's force with 25,000 men. The Ramoshis in the south-west machi were attacked and killed the horse of Muzafarkhan one of Shinde's generals. The machis were then sacked and burnt. Further havoc was stopped by the influence of the Sarnobat Ghorpade's wife who was sister to the wife of Shinde. In 1805, the fort was attacked by Fattesingh Mane. The Killedar karkhanis resisted however in the later period Karkhanis and other officers were killed and Fattesingh took many horses in the neighbourhood. But was himself killed soon afterwards in a battle fought with Balvantrav Phadnis, the Mutalik of pratinidhi who was assisted by the troops of Chintamanrav Patwardhan. [Grant Duffs Marathas, Vol. II, 413.] In 1807, after the battle of Vasantgad, [Grant Duff's Marathas, Vol. II, 413.] Bapu Gokhale brought the Pant Pratinidhi to Cimanganv, a Koregaon village close to the north of the fort, and the fort was then surrendered to him. He administered it for five years till 1811 when the Peshva took charge of it. [Papers in possession of the fort Sabnis.] It appears to have surrendered in 1818.

== Ways to reach ==
It is a round-topped hill rising about 900 feet above the plain below on the west or Koregaon side and about 700 feet on the east or Khatav side. The ascent to the fort is from a machi or hamlet at its foot on the Khatav side. This is easily reached from the Satara-Pandharpur road, which winds up the southern slope of the fort hill to a hill close to which on the north lies the fort hamlet. The way takes off from Maruti temple in Vardhangad village. The approach to the fort can be made also from the village Pachangane-vadi. Both ways are easy. The top of the fort can be reached within 15 to 20 minutes. There is also an approach from Cimangaon. As one climbs halfway, one meets with an image of Maruti. A legend about this Maruti is that he brings relief to the person who is bitten by a snake. The person is taken around the image after giving him a juice of Nimb leaves. The person becomes giddy and vomits the poison, according to the legend. Two large ponds attributed to the Musalmans lie about two hundred yards off to the south of the road. The path from the hamlet takes about half an hour to ascend with ease and goes diagonally up the south slope, till it reaches the middle of the south side where is the only gateway reached by a turn to the south-west. The gate is in good condition. The road via koregaon is the road in good condition. The route is shown in the link

== Features ==
After crossing the gate, a little further up one comes across a small temple of Mahadev. The top of the temple is dilapidated. The base of the temple is built of stones and is in good condition. Near the temple is a banyan tree. To the south of the temple are two ponds. The water in them is not potable. As we climb a little further on the left side of the Mahadev temple, there is a temple of Vardhinidevi. On the outer side of the temple is a hall, the roof of which is being repaired by the Grampanchayat. A fair is held here on every Dasara day. Outside the temple is a dipmal, in front of the standing idol facing east. The base of the temple is built of stone and the upper part is built of bricks. There is an idol of Parashuram in the hall. It is said that, there is a tunnel leading to Mahimangad. The door of the tunnel is now covered with prickly pear and stones. The wall on each side juts out so that the gateway can be sighted only through a narrow passage from the north-east. It consists of a pointed arch and wooden doorway close outside which is shown the mark of a cannon shot fired when the fort was attacked by Fattesingh Mane (1805). The fort sloping all round from the sides to the top is round at the summit, and covers about twenty acres. On the east is a hollow, where are two ponds and the site of the garrison's quarters, now thickly covered with prickly pear, and the buildings in ruins. Only two small guns remain among the rubbish. The fort has but little scarp, the wall crowning a ridge of black rock protruding abruptly from the sides of the hill which though steep are covered with loose shallow soil. The walls with parapet vary from ten to fifteen feet on the outside, and follow the contour of the ridge, the hollows being filled up with strong masonry. They are about sixteen and a half feet thick, with a parapet, two feet high on the inside. The height is generally about six feet from the ground close under them. The ground rises so abruptly behind them that at any distance they would give no shelter, and the fort is commanded on the north from a hill in Lalgun, and on the south from the hill of Rameshvar, each about 2,000 yards distant, with perfectly possible ascents at any side. The masonry of the walls is mostly small and put together with mortar only in a few places. The gate and its neighbourhood are the strongest points. The fort wall has fallen in a number of places. On the north side is an empty pond. The east is the only side where water is constantly found, but that is small quantities.
