= Rangana Fort =

- Part of Sahyadri Hill Range
- Kolhapur district, Maharashtra

Site information
- Type: Hill fort
- Owner: Government of India
- Open to the public: Yes
- Condition: Ruins

Location
- Shown within Maharashtra
- Coordinates: 16°04′39″N 73°51′03″E
- Height: 2,227 ft (679 m)

Site history
- Materials: Laterite Stone
- Grade: Medium

Rangana Fort/ Prasiddhagad (Marathi: रांगणा किल्ला) is located in the Bhudargad taluka of Kolhapur district. This fort is one of the important forts in the district. It is located on the Sahyadri mountain ridge, on the boundary of the Sindhudurg and Kolhapur districts.

== History ==
This fort was built by the King Bhoj-II of the Shilahar dynasty in the 12th century. In 1470 this fort was captured by Md. Gavan of Bahamani dynasty. Later it was under the control of Sawant rulers of Adilshahi dynasty. In 1658, the Rustum Jaman, commander-in chief of Adilshah captured it from the Sawants. In December 1664 through a series of surprise attacks, Shivaji defeated the combined forces of Bijapur and the Desais and captured the Rangna Fort. Lakham Sawant and the Desais fled to Portuguese territory. Jijabai undertook a special drive and captured the fort on 15 August 1666. This fort was under the control of Karvir kings until the British took control in 1818.

== Places to see ==
There is a pilgrimage ashram of Mouni on the way from Patgaon village. In the year 1676 Shivaji took blessings from the Maharaj before proceeding for the Southern conquest. After walking for few steps there is an old Bhadrakali temple. There are two gates, a large lake and temple of goddess Ranganai devi on the fort.
