= Dermal Fort =

- डेरमाळ किल्ला
- Part of Galna Hill Range
- Nashik district, Maharashtra

Site information
- Type: Hill fort
- Owner: Government of India
- Open to the public: Yes
- Condition: Ruins

Location
- Shown within Maharashtra
- Location within Maharashtra
- Coordinates: 20°51′08.1″N 74°17′05.7″E
- Height: 3,700 ft (1,100 m)

Site history
- Materials: Stone

Dermal Fort (Marathi: डेरमाळ किल्ला, Hindi: डेरमाल क़िला, transliteration: Dermal Qilа̄)is a fort located 125 mi (201 km) from Nashik, in the Nashik district of Maharashtra, India. Though this fort is an important fort in Nashik district, it is less visited by trekkers. In Satana taluka, there are four forts in a line on the Galna hill range, the Pisola fort, Dermal fort, Kankrala fort and Galna fort. This fort is easy to climb but requires two hour to reach the fort. There are very few remains of old buildings on the fort.

== How to reach ==
The nearest town is Nampur which is 110km from Nashik. The base village of the fort is Tinghari which is 12km from Nampur. There are good hotels at Nampur or Taharabad, and now tea and snacks are also available in small hotels at Nampur. The trekking path starts from the East of the village. The route is very safe and passes through open plateau. There is no marked path which leads to the fort, so it is advisable to hire a local guide from the village. It takes about one and half hour to reach the scarp of the fort. The other route starts from village Bilpuri. There is plenty of water available on the fort.

== Places to see ==
The only structure in good condition is a small gate and few water cisterns on the fort. It takes about one hour to visit all places on the fort. There are stone cut carvings of lord Ganesh and Maruti on the fort. There is a cave wherein 7-8 trekkers can make a night halt.

== See also ==
- List of forts in Maharashtra
- List of forts in India
- Marathi People
- Battles involving the Maratha Empire
- Maratha Army
- Maratha titles
- Military history of India
