= Hargad Fort =

Fort in India

- Nashik district, Maharashtra
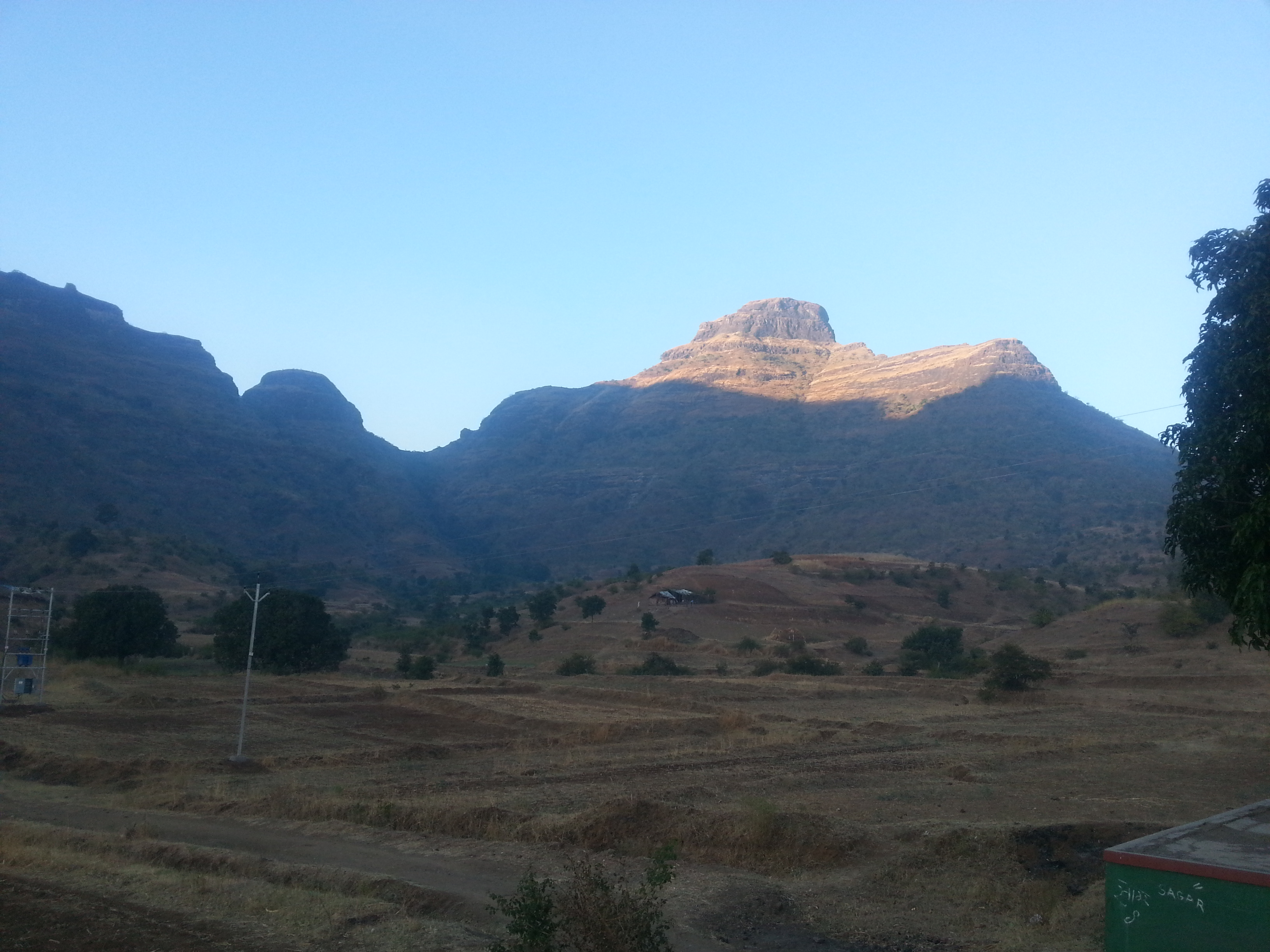
- Hargad fort from Mulher

Site information
- Type: Hill fort
- Owner: Government of India
- Open to the public: Yes
- Condition: Ruins

Location
- Shown within Maharashtra
- Location within Maharashtra
- Coordinates: 20°45′17.8″N 74°02′21.8″E
- Height: 4450 feet

Site history
- Materials: Stone
- Grade: Medium

Hargad Fort is located in the Baglan area of Nashik district. There are two main hill ranges in Baglan area, the Selbari range is south of the Dolbari hill range. These two ranges run parallel to each other in east-west direction. Hargad is located on Selbari hill range. All these forts were maintained to keep watch on the Burhanpur-Surat ancient commercial road. The road passes between the two hill ranges. Hargad fort is a small fort, close to Mulher fort. These are key forts situated between fertile lands of Khandesh and port city of Surat.

== History ==
No separate history is mentioned of this fort. This fort is adjoining the Mulher fort.

== Places to see ==
There are few rock cut cisterns and caves on the fort, There is one 14 feet long cannon lying on the fort. There is no significant construction on the fort. The pathway to the fort is made of rock cut steps. From the top of this fort Mangi-Tungi, Salher, Salota, Mora, Mulher, Nhavigad forts are easily seen.

== How to reach ==
There is a good motorable road up to the base village Mulher. It takes about two hour to reach the col between Mulher and Hargad fort. The path from the col leads to the fort. There are three gates in ruined condition. There is no good water on the fort, so it is advisable to carry enough water. It takes about one hour to climb and see the fort.

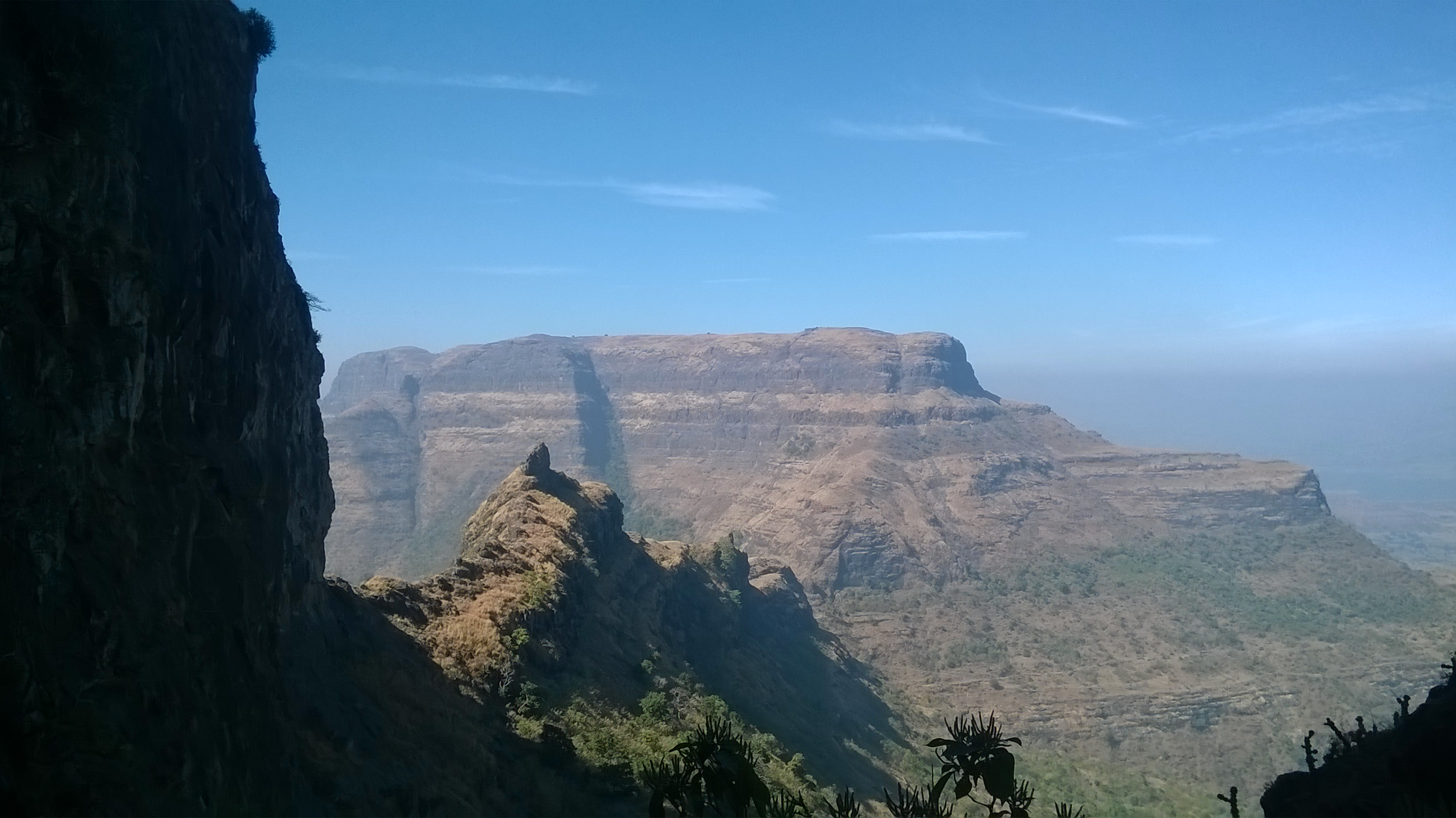
Hargad from Mulher fort

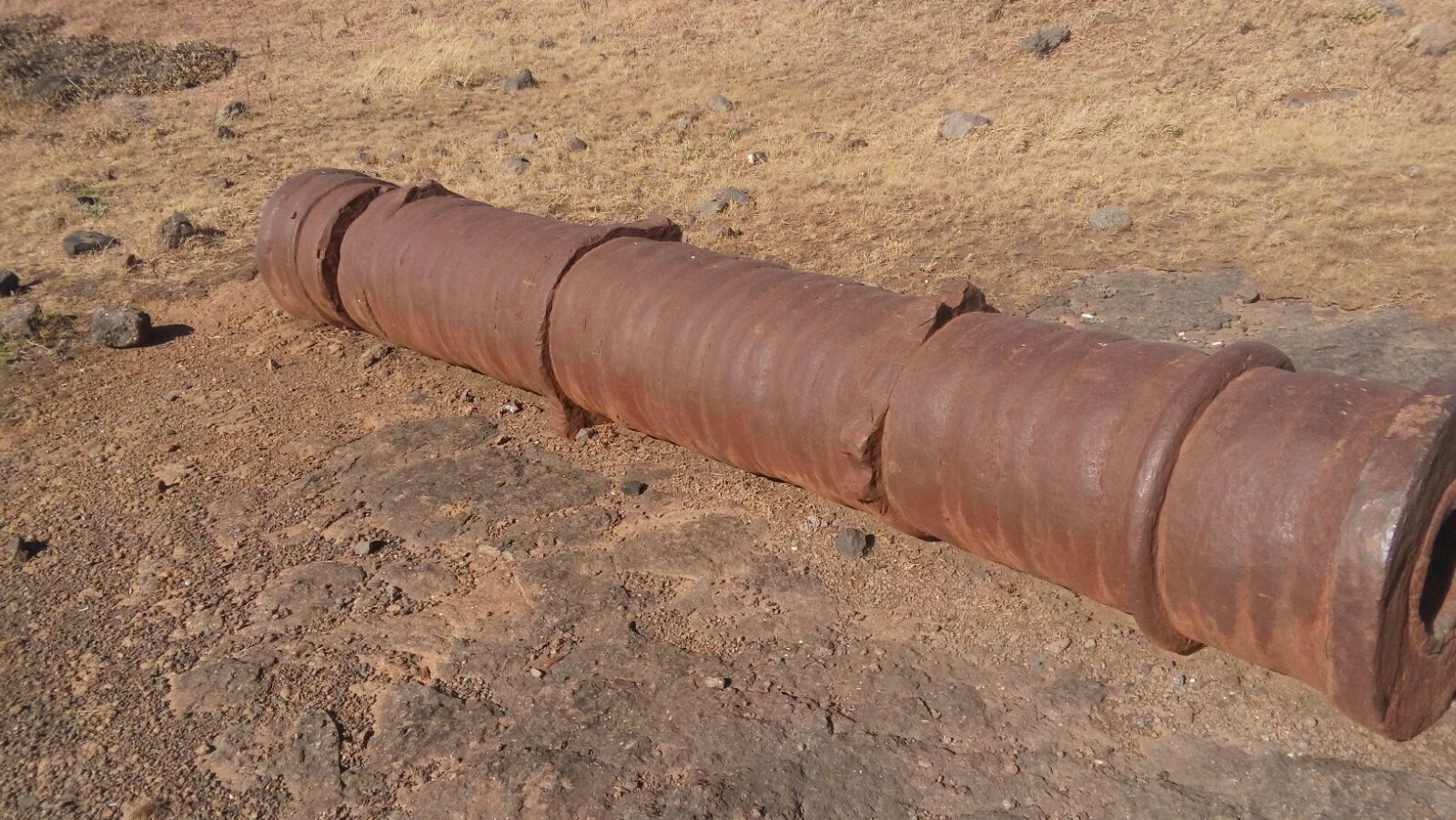
The cannon

== See also ==
- List of forts in Maharashtra
- List of forts in India
- Marathi People
- List of Maratha dynasties and states
- Maratha War of Independence
- Battles involving the Maratha Empire
- Maratha Army
- Maratha titles
- Military history of India
