= Nampur =

Coordinates: 20°43′43″N 74°18′39″E

Nampur is a village in Nashik District of Maharashtra, India. As per census of 2011 by Govt of India It is situated near Satana also called as Baglan Taluka, the headquarters for Baglan Taluka, at the distance of 21 km (13 mi). Nampur is known in the states of Maharashtra, Karnataka and Gujarat for its cattle market. It is near to Gujarat and is a major transportation hub. It is 35 kilometres (22 mi) from the city of Malegaon and 25 kilometres (16 mi) from Taharabad on the road (SH-16) to Gujarat. The first MLA elected from Baglan Taluka was from Tembhe which is just 7 km (4.3 mi) from Nampur.

== Background ==
Being near to Gujarat, Nampur experiences Marathi and Ahirani languages to large extent. The major business of the city is agriculture. Major crops are seasonal Onions, Grapes, Pomegranates (Anar), Wheat, Pearl millet(Bajara), Sorghum(Jowar), Sugar cane. The village is at a distance of approx 15 km (9.3 mi). from the Ravalgaon Sugar Factory and 30 kilometres (19 mi) from GISAKA (girana sakar karkhana).

It comes under the Baglan Legislative Constituency and for Lok Sabha it comes under the Dhule Constituency.

The city is also famous for its "Yatra" (religious fair) held in Feb every year in honor of Mata Bhavani. Jalebi is famous sweet during this fair. It has a Vitthal Mandir, Ram Mandir, every year in marathi month 'आषाढ' there is big fair on occasion of 'आषाढी एकादशी'. and ancient Vyaghreshwar (Self oriented Shree Mahadev)located on the bank of river mosam. Vyghreshwar is also popularly called as 'Motha Mahadev'. Rinmukteshwar (a god who saves us from all debts), Durgamata Mandir. There is also the Nimboleshwar Mandir of lord Ganesha, every year in month of February there is festival of ganesha jayanti.

The city is located on the right (southwest) bank of the Mokshaganga River (Mausam River).

Nampur is nearer to Gujarat for agricultural products such as Pomegranate, Coriander and other crops. There is a chain of historical forts on the hills running westwards they include Salher, Salota, Mora and Mulher are approx 50 km (31 mi) from Nampur. Other places which are nearby Nampur includes - Mangitungi, the holy place for Jains and Mulher, which is considered as a very sacred place for Hindus.

== Demographics ==
In the 2011 census, the village of Nampur had 16748 inhabitants, with 8693 males (51.9%) and 8055 females (48.1%), for a gender ratio of 926 females per thousand males.

Nampur is also well known for the traditional species and "Adkittas", the beetle nut cutters. Beyond this Nampur is famous for the cattle market on Wednesdays. Cows, buffaloes, bullocks, goats from nearly all the species used in Maharashtra are bought and sold here.

== Schools and colleges ==
Nampur has two secondary schools, two junior and senior colleges along with newly opened primary English medium schools. Nampur English School is famous for its value education in nearby villages. Teachers from schools are well known for their contribution and cultivating the values and shaping future engineers and Doctors.
