= Jaikheda =

Village in Maharashtra

- village
- Location in Maharashtra, India Jaikheda (India)
- Coordinates: 20°47′00″N 74°12′00″E
- Country: India
- State: Maharashtra
- District: Nashik
- Elevation: 618 m (2,028 ft)

Languages
  - Official: Marathi
- Time zone: UTC+5:30 (IST)
- Nearest city: Satana

Jaikheda is a village in Indian state of Maharashtra. It is situated in Baglan Taluka in Nashik district.
It is located on the right (south) bank of the Mosam River. The population is about 8,000.

== Underground canal ==
A state highway connecting Malegaon to Pimpalner goes through the village. An underground canal was built between Sompur and Jaikheda under the Maratha Empire. It was built to provide irrigation water for farmland.

== Agricultural sustainability ==
The majority of people in Jaikheda are Farmers. The Black-cotton and mixed type soil is found here. The main crops include

-Sugarcane
-Grapes
-Pomegranates
-Onions and other vegetables like Chilly, Tomato, Cucumber, etc. Major businesses are related to the transport of goods primarily farm produce. It is the main marketplace for neighboring villages. The main irrigation methods use are Drip irrigation, Sprinkler irrigation and traditional ways etc.

== Pilgrim village ==
A village of Hari Bhakt Parayan Let. Shree Krishanji Mauli, Thousands of people visited in Jaikheda on the day of Diwali for "Samadhi Darshan". Every year one of the Big and disciplined Dindi is started from Jaikheda village. So many other temples in village and with good condition like, Hanuman Mandir, Mahadev Mandir, Shani Mandir, Datta Mandir, Swami Samarth Temple, Mauli Samadhi Mandir, Siddheshwar Temple, Vittal Mandir, Navanath Temple.

To protect women and children in the village, CC TV Cameras have been installed to prevent thieves. "Warkari Sampradaya" is the foundation of the great culture of this village. On Ekadashi day, there is a Kirtan on the Mauli Samadhi in the village

 The jaikheda village is also called as "KrushnaNagari"
