= Kashti, Nashik =

Village in Maharashtra, India

Kashti
- village
- Location in Maharashtra, India Kashti (India)
- Coordinates: 20°37′20″N 074°28′59″E
- Country: India
- State: Maharashtra
- District: Nashik
- Taluka: Malegaon

Government
  - Body: Village panchayat
- Time zone: UTC+5:30 (IST)

Kashti is a panchayat village in the state of Maharashtra, India. Administratively, Kashti is under Malegaon Taluka of Nashik District in Maharashtra. Kashti is the only village in its gram panchayat. The village is located on the right (southwest) bank of the Mausam River (Mosam River), 29 km by road southeast of the village of Nampur, and 37 km by road north-northwest of the city of Malegaon.

== Demographics ==
In the 2001 census, the village of Kashti had 2,102 inhabitants, with 1,063 males (50.6%) and 1,039 females (49.4%), for a gender ratio of 977 females per thousand males.
