= Moragarh Durg Ka Itihas =

Book by Dr. Ramji Lal Koli

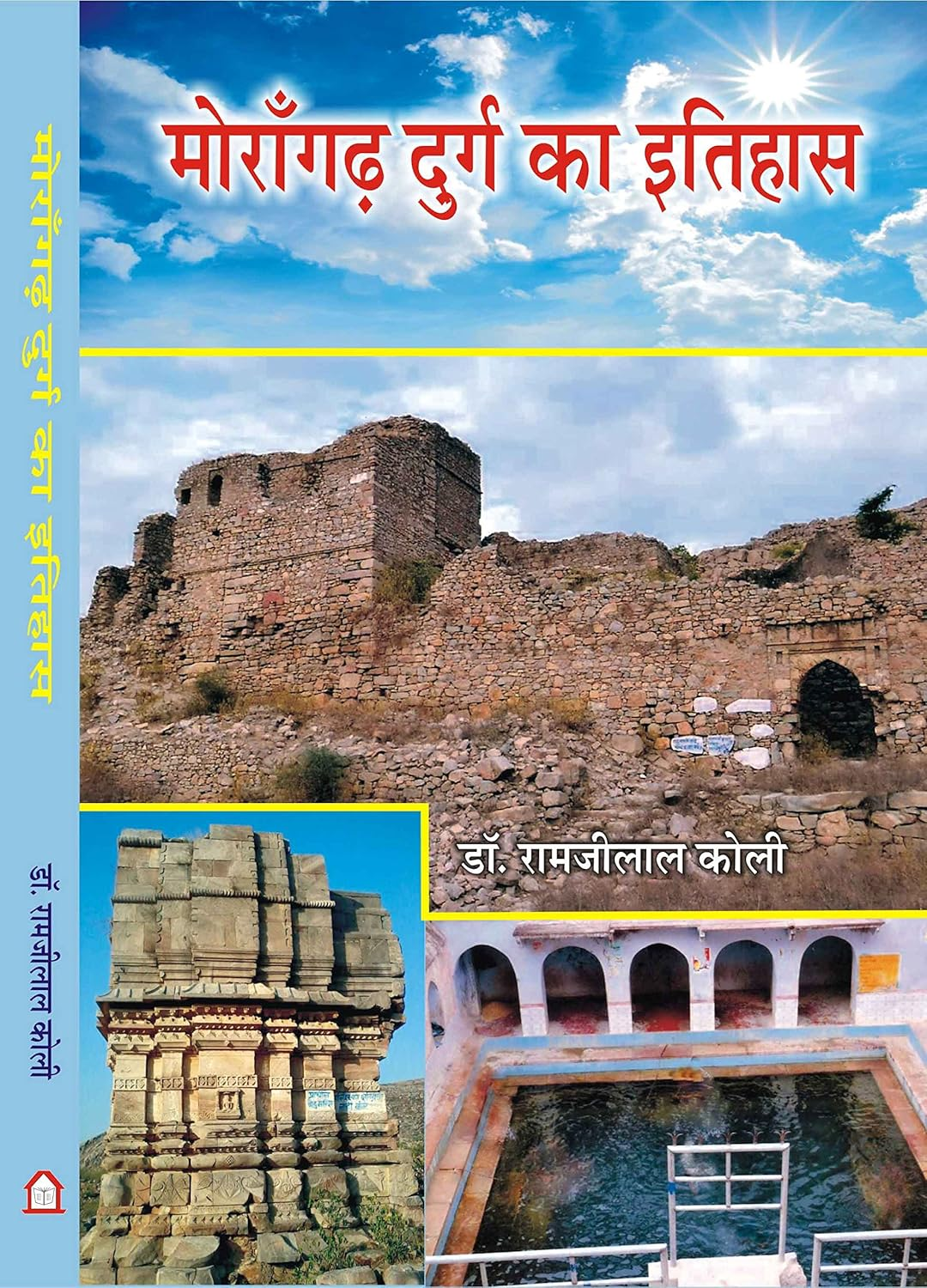
- The History of Moragarh Fort
- Author: Dr. Ramji Lal Koli
- Original title: मोँरागढ़ दुर्ग का इतिहास
- Language: Hindi
- Genre: Archeological
- Publisher: Sahityagar Publications
- Publication date: 01 January 2016
- Publication place: India
- Media type: Hardcover
- ISBN: 978-8-177-11552-9

Moragarh Durg Ka Itihas (Hindi: मोँरागढ़ दुर्ग का इतिहास; English: The History of Moragarh Fort) is a historical research book authored by Dr. Ramji Lal Koli, an Indian archaeologist and historian. The book presents a detailed study of the Moragarh Fort, located in Gadhmora Village , Nadauti , Rajasthan, India, focusing on its architectural features, historical background, and cultural significance.

== Historical Background ==
Moragarh Fort is an Ancient Historical Fort situated on Rajket Hills of Aravalli Mountain Range . Geographically , It is Located in Gadhmora Village of Nadauti Tehsil of Karauli district of Rajasthan State and 30km away from Lalsot & 85km away from Jaipur District HQ in Rajasthan. It is famous for its intricate stone carvings, ruined temples, and local legends surrounding Water Treasure and the mythical Mora Sagar Talab .

== Subject Matter ==
Moragarh Fort, situated in Gadhmora Village of Nadauti Tehsil of Karauli District in Rajasthan, is an important example of medieval Indian fort architecture. The book traces:

- The origins and construction of the fort .
- Its role in regional politics and defense strategies .
- Accounts of rulers and dynasties associated with the fort .
- The fort’s decline and preservation challenges in modern times .

== Significance ==
The book highlights the fort’s cultural and historical importance:

- Architectural heritage: Detailed descriptions of fort walls, gateways, temples, and water reservoirs.
- Cultural impact: The fort as a center of local traditions, folklore, and community identity.
- Historical relevance: Its role in shaping the socio‑political landscape of the region.

== Contents ==
📖 Table of Contents :

- Preface / Prologue
- Chapter 1 : History & Geography of Moragarh ( or Mora-Nagar )
- Chapter 2 : Archeological Studies of Moragarh ( or Mora-Nagar )
- Chapter 3 : Cultural Studies of Moragarh ( or Mora-Nagar )
- Chapter 4 : Moragarh after Indian Independence
- Chapter 5 : Spirituality & Tourism in Mora-Nagari
- Bibliography
- Appendix

== See also ==
- Raja Mordhwaj (Main article on the King who built the Fort)
- Mora fort
- Hindaun
- Timangarh Fort
