= Pisola fort =

Fort in India

Pisola Fort
- Part of Galna Hill Range
- Nashik district, Maharashtra
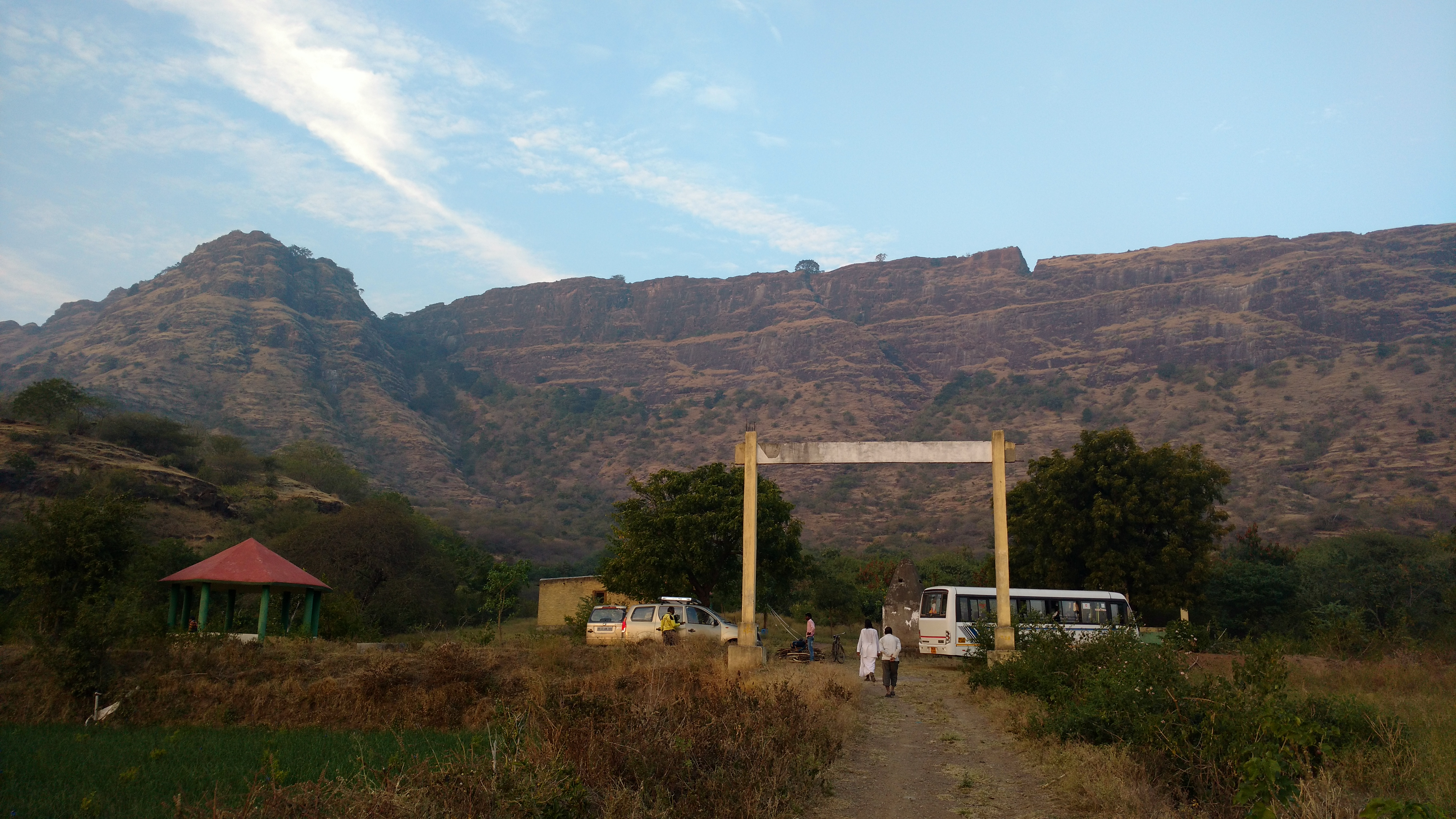
- Pisol Fort from Wadi Pisol

Site information
- Type: Hill fort
- Owner: Government of India
- Open to the public: Yes
- Condition: Ruins

Location
- Shown within Maharashtra
- Coordinates: 20°51′03.3″N 74°13′23.1″E
- Height: 3,700 ft (1,100 m)

Site history
- Materials: Stone

Pisola Fort is a fort located 125 km (78 miles) from Nashik, in the Nashik district of Maharashtra, India. This fort lies exactly on the borders of Dhule & Nashik District. One side is in Sakri Taluka & another is in Satana Taluka. Though this fort is an important fort in Nashik district, it is less visited by trekkers. In Satana taluka, there are four forts in a line on the Galna hill range, the Pisol fort, Dermal fort, Kankrala fort and Galna fort. This fort is easy to climb but requires one hour to reach the fort.

The nearest town is Satana which is 90 km from Nashik. The base village of the fort is Wadi Pisol which is 35 km from Satana.

== Places to see ==
The only structure in good condition is a small mosque on the western edge of the fort. A night stay at the fort can be made in the caves or mosque on the fort. The rock-cut arch-gate of the pleasure palace of Rang Mahal stands in good condition with all its walls fallen to ruins. There are two rock-cut water cisterns on the scarp near the entrance with rock-cut figures of Nandi Bull and Lingas. It takes about one hour to visit all places on the fort.

== See also ==
- List of forts in Maharashtra
- List of forts in India
- Marathi People
- Battles involving the Maratha Empire
- Maratha Army
- Maratha titles
- Military history of India
