= Mulher =

Village in Maharashtra

Mulher Ratnpur (Mahabharat Period) Mayurnagari (King Mayurdhwaj era)
- village
- Location in Maharashtra, India Mulher (India)
- Coordinates: 20°46′53″N 74°03′50″E
- Country: India
- State: Maharashtra
- District: Nashik
- Taluka: Baglan

Languages
  - Official: Marathi
- Time zone: UTC+5:30 (IST)
- PIN: 423302
- Vehicle registration: MH-41
- Nearest city: Malegaon, Mangi-Tungi
- Lok Sabha constituency: Dhule
- Vidhan Sabha constituency: baglan
- Climate: Cool (Köppen)

Mulher is a village in the Nashik district of Maharashtra, India.

== Location ==
The village of Mulher (Mayurnagari) is located on the Southern bank of the Mausam River. It is 3.5 km east by road of the village Vide Digar and the Haranbari Dam (downstream). It is 9 km by road west (upstream) of Taharabad. It is located on State Highway 14.

It is connected by road, and buses and rickshaw are available from Taharabad. There are no hotels at Mulher village; the closest lodgings are Uddhav Samadhi Mandir or Mulher Machi. From Mulher machi the trio of forts Mora, Hargad and Mulher can easily be climbed in a day.

Mulher Fort is located in Mulher village. From the township to the base of the Fort is approximately 5 kilometres.

== History ==
The Rashtrauda dynasty of Bagul clan reigned Baglan between 1310 and 1638. Mulher fort was their capital. The Mughals then gained control of Baglan. For the Surat ransack of January 1664 & October 1670, Shivaji had followed the route passing through Baglan to reach Surat. On the first occasion, the entire region from Pune to Surat was under the command of the Mughals while on the second occasion, Baglan was mainly under their control. The Mughals chased Shivaji Raje on his return journey but they were defeated in the Kanchana Pass. Soon after this, Shivaji began a campaign in this region. In January 1671 the first assault brought the Salher fort under the Maratha rule. They then attacked Mulher fort but the Mughal Killedar repulsed the attack. However, the Marathas captured the Chaulher fort. In October 1671, the Mughals laid siege to Salher fort. But Shivaji despatched Moropant and Prataprao to break down the siege. They not only lifted the siege of Salher, but also attacked Mulher and captured it in February 1672. This feat resulted in the assimilation of the entire Baglan region into Swarajya. After the last Anglo-Maratha war of 1818, there are some mentions that there are four big cannons on this fort. His names were Fattelashkar, Ramprasad, Shivprasad and Markandey. It is learned that the last cannon was melted down by the British. Two of the three cannons, Ram Prasad and Shiv Prasad, were found in a search operation in the forest in 2021-22. On March 6, 2022, with the permission of Nashik Department of Archeology, the cannon reached Someshwar Mahadev Mandir on Mulher fort in 12 hours through fort restorers of Sahyadri Pratishthan.

== Gallery ==
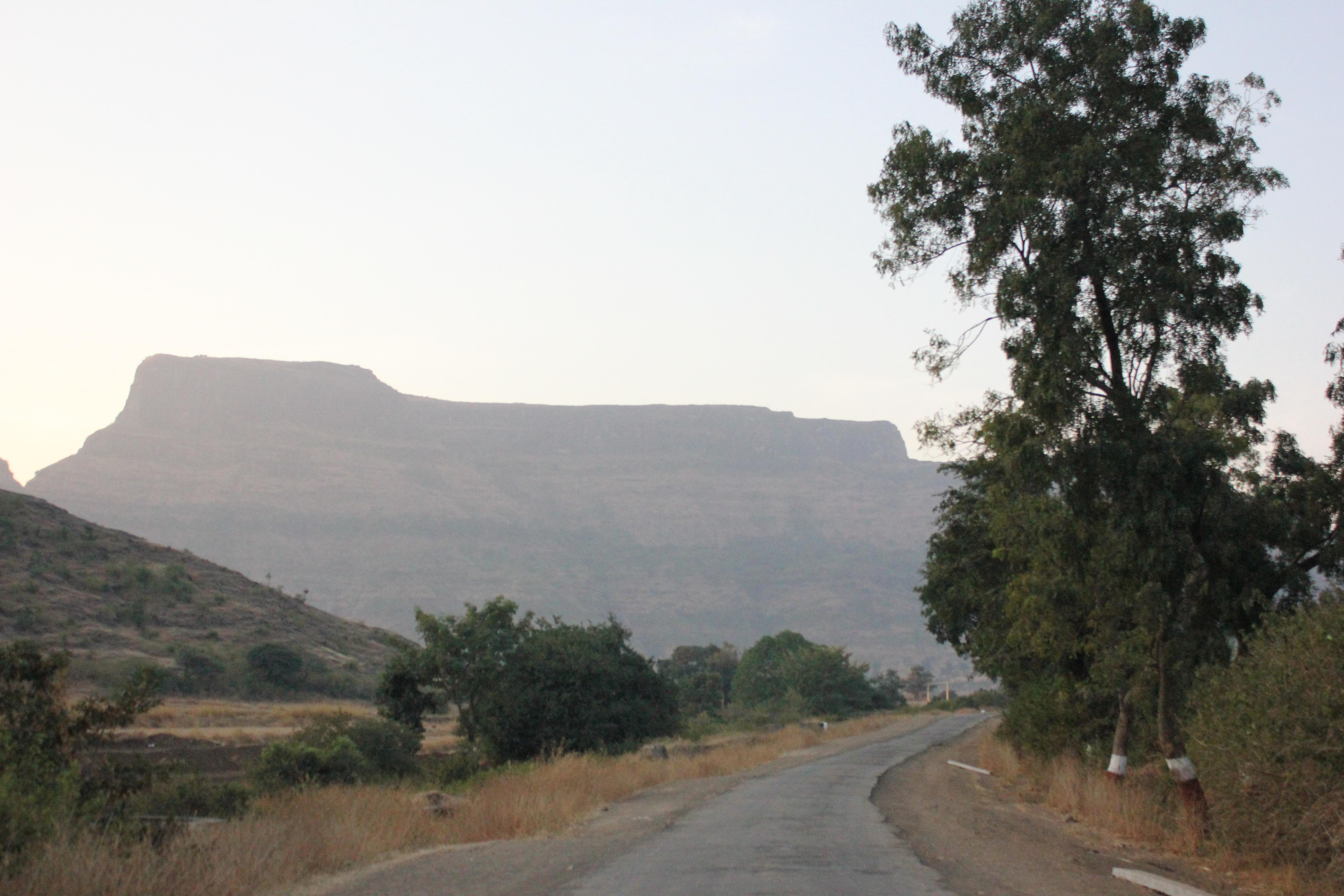
Mulher

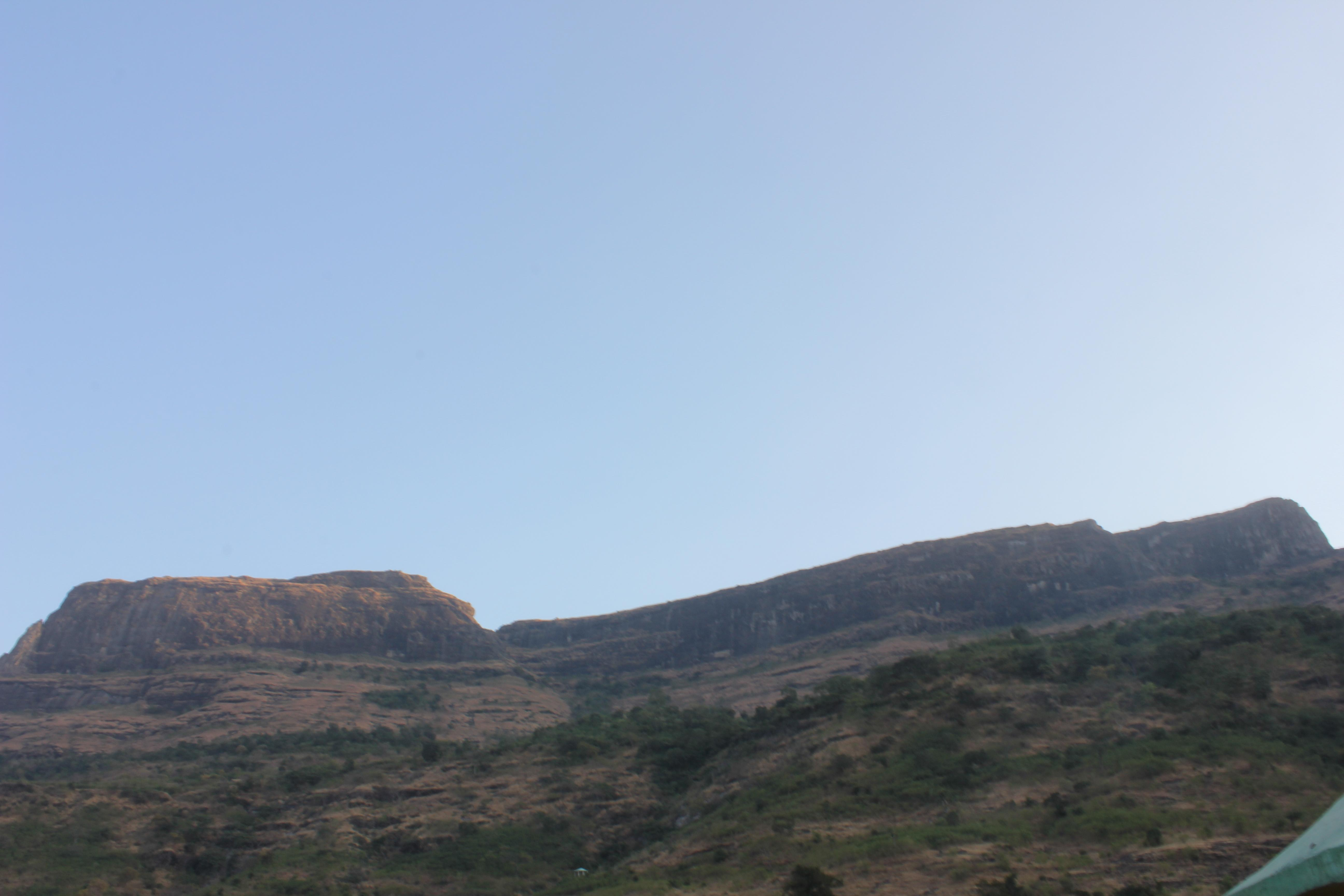
Mulher

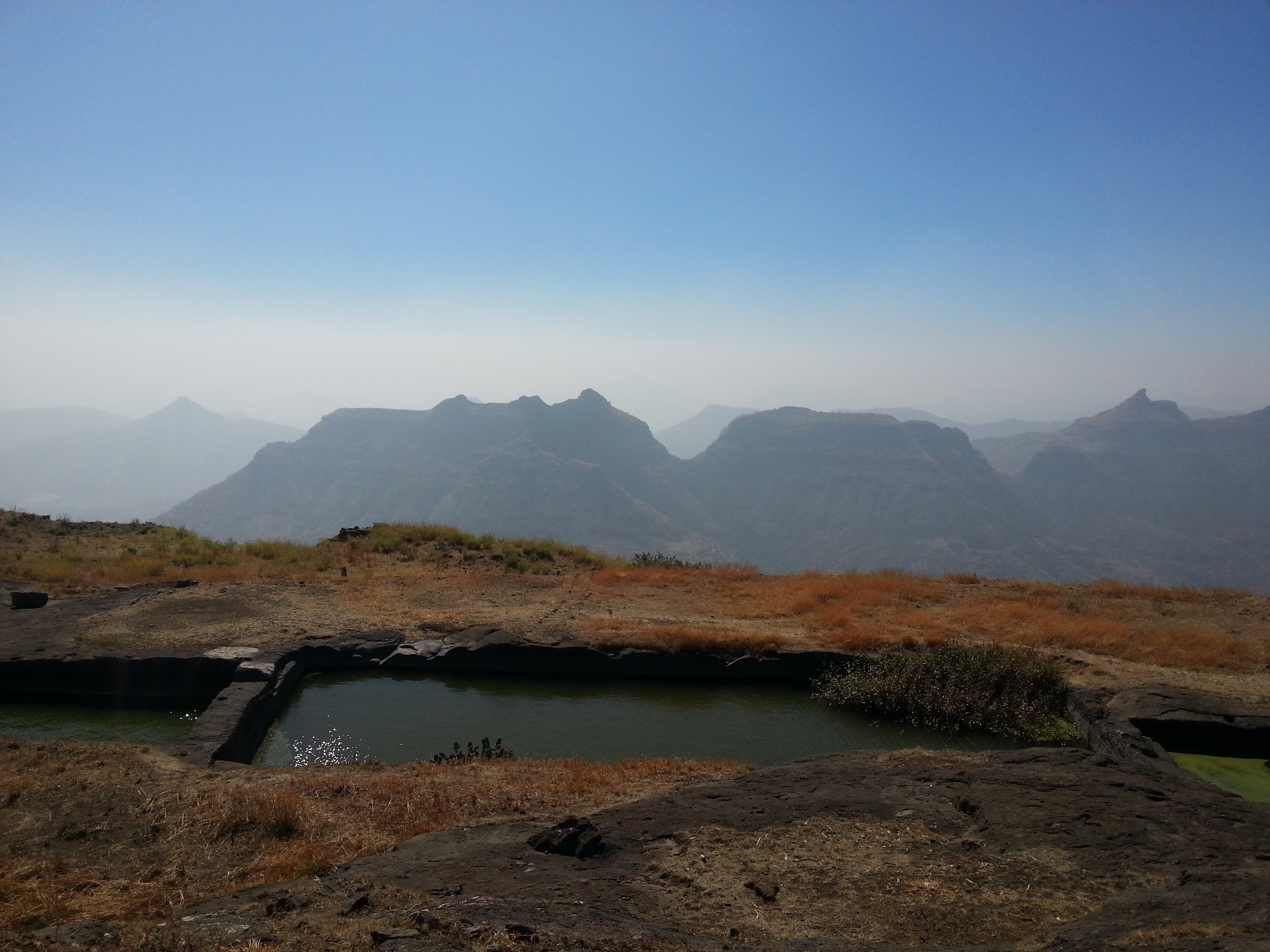
Rock cut cisterns on the fort with potable water

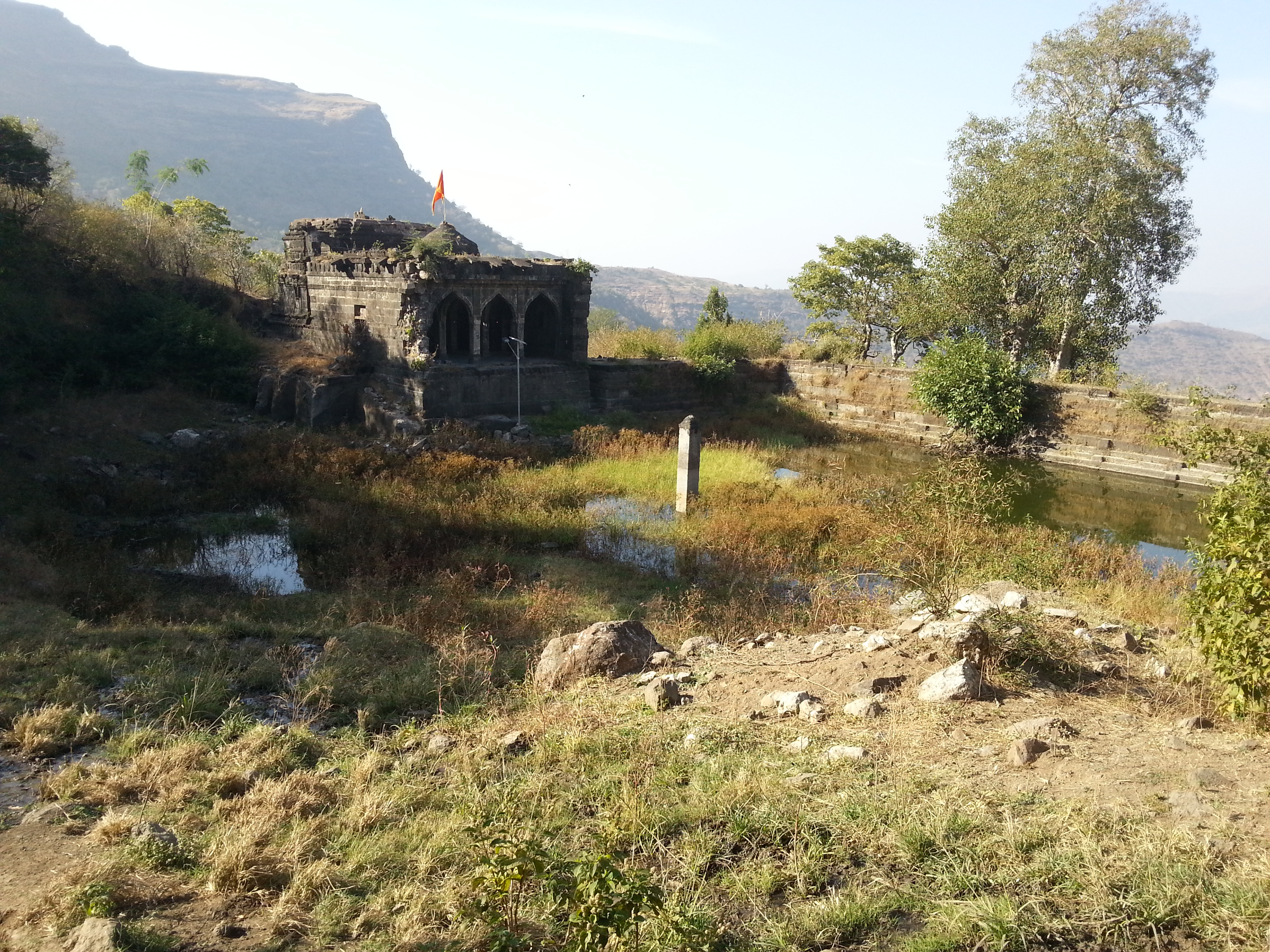
Ganesh mandir on Mulher Machi

== See also ==
- List of forts in Maharashtra
- List of forts in India
- List of Maratha dynasties and states
- Battles involving the Maratha Empire
