= Haranbari Dam =

- Location within Maharashtra
- Official name: Haranbari Dam D02911
- Location: Baglan Taluka, Nashik District
- Coordinates: 20.797181°N 74.0291404°E
- Opening date: 1980
- Owners: Government of Maharashtra, India

Dam and spillways
- Type of dam: Earthfill
- Impounds: Mosam River
- Height: 34 m (112 ft)
- Length: 1,419 m (4,656 ft)
- Dam volume: 2,375 km^{3} (570 cu mi)

Reservoir
- Total capacity: 33,020 km^{3} (7,920 cu mi)
- Surface area: 5,540 km^{2} (2,140 sq mi)

Haranbari Dam, is an earthfill dam on the Mosam River near Satana, Nashik District in the state of Maharashtra in India.

== Specifications ==
The height of the dam above its lowest foundation is 34 m (112 ft) while the length is 1,419 m (4,656 ft). The volume content is 2,375 km^{3} (570 cu mi) and gross storage capacity is 34,780.00 km^{3} (8,344.17 cu mi).

== Purpose ==
- Irrigation

== See also ==
- Dams in Maharashtra
- List of reservoirs and dams in India
