= Nhavigad =

Fort in Maharashtra, India

Nhavigad Fort
- Nashik district, Maharashtra
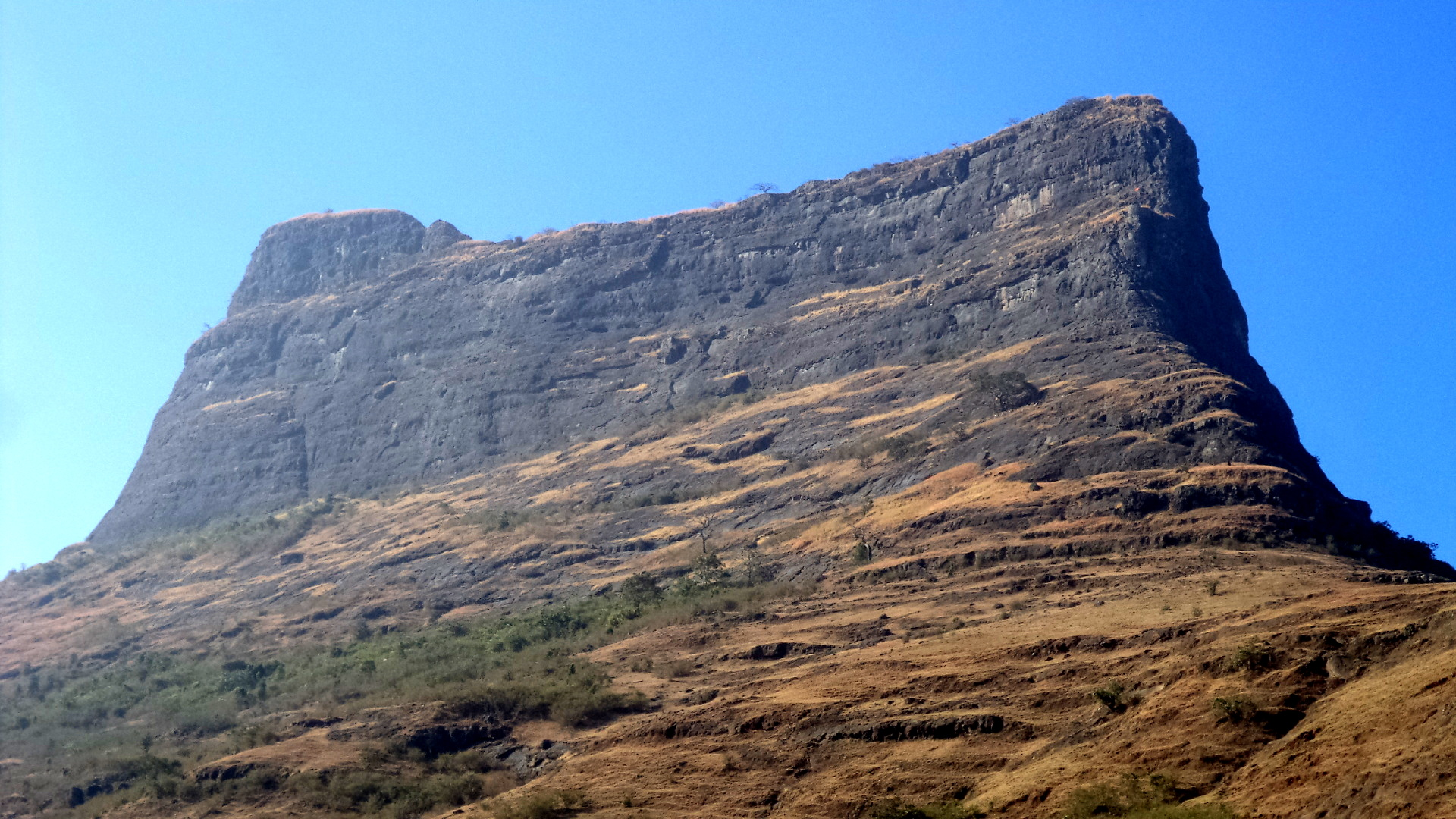
- Nhavigad fort from Patalwadi village

Site information
- Type: Hill fort
- Owner: Government of India
- Open to the public: Yes
- Condition: Ruins

Location
- Shown within Maharashtra
- Location within Maharashtra
- Coordinates: 20°49′59.2″N 74°02′41.5″E
- Height: 4100 feet

Site history
- Built: 1400
- Materials: Stone
- Location: Maharashtra, India
- Trailheads: Patalwadi to Nhavigad
- Use: Hiking
- Highest point: Nhavigad top
- Lowest point: Patalwadi
- Grade: Tough
- Difficulty: Three star trek
- Season: October to May
- Sights: Mangi-Tungi, Salher, Salota, Hargad, Mulher, Mora forts

Nhavigad is also called as Nhavagad or Ratangad. It is located in the Baglan area of Nashik district. There are two main hill ranges in Baglan area the Selbari range and Dholbari range. These two ranges run parallel to each other in east-west direction. Nhavigad is located in Selbari mountain range. All these forts were maintained to keep watch on the Burhanpur-Surat ancient commercial road. The road passes between the two hill ranges. Nhavigad is a small fort, but very difficult to climb.

== History ==
In the records it is written that there was a fierce battle in 1439 between Bahamani king and the King of Gujarat at the base of the Nhavigad and adjoining Tambolya hill. Both sides received huge losses, hence both sides receded from the battleground at night.

== Places to see ==
There are few rock cut cisterns and caves on the fort, else there is nothing to see. There is no fortification or significant construction on the fort. On the half way there is a small temple of Saptashringi devi. From the fort Mangi-Tungi, Salher, Salota, Hargad, Mulher, Mora forts are easily seen.

== How to reach ==
There is a good motorable road up to the base village Patalwadi. It takes about one an hour to reach Patalwadi from the nearest town Taharabad. It is strictly advisable to get a local escort from village Patalwadi. The trek is a steady climb. The entire hill is devoid of trees or rocks. The pathway is very risky and becomes slippery in the monsoon. The rock cut steps are near the final climb of the fort. There is no good water on the fort, so it is advisable to carry enough water. It takes about one hour to climb the fort.

== Gallery ==
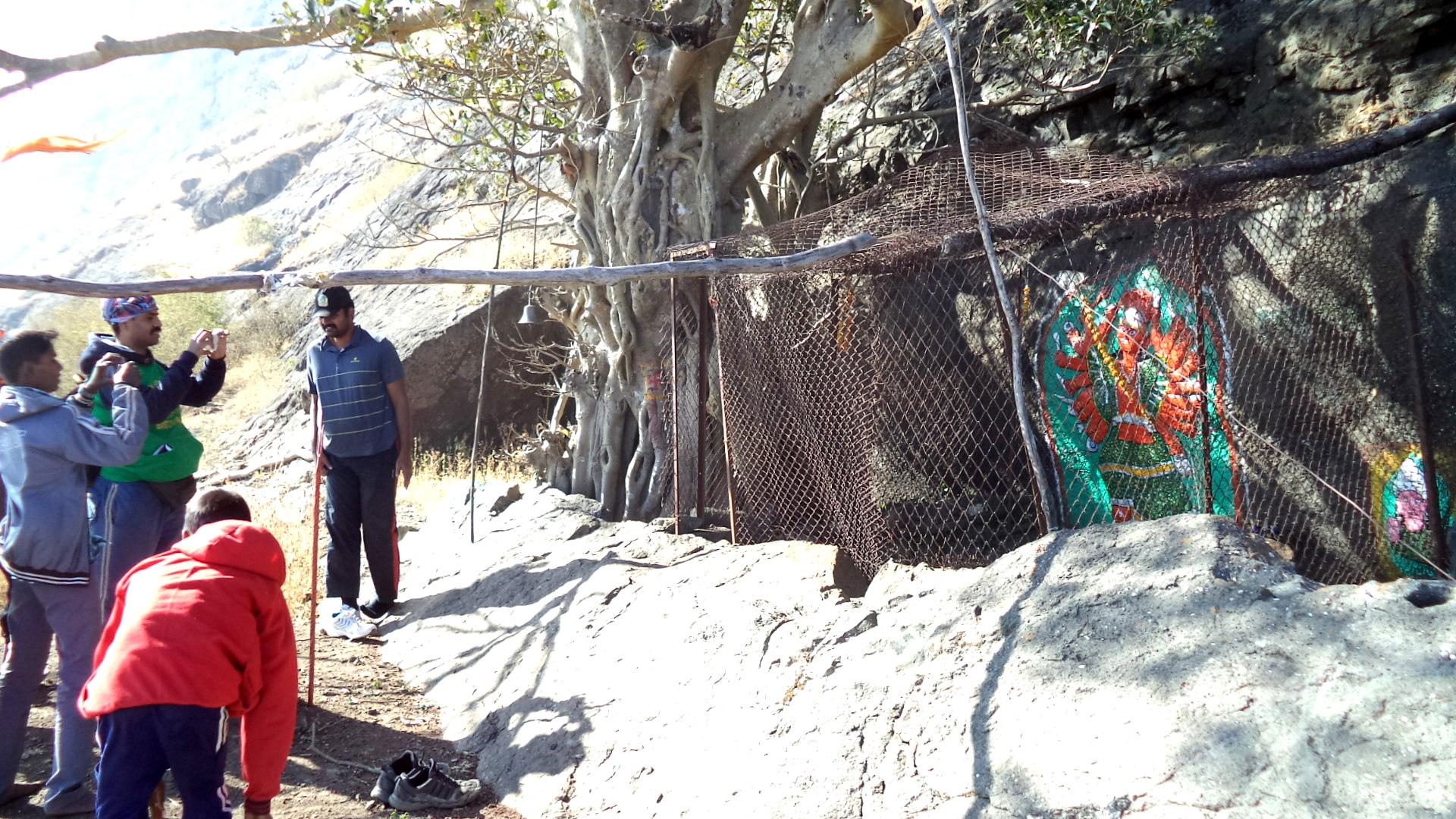
temple of Saptashringi on the half way

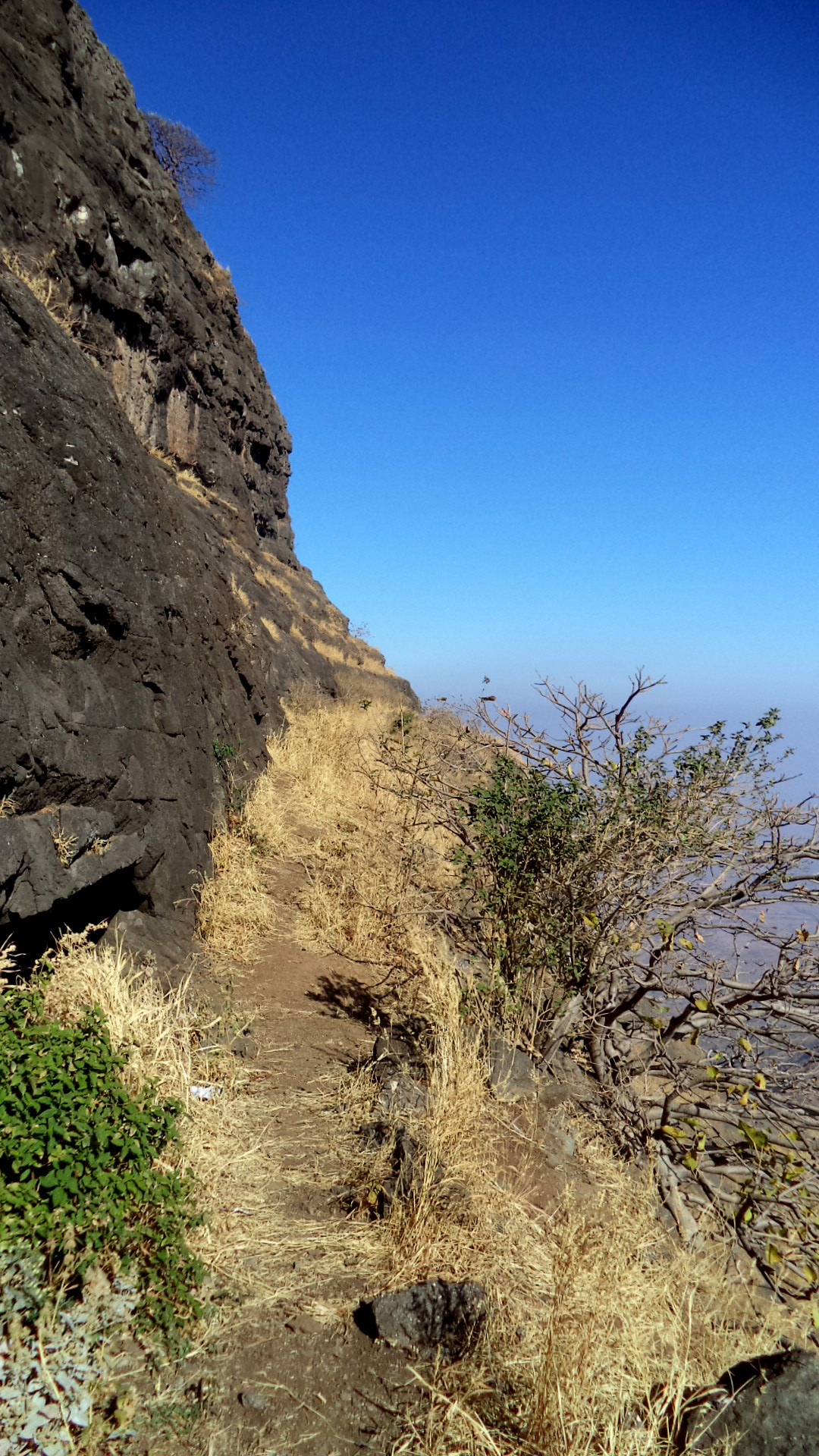
Pathway on the fort

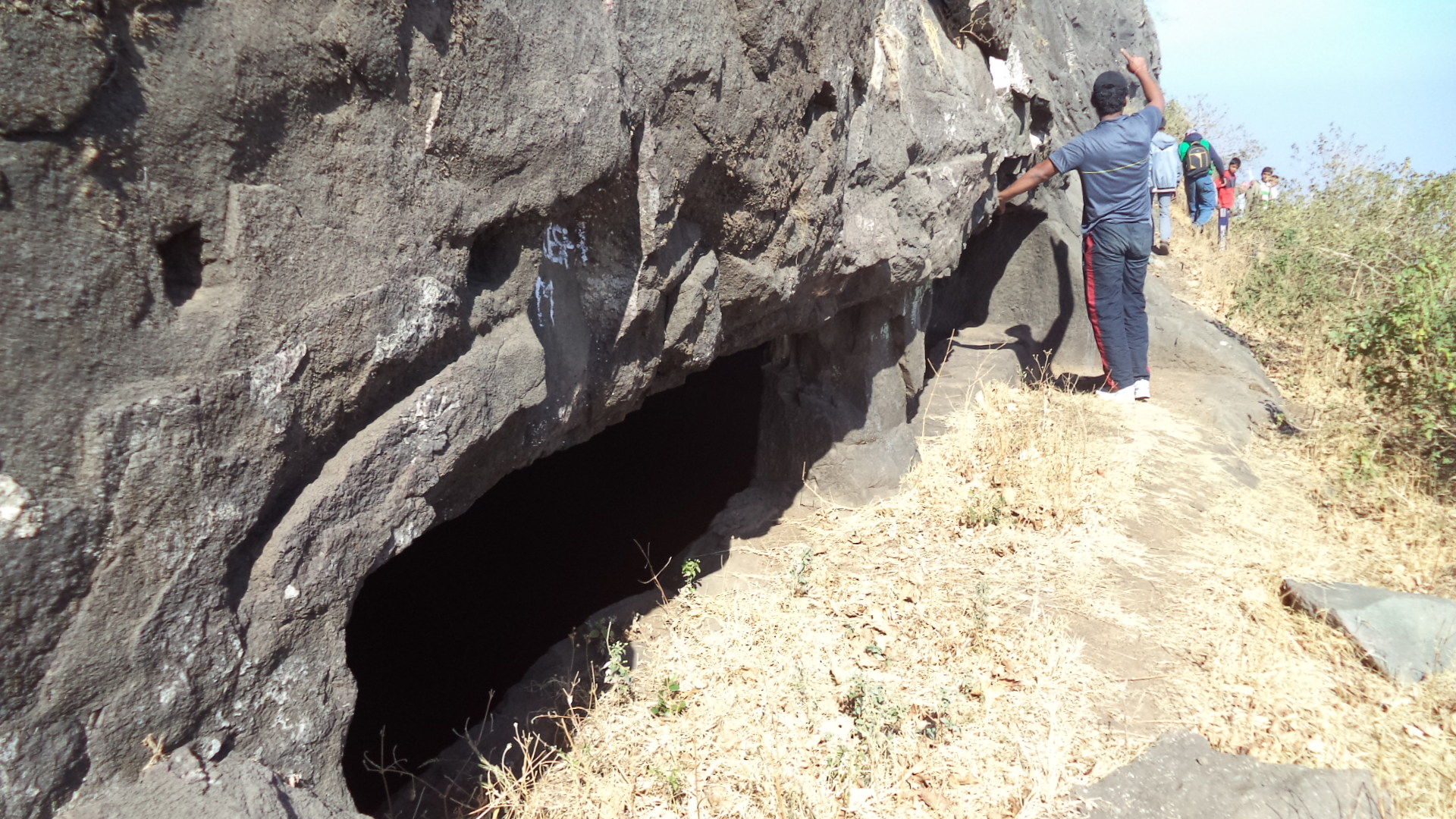
Rock cut water cistern on the fort
