= Baglan taluka =

Baglan taluka Satana
- Taluka/Tehsil
- Location in Maharashtra, India
- Coordinates: 20.58°N 74.22°E
- Country: India
- State: Maharashtra
- District: Nashik

Area
  - Total: 1,477.83 km^{2} (570.59 sq mi)

Population (2004)
  - Total: 311,000
  - Density: 210/km^{2} (545/sq mi)

Languages
  - Official: Ahirani
- Time zone: UTC+5:30 (IST)
- Nearest city: Satana

Baglan is a taluka (tehsil) in Nashik District in the Indian state of Maharashtra. Sometimes Baglan Taluka is unofficially referred to as Satana, because of that city's dominance within the taluka.

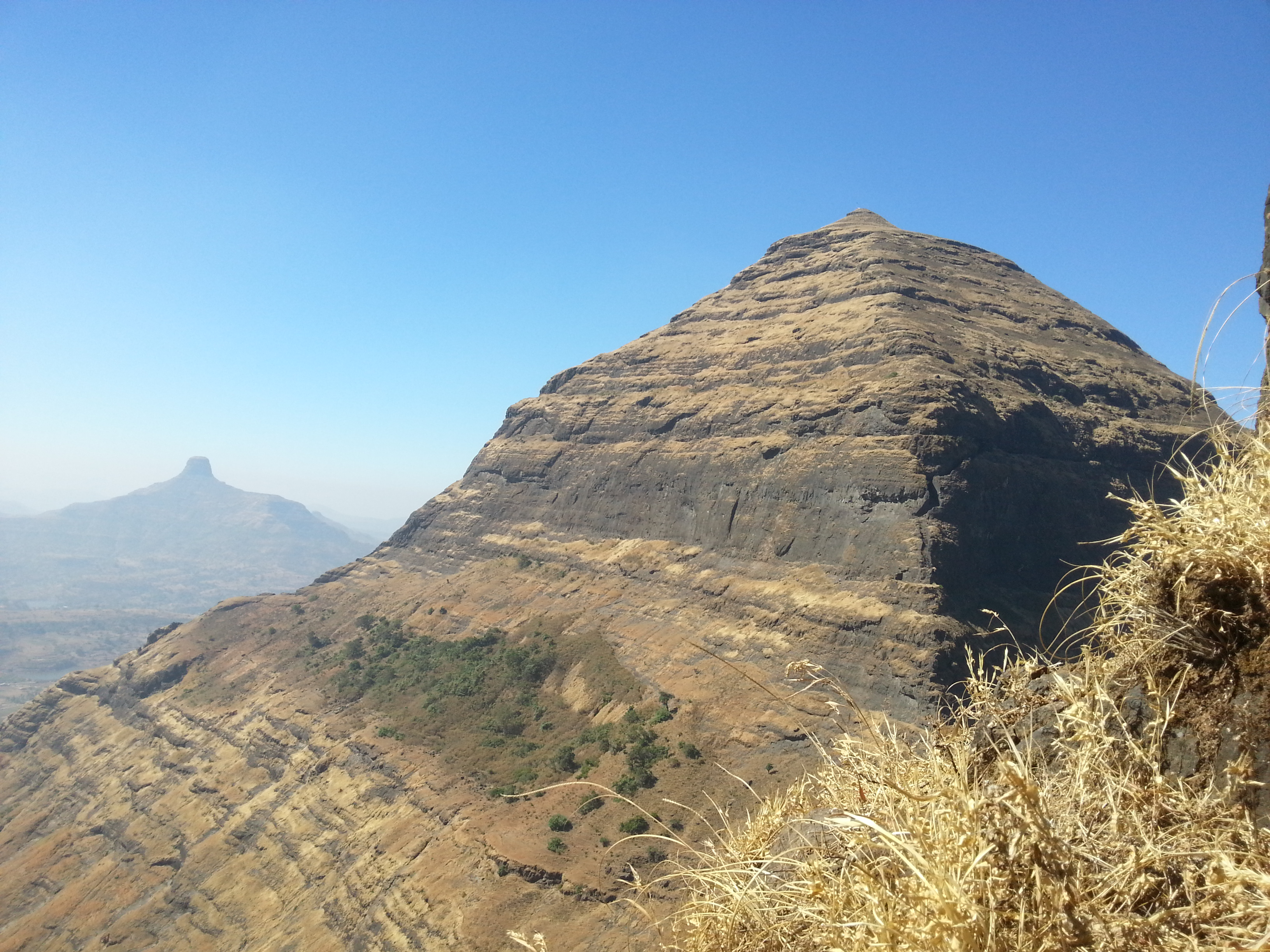
Salher fort

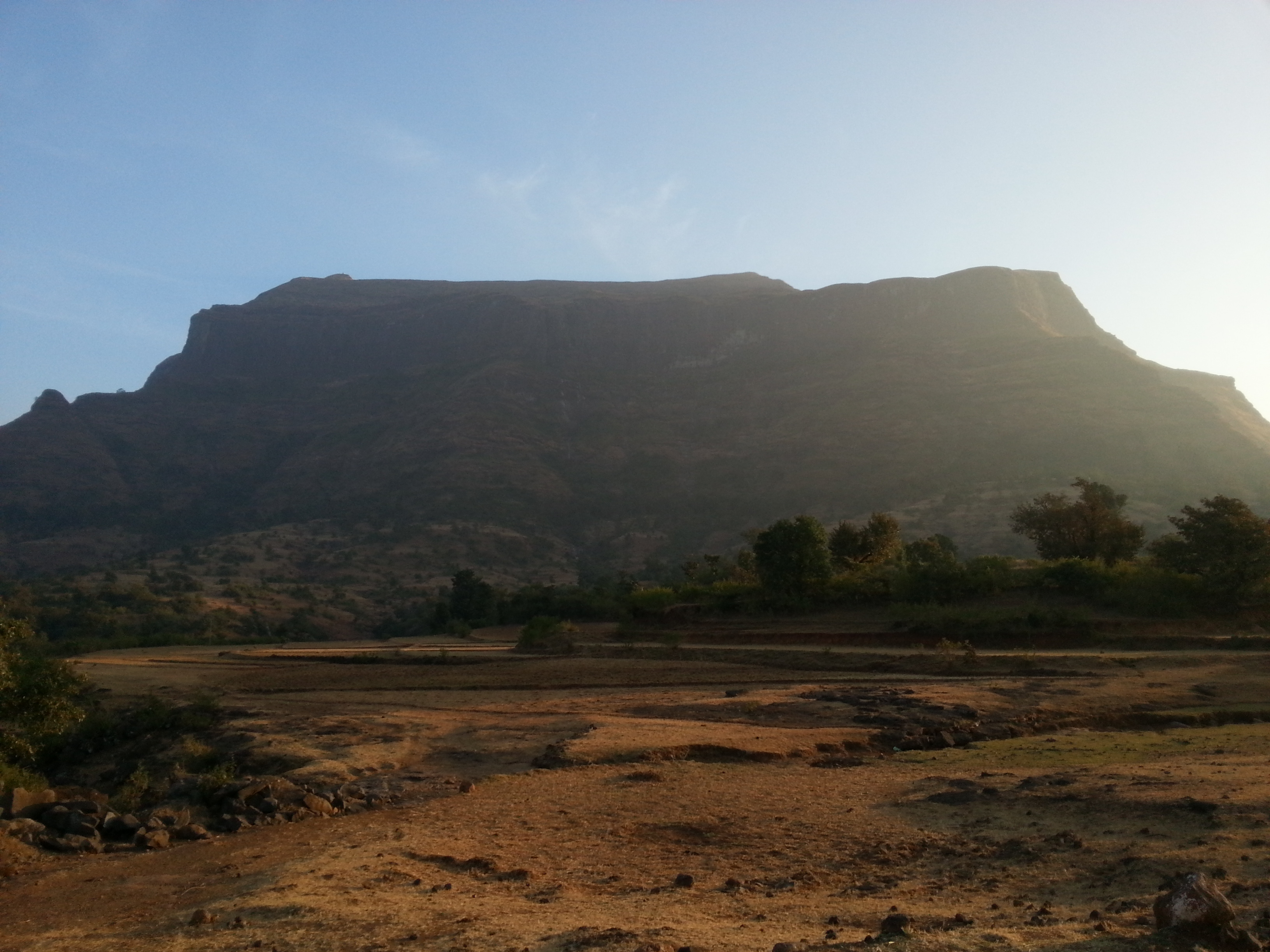
Mulher fort

== Geography ==
Baglan Taluka is located in the mountains of the Western Ghats. Its principal river is the Mausam River (Mosam River) which is dammed at Haranbari Dam creating a large reservoir.

== History ==
While now a backwater, Baglan was once the site of the Baglan Kingdom, the Bagul kingdom that existed from 1308 to 1619. The native people in the area were the Bhils and the Dhangars, Marathas.

Later on during the rule of Chatrapati Shivaji Raje Bhosale of the Maratha Empire, Baglan was a territory of major importance because of its proximity to the then flourishing and rich mughal market city of Surat. Maratha's were aware of this and used it to their advantage by capturing the area from Mughals and later on mounting a loot on Surat thrice. There are two main hill ranges in Baglan area the Selbari range is south of the Dolbari hill range. These two ranges run parallel to each other in east–west direction. Nhavigad, Tambolya hill and mangi-Tungi are located on Dolbari hill range. The Salher, Salota, Hargad, Mulher and Mora forts are located on Selbari range. All these forts were maintained to keep watch on the Burhanpur-Surat ancient commercial road. The road passes between the two hill ranges. The forts of Salher and Mulher in Baglan Tehsil were used as halting and storage points during Marathas march back to home after looting Surat. Beside this forts, Marathas were staying and used to store thing on small fort of Pisol ghat, near Nandin village, which is at end of Nashik district. The battle of Salher which is a milestone in the history of Maratha was fought here. the forts in this region are among the highest forts in Maharashtra. The forts are tough and demand high endurance from the trekkers.

== Tourism ==
=== Temples ===
Seven old temples are located on Mangi, and five on Tungi. There is a large temple with a high spire in the valley. There are numerous caves in the hills named after great saints such as Mahavir, Adinath, Shantinath, Parshwanath and Ratnatrya. Inside the caves there are over 300 statues to these various saints, with two large idols of Mahavir. The area is considered sacred by both Hindus and Jains and enshrines images of Jain Tirthankaras in several postures including padmasana and kayotsarga. Sometimes, it is described as Siddha Kshetra, meaning a gateway to the state of enlightenment. A grand fair is held there annually during Kartik (September–October) where Hindus and Jains visit in large numbers to witness the grand rath yatra. The area around Mangi-Tungi is also used for hiking.
