= Kankrala =

Hill Fort in India

Kankrala Fort
- Nashik district, Maharashtra
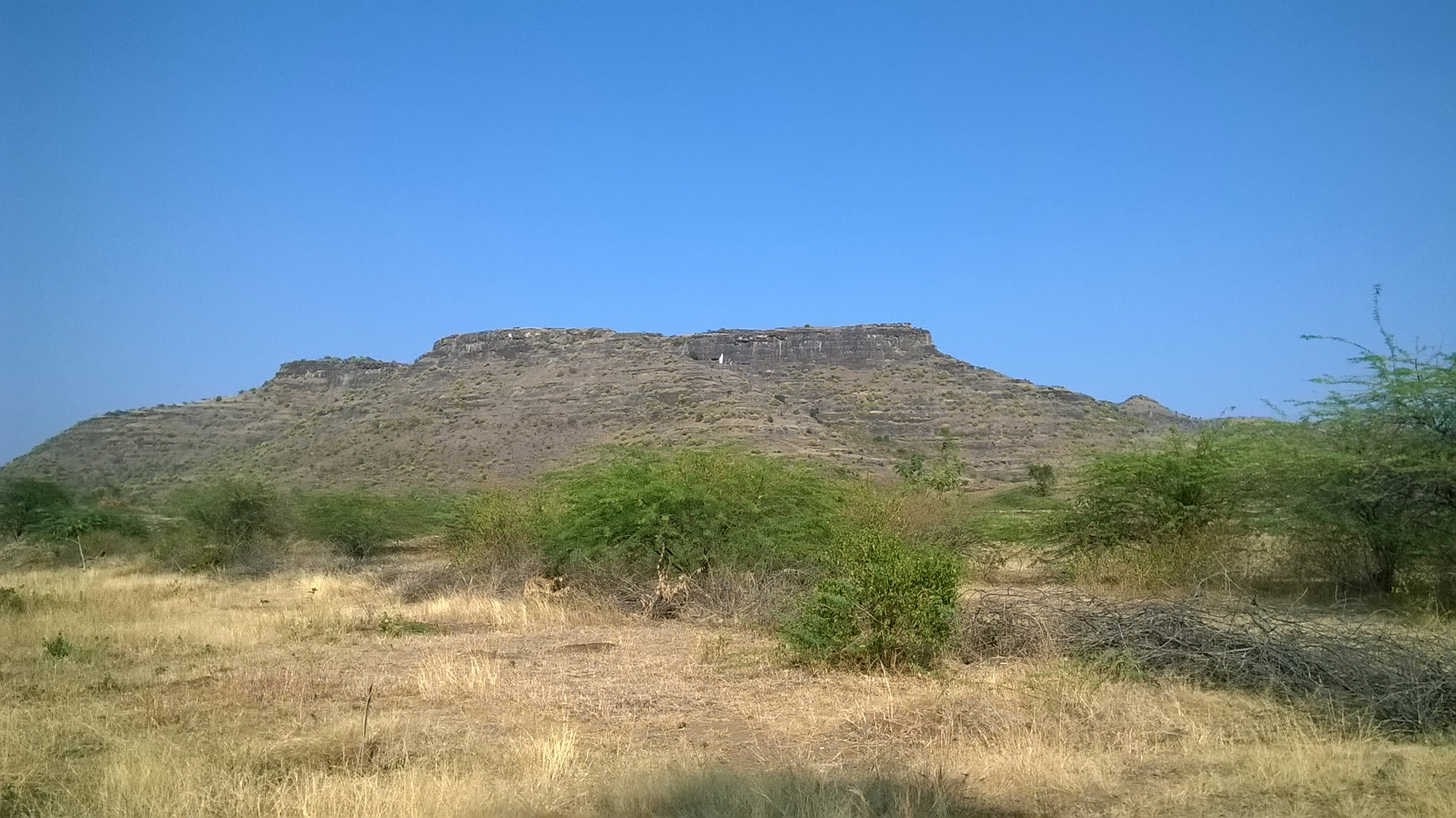
- Kankrala fort

Site information
- Type: hill fort
- Owner: Government of India
- Open to the public: Yes
- Condition: Ruins

Location
- Shown within Maharashtra
- Coordinates: 20°42′24″N 74°29′11.8″E
- Height: 2476 feet

Site history
- Materials: Stone
- Difficulty: Medium

Kankrala (Marathi: कंक्राळा) is an ancient hill fort that occupies two hills in the Malegaon taluka of Nashik district.

== History ==
This fort is situated south of Galna fort. Very little history is known about this fort. It was captured by the British under Colonel Wallace in 1818.

== Places to see ==
There are many rock cut water cisterns on the top of the fort as well as in the rocks near the gate. The water near the gate is potable. There are few caves near the entrance. The entrance is in dilapidated condition. There are no structures on the fort except few ruins.

== How to reach ==
The village Karanjgavhan is situated near the village Kankrala. There is a direct road from Malegaon via Vadgaon and Lendhane villages to Karanjgavhan ( distance 11 km). The other route is through the road from Zodage which is on National Highway 3. Zodage to Karanjgavhan distance is about 15 km. From Karanjgavhan the road to the village Kankrala is about 5 km. The cart road take a western detour from village Kankrala which leads to the temple near the fort. From the temple the fort is clearly visible. It takes about an hour to reach the fort top. There are no proper steps or path ways.

== Gallery ==
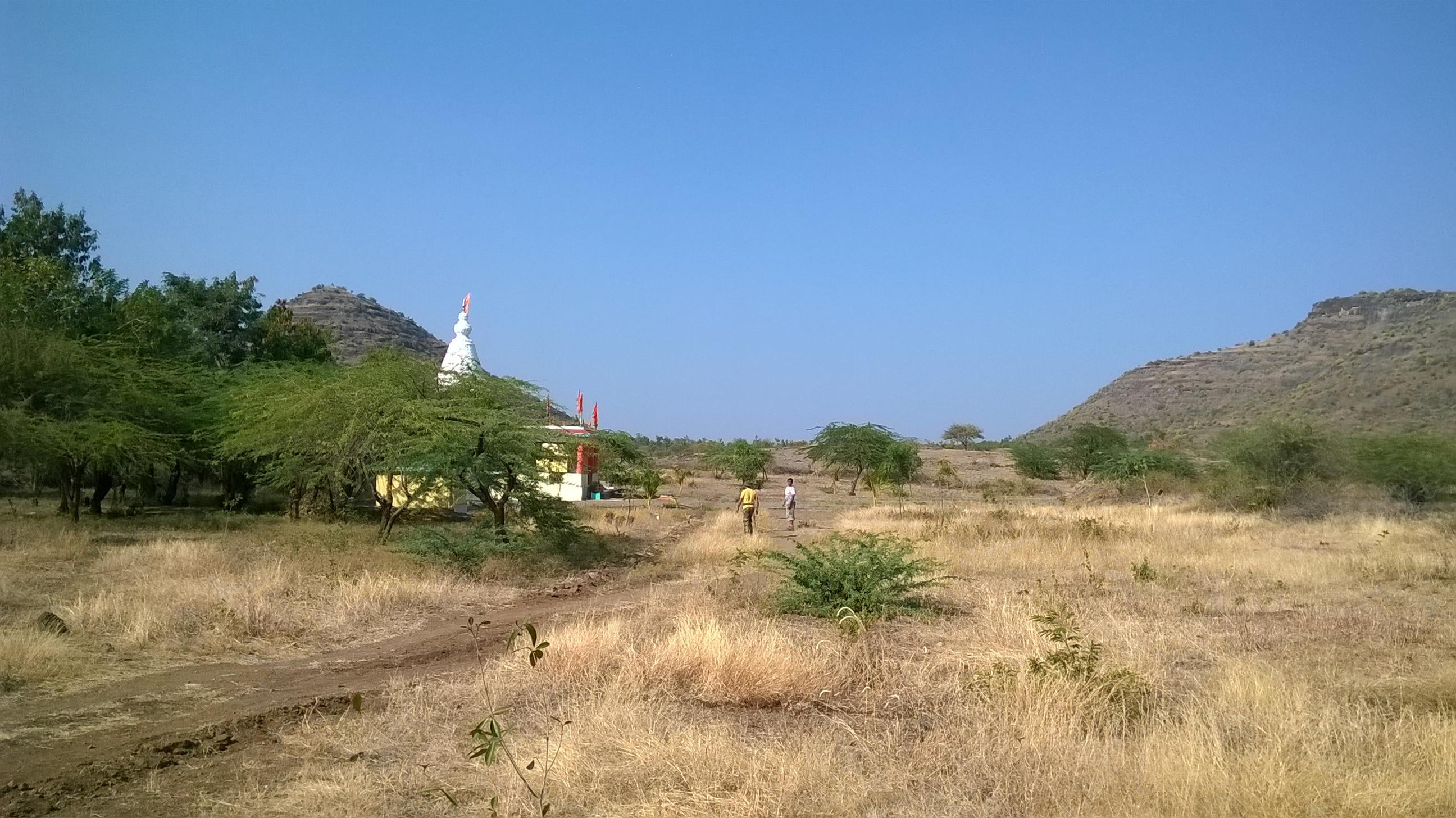
Temple and the fort at right

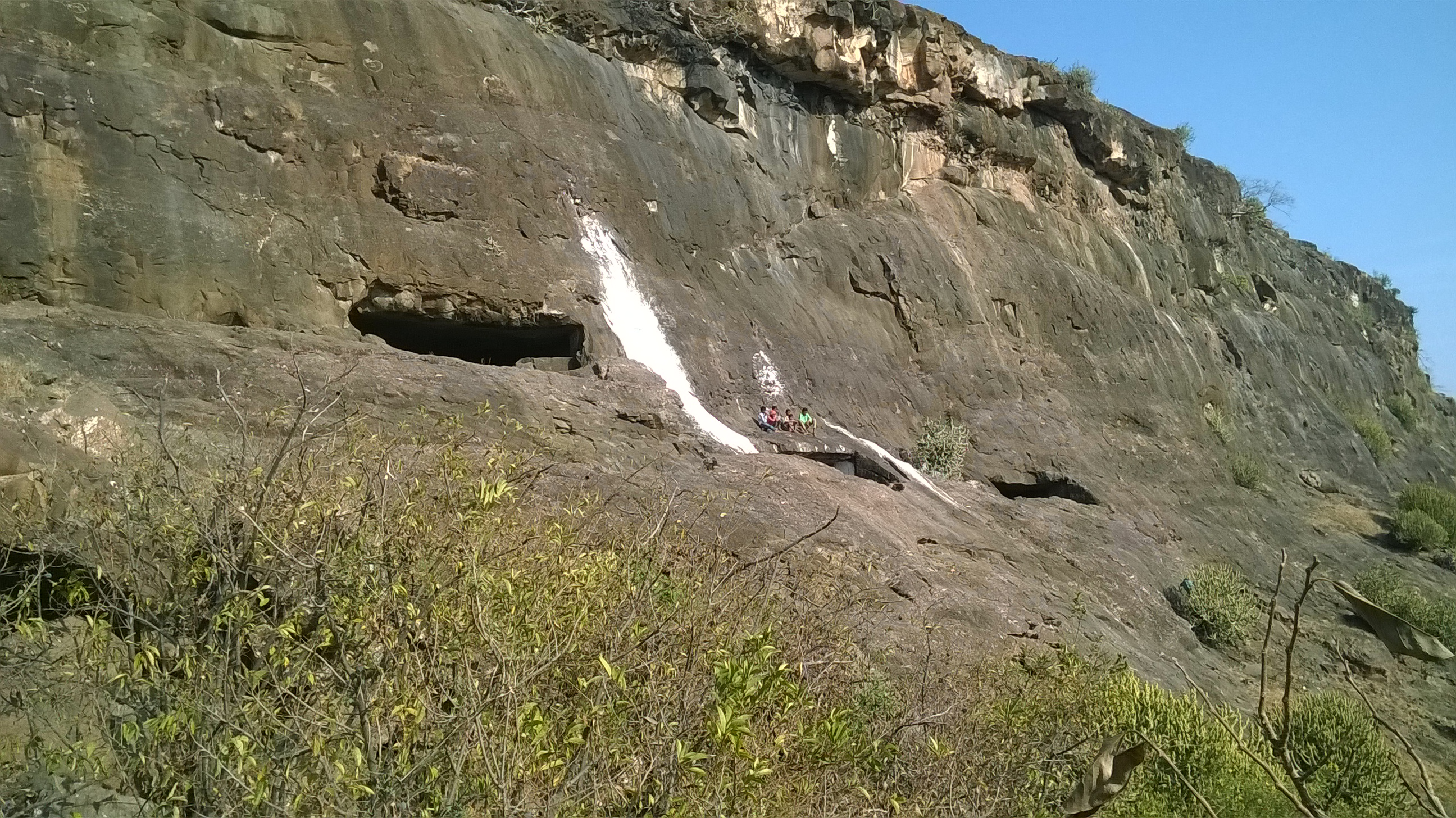
Caves

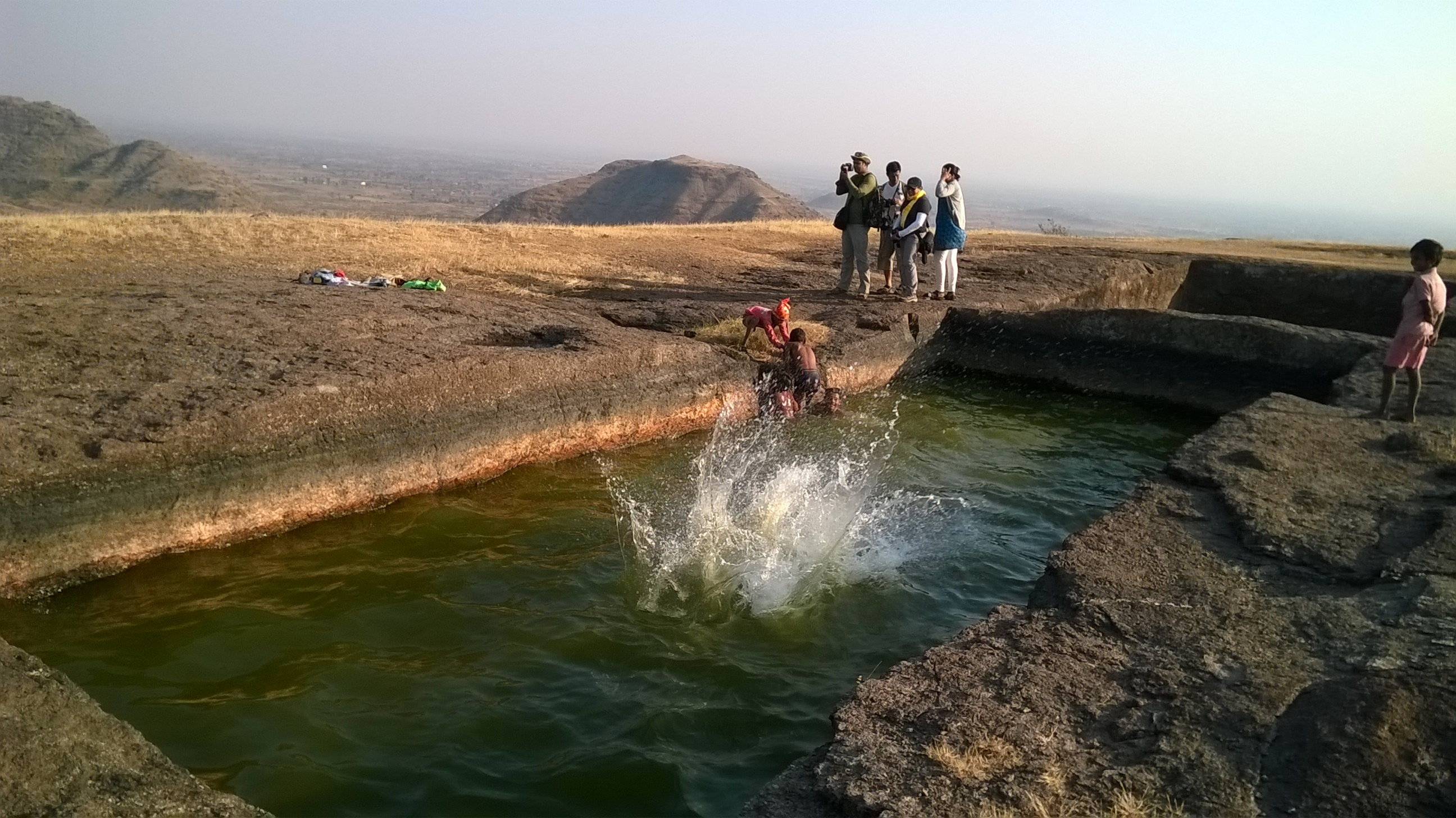
Water tanks
