= Bagul =

South Asian social group

Bagul is a Maharatta clan and a surname.

== Origin ==
The Bagul clan descends from the Rashtrakutas of the Baglana kingdom.

== Surname ==
- Sahebrao Sukram Bagul (born 1953), Indian politician

== See also ==
- Maratha clan system
