= Galna Fort =

Fort in Maharashtra

- Galna, Nashik
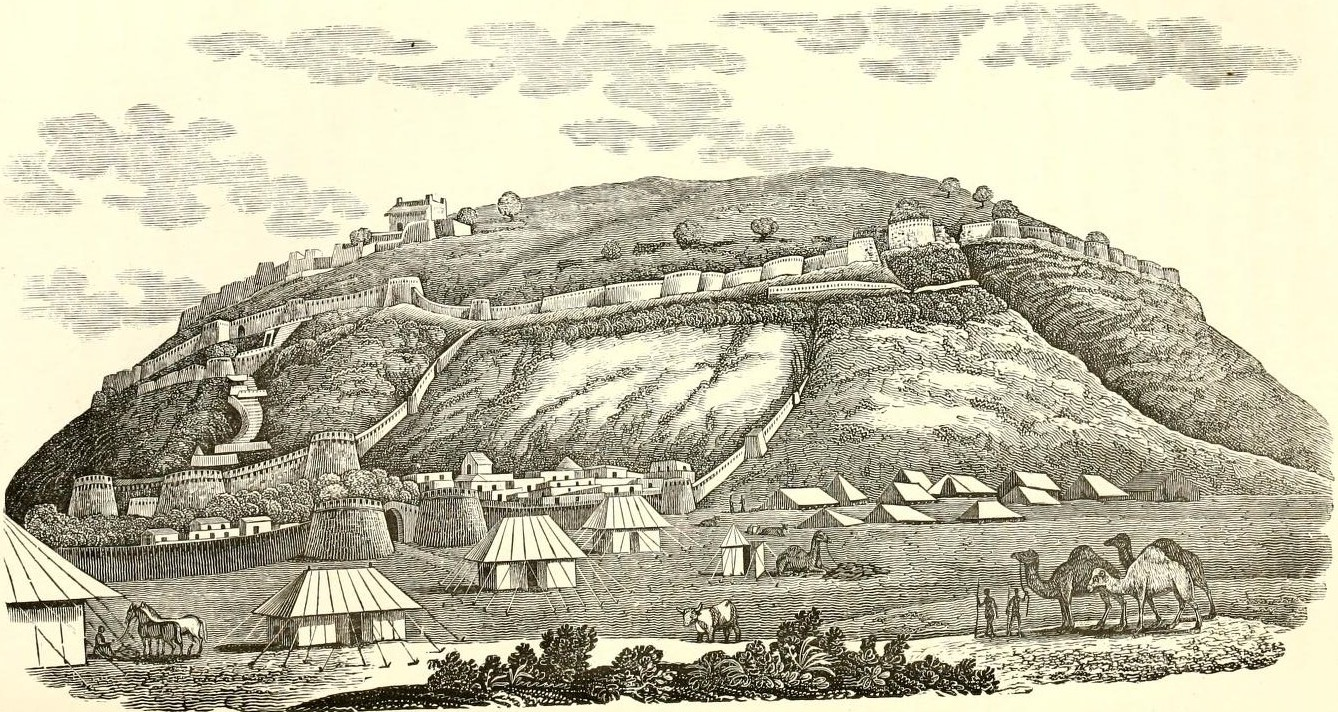
- The hill fort of Galna, 1804

Site information
- Owner: Government of India
- Open to the public: Yes
- Condition: Fairly good

Location
- Shown within Maharashtra
- Location within Maharashtra
- Coordinates: 20.7733387°N 74.5333314°E
- Height: 2000 m

Site history
- Materials: Stone, lime and lead

Garrison information
- Occupants: Malik Wuji and Malik Ashraf, Ahmed Shah Shivaji, Holkars, British

Galna was a major fort in Malegaon talukain in the south Khandesh area of Maharashtra, India. This fort was an important fort on the Burhanpur-Surat trade route. This is one of the forts in Maharashtra with the bastion and the entrance in good condition. This fort is located on hills between Malegaon and Dhule.

== How to reach ==
This fort is located in Malegaon taluka of Nashik district. The base village Galna is well connected by motorable road to Malegaon and Dhule. Regular buses ply from Malegaon to Dongarale village. Dongarale village is 30–15 km from Malegaon as well as Dhule. Dongarale to Galna distance is 4 km.

== History ==
Galna was an important place at the end of the fifteenth century. It lay on the border of the Deccan. It was held by the Maratha when about in 1487, two brothers Malik Wuji and Malik Ashraf, the Governors of Daulatabad took it and held for some time. In 1506 after the murder of Malik Wauji the fort was under the control of Malik Ahmed Shah Nizam of Ahmadnagar. On the death of Malik Ahmed Shah Nizam of Ahmadnagar on 1510 again the fort was passed to Musalman chief who denied to pay tributes to Maratha chief. In 1634 Muhammad khan, the Musalman commandant of Galna delivered their tributes to Moghuls. It was attacked by Aurangzeb in 1704 and captured in 1705. In October–November 1804 this fort was taken from Holkars by a force under Colonel Wallace. Finally, in March 1818 it was occupied by native infantry. For a few year after 1818, a mamlatdar held an office in Galna.

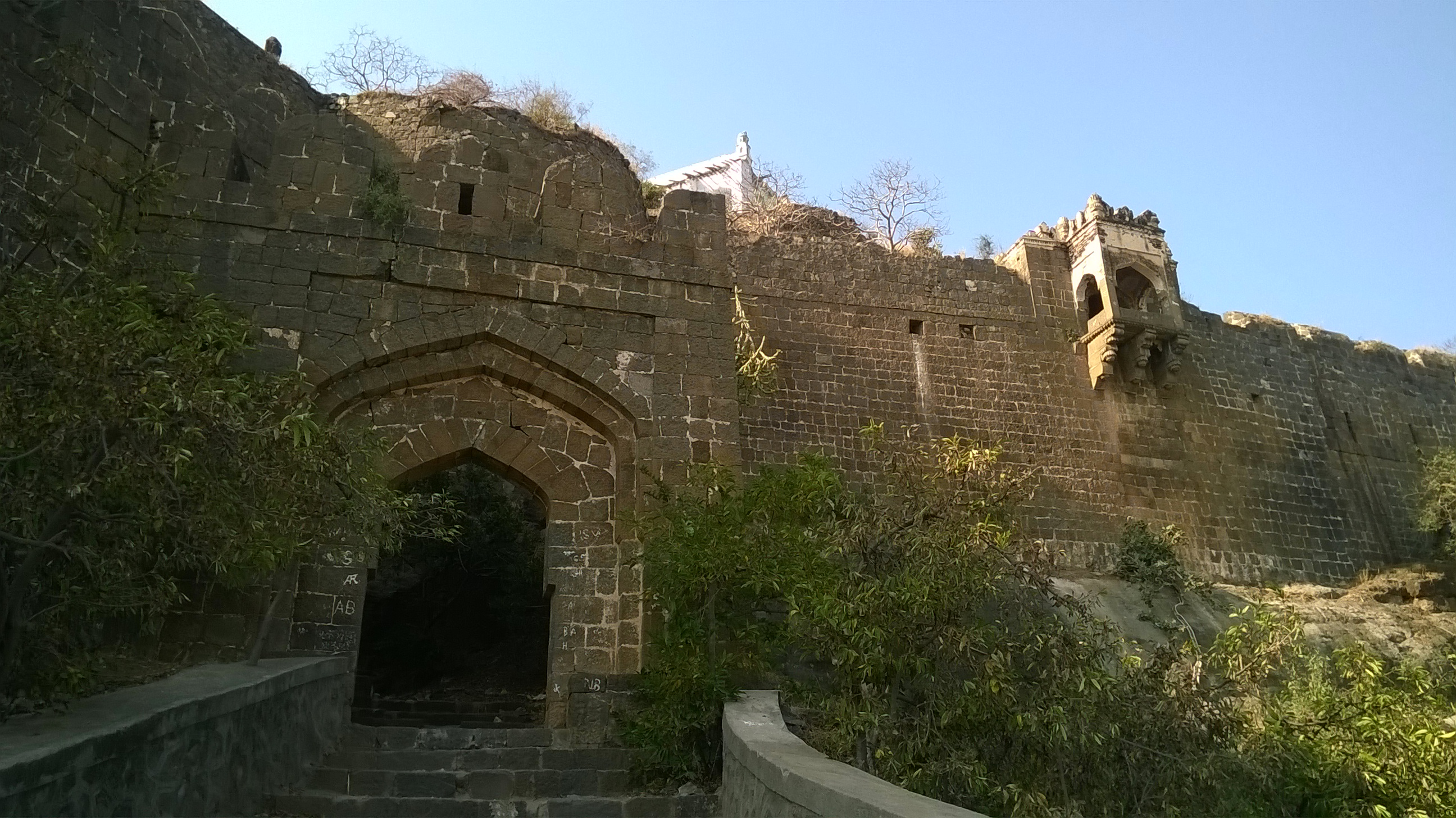
Galna fort as seen from the village side

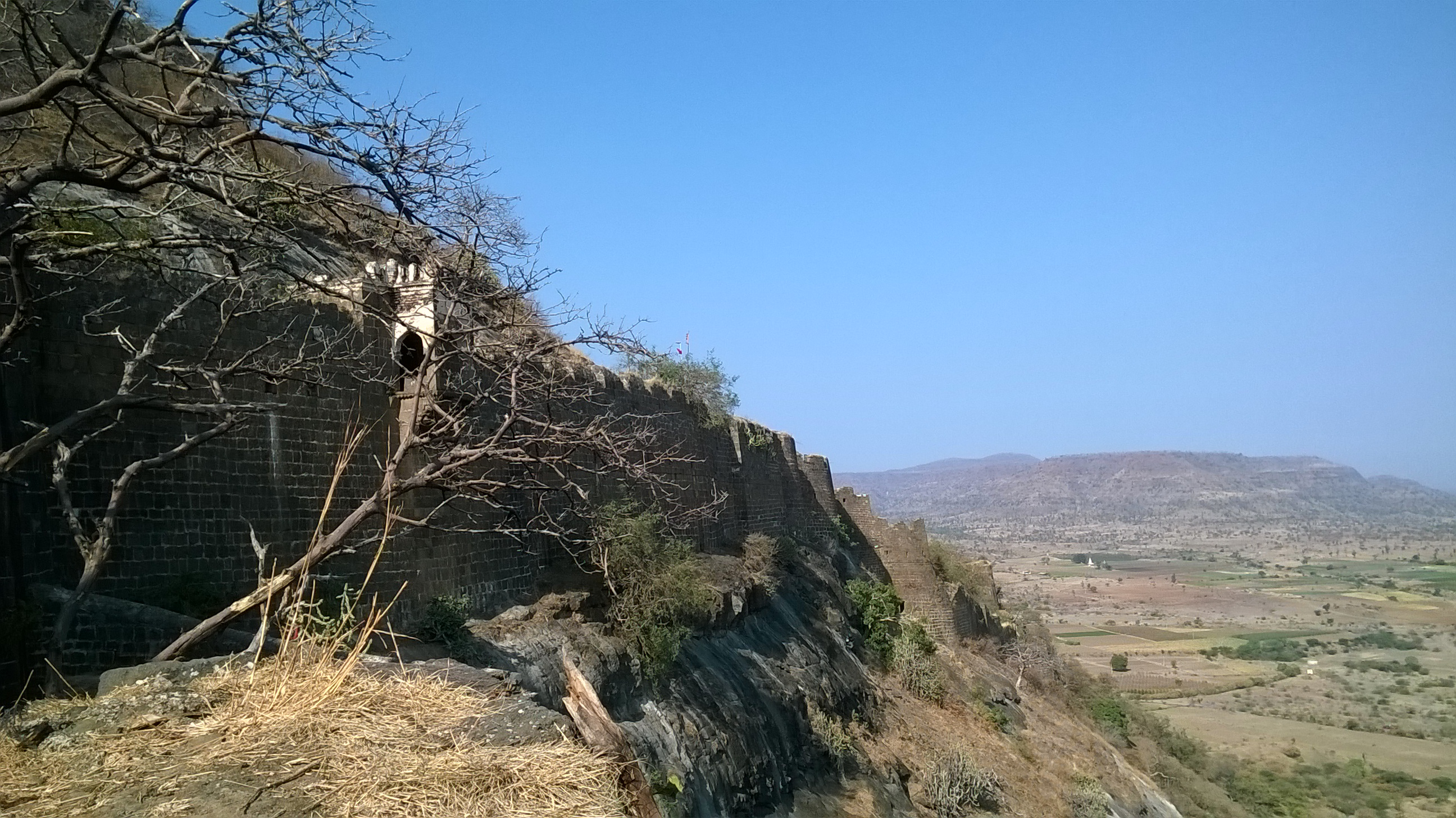
Fortification

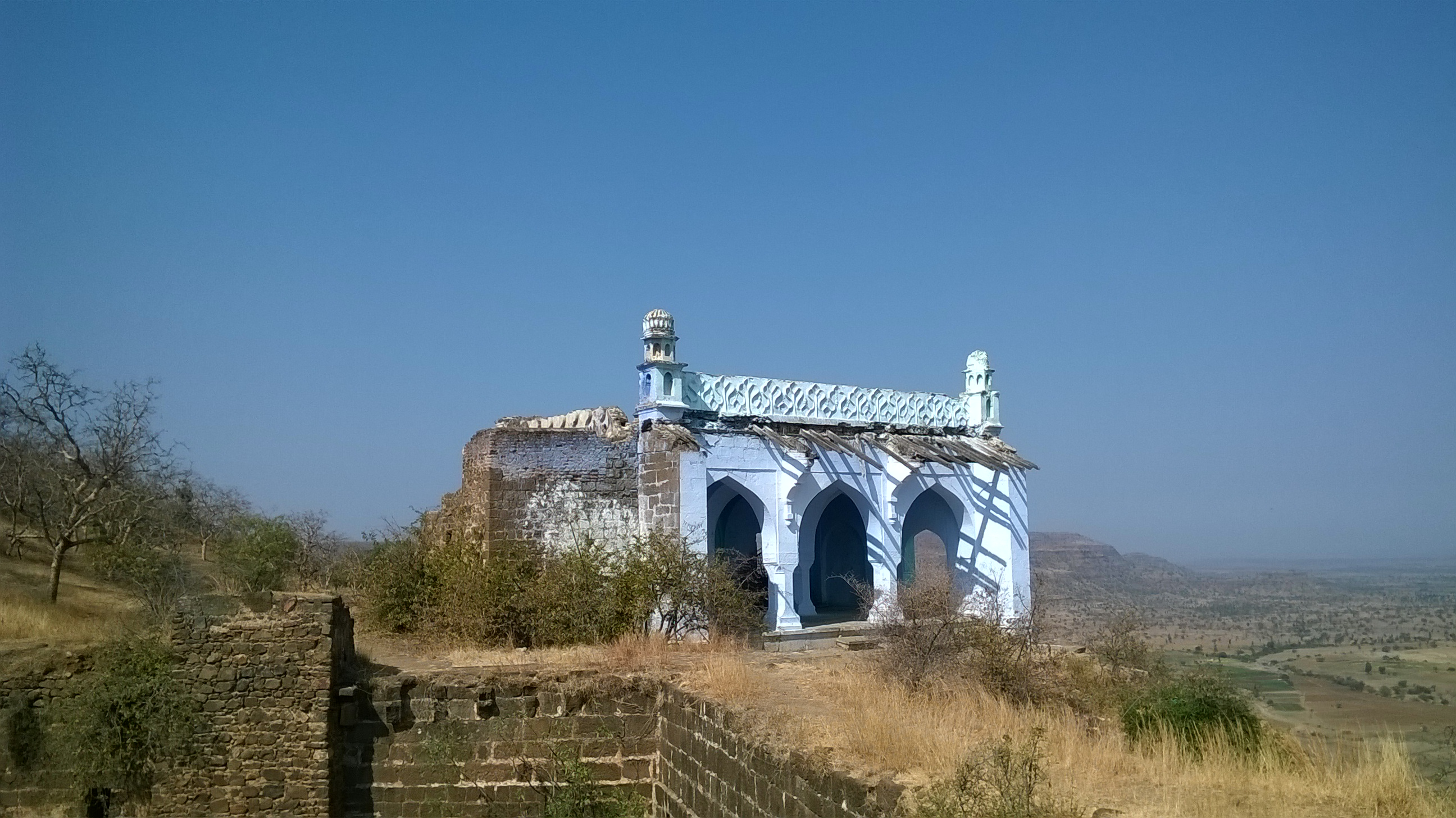
Mosque

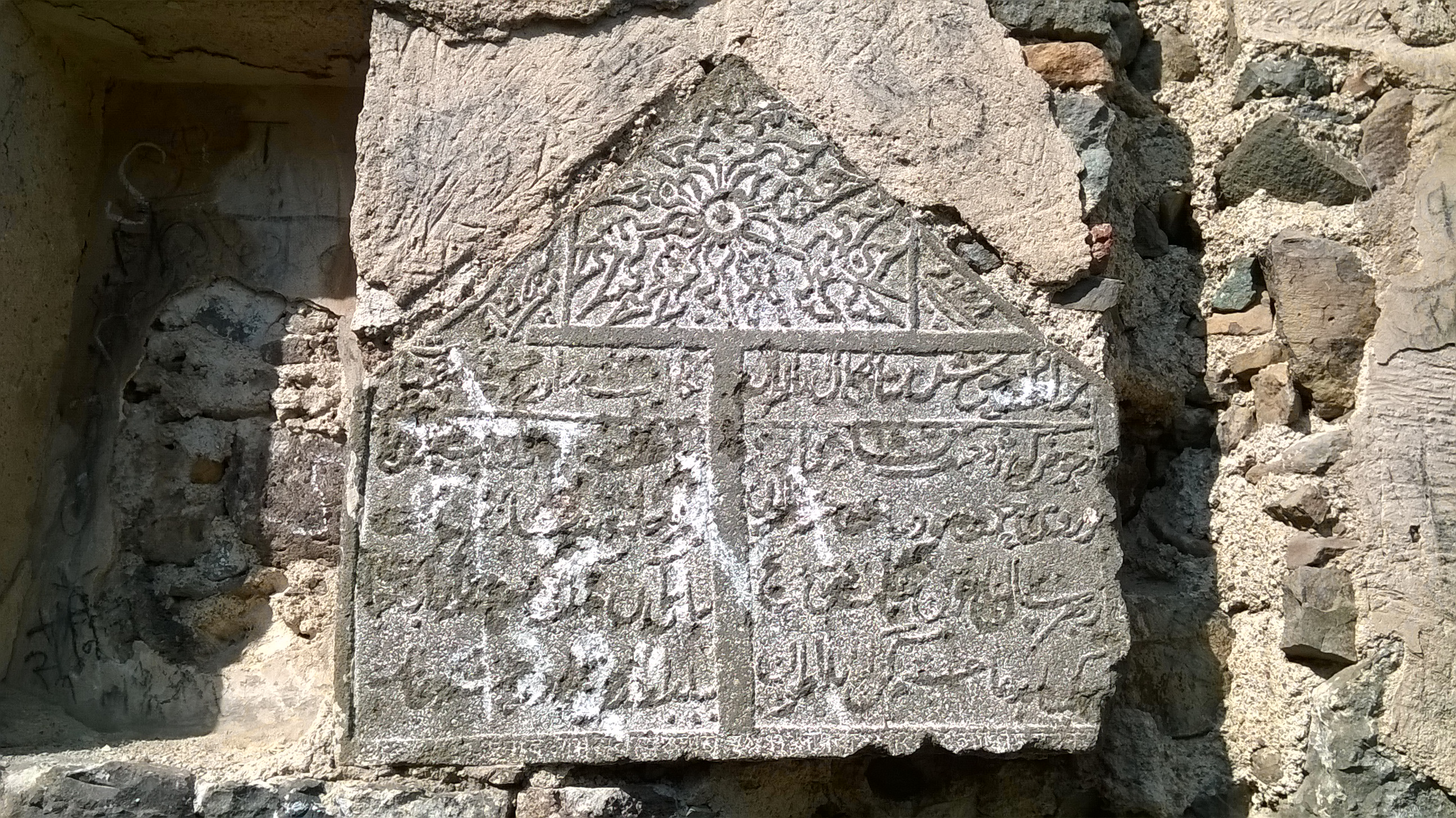
Farsi inscriptions

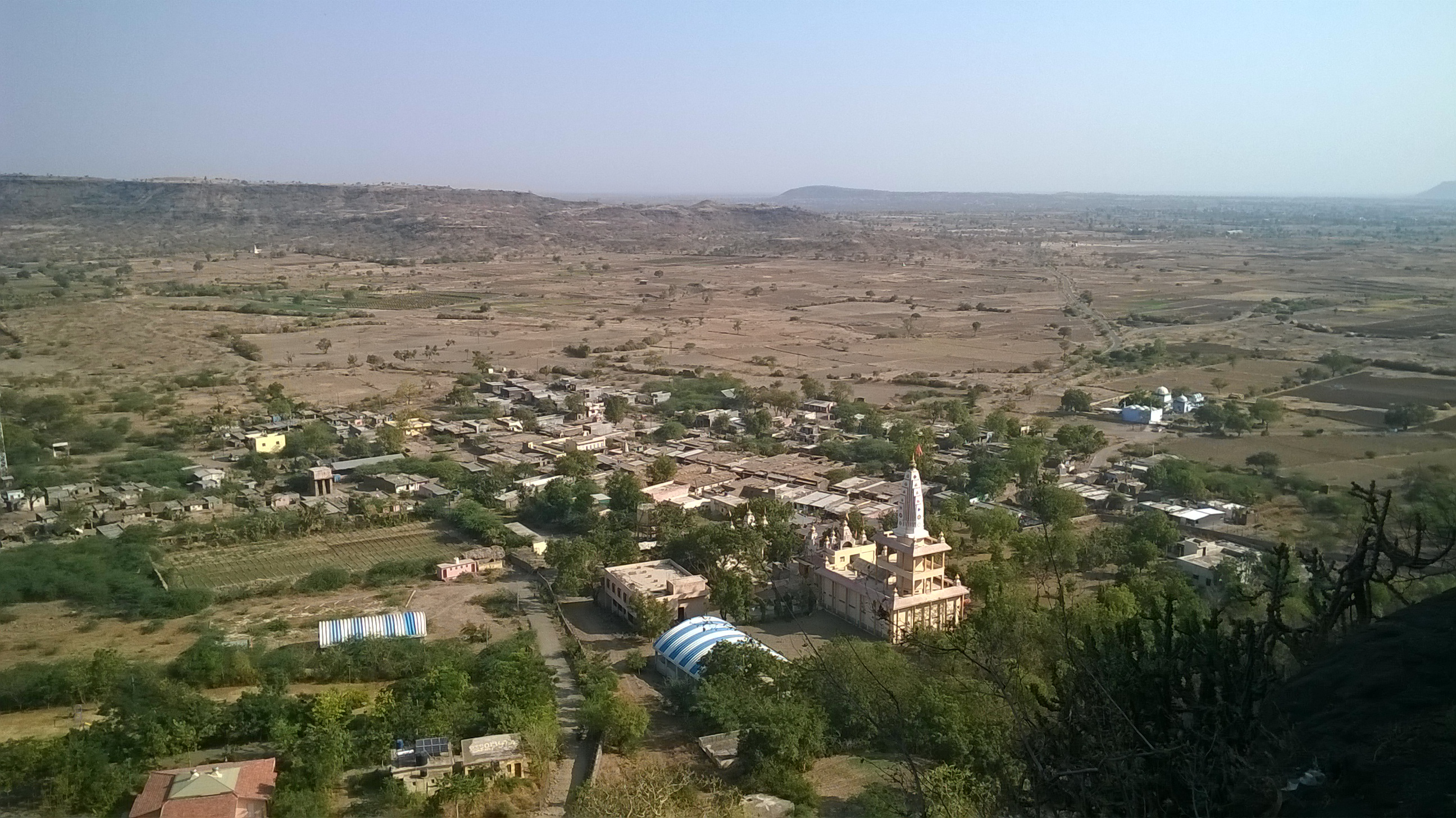
Galna village

== See also ==
- List of forts in Maharashtra
- Nashik
