= Mausam River =

River in Maharashtra, India

The Mokshaganga River (Mosam River) is a river in Nashik District in Maharashtra, India. It is a left tributary of the Girna River.it flow through Malegaon taluka

Of Nashik District.

== Course ==
The Mosam River arises in the Western Ghats, above the village of Golwad, Baglan Taluka, in northern Nashik District, just south of the border with Dhule District. The river flows east and is dammed at Haranbari Dam, with Vide Digar on the right bank (south) and Jaitapur on the left bank (north). It continues east past Antapur to Taharabad where it turns northeast up to Sompur where it turns southeast, and it continues southeast past Jaikheda, Nampur, and Kashti and then turns south into the city of Malegaon where it joins the Girna River at 20°31′51″N 074°31′58″E.
