= Salota fort =

Indian hill fort

- Salota fort, Nashik
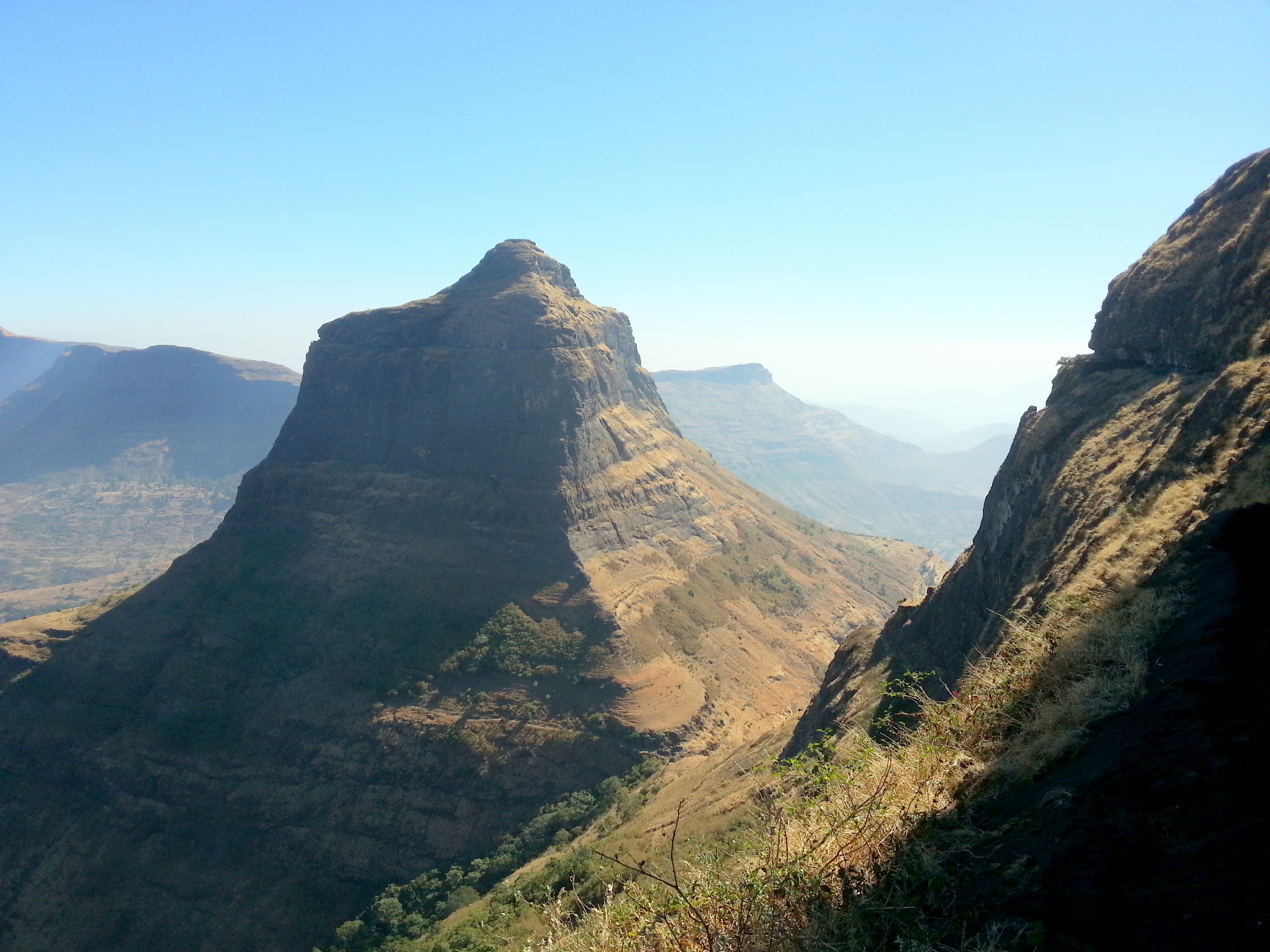
- Salota fort seen from Salher fort

Site information
- Owner: Govt. of India
- Open to the public: yes
- Condition: dilapidated

Location
- Shown within Maharashtra
- Coordinates: 20.722441°N 73.9536738°E
- Height: 1295 m

Site history
- Materials: Stone, lime and lead
- Battles/wars: Battle of Salher
- Events: Massacre of Bahalol Khan

Garrison information
- Occupants: Shivaji, British

Salota fort is a hill fort in Maharashtra, India. It is located in the Baglan region of Nashik. It lies close to the Salher fort.

== History ==
No separate history is known about this fort. The fort adjoins Salher fort. This part of hill was fortified to provide additional protection from the enemy.

== Places to see ==
The fort can be reached after a strenuous climb up the hill. To climb up to the top of the fort require climbing equipment.

There are three doors in a line which lead to the main part of the fort. There are two rock-cut water cisterns at the fort.

== How to reach ==
The nearest village is Waghambe. A continuous trek from Waghambe lead to the col between the Salota and Salher fort. It is about a 1.5-hour walk from Waghambe. A narrow path towards west leads to the Salota. It is better to hire a local guide from the village. There is no place to make a comfortable stay on the fort. Many trekkers prefer to keep their heavy ruck sack at the col and climb the Salota fort first then ascend down, pick up the rucksack and make a night stay on the Salher fort.

== See also ==
- List of forts in Maharashtra
- Khandesh
