= Mora fort =

Mora Fort
- Nashik district, Maharashtra
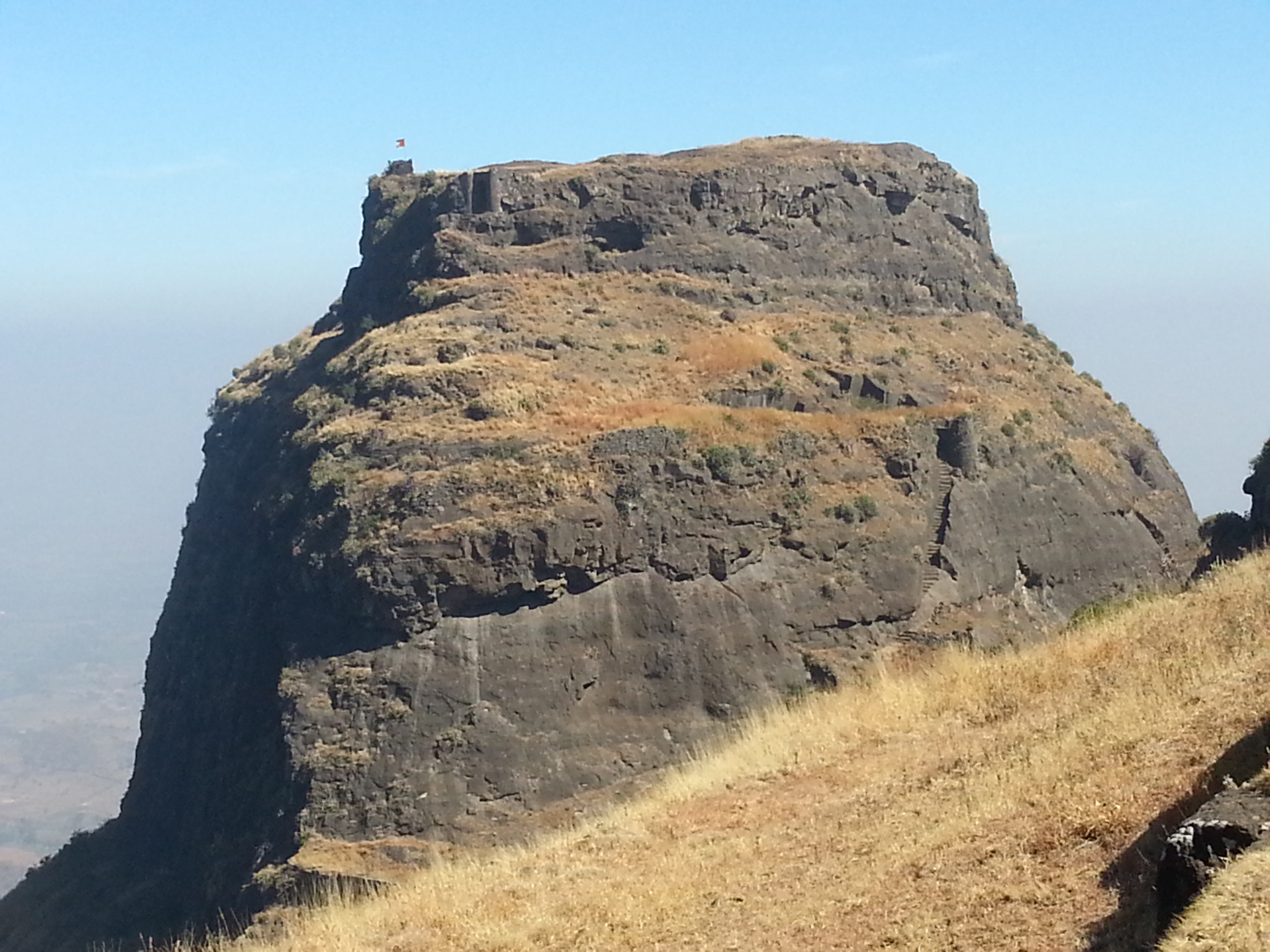
- Mora fort from Mulher

Site information
- Type: Hill fort
- Owner: Government of India
- Open to the public: Yes
- Condition: Ruins

Location
- Shown within Maharashtra
- Coordinates: 20°45′11.1″N 74°03′59.9″E
- Height: 4450 feet

Site history
- Materials: Stone
- Grade: Medium

Mora fort is located in the Baglan area of Nashik district. There are two main hill ranges in Baglan area, the Selbari range is south of the Dolbari hill range. These two ranges run parallel to each other in east-west direction. Moragad is located on Selbari hill range. All these forts were maintained to keep watch on the Burhanpur-Surat ancient commercial road. The road passes between the two hill ranges. Mora fort is a small fort, east of Mulher fort.

== History ==
No separate history is mentioned of this fort. This fort is adjoining the Mulher fort.

== Places to see ==
There are few rock cut cisterns and caves on the fort, There are two rock cut gates. There is no significant construction on the fort. The pathway to the fort is made of rock cut steps. From the top of this fort Mangi-Tungi, Salher, Salota, Hargad, Mulher, Nhavigad forts are easily seen.

== How to reach ==
There is a good motorable road up to the base village Mulher. It takes about two hour to reach the col between Mulher and Mora fort. The path from the col leads to the fort. There are two gates in good condition. There is no good water on the fort, so it is advisable to carry enough water. It takes about one hour to climb and see the fort.

== Gallery ==
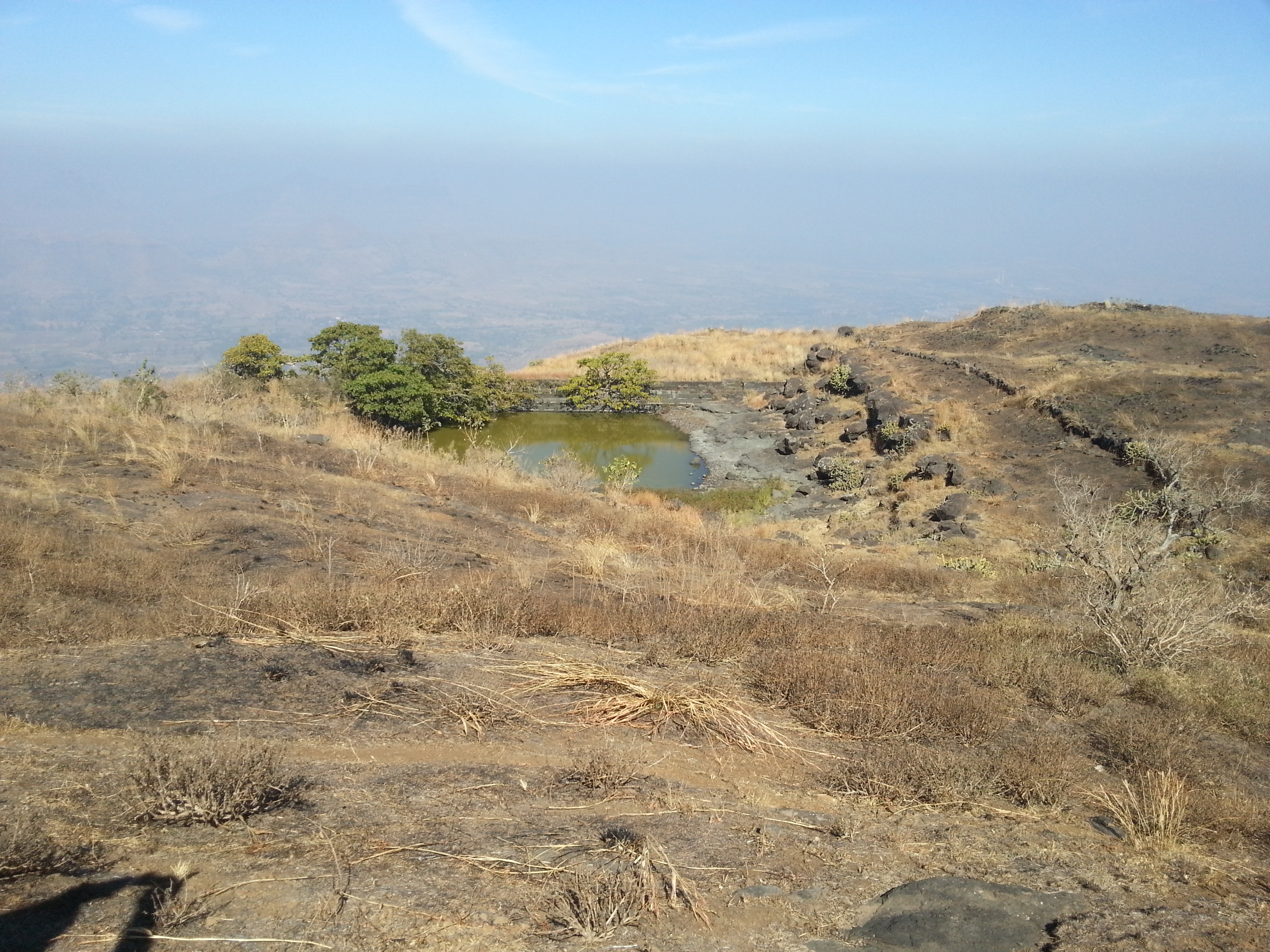
Small Pond on the fort

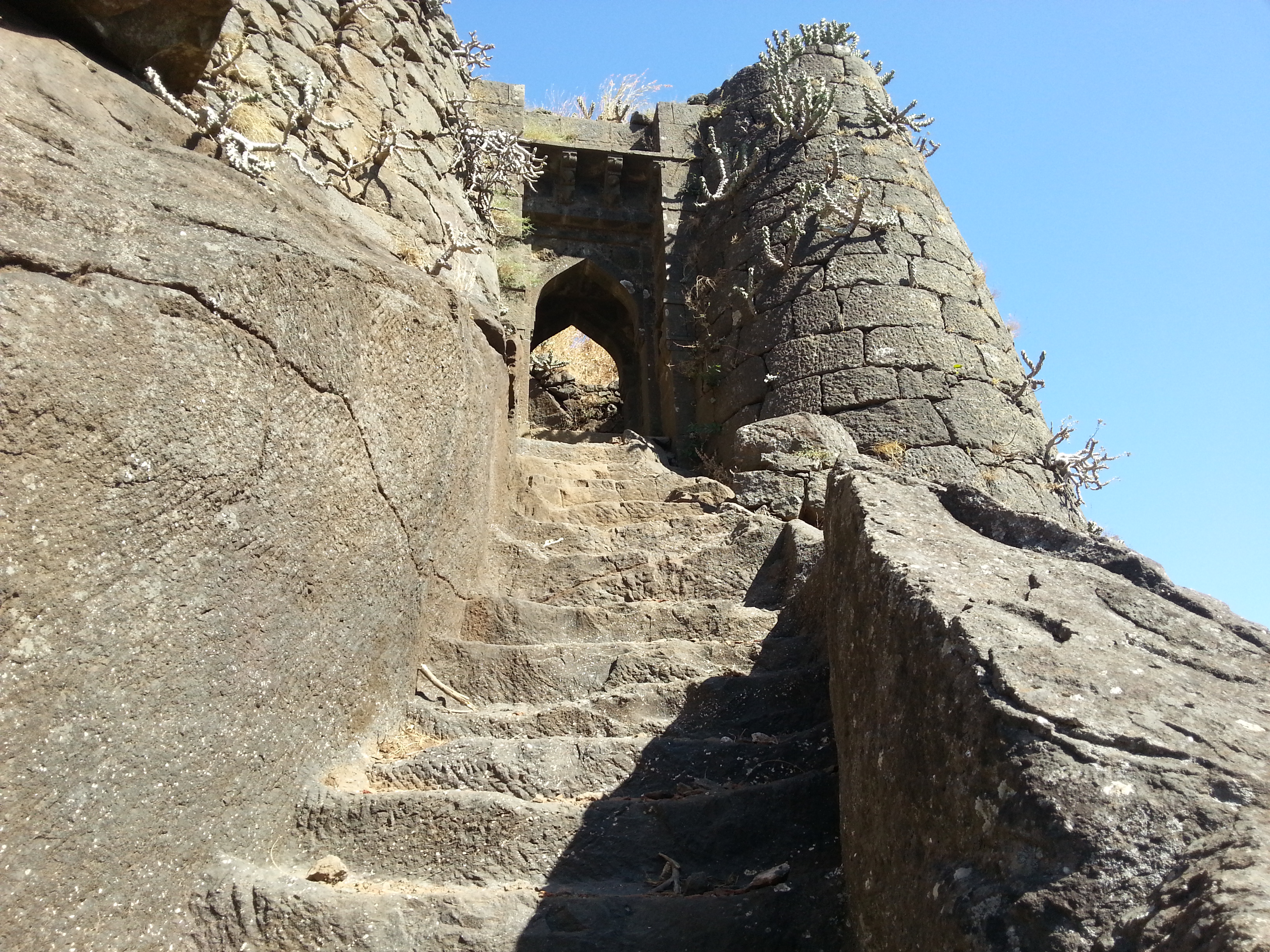
Entrance to the fort

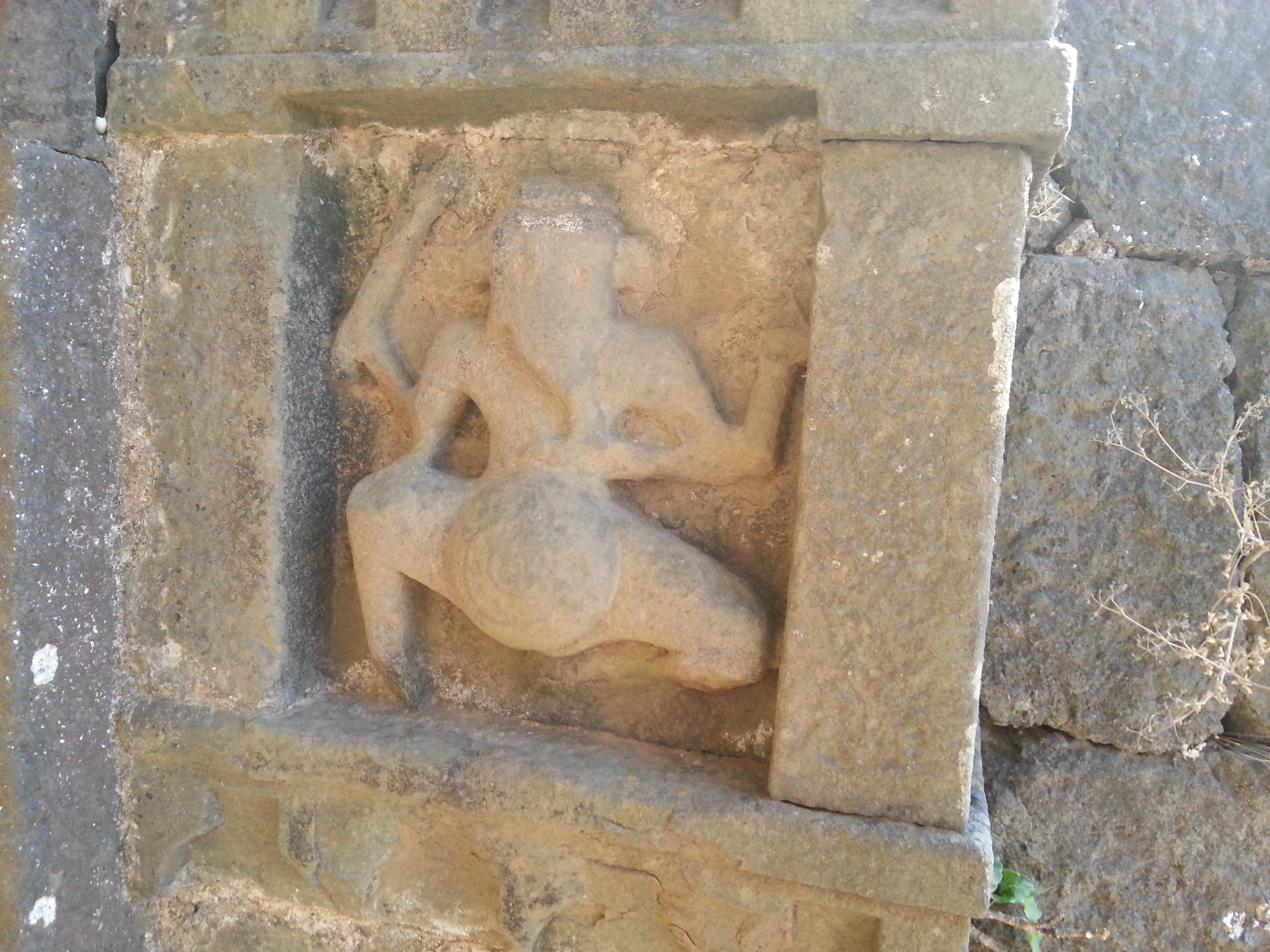
Ganesh Idol with sword
