= Satana, India =

Satana
- City
- Baglan
- Location in Maharashtra, India
- Coordinates: 20.5797°N 74.2160°E
- Country: India
- State: Maharashtra
- District: Nashik

Government
  - Type: MLA
  - MLA (Baglan): Dilip Borse (BJP)
- Elevation: 544 m (1,785 ft)

Population (2011)
  - Total: 37,701
- Demonym: Satanakar

Language
  - Official: Marathi
- Time zone: UTC+5:30 (IST)
- PIN: 423301
- Telephone code: 02555
- ISO 3166 code: IN-MH
- Vehicle registration: MH-41

Satana is a town and a municipal council in Nashik District in the Indian state of Maharashtra. It is in the taluka of Baglan, which is sometimes called Satana, because of the city's dominance in the taluka. The name "Satana" is derived from "Śāṭyāyani" one of the minor Upanishads of the Muktika canon.

== Geography ==
Satana is located at 20°35′37″N 74°12′00″E. It has an average elevation of 544 metres (1784 feet).

This tehsil includes historical forts like Tilwan, Pisol, Salher. Forest in Avati is famous in Nashik district.

== Demographics ==
As of 2001 India census, Satana had a population of 37,701. Males constitute 52% of the population and females 48%. Satana has an average literacy rate of 75%, higher than the national average of 59.5%: male literacy is 79%, and female literacy is 70%. In Satana, 12% of the population is under 6 years of age.

== History ==
Dev Mameledar Yashwantrao Maharaj is the adorable deity of Satana. A Samadhi of Yashwant Maharaj and a big temple have been built in this city. A yatra is held in Margsheesh every year on the occasion of Yashwantrao Maharaj's birth anniversary in Satana. Devotees come from far and wide to see this Yatra. It is said by old people that in 1870, Yashwantrao Maharaj was given the title of "Mamledar", a Government official of Satana.

Yashwantrao Maharaj was a staunch devotee of Swami Samarth. He came to this city to work as a case worker, but became a god. After that there was a severe drought in Satana city in 1800, the residents had no food and drink facilities. At that time Yashwantrao Maharaj helped these people from the government box. Maharaj used to give money to people by taking money out of the box, but not even one rupee was missing from the box. Then people realized that this was not an ordinary man, but God incarnate. After all this, the top government officials came to know that Yashwantrao Maharaj had donated the wealth from the government treasury to the common people, while he was present at that time. But when the officials realized that one rupee in the box was not reduced, they felt very helpless. It is said by some locals that Lord Vishnu appeared to Maharaja after donating his wealth.

Religions in Satana
Religion	Percent
Hindus	77%
Muslims	14%
Buddhists	8.6%
Christians	1.4%
Jains	2.7%
Others†	0.3%
Distribution of religions †Includes Sikhs (0.2%), Buddhists (<0.2%).

== People from Satana ==
- Upasni Maharaj, born Kashinath Govindrao Upasni,[1] (5 May 1870 – 24 December 1941 [2]) was considered by his disciples to be a satguru.
