= Sambhajirao Angre I =

Prime minister of Gwalior State

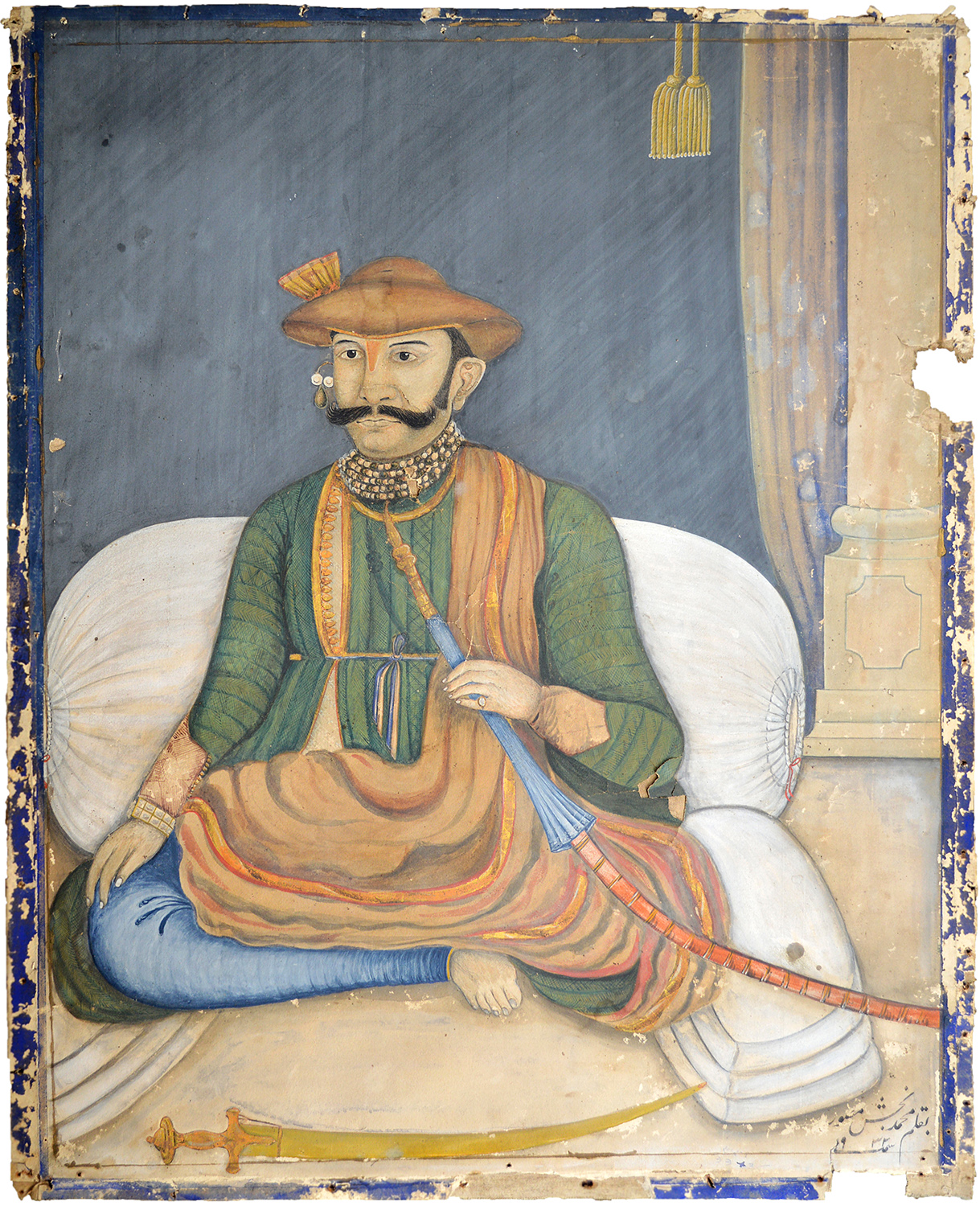
- Sambhajirao Angre I

Prime minister of the Gwalior Kingdom
- Reign: ?-1848
- Predecessor: Baburao Angre
- Died: 1848
- Issue: Baburao Appasaheb Angre
- Father: Mawji Angre
- Religion: Hinduism

Sardar Sambhajirao Angre I was the prime minister of the Gwalior Kingdom during the rule of Jankoji Rao Scindia II and Jayajirao Scindia. He was the great-grandson of the famous Maratha Navy admiral Kanhoji Angre and grandson of Yesaji Angre.

== Career ==
Yesaji Angre died around 1734, in disputes among the Angre family. In search of opportunity, Yesaji Angre's sons Mawji and Baburao (Sambhajirao's father and uncle respectively), moved to Gwalior to live with their sister Maina Bai, who was the mother of the ruler, Daulat Rao Scindia.

Sambhaji's uncle, Baburao Angre, became an important member of Daulat Rao Scindia’s court, serving as prime minister and commander-in-chief. Baburao Angre was childless, hence he adopted his brother's son Sambhajirao. Forthwith, Sambhaji earned a reputation for curbing the rampant and widespread banditry in Malwa. He later became a trusted advisor and the prime minister for Jankoji Rao Scindia II, Daulat Rao Scindia’s successor.

In 1839, when Raghoji Angre II, ruler of the Colaba State died in 1838 without a male heir, Sambhajirao tried to claim the kingship of the kingdom. His claims were supported by the British Resident of Gwalior, but his claims were investigated and rejected by the Bombay Government.

Jankoji II had no male heir to succeed him, hence to prevent the British from implementing the Doctrine of lapse and annexing Gwalior, it is said that Sambhajirao rode out in search of a child from the extended family of the Scindia dynasty in order for Jankoji to adopt as his son. He came upon a group of young boys playing marbles and noticed one of them making a particularly difficult shot from a long distance. Sambhajirao took it as a sign and almost kidnapped the eight-year-old boy, which was Jayajirao Scindia. The adoption rituals were hurriedly completed on 7 February 1843, shortly before Jankoji died. Sambhajirao served as Jayajirao Scindia's prime minister for five years until he died in 1848.

Sambhajirao Angre's palatial residence, Sambhaji Vilas, in the old town of Gwalior, still stands and is currently being operated as a guesthouse by his descendants.
