= Colaba State =

Former Maratha principality (1698–1839)

- 1698–1839
- Status: State within the Maratha Confederacy (1698–1818); Protectorate of the East India Company (1818–1839)
- Capital: Kolaba
- Religion: Hinduism
- Government: Military Regime
- Sarkhel
  - 1689 – 1729 (first): Kanhoji I
  - 1839 (last): Kanhoji II
- Historical era: Early modern
  - Established: 1698
  - Disestablished: 1839
Preceded by	Succeeded by
Maratha Empire; Siddis of Janjira	British India
- Today part of: India

Colaba State, also known as Culaba State or Angria's Colaba was a Kingdom and later princely state in India. It was founded by the famous Maratha Navy admiral Kanhoji Angre in 1698. The ruling family of the state, the Angre, were skilled seafarers who controlled the western coast of India from the late 17th century- to the first half of the 18th century, until British forces and those of the Maratha Peshwa Balaji Baji Rao destroyed the major portion of their navy in the Battle of Vijaydurg.

== History ==
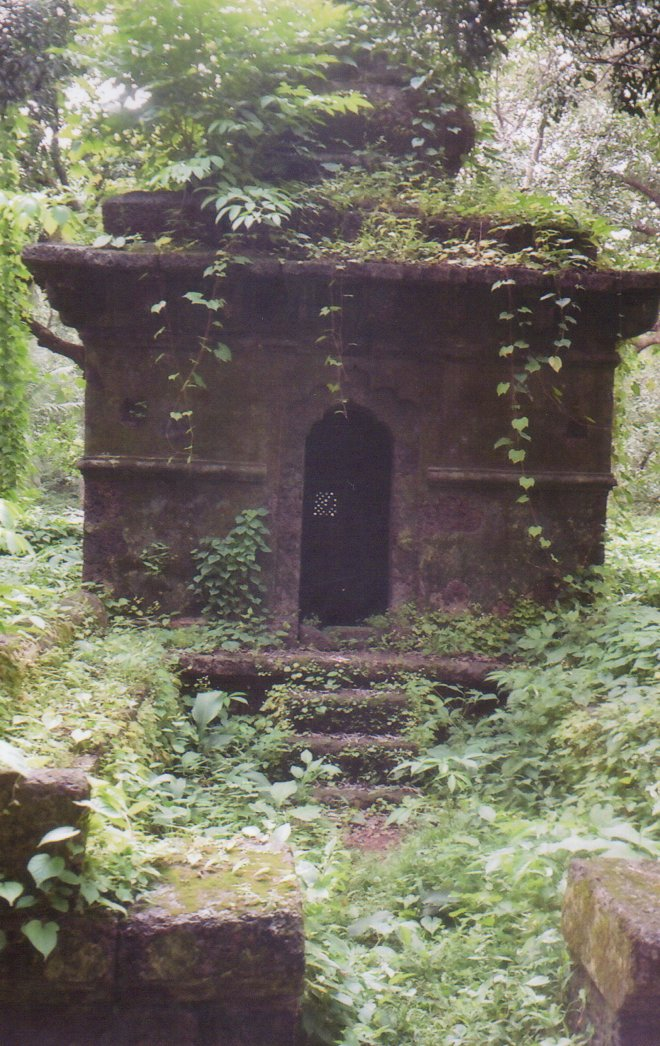
Tomb of Sambhaji Angre

=== Angre Family ===
Kanhoji Angre was a highly successful Maratha captain and rose through the ranks to become Grand Admiral of the Maratha Navy in 1707. Colaba was one of his major bases of privateering operations. In 1713, Kanhoji Angre started to grow increasingly independent, hence an army was sent against Kanhoji headed by the Peshwa Bahiroji Pingale. Bahiroji Pingale was thoroughly defeated by Kanhoji in this battle and was taken prisoner. After the defeat of the Peshwa, Kanhoji was planning to march on Satara ruled by Chhatrapati Shahu. Balaji Vishwanath Bhatt negotiated with the latter for the release of Bahiroji Pingale and gave 26 Forts to Kanhoji, thus the Colaba State came into existence.

The state was then successively ruled by the sons of Kanhoji: Sekhoji Angre (1729–1733), Sambhaji Angre (1733–1742), Tulaji Angre (1743–1756) and Manaji Angre I (1733–1758). All of them were skilled seamen, however, the division of the Angre coastal territory into north and south under Manaji (at Kolaba) and Sambhaji (at Vijaydurg) respectively, greatly reduced the family's power. Tulaji Angre, according to many scholars, even surpassed the achievements of Kanhoji in capturing vessels and exercising influence on almost the whole west coast of India. However, he alienated himself from the Maratha Peshwa, Balaji Baji Rao which led to his capture by the East India Company and Peshwa's forces at the Battle of Vijaydurg in 1756. The battle led to the destruction of a major portion of the Angre navy and significantly reduced their influence. Manaji Angre I continued to loyally serve the Peshwa and ruled well, increasing the revenue of his kingdom, until his death in 1758. He was succeeded by his son Raghuji Angre as ruler of Kolaba, who had a successful reign.

=== Angres of Kolaba ===
As mentioned above, Raghuji Angre succeeded his father Manaji Angre as ruler of Kolaba in 1758. In the same year, the Siddis of Janjira attacked the kingdom, destroyed many temples and burnt many villages, however Raghuji drove them out with the Peshwa's aid. Subsequently, he attacked the Underi fort, took it after a severe struggle on 28 January 1759 and presented it to the Peshwa as a gift for his help against the Siddis of Janjira. The Padmadurg fort was also captured. Janjira would have been captured as well, if Sadashivrao Bhau had not been recalled to the north. Raghuji continued to serve the Peshwa loyally but he was accused of attacking English ships. After him, none of the Angres ever practiced privateering. The kingdom was prosperous and the people lived well during his rule. James Forbes, a sea captain of the East India Company, visited Raghuji Angre in 1770 and described that the country was fertile and prosperous, and he was treated with lavish hospitality.

Raghuji's death in 1793 led to a succession crisis in Kolaba. His infant son Manaji Angre II was placed on the throne under the protection of Jai Singh Angre, the karbhari (an illegitimate son of Raghuji Angre), without the approval of the Peshwa (prime minister). Anandibai Bhonsle, the wife of the late king, hatched a plot to kill Jai Singh Angre as she envied his influence. The plot was thwarted, and Anandibai along with her family members was banished from Kolaba. Subsequently, Anandibai raised an army, besieged the Kolaba fort and imprisoned Jai Singh. After the tides turned back and forth multiple times, Jai Singh Angre sought the help of Baburao Angre, the wazir (prime minister) and brother-in-law of Daulat Rao Scindia, the king of Gwalior.

Baburao Angre was a member of the Angre family, and he secretly wanted to take Kolaba for himself. Baburao Angre set out for Kolaba, and after a number of victories against different members of the Angre family, became the ruler of Kolaba. Baburao died in 1813, and for a year after his death the state was managed by his widow. Then Manaji Angre II proclaimed himself chief and his claim was recognized by the Peshwa, who received the island of Khanderi and twenty villages in return for his support. These villages were restored to the Angres in 1818, a few days before the out-break of hostilities between the Peshwa and the English in the Third Anglo-Maratha War. This political instability caused the yearly revenue fell to about Rs. 3,00,000. Manaji Angre II died in 1817 after a turbulent reign.

During the Third Anglo-Maratha War, after the capture of Visapur and Lohagad fort near the top of the Bhor Ghat mountain pass, Lieutenant-Colonel David Prother, on 17 March 1818, made arrangements for the capture of all places of strength in Kolaba. Tala and Ghosala fell almost without resistance, and the British troops marched from Indapur to Mahad. Major Hall was sent to Raigad with 200 Europeans and 200 sepoys, after a stubborn siege of eleven days, the fort was surrendered by the Marathas.

Manaji was succeeded by his son Raghuji Angre II, who was fourteen years old at the time. During Raghuji's minority the State was managed by his late father's minister Vinayak Parashuram Biwalkar. On reaching manhood, Raghuji was unable to free himself from the influence of karbhari Biwalkar, who had won the support of all officers and ruined the finances by extravagant expenditure. In June 1822, the relations between the Kolaba state and the British Government were fixed by a treaty under which the British supremacy was recognized, jagirdars and inamdars were guaranteed the possession of their lands, and provision was made for the relations of the ruler's family.

It was said by the local people that Raghuji's rule under the influence of Biwalkar "was marked by great cruelty and oppression". Years after his rule, it was remembered as the rule of "Angarak" or Mars (the planet of evil influence in Hindu astrology). Raghuji Angre II died on 26 December 1838. He left three widows, of whom Yashodabai was pregnant with the late ruler's child. Mr. Courtenay was sent to Kolaba to prevent a succession crisis of any sort, and reported on 29 January 1839 to the government that Yashodabai had given birth to a son. Before the recognition of Raghuji's posthumous son the succession to the Kolaba State was claimed by Sambhajirao Angre, the prime minister of Jankoji Rao Scindia II and Baburao Angre's nephew. Sambhajirao Angre's claim was supported by the resident of Gwalior, but was rejected by the Bombay Government.

=== Annexation ===
Yashodabai's son was recognized as ruler with the regal name Kanhoji Angre II on 6 February 1839. Vinayak Parshuram Biwalkar, the karbhari, was to manage the affairs of state. However, Kanhoji II died shortly after on 21 March 1839 and with his death the legitimate line of the Angre family became extinct. The fort of Kolaba had to be handed over to the English in the same year. Raghuji II's widows applied for leave to adopt an heir. But in 1840, the state was annexed on the grounds of the Doctrine of lapse and that small princely states like Kolaba had only stood in the way of progress in the region. All personal property of the Angres was distributed among the surviving members of the family and the three widows of Raghuji Angre II got annual pensions.

== Gwalior branch ==
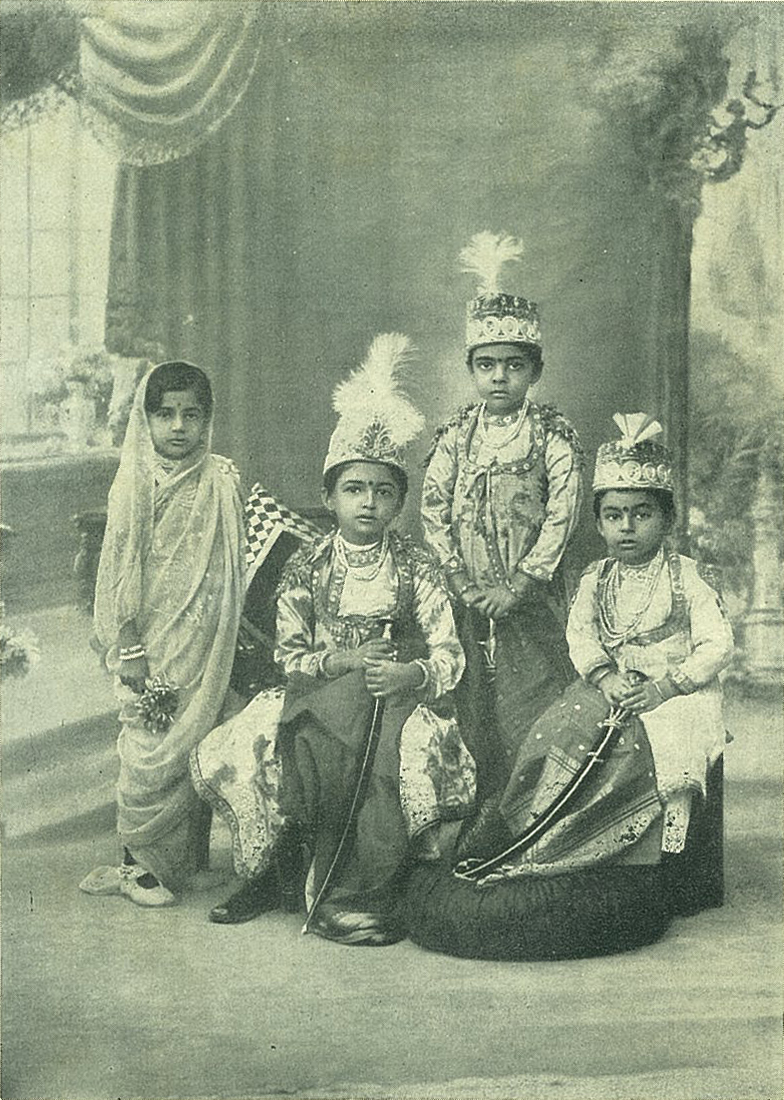
Children of Chandroji Angre

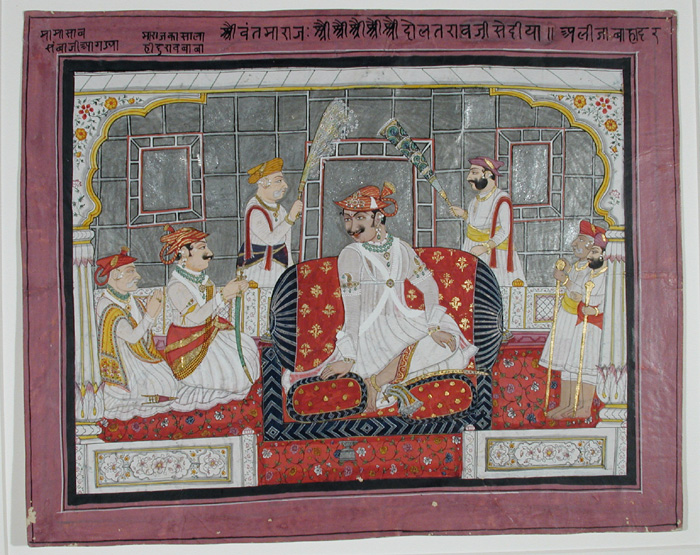
Daulat Rao Scindia with his maternal uncle Sambhajirao Angre and brother-in-law Hindu Rao

There was a branch family of the Angres at Gwalior which had served the Scindia rulers of Gwalior as prime ministers and other influential positions for over two centuries. At times they tried to claim the throne of Kolaba for themselves, but failed. Chandrojirao Angre, its descendant, distinguished himself as the champion of Hinduism and was popularly called "Dharmvir". Chandrojirao Angre's son Sambhaji Angre was an influential politician and strong supporter of Vijaya Raje Scindia, and was involved in a legal fight against Madhavrao Scindia over property issues and the will of the late Vijaya Raje Scindia.

== Coins ==
The only coins that were struck by the Angre government were the Alibag-Kolaba or "old Alibag rupee" the Janjira-Kolaba or "new Alibag rupee" (issued by the influential karbhari Vinayak Parshuram Biwalkar), and the Alibag copper pice. The old Alibag-Kolaba rupee was the first in circulation and bore a Persian inscription. The new Janjira-Kolaba rupee had on both sides the word "sri" accompanied by a small drilled hole.

== List of rulers ==
- Kanhoji I Angre (1698–1729)
- Sekhoji Angre (1729–1733)
- Sambhaji Angre (1733–1742)
- Manaji I Angre (1733–1758), jointly with Sambhaji Angre (1733–1742) and then Tulaji Angre (1742–1755)
- Raghuji I Angre (1758–1793)
- Manaji II Angre (1793-c.1798), first reign
- Baburao Angre (c. 1798–1813)
- Manaji II Angre (1813–1817), second reign
- Raghuji II Angre (1817-26 December 1838)
- Kanhoji II Angre (6 February 1839 – 21 March 1839)

== See also ==
- Kanhoji Angre
- Tulaji Angre
