= Angre =

Angre may refer to:

- Angre, Honnelles, Hainaut, Belgium
- Chandroji Angre, Indian politician
- Kanhoji Angre (1669–1729), Indian admiral of the Maratha Navy
- Ravindranath Angre (born 1956), Indian police officer
- Sambhaji Angre (1920–2008), Indian politician

== See also ==
- Anger (disambiguation)
- Angres, Pas-de-Calais department, France
- Robert Aunger (fl. 1390s), English Politician
