= Yesaji Angre =

Military commander from Maratha Empire

- Died: c. 1734; Kolaba Fort, Alibag
- Spouse(s): Krishnabai, Kashibai
- Children: Mawji Angre, Baburao Angre, Mainabai
- Relatives: Kanhoji Angre (father); Gahinabai (mother); Dhondji Angre (brother); Sekhoji Angre (half-brother); Sambhaji Angre (half-brother); Tulaji Angre (half-brother); Manaji Angre (half-brother)
- Military career
- Allegiance: Maratha Empire
- Service: Maratha Navy
- Service years: ?- c. 1734

Yesaji Angre was a military commander and the youngest son of Kanhoji Angre, the famed Maratha Navy admiral from his wife Gahinabai Bhonsle. He spent his naval career under the service of his elder half-brother Sambhaji Angre. The Gwalior branch of the Angre family was descended from him.

== Career ==
After the death of Sekhoji Angre, the sarkhel (supreme commander or admiral) of the Maratha Navy, his younger brother Sambhaji Angre succeeded him as sarkhel. Upon Sambhaji Angre's succession as sarkhel, Yesaji Angre was given charge of administrative and civil duties of the Kolaba Fort. Shortly after, Manaji Angre quarreled with his brothers (including Yesaji), and unable to hold his ground against his brothers' superior force, took shelter with the Portuguese at Lower Chaul or Revdanda. From Revdanda Manaji gathered a few troops, launched a surprise attack on the Kolaba Fort and successfully captured it. With the Peshwa's aid, he also defeated and captured Yesaji. According to the Maritime History Society, Yesaji was subsequently executed, while the Kolaba district gazetteer does not mention it.

== Personal life ==
Yesaji Angre was the last and youngest child born to Kanhoji Angre, a famed and powerful admiral in the Maratha Navy, by his third wife Gahinabai of the Bhonsle family. Dhondji was his elder sibling, Sekhoji and Sambhaji, were the sons of Kanhoji from Rajubai and two sons- Manaji and Tulaji, were his half brothers from Lakshmibai.

Yesaji fathered three children, two of them sons- Mawji by his wife Krishnabai and Baburao by his wife Kashibai. The third was a daughter named Maina Bai, who married Anandrao Scindia, nephew of Mahadji Shinde and became the mother of Daulat Rao Scindia, the ruler of Gwalior Kingdom. His children settled at the court of the Scindia kings of Gwalior, and achieved remarkable success, serving as hereditary prime ministers or in other influential positions for over two centuries.

== Descendants ==
At times the powerful Angre family of Gwalior tried to claim the throne of Kolaba for themselves, but failed. Chandrojirao Angre, Yesaji's descendant, distinguished himself as the champion of Hinduism and was popularly called "Dharmvir". Chandrojirao Angre's son Sambhaji Angre was an influential politician and strong supporter of Vijaya Raje Scindia, and was involved in a legal fight against Madhavrao Scindia over property issues and the will of the late Vijaya Raje Scindia.

== Popular culture ==
=== Films and television ===
- In the 2019 Indian Marathi historical film Fatteshikast, he is portrayed by Ankit Mohan.
- In the 2022 Indian Marathi-language historical film Sher Shivraj, he is portrayed by Sushruta Mankani.
- In the 2026 Indian Marathi-language historical film Raja Shivaji, he is portrayed by Kapil Honrao.
