= Gwalior campaign =

Campaign of the British conquest of India

- Part of the British conquest of India
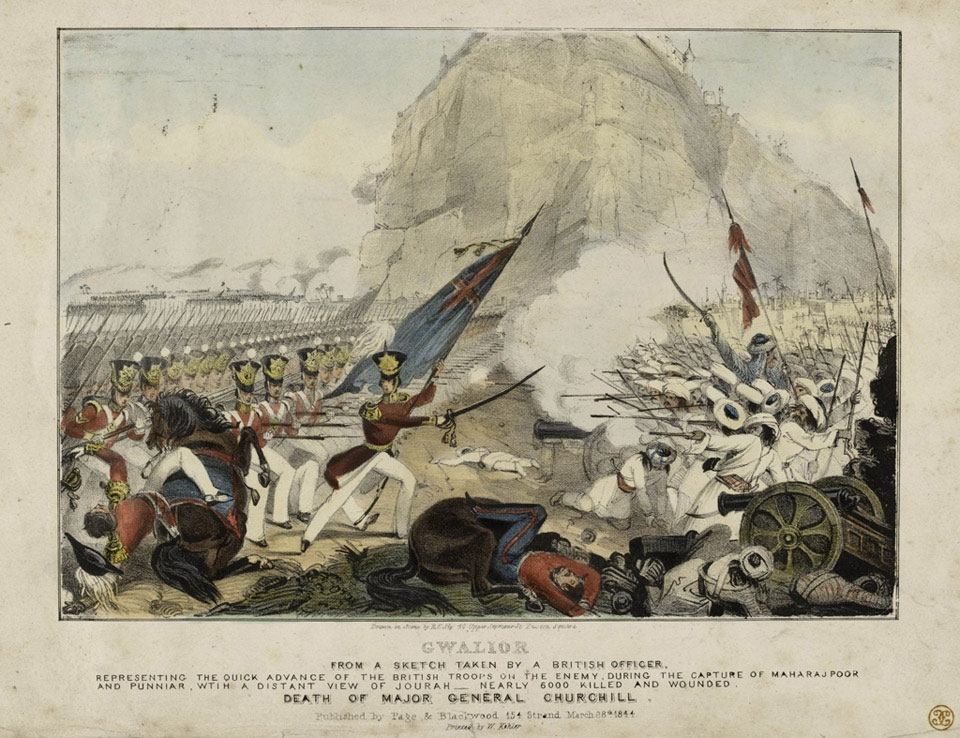
- Death of Major General Churchill, Gwalior Battle of Maharajpore
| Date | 29 December 1843 |
| Location | Gwalior State |
| Result | British victory |

Belligerents
| United Kingdom; East India Company | Gwalior State |

Commanders and leaders
| Hugh Gough; Charles Churchill † | Jayajirao Scindia (Minor); Tara Scindia |

Casualties and losses
| 914 | 2,000–3,000 56 guns captured |

The Gwalior campaign was fought between the British Empire and Scindia forces in Gwalior in India, December 1843.

== Background ==
The Scindia Dynasty had controlled most of central and northern India but fell to the British in 1818, giving the British the control over almost all of the Indian subcontinent. On February 7, 1843, Jankojirao Scindia II the Maharaja of Gwalior died without a direct heir, leaving a very large, semi-independent Gwalior army, succession disputes and court factionalism, this made British worried that the powerful Gwalior army could destabilize northern India or challenge British influence, this simultaneously led to British intervention.

A young child named Bhagirath (later known by his regnal name Jayajirao Scindia) was appointed as the Maharaja of Gwalior with Mama Sahib being chosen as regent. Jankojirao's widow Tara Bai Scindia, came under the influence of Dada Khasgiwala, the comptroller of her household, an unscrupulous adventurer who wished to get all the power into his own hands. He succeeded in driving Mama Sahib from the state and became minister. He filled all senior appointments with his relatives, ending in the assemblage of large bodies of troops who threatened an attack on Sironj, where Mama Sahib was then residing. As it was essential to secure peace, the British Government decided to intervene.

Lord Ellenborough tried installing a regent amenable to British control, citing instability after Jankoji's death, asked Scindias to reduced their army and infantry, but Tara Bai opposed it and did not comply. Lord Ellenborough then formed the Army of Exercise near Agra. After several attempts of negotiation failed, the British, under the command of General Sir Hugh Gough advanced in a two-pronged attack which culminated in the battles of Maharajpore and Punniar both fought on 29 December 1843.

== Battle of Maharajpura ==
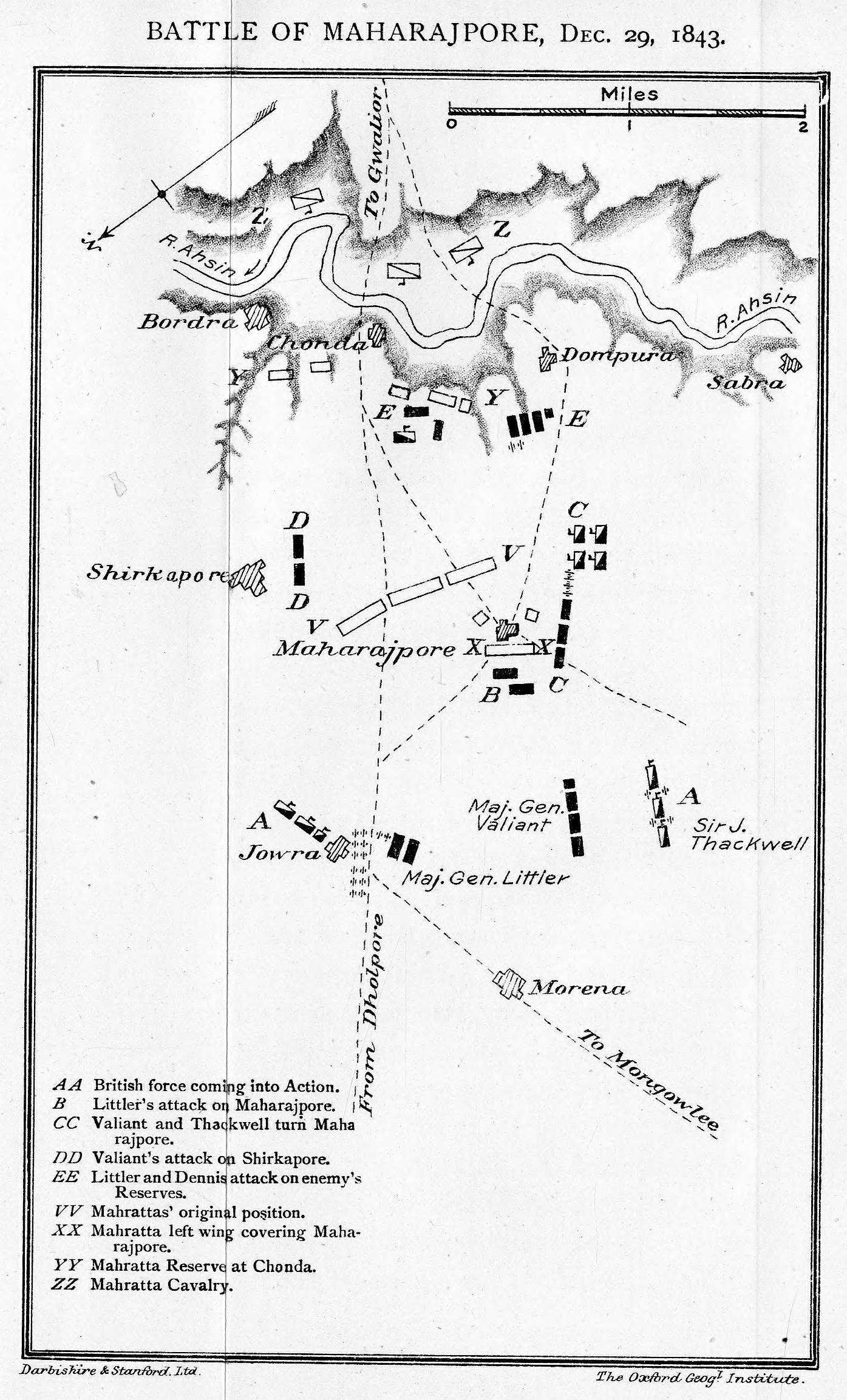
Map of the battle of Maharajpura, 29 December 1843

The Scindia army had 14 battalions, 1,000 artillerymen with 100 guns, 10,000 cavalry horsemen and infantry of 25,000 foot soldiers stationed at Maharajpura considered one of the strongest and largest army among all princely states.The British had the 40th Regiment of Foot with the 2nd and 16th Native Infantry Regiments forming the central column, the 39th Regiment of Foot with the 56th Native Infantry Regiment and a field battery forming the left column and the 16th Lancers with two troops of horse artillery as well as other artillery forming the right column.

The centre column advanced to attack where they believed the main enemy force was located. However, during the night the Scindia forces moved and the British were surprised as they came under heavy fire from the Scindia artillery in their new positions. The central column then received the order to take the battery positions, which they did under continuous heavy fire from shot, grape, canister, and chain. The guns were to the south-east of Maharajpore, with two battalions of Scindia troops for each battery, and in Maharajpore with seven battalions for each battery. The British engaged the Gwalior forces in hand-to-hand fighting, both sides taking heavy casualties, and cleared the positions. British casualties were 106 killed, 684 wounded and seven missing. The Scindia forces lost about 2,000 men, and included the capture of 56 pieces of artillery.

== Battle of Punniar ==
The Gwalior forces at Punniar (29 December 1843) numbered about 12,000 men and occupied the high ground near Mangore. As the British force under General Grey approached, they immediately attacked the Scindia troops positions, routing them from the hill. British losses were 217 men and 11 horses, whilst the defending Scindias lost about 1,000 men.

== Aftermath ==
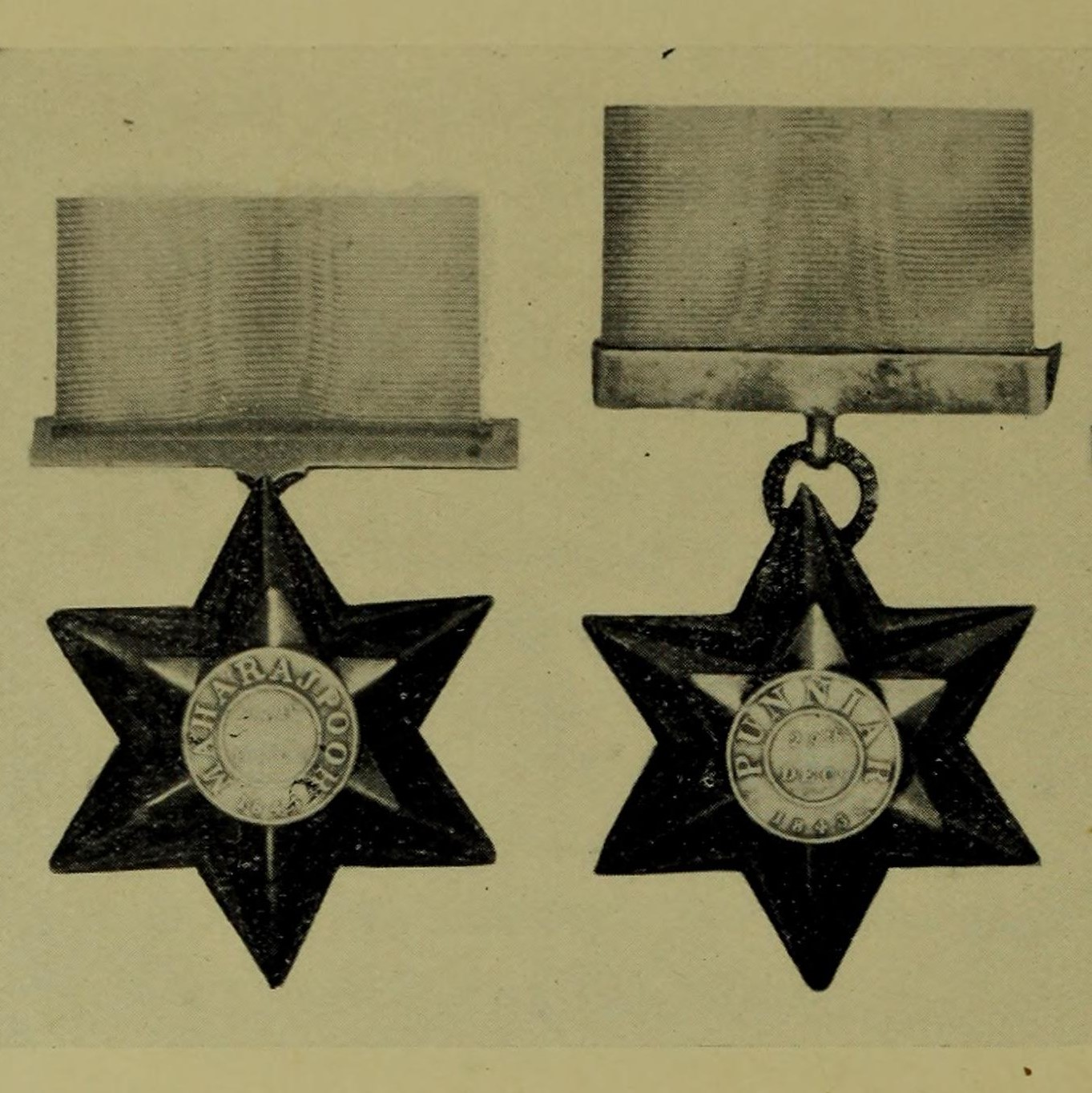
Maharajpore and Punniar Medals, 1843

After the defeat of the Scindia forces in Gwalior, the British disbanded their army and established a force in the state that the Government of Gwalior maintained. British influence over Gwalior increased significantly reducing the autonomy of the regency. A British governor was appointed at Gwalior Fort. The Gwalior Star was awarded to veterans of the campaign.
