= Kolaba =

Kolaba (also spelled Coloba) or Kulaba may refer to the following entities in Central India :

- the former Mahratta princely state Kolaba State
- Kolaba Fort, alias Kulaba Fort or Aliba(u)g Fort
- the former Kulaba District, now Raigad district, in Maharashtra
- the former Kolaba Lok Sabha constituency (Marathi: कुलाबा लोकसभा मतदारसंघ)
