= Bhaiyya Ganpatrao =

Indian Classical Singer

- Born: 1852
- Origin: Gwalior
- Died: 1920 (aged 67–68)
- Genres: Hindustani classical music, Thumri, Dhrupad, Khayal
- Occupations: Harmonium player, Singer

Bhaiyya Ganpatra, alias "Sughar-piya", (1852–1920) was a member of the Gwalior royal family and known for pioneering the harmonium as an accompanying instrument. He was a member of the Gwalior gharana school of classical music.

== Background ==
Bhaiyya Ganpatrao was born to Jayajirao Scindia of the Gwalior princely family. He was the brother of Jiwajirao Scindia.

=== Music training ===
He studied with Sadiq Ali Khan of Kirana Gharana and later with Bande Ali Khan and Inayat Hussain Khan, both students of Haddu Khan of Gwalior Gharana.

== Legacy ==
In the late-19th Century and early-20th Century, Ganpatrao was the "greatest name" associated with the harmonium. He popularized the instrument and developed its Thumri-ang.

Like Govindrao Tembe, Ganpatrao is credited with establishing harmonium as an instrument for Hindustani Classical music. Consequently, he had an enormous impact on many musicians whom he taught.

=== Compositions ===
Ganpatrao was a prolific composer and used the mudra "Sughar-piya."

=== Influence ===
Faiyaz Khan began singing thumris publicly because of Ganptrao's influence. Bismillah Khan adopted some of Ganpatrao's techniques to his Shehnai-playing.

=== Students ===
The sarod maestro Hafiz Ali Khan, father of Amjad Ali Khan, learned dhrupad and thumri from Ganpatrao. He also taught Bashir Khan of Indore and Girija Shankar Chakrabarty.

He also taught Jaddanbai, the mother of Bollywood actress Nargis.
