= Chandroji Angre =

Indian politician

Sardar Chandrojirao Sambhajirao Angre
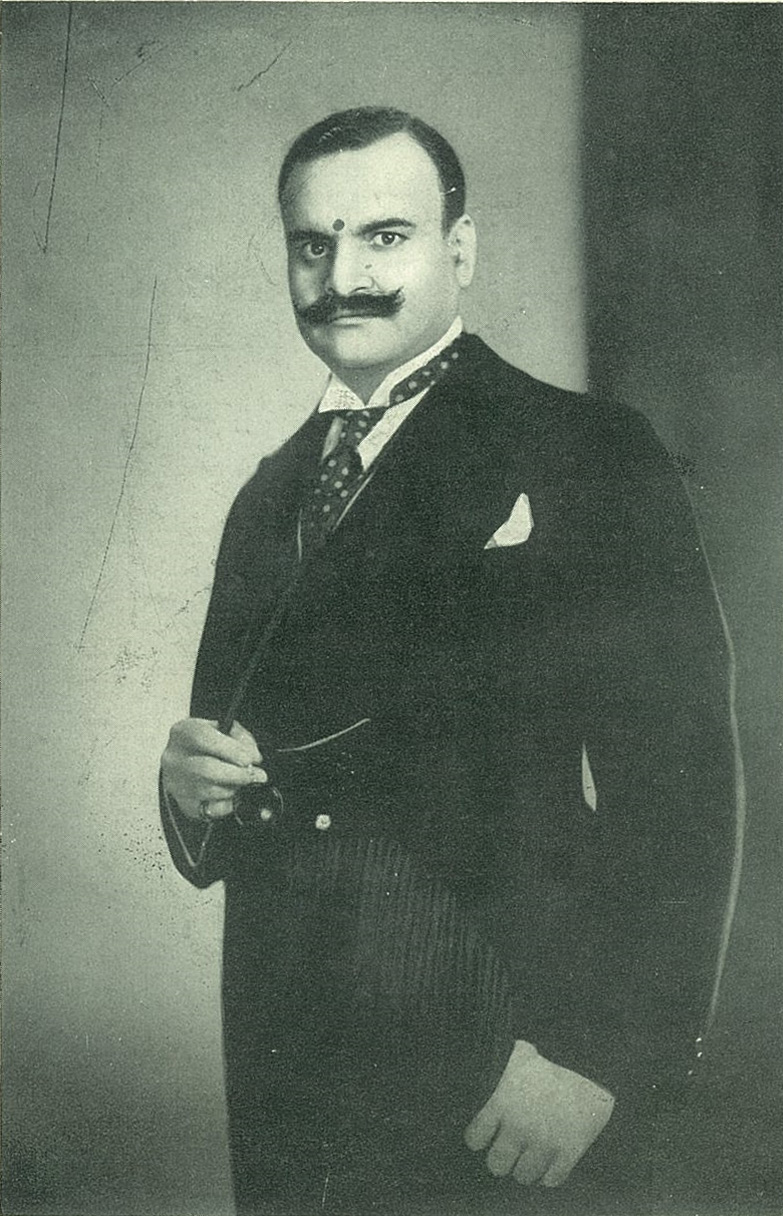
- Col. Shrimant Sardar Chandrojirao Sambhajirao Angre

Member of Rajya Sabha
- In office 3 April 1952 – 2 April 1954
- Constituency: Madhya Bharat

Personal details
- Born: Chandroji Angre
- Party: Hindu Mahasabha
- Children: 3 sons: Sardar Sambhaji Rao Angre, Shivaji & Shahaji; and 1 daughter: Premlatika
- Parents: Sambhajirao Angre II (father); Ramabai Angre (mother)
- Occupation: Politician

Sardar Chandroji Sambhaji Rao Angre was an Indian politician . He was a Member of Parliament, representing Madhya Bharat in the Rajya Sabha the upper house of India's Parliament as a member of the Hindu Mahasabha. He was a seventh-generation descendant of the famous Maratha admiral, Kanhoji Angre. He distinguished himself as the champion of Hinduism and was popularly called "Dharmvir". He was the Foreign and Political minister of Gwalior and was also vice-chairman of the Executive council of the Gwalior Kingdom, for the minority of raja Jivajirao Scindia. He succeeded his father Sambhajirao Angre as head of the Angre family in 1917.

== Political career ==
Chandroji Angre belonged to the Gwalior branch of the famed Angre family, who were hereditary commanders of the Maratha Navy. Chandroji was descended from Yesaji Angre, son of the famous admiral Kanhoji Angre. Chandroji's ancestors served in influential positions at the court of Gwalior kingdom. He himself was the private secretary and confidant of Vijaya Raje Scindia, the queen of Gwalior and a prominent politician. He succeeded his father Sambhajirao Angre II as head of the Angre family in 1917.

He was a principal jagirdar of Gwalior State, the Foreign and Political minister and was also the vice-chairman of the regency council for the minority of raja Jivajirao Scindia. Angre became extremely influential at the Gwalior Kingdom court, handling matters of state for the minor king Jivajirao Scindia. However, when Jivajirao Scindia came of age to assume the duties of state, he wasted no time in "throwing out" Angre, as Angre was a substantial threat to his power. Angre distinguished himself as the champion of Hinduism and was popularly called "Dharmvir". He had connections with the opposition political parties of Rashtriya Swayamsevak Sangh and Bharatiya Janata Party, at a time when the Indian National Congress was dominant.

In February 1982, Maneka Gandhi's mother Amteshwar Anand sold the "Surya India" magazine to Dr. Janendra Kumar Jain and Chandroji Angre for an unknown amount of money. The "Surya India" magazine had been used to promote the Indian National Congress by Maneka Gandhi during the Emergency of 1975, but after falling out with her mother-in-law Indira Gandhi, her mother Amteshwar Anand sold the magazine to Indira's strong opponent Chandroji Angre and Dr. Janendra Kumar Jain of the BJP.

== Personal life ==
In her biography, maharani Vijaya Raje Scindia of Gwalior kingdom wrote that Sardar Angre had a "larger than life-size presence". According to Vijaya Raje Scindia, he lived lavishly and entertained his guests well. Even though he was a feudal sardar, he frequented Bombay, where he owned expensive property. He was also well known in high British circles during the British Raj, and the Viceroy of India Lord Willingdon was one of his friends.
