= Karbhari =

Karbhari (roughly translated as "Principal Administrator") was the title of senior officials in some Indian Princely States - particularly the Maharashtra Gujarat Bhosle legacies Tanjore, Kolhapur and Satara.

A Karbhari could wield considerable power, often including the power to fix the seal or mark of their principals on public documents, and could act as regents in case of the principal being a minor or disabled.

Usage: 4% firstname, 96% surname. Karbhari first name was found 10 times in 3 different countries. Surname Karbhari is used at least 194 times in at least 9 countries.
