= Jayajirao Scindia =

Maharaja of Gwalior from 1843 to 1886

- Aalijah Bahadur; Rafi-us-Shaan; Wala-Shukoh; Maharaja; Scindia of Gwalior
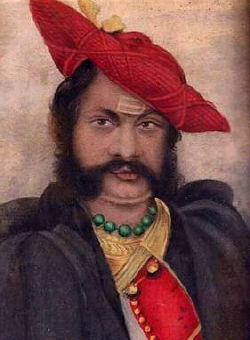
- Portrait of Jayajirao, c. 1875 as illustrated in London News

5th Maharaja of Gwalior
- Reign: 7 February 1843 – 20 June 1886
- Predecessor: Jankoji Rao Scindia II
- Successor: Madho Rao Scindia
- Born: 19 January 1834; Gwalior
- Died: 20 June 1886 (aged 52); Jai Vilas Palace, Lashkar, Gwalior
- Spouse: Maharani Chimnaraje (in 1843); Maharani Laxmibai Gujar (in 1852); Maharani Babuibai Raje (in 1873); Maharani Sakhyaraje (in ?)
- Issue: five sons and four daughters
- House: Scindia
- Father: Hanuvant Rao Scindia

Jayajirao Scindia GCB, GCSI, CIE (19 January 1834 – 20 June 1886) of the Scindia dynasty of Maratha Confederacy was the last independent ruling Maharaja of Gwalior State during the British rule from 1843 to 1886.

Scindia dynasty was the only dynasty that maintained semi-autonomous status during the British Raj. That means they can collect chauth (taxes) from their subordinate rulers (including Mughals) and were not required to pay it back to the Britishers except for certain grants.

During the reign of Jayajirao Scindia, the Scindia Dynasty along with the Holkars of Indore were the protectorates of the British East India Company.

== Early life ==
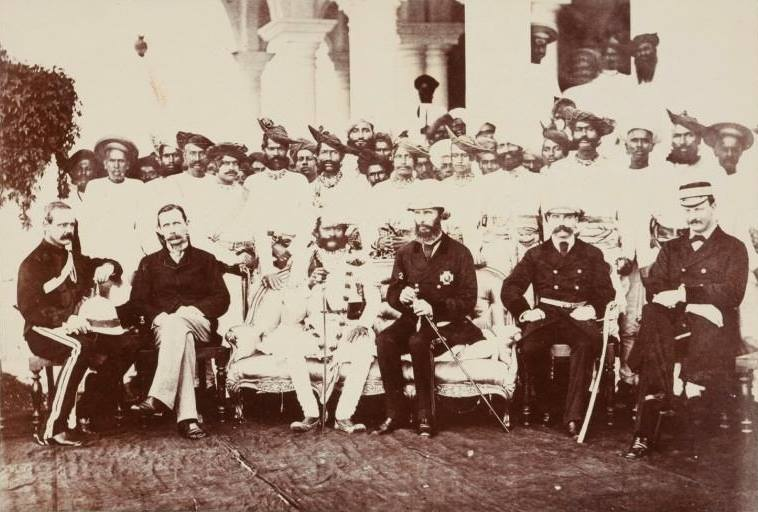
HH Maharaja Sir Jayaji Rao Scindia of Gwalior State, General Sir Henry Daly (Founder of The Daly College), with British officers and Maratha nobility (Sardars, Jagirdars & Mankaris) in Indore, Holkar State, c. 1879.

Jayajirao was born as Bhagirath Scindia, son of Hanuvant Rao Scindia, the younger brother of the then ruling Maharaja Jankojirao Scindia II on 19 January 1834. The erstwhile Maharaja of Gwalior, Jankojirao II, died in 1843 without leaving an heir leading his widow Tara Raje to adopt Bhagirath Rao. Bhagirath Scindia succeeded the Gwalior gaddi under the name of Jayajirao Sindhia on 22 February 1843 at the age of 9. Mama Sahib, the maternal uncle of Jankojirao II, was chosen as regent.

== Early reign and campaigns against the British ==
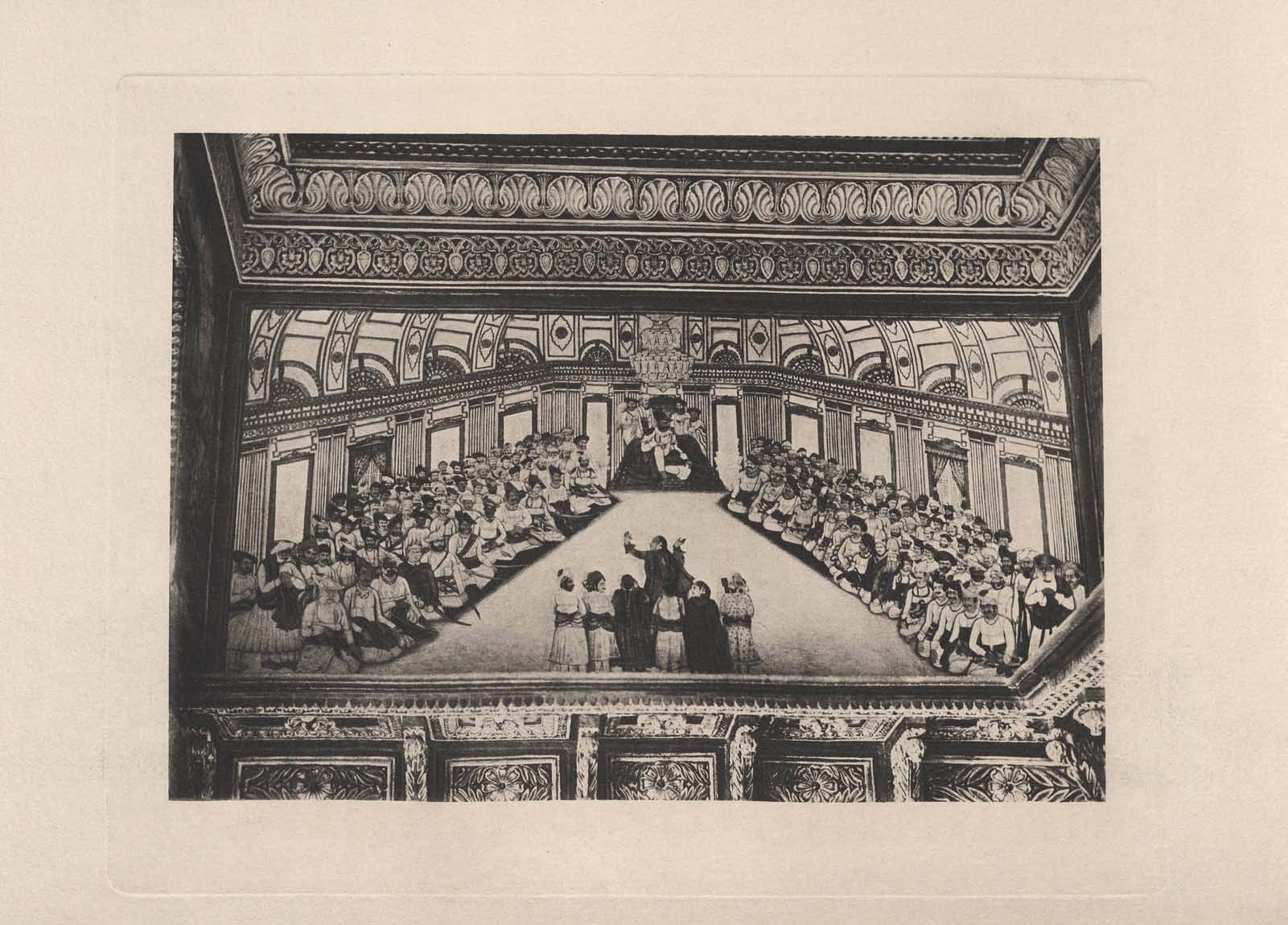
Durbar of Jayajirao Scindia, c. 1905

Dada Khasgiwale, the comptroller of the Scindia household overthrew Mama Sahib as the regent nearly leading to a civil war. The British East India Company decided to interfere by withdrawing their Resident Colonel Alexander Speirs and demanded the surrender of Dada Khasgiwale. A British force under Sir Hugh Gough started marching towards Gwalior, and crossed the Chambal in December 1843. On 29 December followed the simultaneous battles of Maharajpura and Panniar, in which the Gwalior army was annihilated. Khasgiwale was arrested by the British and was sent to Benares Jail where he died in 1845.

A treaty was then made, under which certain lands to the value of 1.8 million, including Chanderi District, were ceded for the upkeep of a contingent force, besides other lands for the liquidation of the expenses incurred in the war, the State army was reduced, and a Council of Regency was appointed during the minority, to act under the resident's advice.

British punished Scindia by not returning Gwalior fort to them after crushing war for Indian independence in 1857 and gave back the fort of Gwalior to Scindia only as late as 1886.

== Development work ==
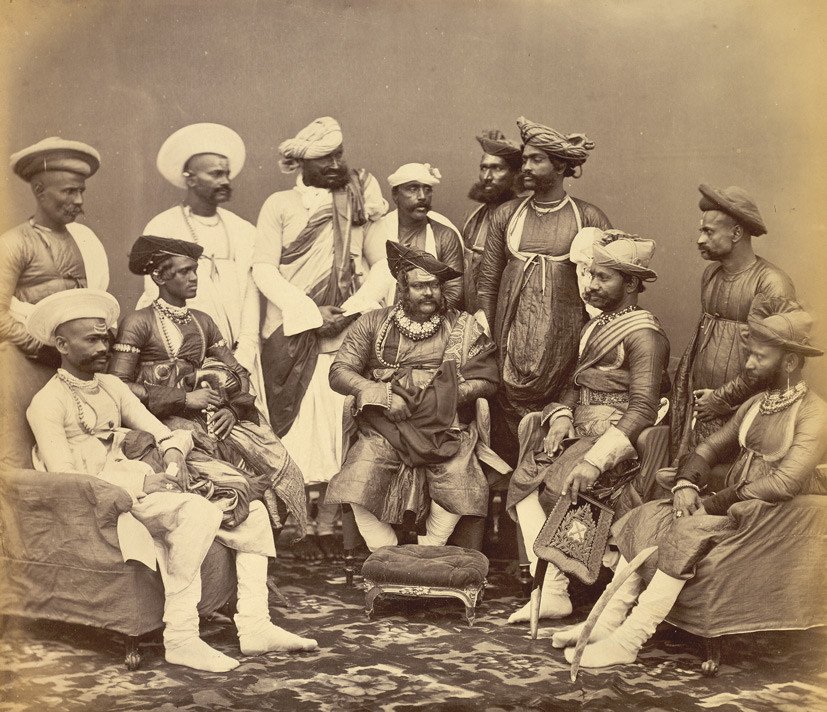
The Maharaja Scindhia of Gwalior with state officials

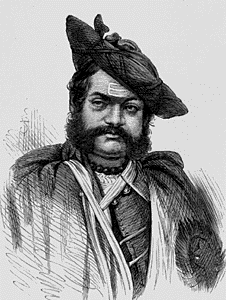
"The Maharajah Scindia of Gwalior" as seen in the Illustrated London News, c. 1875

In 1872, Jayajirao lent Rs. 7.5 million for the construction of the Agra-Gwalior portion of the Great Indian Peninsular Railway, and a similar amount in 1873 for the Indore-Neemuch section of the Rajputana-Malwa railway. In 1882 land was ceded by the state for the Midland section of the Great Indian Peninsular Railway.

Jayaajirao constructed many new buildings like Moti Mahal, Jai Vilas Palace, Kampoo Kothi, Victoria Hall, Gorkhi Dwar and Daffrine Sarai. He reconstructed the Koteshwar Mandir and constructed about 69 Shiva temples across his state. He gave Rs. 1.5 million for the reconstruction of Gwalior fort's boundary wall and the broken parts of Man Mandir, Gujari Mahal, and Johar Kund. In 1886 Gwalior fort and Morar cantonment, with some other villages, which had been held by British troops since 1858, were exchanged for Jhansi city.

== Honours ==
In 1861, Jayajirao was created a Knights Grand Commander of the Order of the Star of India. His photos appeared in the London press and was regarded as the friend of the British Empire. In 1877, he became a Counsellor of the Empress and later on a GCB and CIE.

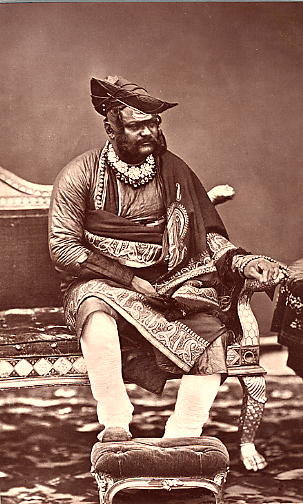
a photo by Talboys Wheeler from The Imperial Assemblage, 1877

== Family ==
Jayajirao married Chimnabai Kadam in 1843 and Laxmibai Gujar in 1852. Balwantrao Shinde was his eldest son from Laxmibai. Jayajirao married his third wife Babuibai Sawant in 1873 and fourth wife Sakhyabai. Jayajirao and Sakhyabai had a son, his fourth but only surviving son, named Madho Rao (b. 1876) who succeeded him as ruler of Gwalior. One of his sons was Shrimant Ganpat Rao, who died in 1920.

Ganpat Rao was a famous musician who trained Jaddanbai, mother of actress Nargis.

== Death ==
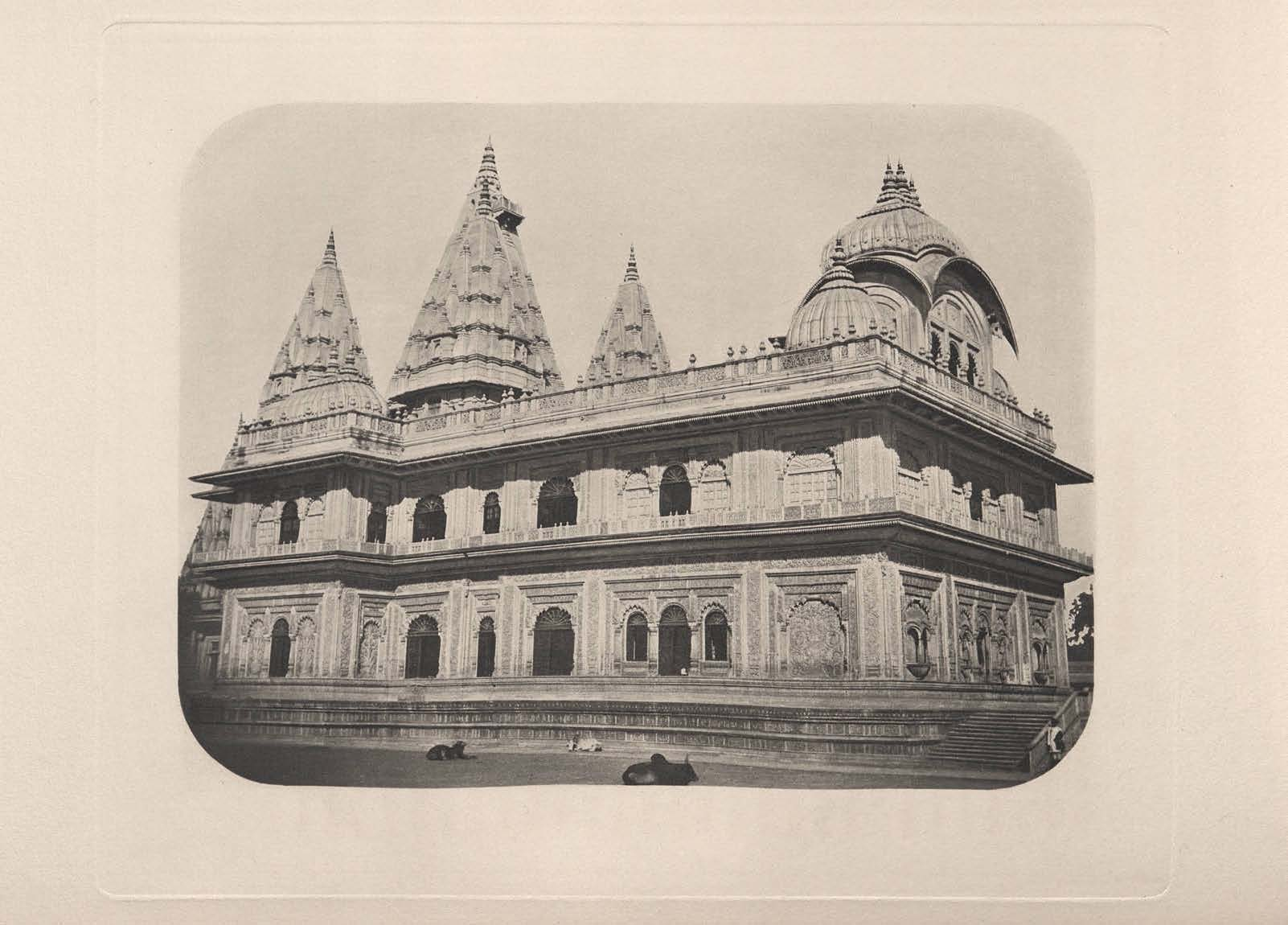
Tomb of Jayajirao Scindia

Jayajirao Scindia died on 20 June 1886 at Jai Vilas Palace, Gwalior.

== Full name and titles ==
His official full name was also General His Highness Ali Jah, Umdat ul-Umara, Hisam us-Sultanat, Mukhtar ul-Mulk, Azim ul-Iqtidar, Rafi-us-Shan, Wala Shikoh, Muhtasham-i-Dauran, Maharajadhiraj Maharaja Shrimant Sir Jayaji Rao Scindia Bahadur, Shrinath, Mansur-i-Zaman, Fidvi-i-Hazrat-i-Malika-i-Mua'zzama-i-Rafi-ud-Darja-i-Inglistan Maharaja Scindia of Gwalior', GCB, GCSI, CIE

- 1835–1843: Shrimant Kumar Bhagirath Rao Scindia
- 1843–1845: His Highness Ali Jah, Umdat ul-Umara, Hisam us-Sultanat, Mukhtar ul-Mulk, Maharajadhiraj Maharaja Shrimant Jayajirao Scindia Bahadur, Shrinath, Mansur-i-Zaman, Maharaja Scindia of Gwalior
- 1845–1861: His Highness Ali Jah, Umdat ul-Umara, Hisam us-Sultanat, Mukhtar ul-Mulk, Azim ul-Iqtidar, Rafi-us-Shan, Wala Shikoh, Muhtasham-i-Dauran, Maharajadhiraj Maharaja Shrimant Jayajirao Scindia Bahadur, Shrinath, Mansur-i-Zaman, Fidvi-i-Hazrat-i-Malika-i-Mua'zzama-i-Rafi-ud-Darja-i-Inglistan Maharaja Scindia of Gwalior
- 1861–1866: His Highness Ali Jah, Umdat ul-Umara, Hisam us-Sultanat, Mukhtar ul-Mulk, Azim ul-Iqtidar, Rafi-us-Shan, Wala Shikoh, Muhtasham-i-Dauran, Maharajadhiraj Maharaja Shrimant Sir Jayajirao Scindia Bahadur, Shrinath, Mansur-i-Zaman, Fidvi-i-Hazrat-i-Malika-i-Mua'zzama-i-Rafi-ud-Darja-i-Inglistan Maharaja Scindia of Gwalior, KSI
- 1866–1877: His Highness Ali Jah, Umdat ul-Umara, Hisam us-Sultanat, Mukhtar ul-Mulk, Azim ul-Iqtidar, Rafi-us-Shan, Wala Shikoh, Muhtasham-i-Dauran, Maharajadhiraj Maharaja Shrimant Sir Jayajirao Scindia Bahadur, Shrinath, Mansur-i-Zaman, Fidvi-i-Hazrat-i-Malika-i-Mua'zzama-i-Rafi-ud-Darja-i-Inglistan Maharaja Scindia of Gwalior, GCSI
- 1877–1878: General His Highness Ali Jah, Umdat ul-Umara, Hisam us-Sultanat, Mukhtar ul-Mulk, Azim ul-Iqtidar, Rafi-us-Shan, Wala Shikoh, Muhtasham-i-Dauran, Maharajadhiraj Maharaja Shrimant Sir Jayajirao Scindia Bahadur, Shrinath, Mansur-i-Zaman, Fidvi-i-Hazrat-i-Malika-i-Mua'zzama-i-Rafi-ud-Darja-i-Inglistan Maharaja Scindia of Gwalior, GCB, GCSI
- 1878–1886: General His Highness Ali Jah, Umdat ul-Umara, Hisam us-Sultanat, Mukhtar ul-Mulk, Azim ul-Iqtidar, Rafi-us-Shan, Wala Shikoh, Muhtasham-i-Dauran, Maharajadhiraj Maharaja Shrimant Sir Jayajirao Scindia Bahadur, Shrinath, Mansur-i-Zaman, Fidvi-i-Hazrat-i-Malika-i-Mua'zzama-i-Rafi-ud-Darja-i-Inglistan Maharaja Scindia of Gwalior, GCB, GCSI, CIE

Jayajirao Scindia Scindia Dynasty Born: 19 January 1835 Died: 20 June 1886
Regnal titles
Preceded by Jankoji Rao Scindia II	Maharaja of Gwalior; 1843–1886	Succeeded by Madhavrao II
