= Jankoji Rao Scindia II =

Maharaja of Gwalior from 1827 to 1843

- Maharajah of Gwalior

4th Maharaja Scindia of Gwalior
- Reign: 21 March 1827 – 7 February 1843
- Predecessor: Daulat Rao Sindhia
- Successor: Jayajirao Scindia
- Born: 1805; Gwalior, Gwalior State, Maratha Empire
- Died: 7 February 1843 (aged 38); Gwalior, Gwalior State
- Spouse: Bejabai Raje Sahib Scindia Sarabai Raje Sahib Scindia Tarabai Raje Sahib Scindia (Regent for her son)
- Father: Patloji Rao Scindia
- Religion: Hinduism

Jankoji Rao Scindia II (1805 – 7 February 1843), was Maharaja of Gwalior from 1827 to 1843.

== Life ==
Jankoji Rao was born in 1805 as Mugat Rao Scindia, son of Patloji Rao Scindia, by his wife, the sister of Ihtiram-ud-Daula, Imarat Mahal, Sardar Krishnaji Rao Kadam (Mama Sahib), Muzaffar Jang Bahadur at that time was the Regent of Gwalior.

Daulat Rao Scindia died in Lashkar, Gwalior, on 21 March 1827, without an heir (his only son Madhorao Scindia died when 8 months old, in Gwalior in 1812). On his death bed, he left the state and succession in the hands of the British Government, noting his desire that his widow Baiza Bai was to be treated with respect. Baiza Bai was the queen of Gwalior from 21 March 1827 to 17 June 1827. Jankoji was adopted by Baiza Bai, and ascended the throne on 18 June 1827.

Jankoji reigned under the regency of Baiza Bai until he came of age and was invested with full ruling powers in December 1832. Jankoji died at Lashkar, Gwalior on 7 February 1843.

Jankoji Rao Scindia II Scindia Dynasty Born: 1805 Died: 1843
Regnal titles
Preceded by Daulat Rao Scindia	Maharaja of Gwalior; 1827–1843	Succeeded by Jayaji Rao Scindia
