= Kolaba Fort =

Building in India

Kolaba
- Raigad District, Maharashtra
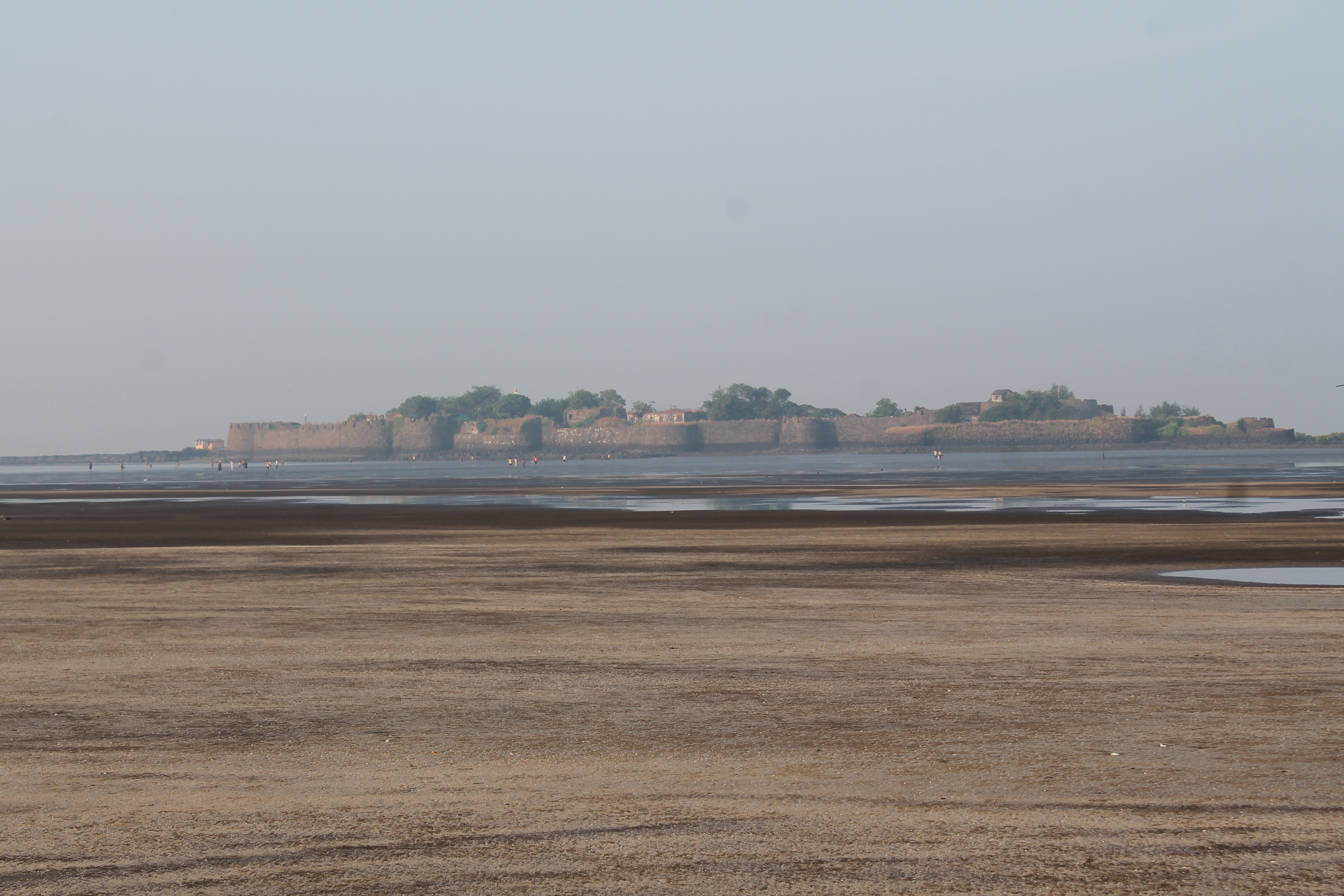
- Kolaba fort from Alibag

Site information
- Controlled by: Indian Govt.
- Open to the public: Yes
- Condition: Fairly good

Location
- Shown within Maharashtra
- Location within Maharashtra
- Coordinates: 18.6344°N 72.8642°E
- Height: sea level

Site history
- Materials: stone

Garrison information
- Occupants: Nil

Kolaba Fort located at Alibag beach is an old fortified maritime base in Alibag. It is situated in the sea at a distance of 1–2 km from the shores of Alibag, 35 km south of Mumbai, in the Konkan region of Maharashtra, India. It is a popular tourist destination and a protected monument.

== History ==
The first mention of Kulaba fort is when it was chosen by Chhatrapati Shivaji Maharaj to be fortified after the whole of South Konkan became free. The work of constructing the fort started on 19 March 1680. In 1662, he strengthened and fortified Kolaba fort to make it one of his chief naval stations. The command of the fort was given to Darya Sarang and Mainak Bhandari under whom Kolaba Fort became the centre of the Maratha attacks on British ships. Kolaba Fort was captured by Chatrapati Shivaji.

The fort was completed in June 1681 by Chhatrapati Sambhaji Raje after the death (in 1680) of Shivaji. In 1713, under a treaty with Peshwa Balaji Vishwanath, Kolaba along with several other forts was given over to Sarkhel Kanhoji Angre. He used it as his main base from which to launch raids on British ships. On 17 November 1721, the British, incensed at Angre's activities, joined the Portuguese in an expedition against Kolaba. A Portuguese land force of 6000 and three English ships of the line under Commodore Mathews co-operated but the attempt failed. The British blamed the failure on the "cowardice of the Portuguese". About this time Kolaba is described by Hamilton as a fort built on a rock, a little way from the mainland and at high water an island. On 4 July 1729, Kanhoji Angre died on the Kolaba Fort. In 1729, many buildings were destroyed due to a major fire incident near the Pinjara Bastion. In 1787, another major fire incident took place in which the Angre Wada was destroyed. In 1842, the British sold the wooden structures in the fort by auction and used the stones for the construction of Alibag water works.

== Etymology ==
The exact origin of the name Kolaba is unclear, but has been suggested to be derived from kolvan or kolbhat, meaning a Koli hamlet, and also from kalabeh, which means a neck of land jutting out into the sea.

== Major features ==
The average height of the fort walls is 25 feet. It has two main entrances, one on the seaside and the other towards Alibag. An interesting feature of this fort is that it has freshwater wells in its premises even though it is a seaside fort. In the monsoons, the fort can be reached by wading through waist-deep water at low tide. However, at high tide, boats must be used to reach it. In the fort are temples and houses in which several caretakers stay. The fort should be visited during the low sea tide season. There is a Dargah of Haji Kamaluddin Shah on the fort. Near the northern wall lie two English cannons mounted on wheels with the inscription "Dawson Hardy Field, Low Moor Ironworks, Yorkshire, England". The Siddhivinayak temple inside the fort was built by Raghoji Angre in 1759.

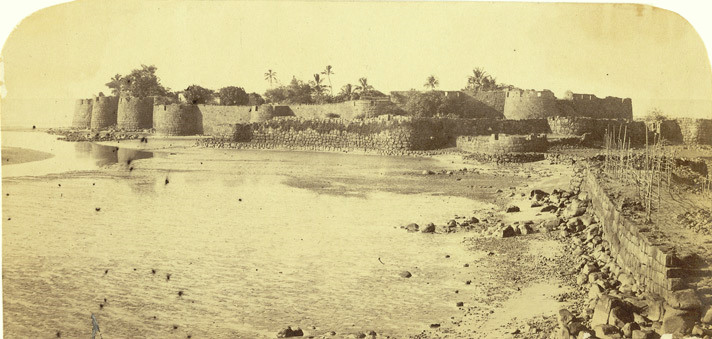
Colaba or Kolaba Fort, 1855.

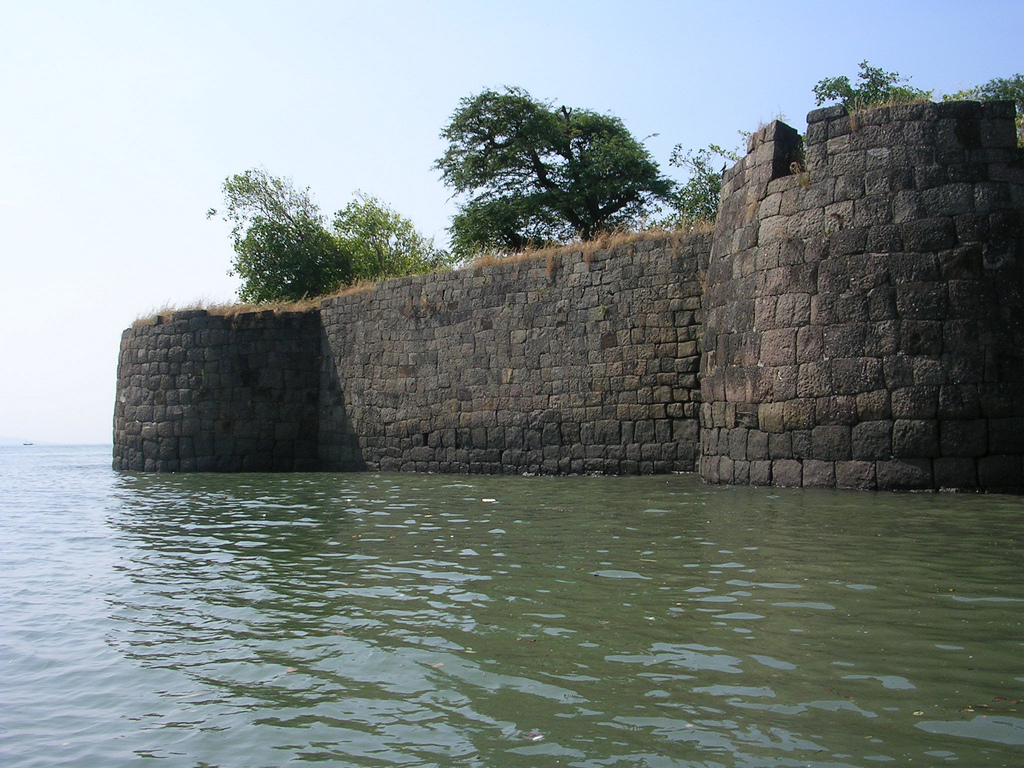
Kolaba Fort walls hugging the sea

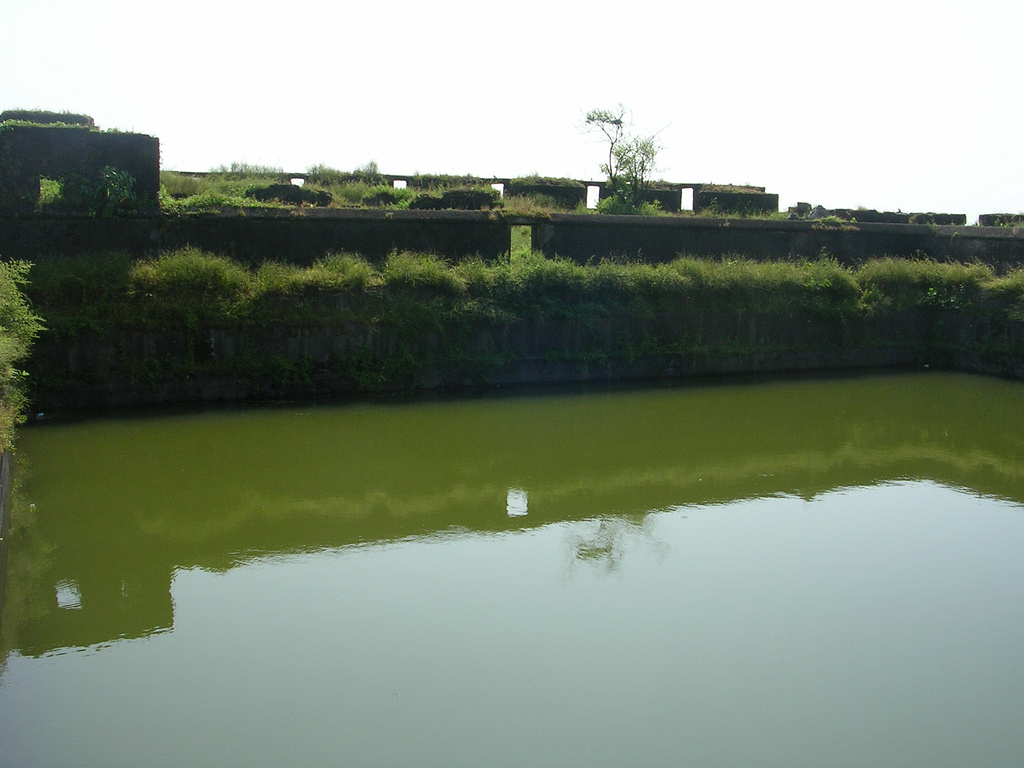
Water tank at the centre of Kolaba Fort

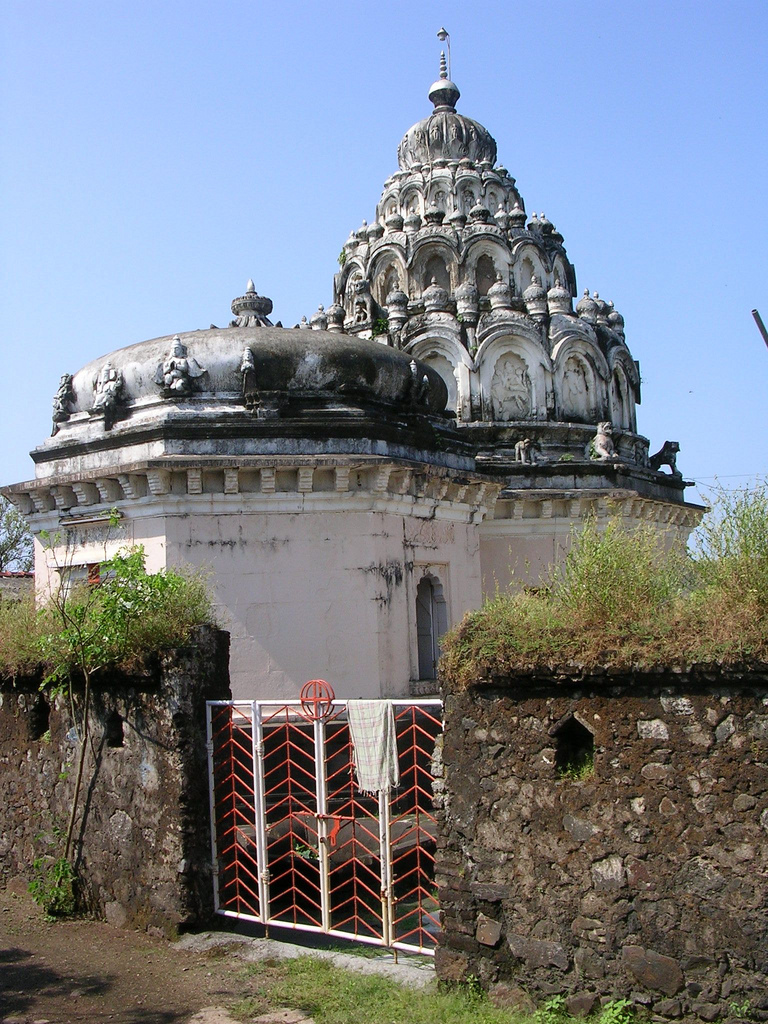
Siddhivinayak temple in Kolaba Fort

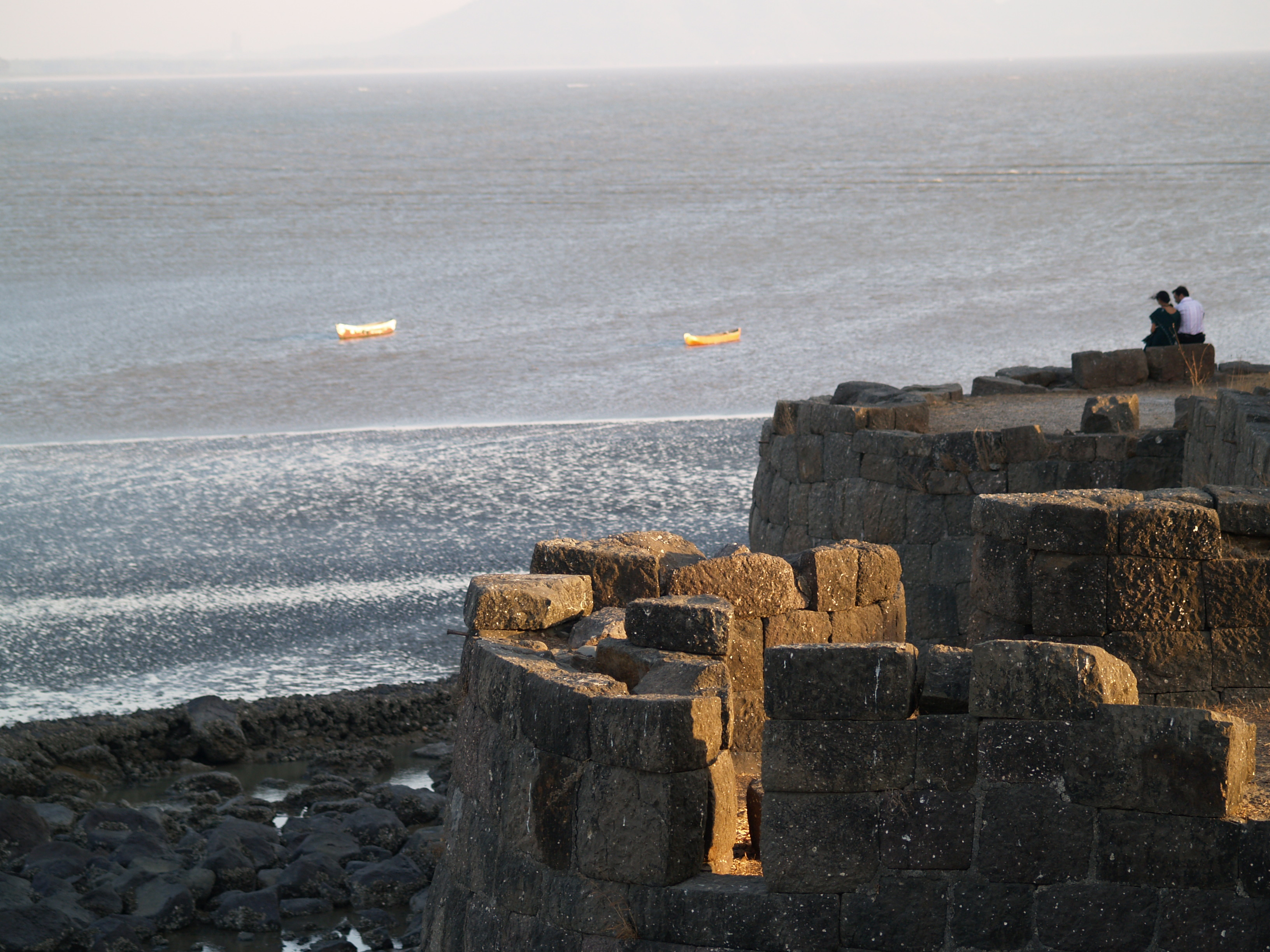
Looking out to sea

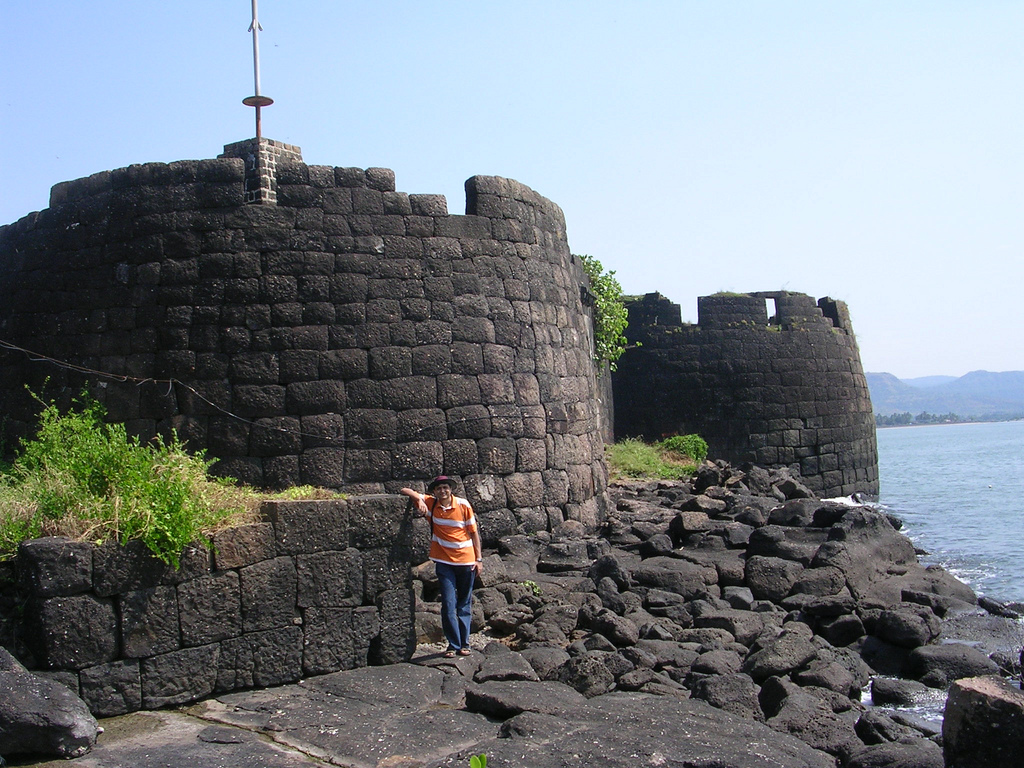
Kolaba Fort entrance

== See also ==
- List of forts in Maharashtra
- List of forts in India
- List of Maratha dynasties and states
- Maratha War of Independence
- Battles involving the Maratha Empire
- Maratha Army
- Military history of India
- Kanhoji Angre
