= Sambhaji Angre =

Indian politician

Sardar Sambhaji Chandroji Rao Angre

Member of Rajya Sabha
- In office 3 April 1970 – 2 April 1976
- Constituency: Madhya Pradesh

Personal details
- Born: Sambhaji Angre; 25 March 1920 Gwalior, Madhya Pradesh
- Died: 15 March 2008 (aged 87) Gwalior, Madhya Pradesh
- Party: Bharatiya Janata Party (1980–2008)
- Other political affiliations: Bharatiya Jan Sangh
- Spouse: Raj Rajeshwari Devi
- Children: 1 sons and 1 daughter
- Parent: Sardar Chandroji Angre (father)

Sardar Sambhaji Chandroji Rao Angre (1920–2008) was an Indian politician . He was a Member of Parliament, representing Madhya Pradesh in the Rajya Sabha the upper house of India's Parliament as a member of the Bharatiya Jana Sangh. He was close aide of Rajmata Vijayaraje Scindia.
