= Masure =

Village in Maharashtra

Masure Masura
- village
- Location in Maharashtra, India Masure (India)
- Coordinates: 16°10′23″N 73°30′14″E
- Country: India
- State: Maharashtra
- District: Sindhudurg

Population
  - Total: Around 9k

Languages
  - Official: Marathi
- Time zone: UTC+5:30 (IST)
- PIN: 416608
- Telephone code: ISD 091- 02365, India 9523965
- Vehicle registration: MH-07
- Nearest city: Malvan
- Avg. summer temperature: 38 °C (100 °F)
- Avg. winter temperature: 18 °C (64 °F)

Masure is a village located in Malvan taluka of Sindhudurg district, southernmost district of Maharashtra, India, across coastal line. It is around 480 km from Mumbai.

Nearest railway station is Kankavli 30 km and Kudal 35 km.

== History ==
Masure village has a history which dates back in 11th century. The old name of Masure during the Kadamba period was "Mahasurya" and it was a significant town known for various trade activities. Inamdar Mulik Prabhugaonkar representing Chattrapati Shivaji Maharaj have their palatial house in Bharatgad fort.Bharatgad fort was built to store heavy artillery. During the Adilshah period it was named Kasba Masure. Dargahs of Muslim peers are situated in masure. Most famous are of Sayyed Ahmad Qadari Sajjad ul Bagdadi, Lal Shah Wali. Dargah of Sayyed Mustafa Qadari Sajjad ul Bagdadi is situated in Juva. Jama Masjid is situated at walking distance from the Dargah of Sayyed Ahmad Qadari.

== Geography ==
Masure also has a fort situated at eastern side . This fort is called BHARATGAD FORT. This fort is estimated to be 400 years old, which is now undergoing renovation. It is said that the fort was constructed during the time of Shivaji Maharaj. However, as time passed the fort went under the darkness of history.

Masure has plenty of small localities each locality is called a Wadi. One such famous place is Anganechi Wadi, the place where Bharadi Devi's temple is situated. Other wadis include Dangmode wadi, Magavanewadi, Gadgherawadi, Medawadi, mardewadi, etc. At Deoolwada, as the name suggests, you could visit temples of Maoolidevi, Bharateshwar, Dattatreya, Vetal, Ravalnath etc. The temple of goddess Pawnai is located nearby Masure bus stand. The temple of Ravalnath located in Dangmode wadi.

The village is well connected with Maharashtra State Transport buses to nearby villages and Taluka places and is equidistant from Taluka heads like Kankavli, Malvan and Kudal. Surrounding villages are Achra, Bagayat, Bandivade and Kandalgaon.

== Economy ==
Masure flourishes with agriculture and horticulture. Kava and Gad are the rivers which make Masure very fertile. Kava and Juva are twin places situated on the banks of the Kava river. Another place to visit is Bhagavant gad, a fort, which was built in reign of Shivaji.

The local language of communication is Malvani.

The famous Anganewadi Jatra (Fair) held annually on the premises of the Bharadi Devi temple at Aangnechi wadi, is one of the wadis of Masure.The fair is popular across the whole of Maharashtra. Similarly grand celebrations are held during Dussehra & Ram Navmi festivals.

== Tourism ==
Temples of Masure village

- Gram Daivat is Shree dev Jain Bharateshwar situated at "Deoolwada"
- Gram devi is Shree Sateri devi situated at "Bilwas"
- Apart from these temples there are some other ancient temples having significant importance
  - Shree devi Bharadi, Mauli, Kamaradevi, Pavanai, Kalkai, Shree dev Vetal, Ravalnath, Gango, Aakari Brahman.

Dussera is celebrated in a traditional way representing these temples.

- Other famous temples are:
  - Dandekar temple, Katekumari temple, Sai baba temple, Ganapati temple - all temples are initiated by Mr. Madhukar (Baburao) Vasantrao Prabhugaonkar and some devotional people of masure.
- Swami samarth temple built in 2012 at Mardewadi Masure by (Om Sai Swami Samarth trust). Some of the devotional events organised by Swami Samarth trust are "Mhaprasad" on every Thursday and "Satya Narayan Mahapuja" once in every month.

Sufi Saint Dargah in Masure Village

- Sayyed Shah Shamshuddin Chisti has situated at Deulwada road
- Rafi Shah Wali dargah in Masure Market
- Chilla Mubarak of Sayyed Zinda Shah Madar and some other Sufi Saints dargah
- Sayed Ahmed Qadri in Sayyed Bada
- Lal Shah Wali Dargah
- Mustafa Qadri
- Rome Ki Dargah located in and around Masure
- Sindhudurg Maharashtra.

Holy Cross- Every year during Christmas Eve majority of Christian people visit to native village to celebrate festival and follow tradition set by their ancestors which is carried entire night on 25 December. Dance, Act is performed on Ghumaat .

== Famous People ==
- Avinash Masurekar - famous actor of Marathi theatre and films.
- Mukund Masurekar - famous surgeon and doctor (MBBS and FRCS) with practice in the United Kingdom, Mumbai and Kudal.
- Prathamesh Parab - famous actor of Marathi films.
- Jaywant M Parab - Senior Shivsena leader and former corporator from Mumbai and labour union leader.
