= Kurli =

Kurli may refer to:

- Kurli, Andhra Pradesh, a village in Anantapur district, Andhra Pradesh state, India
- Kurli, Karnataka, a village in Belgaum district, Karnataka state, India
- Kurli, Maharashtra, a village in Sindhudurg district, Maharashtra state, India
