= Banda, Maharashtra =

Banda
- village of Sawantwadi taluka
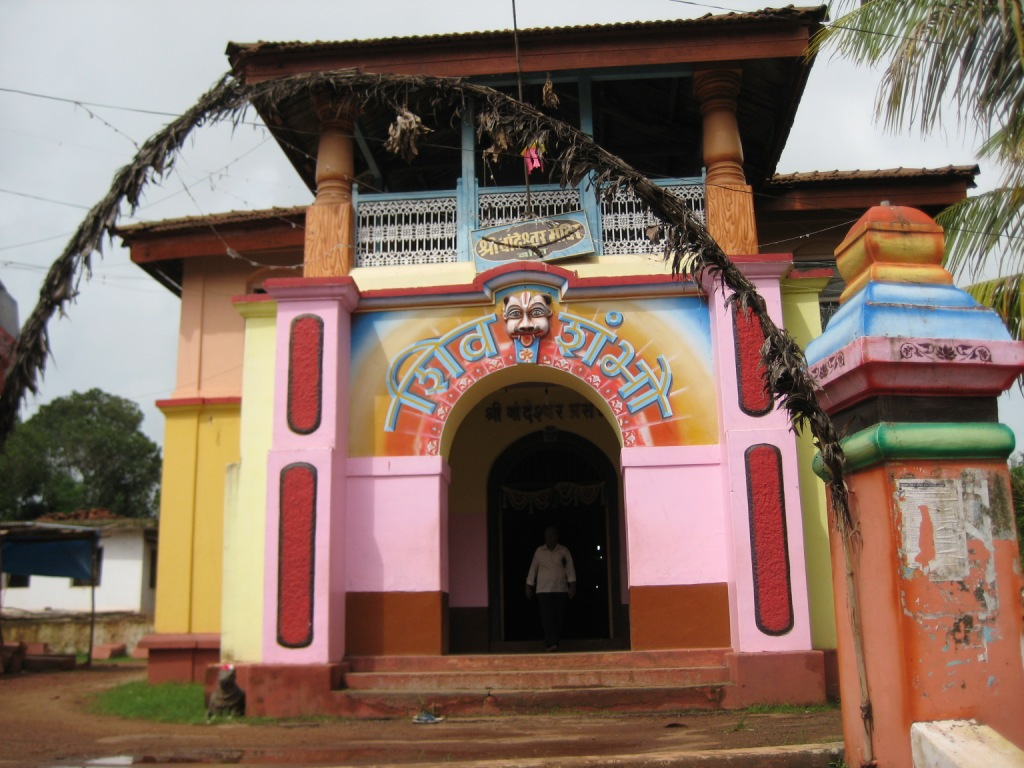
- Bandeshwar Temple in Banda

- Location in Maharashtra, India
- Coordinates: 15°48′45.85″N 73°51′40.78″E
- Country: India
- State: Maharashtra

Languages
  - Official: Marathi
- Time zone: UTC+5:30 (IST)
- PIN: 416511
- Telephone code: 02363
- ISO 3166 code: IN-MH
- Website: maharashtra.gov.in

Banda is a town in Sindhudurg district in Maharashtra, India, near the Goa-Maharashtra border. Banda is the last town in Maharashtra state on Mumbai-Goa national highway (NH-17), on the bank of the Terekhol river.

== Languages spoken ==
The main languages are Marathi, Malvani and Konkani. Many people have a knowledge of English and Portuguese.

== Places of attraction ==
God Shree Bandeshwar and Goddess Shree Bhumika are the main temples in the village, as well as temples of Lord Vitthal, Hanuman. Banda is named after the god Bandeshwar, a Jagrit Swayambhu Shivalinga. In ancient times, Banda was known as Adilabad in the reign of Adilshahi. Evidences of his reign can still be seen in the form of Redeghumat, Bailghumat and other ancient constructions in and around the town. Adil was defeated by the Portuguese. During the time of Shivaji I, the name Adilabad changed to Banda after the deity Lord Bandeshwar.

The more than 300 years old Temple of Lord Bandeshwar is being renovated. There are 12 Shivalingas inside the Garbhgriha of the temple.

There are temples for other deities such as Bhumika, Ravalnath, Vetal, Ganapati and Maharingan around the main Bandeshwar temple. Jatra is celebrated in December every year.

== Economy ==
Trade and agriculture are two main occupations of this town. Production and processing of cashew nuts, gamboge and betel nuts are emerging as major occupations. Because of huge production of cashews in the surrounding villages, Banda has become a major market for the whole Sindhudurga district.

== Transportation ==
The Terekhol river bridge was constructed in 1961 by the government of Maharashtra for transportation between Goa and Maharashtra state. The bridge was the only connecting bridge or link between Goa and Maharashtra until 1999. Mumbai-Goa national highway (NH-17) passes through Banda.

== See also ==
- Malvan
- Vengurla
- Savantwadi
- Kudal
- Kankavli
- Amboli
