= Rewandi =

Village in Maharashtra

- village
- Location in Maharashtra, India Rewandi (India)
- Coordinates: 16.09°N 73.47°E
- Country: India
- State: Maharashtra
- District: Sindhudurg district

Languages
  - Official: Marathi
- Time zone: UTC+5:30 (IST)
- PIN: 416606
- Nearest city: Malvan

Rewandi is a village in the Malvan taluka of Sindhudurg district in Maharashtra State, India. Revandi is other variation for the same name. Ozar is the other village along with Rewandi in Rewandi Panchayat.

== Main Attractions ==
- Bhadrakali temple attract the tourists to this village. Shri Bhadrakali is Resident deity of Revandi village.
- Ozar is a religious place near the village Revandi, which is 4 km from Malvan. It is a famous for a cave, which is known as Bhramhanand Swami Cave.

== Notable personalities ==
- Veteran Marathi theatre actor, director, and producer Macchindra Kambli was born in this village.
