= Verle, Maharashtra =

Village in Maharashtra

Verle
- Village
- Interactive map of Verle
- Country: India
- State: Maharashtra

Verle is a village in Sawantwadi Taluka in Sindhudurg District of Maharashtra State, India. It belongs to Konkan region and Konkan division. It is located 45 km towards South from District headquarters Oros, 28 km from Sawantwadi, 500 km from State capital Mumbai. It is surrounded by the dense Sahayadari mountains. The village is benith the famous Amboli waterfalls. Farming is the primary occupation while majority of the people are and have been working in the Indian Armed force. Paddy is the major crop. While most of the population has migrated to Urban cities for employment and education.

Verle Pin code is 416531 and postal head office is Kalambist.

Malvani a dialect of Marathi is the most common language; the Marathi language is also spoken by a few. The town's population are Hindu. Shree Pavnai (incarnation of Shakti) Rawalnath (incarnation of Lord Shiva), Navlai is the God of the village. Lord Vithhal i.e. Pandhuranga is also worshiped. Ganesh Chaturti and Holi and Dushera are some major festivals.

== Road connections ==
Sawantwadi is the nearest town to Verle. Sawantwadi is 28 km from Verle. A bus service runs between Sawantwadi and Verle.
