= Bhagwantgad =

Fort in Sindhudurg district, Maharashtra, India

Bhagwantgad Fort
- भगवंतगड किल्ला
- Part of Konkan coast Range
- Sindhudurg district, Maharashtra

Site information
- Type: Hill fort
- Owner: Government of India
- Controlled by: Maratha Empire (1739-1818); United Kingdom: East India Company (1818-1857); British Raj (1857-1947); India (1947-)
- Open to the public: Yes
- Condition: Ruins

Location
- Shown within Maharashtra Bhagwantgad Fort (India)
- Coordinates: 16°10′56.9″N 73°29′48.4″E
- Height: 100 Ft.

Site history
- Materials: Stone

Bhagwantgad Fort (Marathi: भगवंतगड किल्ला) is a fort located 18 km from Malvan, in Sindhudurg district, of Maharashtra. This fort is located on the northern bank of Gad river or Kalaval creek. The fort is spread over an area of 1.5 acres and covered with dense vegetation.

== History ==
This fort was built by Pant Pratinidhi to check the activities of Sawants of Sawantwadi. The Bavdekar had built this fort immediately after the Sawant's had built fort Bharatgad in the village Masure on the southern bank of Kalaval creek. This fort was under the control of Chhatrapati of Kolhapur. However, in few years this fort was brought under the control of Sawants of Sawantwadi. In 1748, Tulaji Angre, the son of Kanhoji Angre tried to capture the fort but, was unsuccessful due to strong resistance from the fort commandant for 18 months. On 29 March 1818, the 4th rifles of East India company under the leadership of Captain Gray and Pierson captured this fort. After the garrison noticed that the British troops had crossed the creek, they abandoned the fort.

== How to reach ==
The nearest town is Malvan which is 526 km from Mumbai. The base village of the fort is Masure. The Bharatgad and Bhadwantgad forts can be visited in a single day. There are good hotels at Malvan, now tea and snacks are also available in small hotels on the way to Masure. Small boats are available from the village Kavawadi or Kawamasure to cross the Kalaval creek.

== Places to see ==
The gates and bastion are in a ruined state. The only structure in good condition is Siddheshwar temple. It takes about an hour to visit all places on the fort.

== See also ==
- List of forts in Maharashtra
- List of forts in India
- Sawantwadi State
- Marathi People
- Maratha Navy
- List of Maratha dynasties and states
- Maratha War of Independence
- Battles involving the Maratha Empire
- Maratha Army
- Maratha titles
- Military history of India
