= Kurli, Maharashtra =

Village in Maharashtra

Kurli
- Village
- Interactive map of Kurli
- Coordinates: 16°26′17″N 73°49′34″E
- Country: India
- State: Maharashtra

Kurli is a village in Sindhudurg District, the south easternmost district of Konkan Division, Maharashtra, India. Kurli is located 7.9 km from its Taluk Main Town Vaibhavwadi. Kurli is 33.6 km from its District main city, Oras. It is 307 km from its State Main City Mumbai. This is a culturally and historically important village. Kurli consists of wadis like Temb Wadi, Khadakwadi, Bajarpeth. Also, it is famous because of the newly made Kurli dam.

== Nearby places ==
=== Villages ===
- Ghonasari (3.5 km)
- Arule (4.2 km)
- Vaibhavwadi (5.6 km)
- Navale (5.8 km)
- Achirne (6.9 km)
- Phondaghat (10; km)

=== Towns ===
- Vaibhavwadi (7.9 km)
- Kankavali (20.8 km)
- Oras (37.3 km)
- Deogad (46.7 km)

Villages in the same Vaibhavwadi Taluka as Kurli are: Vaibhavawadi, Achirne, Ainari, Akavanebhom, Gadmath, Het.

== Climate ==
The climate of Kurli is warm and moderately humid. Average temperatures range between 16 and 33 °C while relative humidity ranges from 60 to 80%. The annual average rainfall, measured at Malvan, is 2275 mm.

== Transport ==
=== Rail and air ===
The nearest railway stations are at Nandgaon/Kankavli/Vaibhavwadi on the Konkan Railway. The nearest airport is Dabolim Airport in Goa. Overnight trains from Mumbai to Kankavli run daily.

=== Road ===
Kurli is easily accessible by road and you can reach it by your own vehicle. By road, Malvan is 480 km away from Mumbai, 100 km from Kolhapur. When arriving from Mumbai or Goa, take National Highway NH-17 to Talere and then take a State Transport bus or rickshaw for an approximately 35 km ride to Phonda and take State Transport bus or rickshaw for Kurli.

==== From Phonda ====
State Transport buses from Phonda are frequent to Kurli.

==== From Pune (MSRTC) ====
Those who want to come from Pune, Best option is Maharashtra State Road Transport Corporation (MSRTC) bus from Pune - Malvan (via Kankavli). Bus Timings:

- 7:00 am (Express bus)
- 8:00 pm (Semi-luxury bus)

Note: There is no MSRTC Volvo (air-conditioned) bus from Pune to Malvan (via Kankavali)

==== From Pune (KTC) ====
You can also go for Kadamba Transport Corporation buses which daily depart from Pune to Goa. You can get down at Phonda/Vaibhavadi/Kankavli and from there catch Kurli buses. The timings are:

- Luxury (non-air-conditioned) 6:30pm (Pune - Madgaon)
- Volvo (air-conditioned) 7:30pm (Pune-Panaji)

==== From Pune via Kasal ====
Bus services operate between Goa from Pune which via Kasal. Passengers traveling from Pune, Sangali, or Bijapur can also transfer at Kolhapur which serves as a regional transit hub for routes entering the Konkan region and Goa via MSRTC and KSRTC bus lines.

== People and demographics ==
As of 2001 India census, Kurli had a population of 2,236. Males constitute 51% of the population and females 49%.

A number of Kurli emigrants return to their native place every year during the months of August, September and November to attend Ganeshotsav and 'Tipar Yatra'.

== Culture ==
Kurli has its unique culture signified by its peculiar dialect and food. Kurli is a Konkani dialect, sometimes referred to as a mix of Marathi and Konkani. This dialect is very popular among the local population in Sindhudurg district and also parts of Ratnagiri and Northern Goa.

A very important part of Kurli culture is a Kurli Tipar Jatrostsav, (Lotangan Festival). All devotees visit every year to Kurla Devi, for celebrating Kurladevi Tipar Jatrostav (simply called a Tipar).

Kurladevi (Marathi: कुर्लादेवी ) is a Swayambhu Goddess, self-manifested in the village called Kurli. Swayambhu means "And He manifests on His own".

== Education ==
There is a high school facility for the students till 10th Standard

== Wildlife Sanctuary ==
There is a Sahyadri Mountain (Paschim Ghat)

Birds like Rhinoceros hornbill can be seen.
