= Verle =

Verle may refer to:

- Verle, Maharashtra, village in India

== People with the surname ==
- João Verle (1929–2015), Brazilian economist and politician
- Giovan Battista Verle, 17th-century Italian instrument maker
