= Kubal (surname) =

Maratha Clan; Kubal
Surname	Kubal
Caste	96 Kuli Maratha clan
Lineage	Suryavansha (Solar Clan)
Heraldic Title:	#.
Religion:	Hinduism.
Original kingdom	Kedar (Kandahar in present-day Afghanistan).
Other kingdoms	Banavasi, Halasi, Gopapattan (Goa)
Clan god	Tulja Bhavani
Heraldic sign (Nishan)	Sun on flagpole
Gotra	Bharadwaj
Locations	Maharashtra, Goa, Karnataka
Languages	Marathi, Kannada, Sanskrit, Konkani

Kubal is an Indian surname. It is mainly found in Sindhudurg District of the Indian states of Maharashtra and Goa and the cities of Mumbai and the border district of Maharashtra and Karnataka including Belgaum and Karwar, Kubal are mainly from 96 Kuli Maratha clan caste and few are from Bhandari caste and Kharvi\Gabit caste.

The villages of Kubal are mostly in Vengurla and Malvan Taluka and a small village named Kholbaugwadi in Sawantwadi Taluka.
