= Sangeli =

Village in Maharashtra

- village
- Interactive map of Sangeli
- Country: India
- State: Maharashtra

Languages
  - Official: Marathi, Local language-Malvani
- Time zone: UTC+5:30 (IST)

Sangeli is a village in South Konkan Region in the Indian state of Maharashtra.

It is famous for its cool environment and Girijanath Temple. The yearly festival of Girijanath falls one day before holi which is a Hindu Festival. On the Girijanath Festival, one Jackfruit tree is cut and carved in a cylinder shape, which shoulder pole is carried by the people. When they reach Girijanath Temple they remove old pole to storage, and the new pole is placed.

Sageli village is connected by a bus route from Sawantwadi in Sindhudurg district, which has better transport connectivity from nearby city like Panjim, Mumbai or Pune.
