= Nivati fort =

16th-century fort in Maharashtra, India

Nivati Fort
- Part of Konkan coast Range
- Sindhudurg district, Maharashtra

Site information
- Type: Sea fort
- Owner: Private
- Controlled by: Maratha Empire (1739-1818); United Kingdom: East India Company (1818-1857); British Raj (1857-1947); India (1947-)
- Open to the public: Yes
- Condition: Good

Location
- Shown within Maharashtra Nivati Fort (India)
- Coordinates: 15°56′20.4″N 73°30′41.9″E
- Height: 300 Ft.

Site history
- Materials: Red laterite Stone

Nivati Fort is a fort located 10 km south of Malvan in Sindhudurg district, of Maharashtra. This fort is located on the hill near the Nivati village. The fort is spread over an area of 4-5 acres and covered with dense bushes.

== History ==
Shivaji Maharaj built this fort immediately after the Sindhudurg fort was built, in 1664. This fort was used to look over the Karli creek and the Vengurla port. This fort was later captured by Sawant of Sawantwadi. In 1748, Ismail Khan, who was working under the Portuguese, captured this fort. In 1787 Karvirkar of Kolhapur gained control of this fort. In 1803, the control of the fort passed to Sawants. The H.M. IV Rifles of British Army captured this fort on February 4, 1818 without any resistance.

== How to reach ==
The nearest town is Malvan which is 526 km from Mumbai. This fort is close to Nivati and Parule villages. There are direct buses from Malwan and Kudal to the Nivati Fort.

== Places to see ==
The gates and bastion are in good state. The entire fort is protected by 20 feet wide and 10 feet deep moat. It takes about an hour to visit all places on the fort. You will get to see a great and beautiful view of sea. You can see a Light House Called 'Nivati Rock' far away in mid sea.

== See also ==
- List of forts in Maharashtra
- List of forts in India
- Sawantwadi State
- Marathi People
- Maratha Navy
- List of Maratha dynasties and states
- Maratha War of Independence
- Battles involving the Maratha Empire
- Maratha Army
- Maratha titles
- Military history of India
