= Kunkeshwar =

Village in Maharashtra

- Village
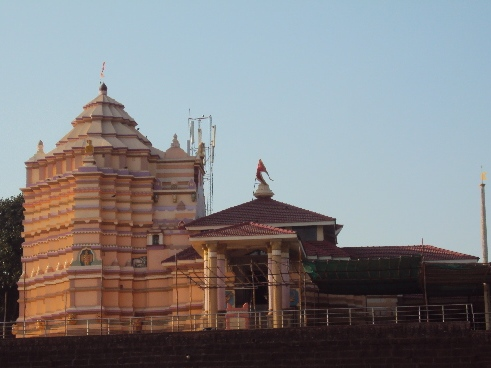
- Kunakeshwar temple
- Interactive map of Kunkeshwar
- Country: India
- State: Maharashtra

Kunkeshwar (ISO15919: Kuṇakēśvar) is a village in Maharashtra, India situated on the bank of Arabian Sea. There is a temple for the Hindu god Shiva in the village.

== Geography ==
Situated along the sea in the Sindhudurg district, Kunkeshwar is known for its shore-side Shiva temple and the adjacent beach. The region is known for its year-round supply of Alphonso mangoes. Kunkeshwar is 16 kilometers away from Devgarh(devgad), 54 kilometers from Malvan and 60 kilometers from Kankavli.

The nearest railway station is in Nandgaon which is approximately 42 kilometers away from Kunkeshwar, while Kankavli railway station is 60 kilometers away.

== Culture ==
=== Annual jatra/yatra of Kunkeshwar ===
Festival Of Mahashivaratri is celebrated in February each year and it is celebrated up to three days "amavsya (Amanta)".
