= Wargaon =

Village in Maharashtra

- Village
- Location within Maharashtra Location within India
- Coordinates: 16°30′36″N 73°38′12″E
- Country: India
- State: Maharashtra
- District: Sindhudurg
- Taluk: Kankavli

Wargaon is a village in the Kankavli taluka in Maharashtra, India. Wargaon is noted for the temple of Kalambadevi, which, as of September 2025, all renovation work is completed, and attracts many devotees and tourists. Wargaon is also emerging as a tourist, transit hub as it is being located on NH66 Mumbai Goa National highway. Popular tourist destinations like Sitai Resort, Napane Glass bridge waterfall etc are located near this village. Pin code of Wargaon is 416801.
