= Tarkarli =

Village in Maharashtra

- Village
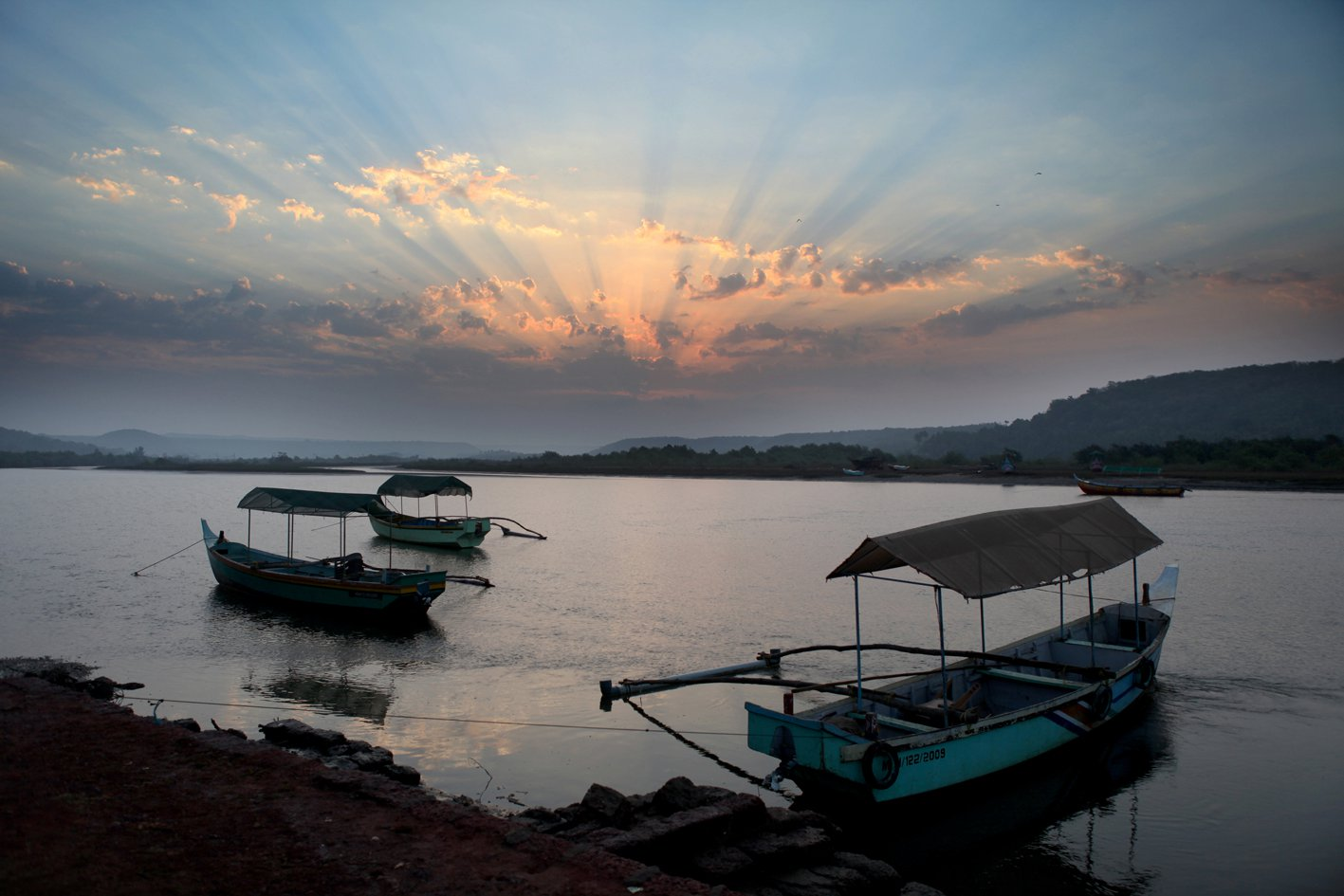

- Location in Maharashtra, India
- Coordinates: 16.056535°N 73.468752°E
- Country: India
- State: Maharashtra
- Named for: Karli River

Government
  - Type: Grampanchayat
  - Body: Tarkarli Grampanchayat

Languages
  - Official: Marathi
- Time zone: UTC+5:30 (IST)

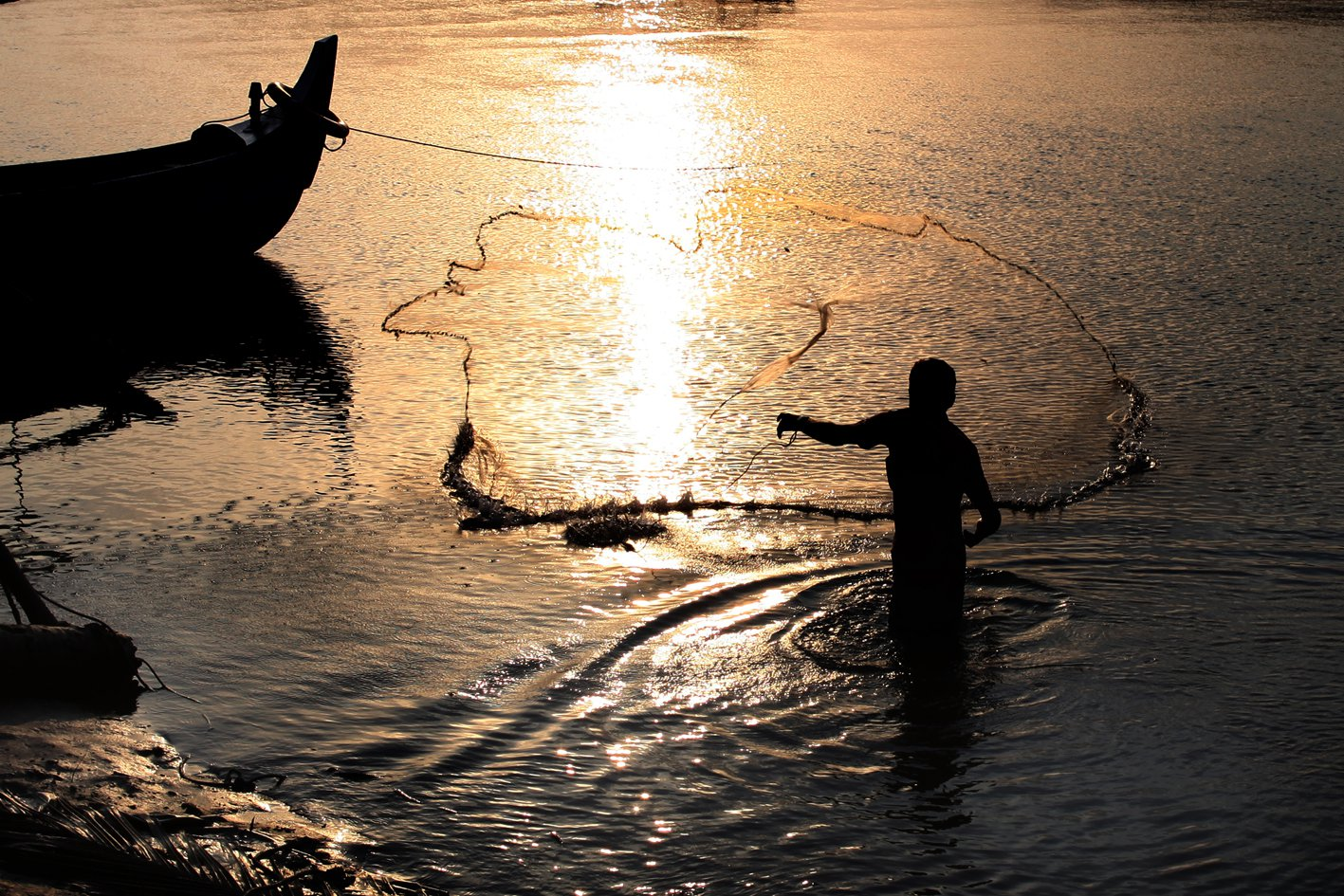
Tarkarli Backwater

Tarkarli is a village in Malvan taluka in Sindhudurg district in the Indian state of Maharashtra. It is a beach destination and remote place in southern Maharashtra. Tarkarli Beach was declared a Queen Beach of the Konkan region.

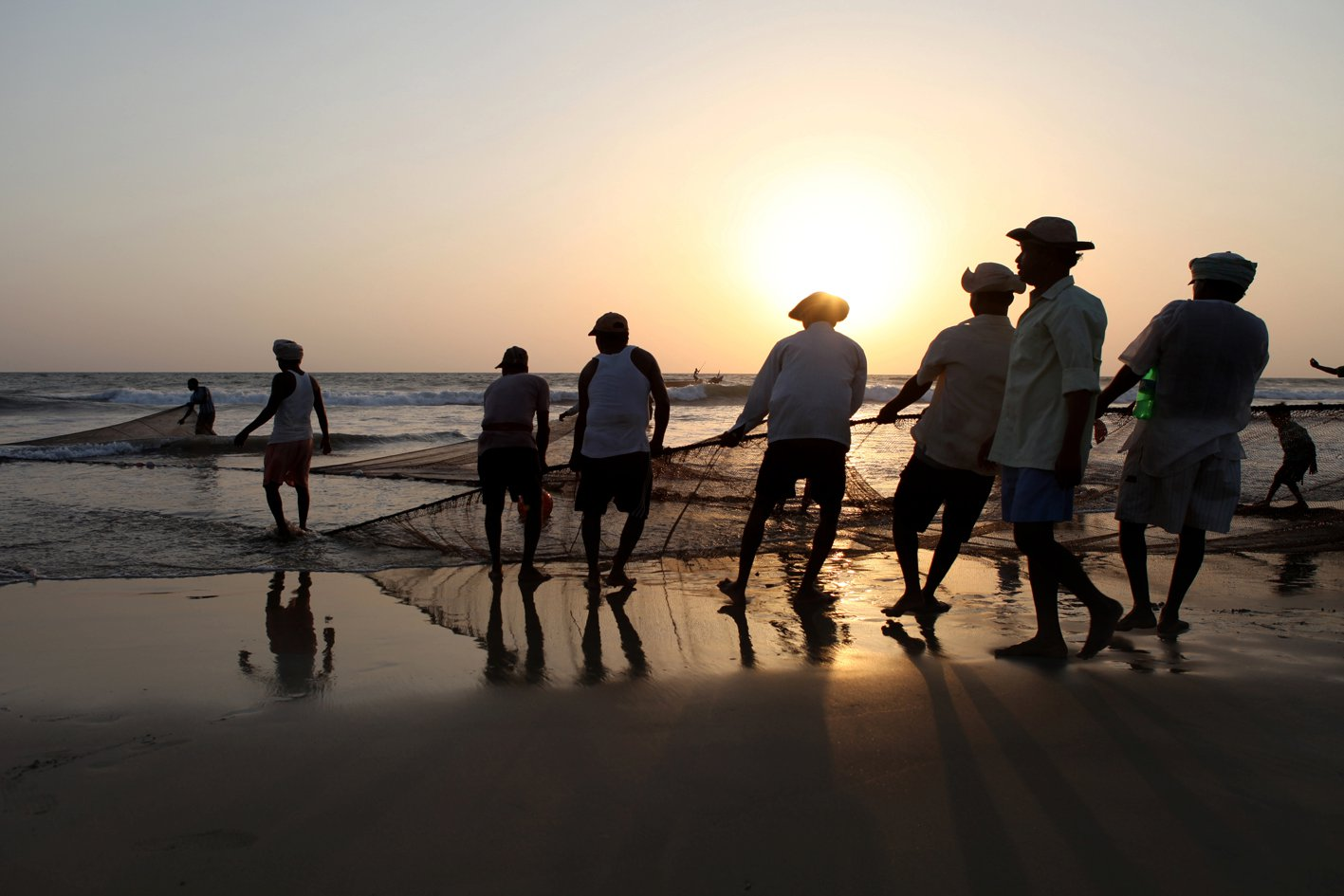
Raapan at Tarkarli

== Geography ==
Tarkarli is 8 km (5.0 mi) south of Malvan and 546 km (339 mi) from Mumbai and 410 km from Pune on the west coast of India, at the confluence of the Karli River and the Arabian Sea.

== Education ==
Tarkarli has the following educational establishments:

- International Scuba Diving Training Centre

== Travel ==
The nearest airport is Chipi Sindhudurg International Airport Dabolim Airport in Goa. By rail, Tarkarli can be accessed from Sindhudurg and also from Kudal and Kankavli by the Konkan Railway. Tarkarli is easily accessible by road from Malvan by bus and rickshaw. Tarkarli is 475 km (Panvel Kochi Road, NH 17) and 576 km (Mumbai Kohlapur Road NH 4) away from Mumbai. Daily private, luxury and State Transport bus services are available from various parts of Goa, Mumbai, Pune to Malvan.

Buses from/to Panaji: direct buses run from bus bay #2 at the KTC bus stand in Panaji to Malvan, take 4.5 hours and cost 125 rupees. However, Malvan lies off the national highway (NH-17) so direct buses are infrequent (they also take a longer route). The faster option is to break the journey in parts - Panaji to Sawantwadi (56 rupees; 1.5 hours), Sawantwadi to Kudal (the closest town to Malvan on NH-17; 19 rupees, 0.5 hours), and Kudal to Malvan (30 rupees, 1 hour 15 minutes) - the total time is thus reduced to 3 hour 15 minutes.

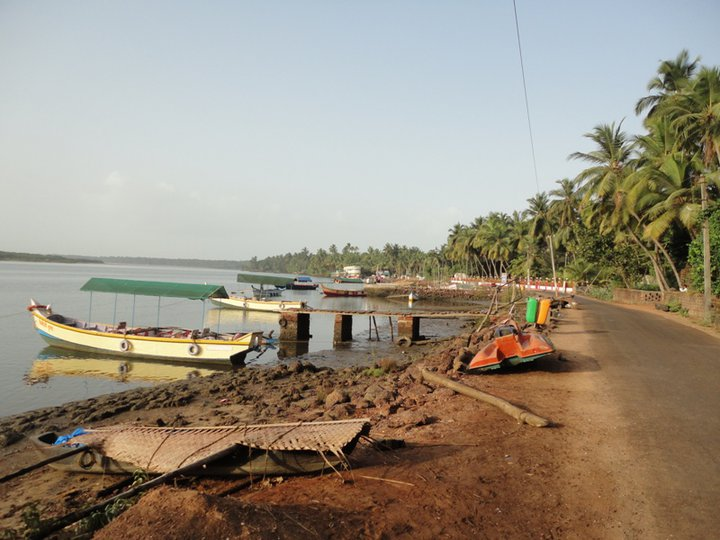
Tarkarli Road

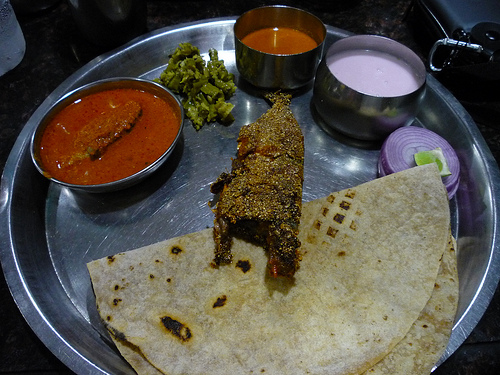
Food @ Tarkarkli

== See also ==
- Coral reefs in India
