= Macchindra Kambli =

Indian actor

- Born: 4 April 1947; Rewandi, Sindhudurg
- Died: 30 September 2007 (aged 60)
- Political party: Nationalist Congress Party
- Other political affiliations: Indian National Congress (1998)

Macchindra Kambli popularly known as Baablya (4 April 1947 – 30 September 2007) was a veteran Marathi theatre actor, director, and producer. Known for his humorous style, he brought Malvani dialect to the mainstream of Marathi theatre. He acted, directed and produced Malvani/ Marathi plays. He died on 30 September 2007 at the age of 60.

Vastraharan

== Early life ==
He was born in Rewandi village, Sindhudurg, Maharashtra. His father died when he was a child, and was raised by his mother.

== Career ==
He had established Bhadrakali Productions, a banner known for its ethnic Malvani comedies. His famous work includes:

- Vastraharan – A play within a play about a group of actors attempting to stage the Vastraharan episode from Mahabharata, took the Marathi theatre by storm and established him in the Marathi theatre industry.
- Pandgo Ilo re
- Ghas re rama
- Yeva Konkan Aplach Asa
- Maza Pati Chhatrapati
- Vai Varsha Panchavan

He had also acted in Marathi movie Painjan.

== Politics and career ==
He briefly dabbled into politics by unsuccessfully contesting the Lok Sabha elections for the Indian National Congress from Rajapur in 1998. He got 1,52,724 votes against Suresh Prabhu of Shiv Sena who won with 2,17,766 votes. He later was associated with the Nationalist Congress Party. He remained president of Marathi theatre artiste organization, Akhil Bharatiya Marathi Natya Parishad.
