= Kurli, Karnataka =

Kurli, Karnataka Kurli
- Village
- Location in Karnataka, India Kurli, Karnataka (India)
- Coordinates: 16.42°N 74.58°E
- Country: India
- State: Karnataka
- District: Belgaum
- Talukas: Nipani

Government
  - Type: Panchayat raj
  - Body: Gram panchayat

Population (2001)
  - Total: 5,399

Languages
  - Official: Marathi
- Time zone: UTC+5:30 (IST)
- Postal code: 591241
- ISO 3166 code: IN-KA
- Vehicle registration: KA23
- Website: karnataka.gov.in

Kurli is a village in Sindhudurg District, the south-easternmost district of Konkan Division, Maharashtra, India. Kurli is located 7.9 km from its Taluk Main Town Vaibhavwadi. Kurli is 33.6 km from its District main city, Oras. It is 307 km from its State Main City Mumbai. This is a culturally and historically important village. Kurli consists of wadis like Temb Wadi, Khadakwadi, Bajarpeth. Also it is famous because of the newly made Kurli Dam.

== Demographics ==
Kurli is a village located in the Chikodi taluk in the Belgaum district of Karnataka, India. According to the 2011 census, Kurli had a population of 6,069, of which 3,065 were male and 3,004 were female.

According to the 2011 census, Kurli has 686 children aged between 0-6, which make up 11.30% of the total population of the village.

Kurli village has a higher literacy rate compared to Karnataka. In 2011, the literacy rate of Kurli village was 78.23% compared to 75.36% of Karnataka. In Kurli Male literacy stands at 88.51% while the female literacy rate was 68.02%. The official language at Kurli is Kannada but the commercial language is Marathi, the mother tongue of most of the people.

As per the Constitution of India and the Panchyati Raaj Act, Kurli village is administrated by the Sarpanch (Head of Village) who is elected representative of the village. It is 14 km away from city Nippani and 86 km from Belgaum and 30 km from Kolhapur in Maharashtra. The village receives abundant water from the Vedganga River.

== See also ==
- Belgaum
- Districts of Karnataka
- Kolhapur
