= Aangnechi wadi =

Village in Maharashtra

Anganechi Wadi
- village
- Location in Maharashtra, India Anganechi Wadi (India)
- Coordinates: 16.142918°N 73.520207°E
- Country: India
- State: Maharashtra
- District: Sindhudurg

Languages
  - Official: Marathi
- Time zone: UTC+5:30 (IST)
- Vehicle registration: MH-07

Anganewadi is a village located in the Sindhudurg district of Malvan, Maharashtra, India.

== Overview ==
Alcohol consumption is forbidden in the hamlet.

=== Festival ===
At Bharadi Devi temple a fair is organised every February when two hundred thousand i.e. millions of people visit the temple during the fair.

This is the Jaagrut (Active) devasthan situated at Anganewadi, 12 km from Malvan. The Bharadi devi temple is in the village of Masure. Anganewadi is a small hamlet of Masure village. The Bharadi (Earth Goddess) devi is famous for her wish-fulfilling(Navas) power. Her devotees express their wishes (Navas) before her and once the wish is fulfilled they come again for a Darshan (visit) to express their gratitude.

The highlight of Anganewadi is an annual fair. [held some time in February/March, the date is declared after getting approval from the goddess herself].

Because of the belief that the Goddess has wish–fulfilling powers, many political leaders and celebrities are among her devotees.

Anganewadi is known as the Pandharpur of Konkan. The name Anganewadi indicates a dominance of people with the surname Angane. According to a legend a Goddess materialized in the village in the form of a stone plaque, 400 years ago. Since then people have been flocking to this village for 'Darshan', every year. There is no fixed day or date for the fair. It is decided by consensus.

A theory to explain the origin of the fair is that a man from the village of Anganewadi, was working as an Intelligence officer/spy for the Maratha Empire during the reign of Shahu Maharaj [son of Chhatrapati Sambhaji Maharaj] and the Peshwas (Baji Rao I & Chimaji Appa) and had single handed-ly helped them achieve tremendous success during their campaigns in North India, when the Marathas were expanding their empire & had planted the Maratha flag in Attock. When he came back after fulfilling his duty, one of his cows would discharge milk on the green wood which turned into a stone plaque (Swayambhu Idol). When the owner went out to look for the cow, he found the stone plaque. On the same night, he got a divine message in his dream from the Goddess, who believed is to be an incarnation of Sita Mata, the daughter of Bhoodevi[Mother Earth] & the Warrior Goddess Bhavani herself and the village started to worship the stone plaque. The word soon spread and people from all over Maharashtra & India have since visited the place annually. The Marathas and Peshwas, Baji Rao I & Chimaji Appa themselves had come to worship the Goddess for their future campaigns in India which proved successful & the Maratha Empire thus sanctioned 2000 acres land to the village.

The consensus for the day of the fair is achieved via a hunt for a wild animal, usually a Wild Boar. The men of Anganewadi go on a hunt and do not return before hunting the wild animal(Wild Boar). It is believed that this hunt provides food to all the good and evil spirits of Konkan & makes all the existing evil powers in Konkan inactive (shanti). This is not offered as a 'Prasad' to the Goddess. The animal's flesh is cooked and distributed among the villagers who then decide on a suitable day for fair. A decision is taken sitting on a mat (made up of peelings of bamboo) commonly known as 'Daali' in Malvani lingo. The villager's decision is known as 'Daalap'.

On the day of the fair, the stone plaque is adorned by mask, ornaments and apparels. The village's barber then stands outside the temple and after sunrise releases the reflected sunrays over the sacred plaque. In view of the enormous crowd attending the festivity, the rituals begin at 4am and ends at 10pm on the first day. One female member from each family joins in the mass cooking. A food thus prepared is offered as 'Prasad'. This event is known as 'Taate Lawane (To serve the dishes)’ in Malvani. All the visitors are welcome to eat at any household without any religious or caste barrier. The event marks the end of the first day of the fair.

On the next day, rituals again restart at 4am and continue till the afternoon. The day is called 'Mode Jatra (End of fair)’. Though the fair thus officially lasts one and a half days, entertainment programs like music, dramas, plays, kirtans, bhajans continue for the next four to five days.

Since the plaque was found in the rocky soil, (local lingo : Bharad) the Goddess came to be known as Bharadi (Goddess incarnate of Mother Earth). Over the years, the crowds have swelled (more than 10 Lakhs[One hundred thousand]) to the extent where the queue found by devotees for 'Darshan' extends up to several kilometres on the way.

Shops of sweets and restaurants are set up in Aangnewadi by local villagers over several kilometres during the fair on both the sides of the main road, along with a Ferris wheel and many other rides for children and adults alike.

== Location ==
10 km (6.2 mi) from Malvan city.

- Nearest Railway Station - Kankavali
- The new airport "Nearest airport : Chipi".
- Alternate Airport - Dabolim airport Goa.
- By road 10 km from KATTA

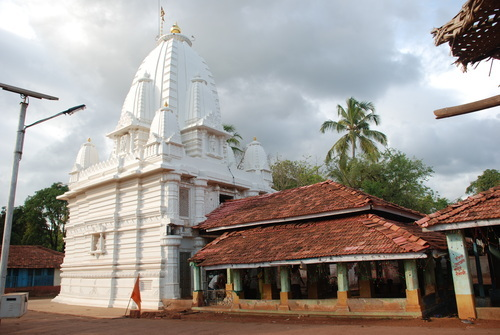
