= Shiroda =

Shiroda may refer to the following places in India:

- Shiroda, Goa, a village
- Shiroda (Maharashtra), a village
