= Government Medical College, Sindhudurg =

- Other names: Sindhudurg Medical College
- Type: Medical College and Hospital
- Established: 2021; 5 years ago
- Affiliations: Maharashtra University of Health Sciences
- Location: Oros, Sindhudurg district, Maharashtra, India
- Campus: Urban
- Website: https://gmcsindhudurg.org/

Government Medical College, Sindhudurg, established in 2021, is a full-fledged tertiary Government Medical college and hospital. It is located at Oros in Sindhudurg district, Maharashtra. The college imparts the degree of Bachelor of Medicine and Surgery (MBBS). The hospital associated with the college is one of the largest hospitals in the Sindhudurg district. Yearly undergraduate student intake is 100 from the year 2021.

== Courses ==
Government Medical College, Sindhudurg undertakes education and training of 100 students MBBS courses.

== Affiliated ==
The college is affiliated with Maharashtra University of Health Sciences and is recognized by the National Medical Commission.
