= Kumbhawade =

Village in Maharashtra

- village
- Interactive map of Kumbhawade
- Coordinates: 15°51′20″N 74°01′08″E
- Country: India
- State: Maharashtra
- District: Sindhudurg

Languages
  - Official: Marathi
- Time zone: UTC+5:30 (IST)

Kumbhawade is a small village in Sindhudurg district near Amboli hill resort in India. Kumbhawade is well-known for its mango, cashew and banana farms.

== Nearby villages ==
Nearby villages include Chaukul.

== People ==
The majority of the population is composed of ethnic Marathas and also includes Dalits.

=== Common Surnames ===
Surnames of the people include Gawade, Parab, Naik, Shetye, and Sawant.
