= Chaukul =

Village in Maharashtra

Coordinates: 15.928307°N 74.038810°E

- Village
- Interactive map of Chaukul
- Country: India
- State: Maharashtra

Chaukul Village is located near Sawantwadi taluka of Sindhudurg district, Maharashtra State in India.

The village belongs to Konkan Division. It is located 80 KM from District head quarter Oros. The total geographical area of village is 1590 hectares.

Chaukul receives excessive rain. Paddy and banana are the main crops cultivated here. Much of the farming takes place after the monsoons withdraw.
