= Kalambist =

Village in Maharashtra

- Location within Maharashtra
- Coordinates: 15.981213°N 73.928617°E
- Country: India
- State: Maharashtra
- district: Sindhudurg

Language
  - Official: Malvani
- Time zone: UTC+5:30 (IST)
- PIN: 416 531
- Telephone code: 02363
- Vehicle registration: MH-07

Kalmbist is a village in the Sindhudurg district of the Konkan division of the Indian state of Maharashtra.
