= Vaibhavwadi taluka =

Vaibhavwadi
- town
- Location in Maharashtra, India
- Coordinates: 16°29′47″N 73°44′45″E
- Country: India
- State: Maharashtra
- Region: Konkan
- District: Sindhudurg

Languages
  - Official: Marathi, Malvani
- Time zone: UTC+5:30 (IST)
- PIN: 416810
- Nearest city: Kolhapur
- Website: sindhudurg.nic.in

Vaibhavwadi taluka is a taluka in Kankavli subdivision of Sindhudurg district in the Indian state of Maharashtra.
