= Tulsuli =

Village in Maharashtra

- village
- Country: India
- State: Maharashtra
- District: Sindhudurg

Languages
- Time zone: UTC+5:30 (IST)
- Vehicle registration: AP-

Tulsuli is a village in Kudal Taluka of Sindhudurg District in Maharashtra at Mumbai Goa Road. It is known for the Lingeshwar Temple of Shiva, one of the main deities in Hindu religion, and the higher education facility of Lingeshwar Vidhyalay.

== Education ==
The Lingeswar Vidyalay Junior College is a co-ed secondary and post-secondary school that employs nine educators. The school is attended by about 460 students on a yearly basis. Subjects taught to secondary students include Hindi, English, math, science and social science. Post-secondary students are taught accounting, economics and political science.
