= International Scuba Diving Training Centre =

International Scuba Diving Training Centre is in Tarkarli, a village in Maharashtra . The state government in collaboration with Maharashtra Tourism Development Corporation has set up the International Scuba Diving Training Centre to train lifeguards. These trained lifeguards are allocated to the beaches along the coast. International instructors teach the lifeguards. IISDA (Indian Institute of Scuba Diving and Aquatic Sports) has been selected for this initiative.
