= Mhapan =

Village in Maharashtra

- Village
- Interactive map of Mhapan
- Country: India
- State: Maharashtra

Mhapan is a village surrounded by hillocks in Sindhudurg district, Maharashtra, India. Mhapan has its own shoreline, and it is around 12.9 kilometres (8 mi) from the famous Vengurla beach and is just a stone's throw away from the serene beaches of Khavane and Nivati. Mhapan has a population of 5,000. Mhapan panchkroshi (adjoining villages) contains approximate 15000 population under villages Khavane, Nivati, Malaiee, Kochra, Medha, Shriramwadi and Paat.

Mhapan has banking facility from Sindhudurg District Central Co-Operative Bank (Now- Sindhudurg Bank, Kotak Mahindra Bank and ATM facility by Bank Of India and Sindhudurg Bank. Mhapan has administrative police station 'Saagari Police station - Nivati) which controls all the surrounding villages of Mhapan having population approx. 25000.

The Mhapan post office pin code is 416522. It has Cellular network coverage of BSNL service.
