= Akhil Bharatiya Marathi Natya Parishad =

Indian Marathi-language theatre company

Akhil Bharatiya Marathi Natya Parishad अखिल भारतीय मराठी नाट्य परिषद
- President: Prashant Damle
- Founder: Anant Waman Barve
- Founded: 1905
- Headquarters: Yashwantrao Chavan Natya Sankul, Matunga (W), Mumbai

Website
- https://www.natyaparishad.org

Akhila Bhāratīya Marāṭhī Nāṭya Pariṣhad is a Marathi theatre body who arrange Akhil Bharatiya Marathi Natya Sammelan (All-India Marathi Theatre Meet) annually. It was founded in year 1905 by Anant Waman Barve with the help of Babajirao Rane of "Rajapurkar Natak Mandali" and Mujumdar, manager of Kirloskar Natak Mandali. At that time in the erstwhile Bombay State there were many drama companies performing Marathi dramas. Barve was a playwright and wrote a number of dramas performed by different drama companies. He floated the idea of having a central body for Marathi theatre to bring together these drama companies on a common platform to solve problems faced by them. Finally many drama companies agreed to an annual gathering and Barve was chosen as its Hon. Secretary.

The first Sammelan was presided by Babasaheb Khaparde a well known Leader of social and political movement in Maharashtra. The present name of the Parishad and the constitution was finalised in the year 1960 in the Delhi Meet of the Parishad. So far every year Meet is arranged at different locations in India where Marathi drama is popular.

1. Current president

- Prashant Damle

== Past presidents ==
- Prasad Macchindra Kambali
- Mohan Joshi
- Macchindra Kambli
