= Giovan Battista Verle =

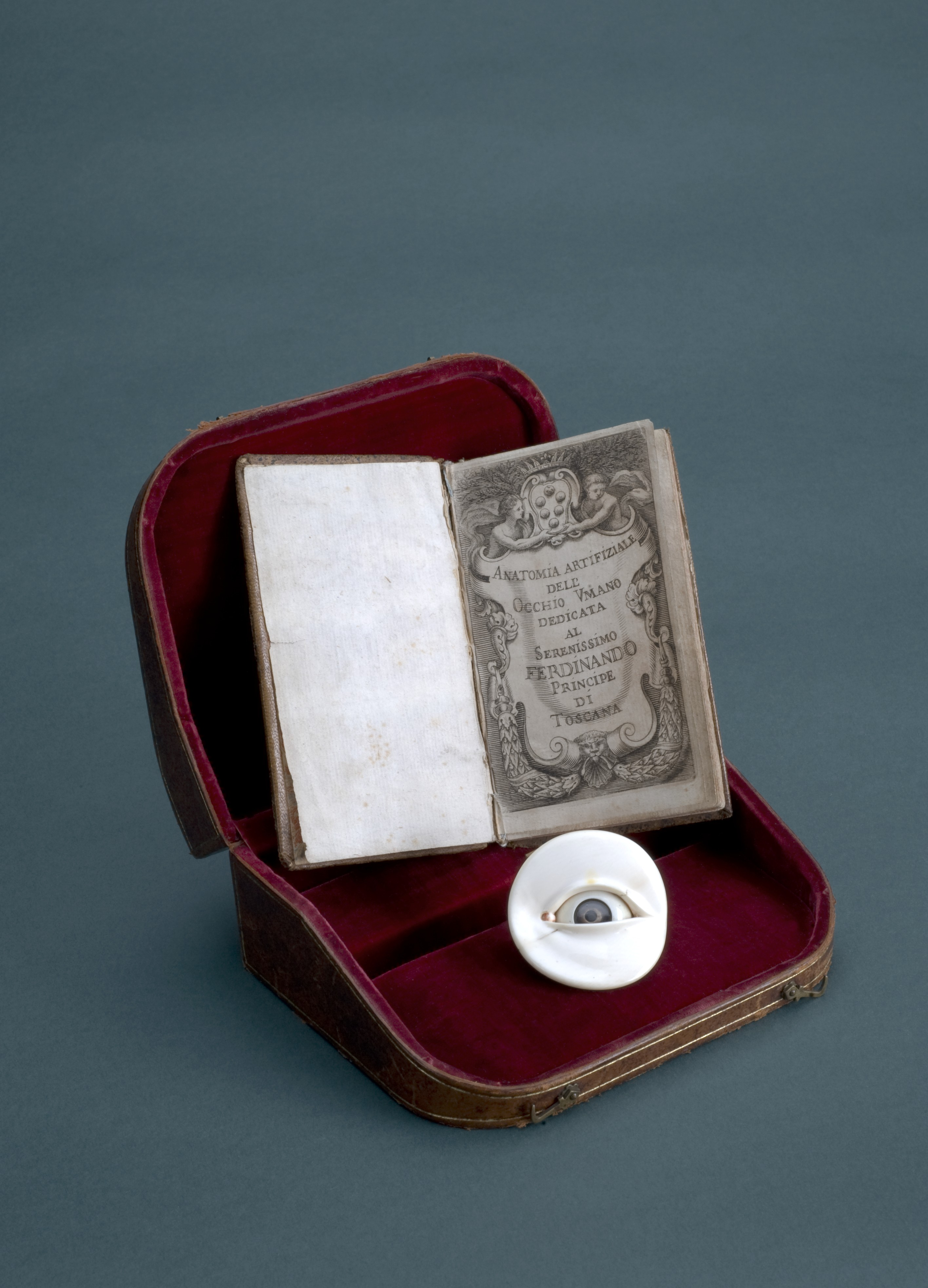
Credit: Wellcome Collection

Giovan Battista Verle was a 17th-century Italian instrument maker.

LIttle is known about Verle. In Venice, in the footsteps of his father Giovanni, he built an anatomical model of the human eye with the help of Antonio Molinetti, professor of anatomy at the University of Padua. In Florence, he was encouraged to make a model of the eye by Antonio Magliabecchi (1633-1714), librarian to the Grand Duke, and Giuseppe Zambeccari (1659-1729), professor of anatomy, University of Pisa. In 1680 he published Anatomia artificialis oculi humani inventa & recens fabricata (via Munich Digitization Center)
