= Oros, Sindhudurg =

Oros Sindhudurgnagari
- City
- Interactive map of Oros
- Coordinates: 16°06′56″N 73°42′27″E
- Country: India
- State: Maharashtra
- District: Sindhudurg

Languages
  - Official: Marathi
- Time zone: UTC+5:30 (IST)
- PIN: 416812
- Telephone code: 02362
- Vehicle registration: MH-07
- Literacy: 99%
- Climate: Am

Oros (Marathi: ओरोस) is a town in Maharashtra, India, and serves as the district headquarters of Sindhudurg district. It is also referred to as Sindhudurgnagari. The predominant language spoken in the region is Malvani, a dialect of Konkani.

Sindhudurgnagari is a planned township located in Oros Budruk. The town is connected by National Highway 66 (formerly NH-17), which links it to major cities like Mumbai, Thane, Karwar, and Mangaluru. The nearest railway station is Sindhudurg railway station, situated on the Konkan Railway zonw.

Oros hosts several key administrative and public institutions, including the District Collector’s office, Zilla Parishad office, District Court, District Hospital, and other state government offices.
