= Kurli, Talupula mandal =

Kurli
- village
- Interactive map of Kurli
- Location in Andhra Pradesh, India Kurli (India)
- Coordinates: 14°16′34.48″N 78°11′47.68″E
- Country: India
- State: Andhra Pradesh
- District: Sri Sathya Sai

Population (2001)
  - Total: 3,412

Languages
  - Official: Telugu
- Time zone: UTC+5:30 (IST)
- Vehicle registration: AP-

Kurli is a village which is to the south of Pulivendula in Talupula mandal of Sri Sathya Sai district in the state of Andhra Pradesh in India.

== Geography ==
Its latitude is 14°16′34.48″N 78°11′47.68″E.

== Demographics ==
According to Indian census, 2001, the demographic details of Kurli village is as follows:

- Total Population: 3,412 in 866 Households
- Male Population: 1,717 and Female Population: 1,695
- Children Under 6-years of age: 421 (Boys - 208 and Girls - 213)
- Total Literates: 1,438
