= Shiroda (Maharashtra) =

Village in Maharashtra

- Village
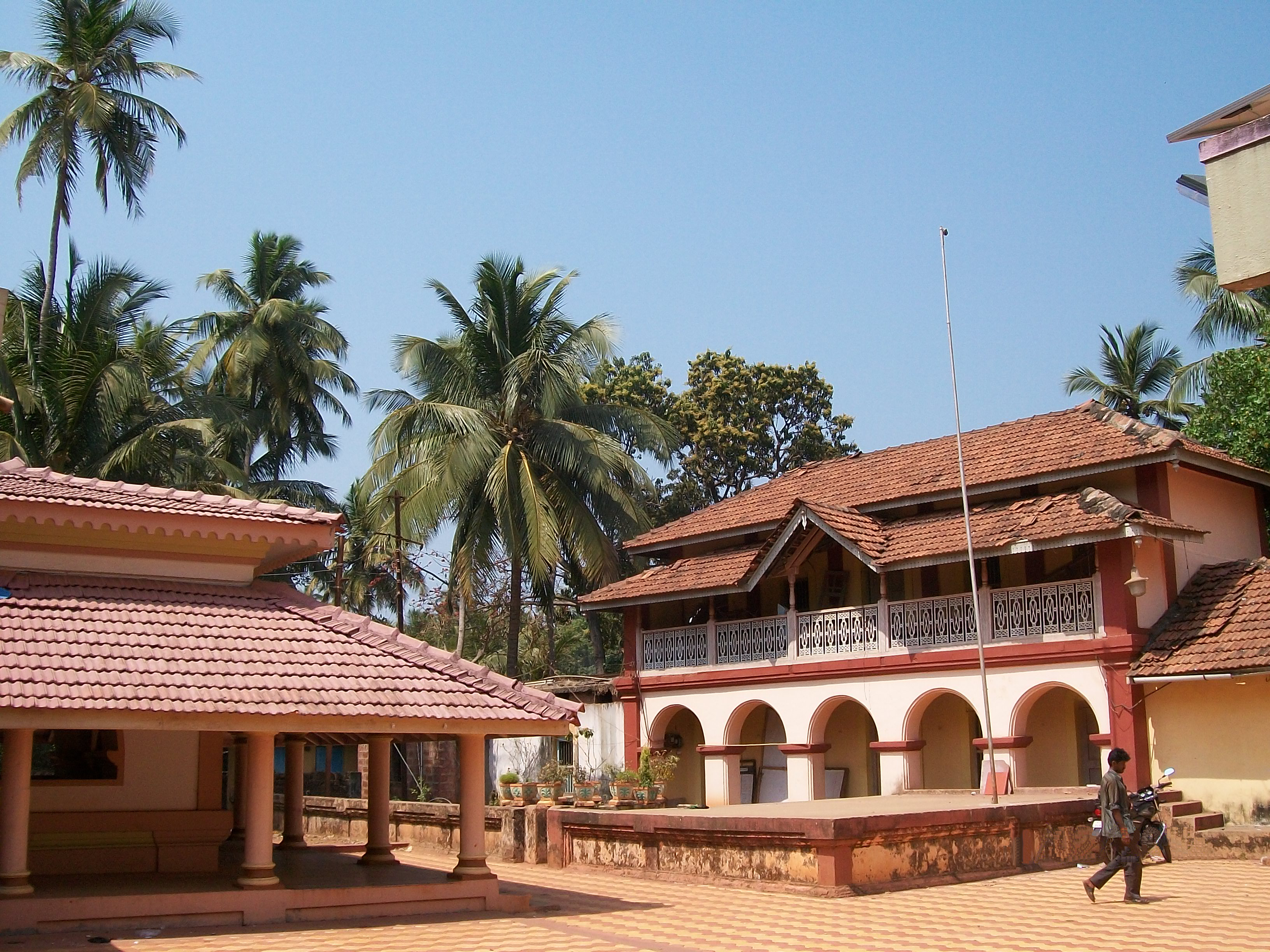
- Country: India
- State: Maharashtra
- ISO 3166 code: IN-MH

Shiroda (Konkani-Shirodem, Marathi-Shiroda) is a small village in South Konkan in Vengurla taluka, Sindhudurg district, (Maharashtra), India, with a long stretch of beach. The village is famous for its pristine beach, weekly market (held every Sunday), clothing shops, salt pans, fish market, and jetties. Small hillocks surround the region, along with mango and cashew plantations.

The village hosts various temples, major being that of the presiding deity of village Shri Devi Mauli Devasthan, followed by many Dattatreya temples, a Hanuman temple, a Giroba temple and the most famous of all Vetoba Temple which is in the vicinity of the village. A proposed Hotel by a renowned group of hotels is also under consideration. Ganeshotsav is celebrated annually in every household.

The peculiarities of Beach of Shiroda is its extensive sea coast with white sand, with Terekhol river in South creating a lagoon like topology and Mochemad river giving rise to a small delta like creek. Adventure watersports in this region have started gaining popularity.

There are 4 widely-known beach spots here: Shiroda Beach (Paradise Beach); Arawali Beach; Mochemad Beach; and Redi Beach. Situated in Arawali, consists of a long stretch of land starting from Shiroda beach to tank beach and followed with the Mochemad Beach one might see clean white sand beach, with a vast diverse species of marine life, dolphins being the major attraction.

The initial fame of village can be derived from V.S.Khandekar, a prominent figure in Marathi literature, who made this village his workplace for decades. Another event attracting history's attention to the village was Satyagraha at salt pans in Shiroda during Salt Satyagraha movement led by Mohandas Karamchand Gandhi.

It is also famous for the fish cuisine and various malvani cuisines, one can experience a perfect blend of Goan and Malvani cultures in some parts of village. It has excellent landscape views.

The J.B. Naik clothing shop is a institution dealing in clothes more than a century, being largest shop in the market area makes it on list of locals as well as Goan and foreign tourists. Soudagar shop is well known general store in Shiroda, located exactly in centre of market.

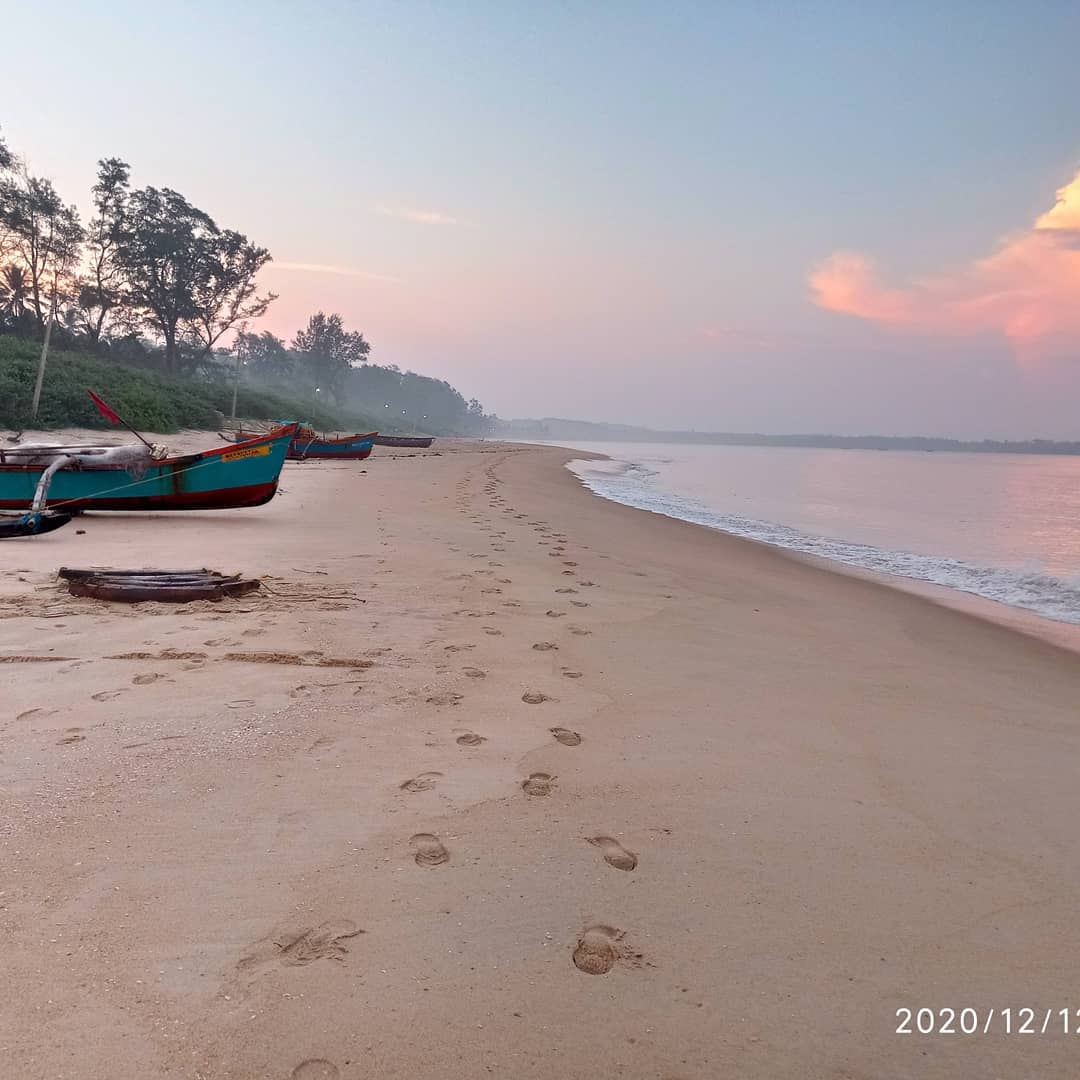
Shiroda Paradise Beach

Shiroda is accessible by road, both Maharashtra state's Carrier services (MHST) as well as State of Goa's (Kadamba) provide frequent bus transportation services to the village. The nearest airports are Sindhudurg Airport in Maharashtra and Manohar International Airport in Goa .
