= Malvan taluka =

Taluka in Maharashtra, India

Malvan taluka is a taluka in Sindhudurg district of Maharashtra, a state in Western India.
