= Kankavli =

- City
- Location in Maharashtra, India
- Coordinates: 16°16′10″N 73°42′30″E
- Country: India
- State: Maharashtra
- District: Sindhudurg

Government
  - Body: Municipal Council (Nagarpanchayat)

Area
  - Total: 8.46 km^{2} (3.27 sq mi)
- Elevation: 42 m (138 ft)

Population (2011)
  - Total: 116,398

Languages
  - Official: Malvani, Marathi
- Time zone: UTC+5:30 (IST)
- PIN: 416602
- Area code: 91 - 2367
- Vehicle registration: MH-07
- Website: sindhudurg.nic.in

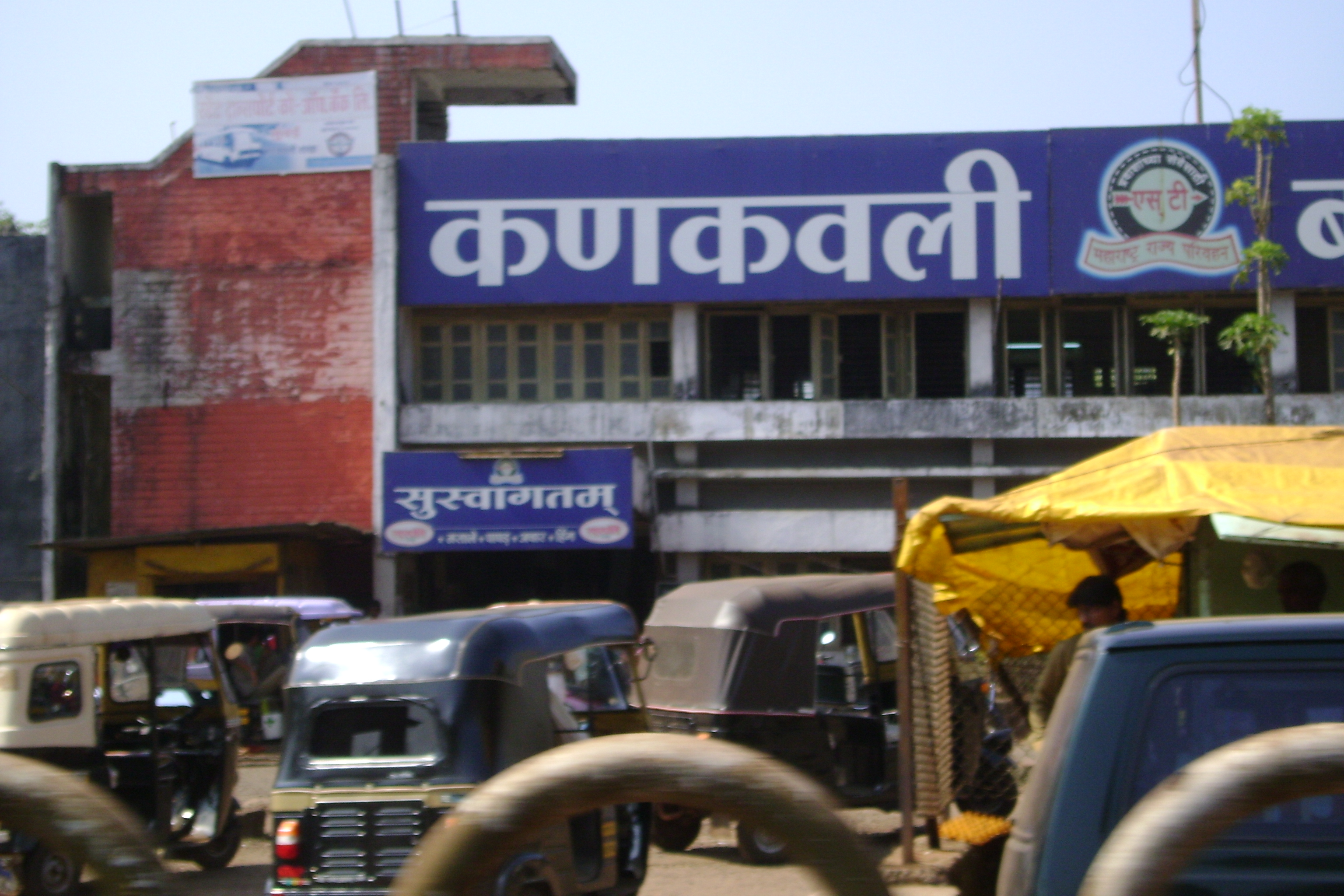
Kankavli Bus Depot

Kankavli is a city in Sindhudurg district in the southwest of the Indian state of Maharashtra, in the center of the Sindhudurg district. It has an elevation of 42 metres and is on the banks of two rivers, the Gad River and the Janavli River. It has a railway station on the Konkan Railway.

== Demographics ==
As of 2011 India census, Kankavli had a population of 116,398. Males constitute 52% of the population and females 48%. Kankavli is the third biggest city in Sindhudurg District after Sawantwadi and Malvan. Kankavli has an average literacy rate of 77%, higher than the national average of 59.5%: male literacy is 79%, and female literacy is 74%. In Kankavli, 12% of the population is under 6 years of age.

== Climate ==
Climate data for Kankavli
Month	Jan	Feb	Mar	Apr	May	Jun	Jul	Aug	Sep	Oct	Nov	Dec	Year
Mean daily maximum °C (°F)	27 (81)	25 (77)	20 (68)	22 (72)	21 (70)	17 (63)	20 (68)	17 (63)	20 (68)	28 (82)	27 (81)	29 (84)	23 (73)
Mean daily minimum °C (°F)	22 (72)	17 (63)	19 (66)	19 (66)	19 (66)	19 (66)	19 (66)	20 (68)	19 (66)	24 (75)	24 (75)	23 (73)	20 (69)
Average precipitation mm (inches)	0.8 (0.03)	1.2 (0.05)	3.3 (0.13)	9.1 (0.36)	123.6 (4.87)	609.6 (24.00)	393.2 (15.48)	291.8 (11.49)	213.0 (8.39)	150.4 (5.92)	24.4 (0.96)	6.0 (0.24)	1,826.4 (71.92)
Source: World Weather Online

== Politics ==
Kankavli is a Vidhansabha (state legislative) constituency of former Chief Minister of Maharashtra Narayan Rane. Kankavli has its own Nagarpanchayat (Municipal Council) (local authority), a Panchayat Samitee office, Tehsildar Office, Taluka Court, and other administrative offices.
