= Malvani dialect =

Konkani dialect spoken in India

Malvani
- मालवणी
- Pronunciation: maːlʋaɳiː (standard) maːlʋaniː (popular)
- Native to: India
- Region: Malvan, Sindhudurg, Maharashtra, Goa
- Native speakers: (undated figure of 870,000)
- Language family: Indo-European: Indo-Iranian; Indo-Aryan; Southern Zone; Marathi–Konkani; Malvani
- Writing system: Devanagari

Language codes
- ISO 639-3: –
- Linguist List: gom-kud
- Glottolog: None

Malvani is a dialect of Konkani with significant number of loanwords from Marathi. Although Malvani does not have a unique script, the Devanagari script is used by most speakers. Malvani is sometimes used for sarcastic newspaper articles and local folk stage dramas known as Dashavatar.

== Difference from standard Marathi ==
All pronouns have a change from la to ka. Words in Marathi for "yes", "this", "that", "where", "here", "there", have different Malvani counterparts. Other grammatical nuances differ from standard Marathi.

== Geographical distribution ==
Malvani is spoken in the Sindhudurg district of Maharashtra.

== Malvani in popular culture ==
The first ever Drama (Natak) was Vastraharan, which got huge popularity starring Macchindra Kambli.

The Zee Marathi channel's February 2016 serial Ratris Khel Chale was a horror TV serial on the life of the Naik family from Malvan, and used Malvani as the main dialect.

In January 2019, Ratris Khel Chale 2 was streamed in Malvani, as well as Gaav Gata Gajali which became popular for its focus on Malvani Culture & Lifestyle. In March 2021, Ratris Khel Chale 3 started streaming.

In 2019, movie named Picasso was released on Amazon prime which was based on the story of struggling artist of dashavtar (malvani art form).

Other noted Marathi movies based on Malvani culture are Narbachi Wadi (2013), Murder Mestry (2015), and Redu (2017).

== See also ==
- Malvan region
- Malvani people
- Malvani cuisine
- Malvan
- Sawantwadi
- Sindhudurg District
