= Sawantwadi =

Town in Maharashtra, India

- City
- Location in Maharashtra, India Sawantwadi (India)
- Coordinates: 16°N 73.75°E
- Country: India
- State: Maharashtra
- District: Sindhudurg
- Elevation: 111.86 m (367.0 ft)

Population (2011)
  - Total: 47,921

Languages
  - Official: Marathi
- Time zone: UTC+5:30 (IST)
- PIN: 416510
- Telephone code: 91(0)2363
- Vehicle registration: MH-07
- Website: smcsawantwadi.in

Sawantwadi is a city located in Sawantwadi Taluka, in the state of Maharashtra in Konkan region which is in the mid-western coast of India.

== History ==
The Sawant's, in early seventeenth century, were the feudal holders of the hereditary right Deshmukh under the rule of Adil Shahi, whom they regarded as their master. The Marathas under the legendary Shivaji and Portuguese at Goa were the other two important powers which came into contact with Sawantwadi.

Mang Sawant was founder of Sawant Bhonsle dynasty. He was followed by Khem Sawant I in 1627. He was rewarded Jagir from the Bijapur's Adilshah and later made himself independent, followed by Lakham Sawant the first. It was only during the period of Lakham Sawant I that the Sawant family, with Hodawade as the headquarters, came into political prominence.

After his demise, Khem Sawant II succeeded him.

Khem Sawant II established his capital at Sundarwadi (now Sawantwadi), a hamlet of the village Charathe which later came to be known as Sawantwadi as the rulers were known as Sawants. He helped Mughals against Chhatrapati Shivaji Maharaj and in return got more territory from them. Khem Savant was succeeded by his son Som Savant and ruled for only 18 months and later his brother, Lakham Savant succeeded him.

Lakham Sawant didn't abide by the terms of the treaty (1659), betrayed Chhatrapati Shivaji Maharaj by joining Bijapur Sultanate. In 1660, Shivaji sent one of his earliest followers, Baji Pasalkar. He fought a drawn battle with Lakham's commander Kay Savant.In 1662, Shivaji Maharaj defeated Lakham. In the later history, Lakham Sawant was slain in battle with Chhatrapati Shivaji Maharaj.

Pancham Khemraj alias Bapusaheb Maharaj was crowned on 29 October 1924. In 1937 he surrendered to the British Empire.

He was succeeded by his incapable son Shivramraje Bhonsale, but he being a minor at the time, Bapusaheb’s wife Parvatidevi looked after the State as a Regent. The administration of the Sawantwadi State during her regency was marked by several reforms and progress in education.Shivramraje Bhonsale converted the 18th century royal palace of Sawantwadi Royal family, into a art boutique hotel,working as a chef and receptionist there.

== Culture ==
=== Ganjifa Cards ===
Each suit in the Ganjifa game has a different colour for its background. The colours typical to Sawantwadi are red, green, yellow, brown and black. The back of the cards have typically a uniform colour which is orange. It is usually played with 3 players.

=== Lacquerwares ===
The craft of lacquerware was introduced in Sawantwadi around the end of 17th century by the Telangana Brahmins who came from Andhra Pradesh.During the 18th and the 19th centuries, various schools of this craft were started in Sawantwadi. The Ganjifa cards were made from paper that were covered with a mixture of tamarind seed powder and oil, painted and coated with lac. Presently, the painting of floral borders and motifs and mythological figures is done with water-based tempera colours and these are then covered with lacquer in order to preserve and enhance their color values.

=== Sawantwadi museum ===
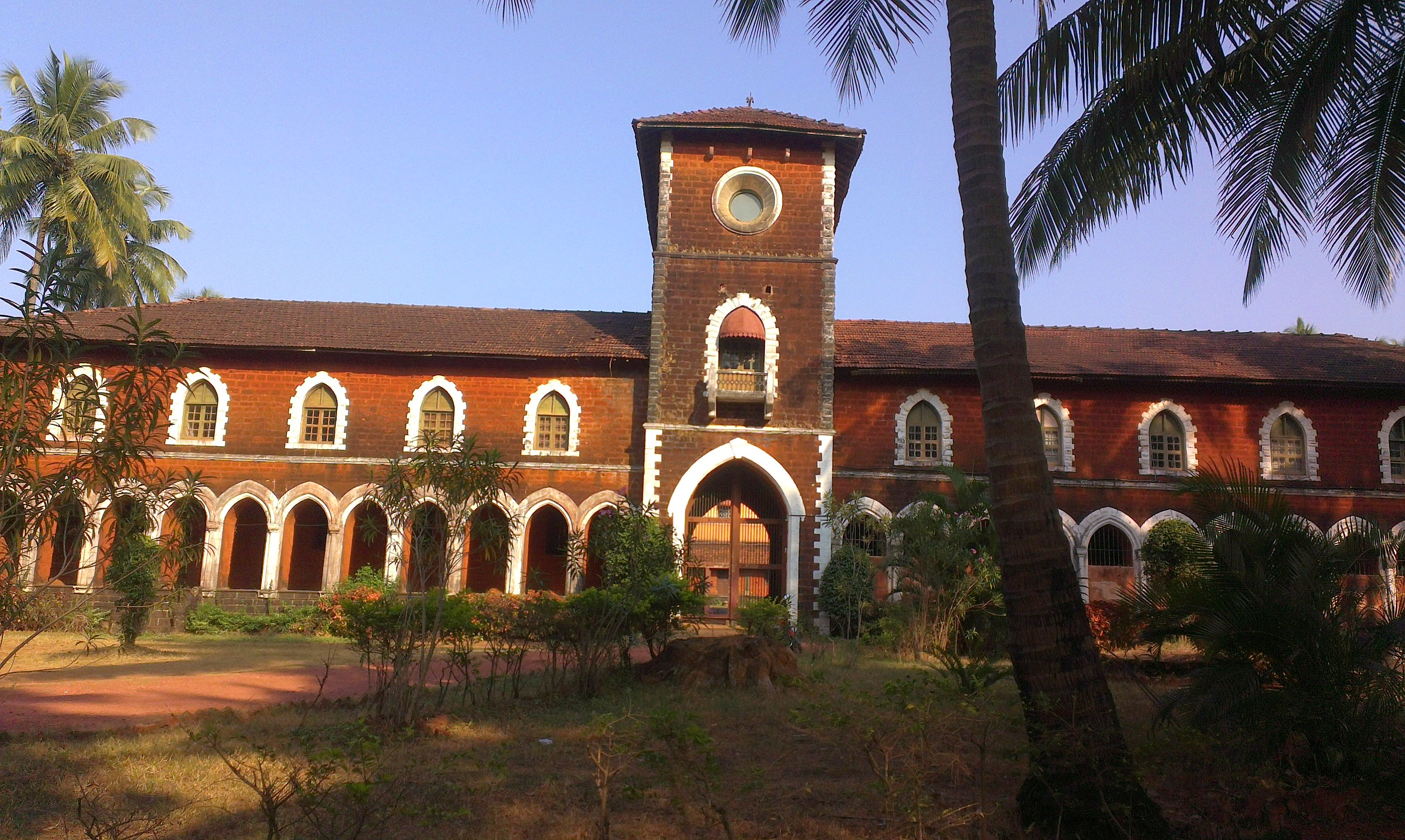
Sawantwadi Palace

Sawantwadi palace also houses a museum in few of their rooms which is mainly dedicated to the Royal Family and Ganjifa- the art of sawantwadi.

The museum was opened in 2005 by Lt. Her Highness Rajmata Satvashiladevi Bhonsle. The museum collection includes photographs and paintings of the Royal Family Members, Coronation of the kings over the years, artworks by king and queen.

== Geography and climate ==
Sawantwadi is located at 16°N 73.75°E in the Sindhudurg district of Maharashtra.
