= Sindhudurg district =

Coordinates: 16°06′32″N 73°41′27″E

- District of Maharashtra
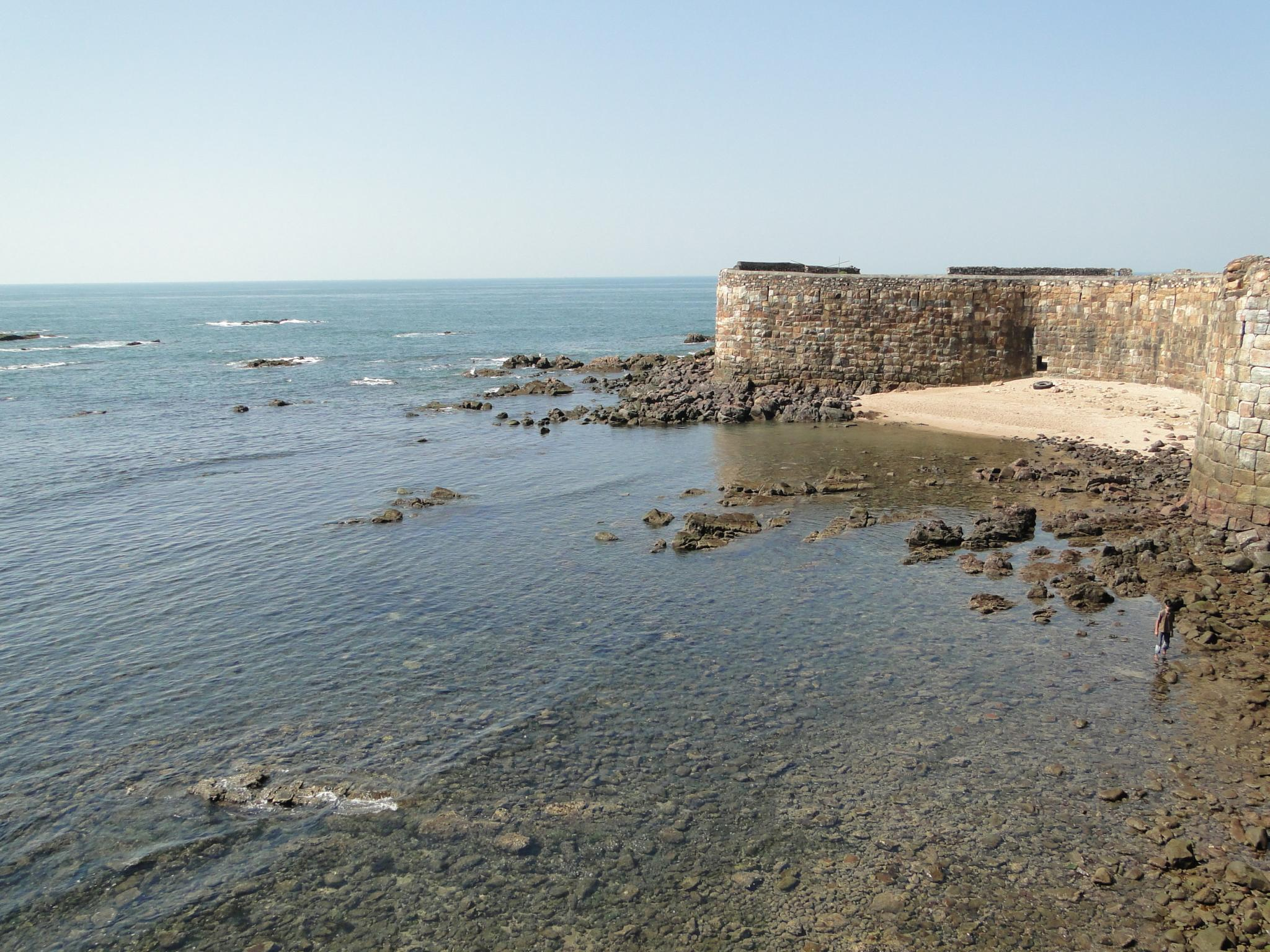
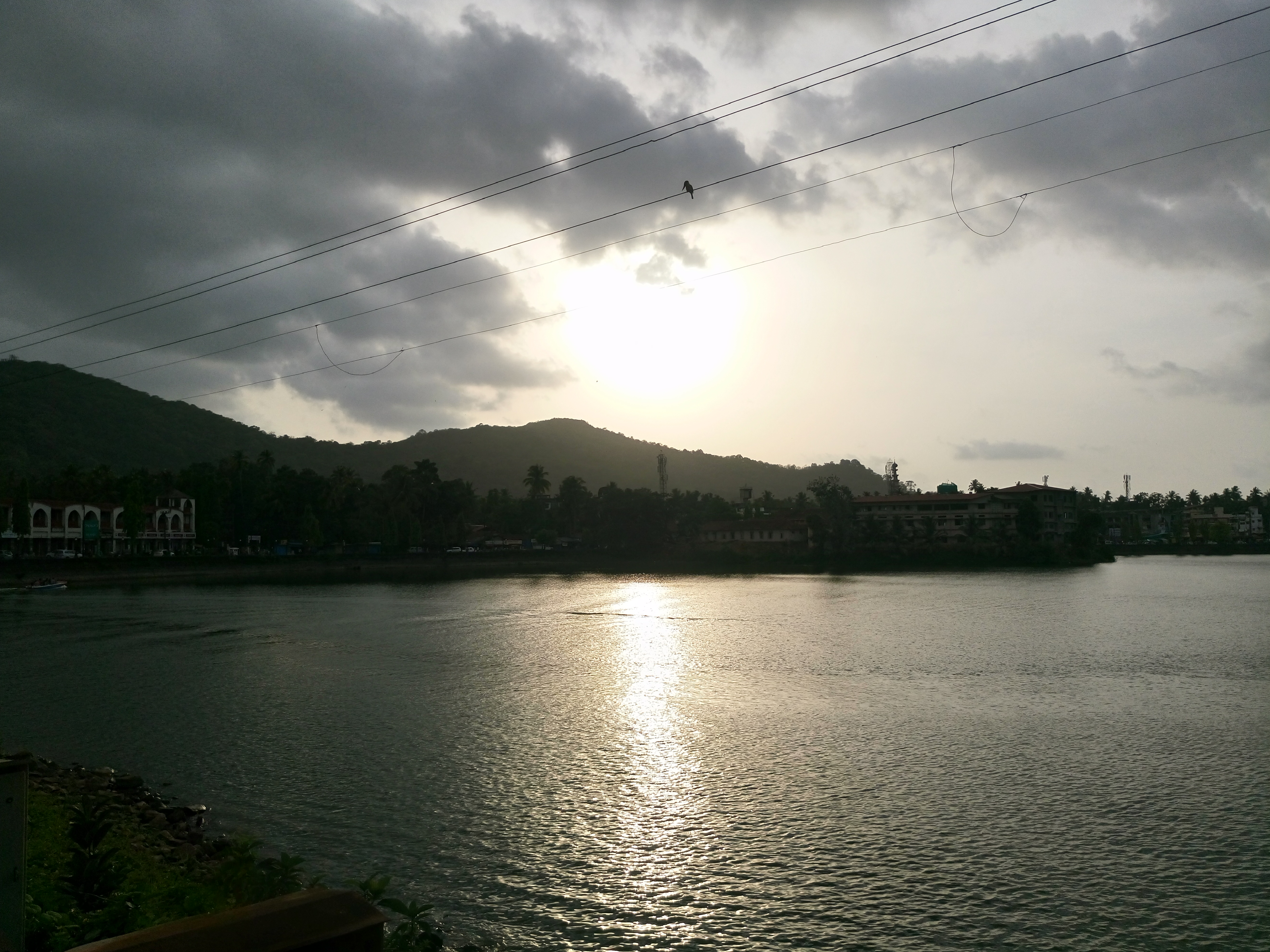
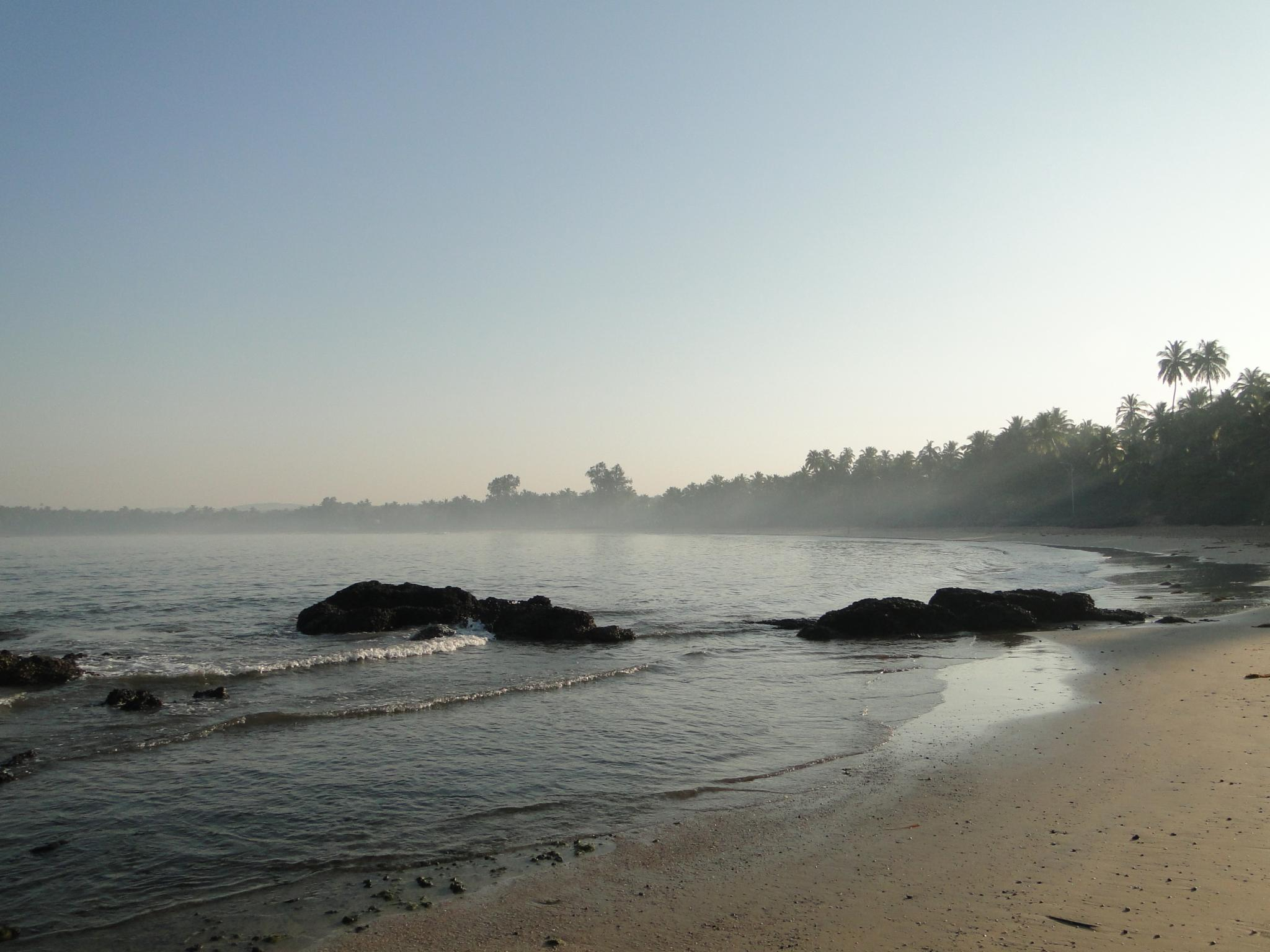
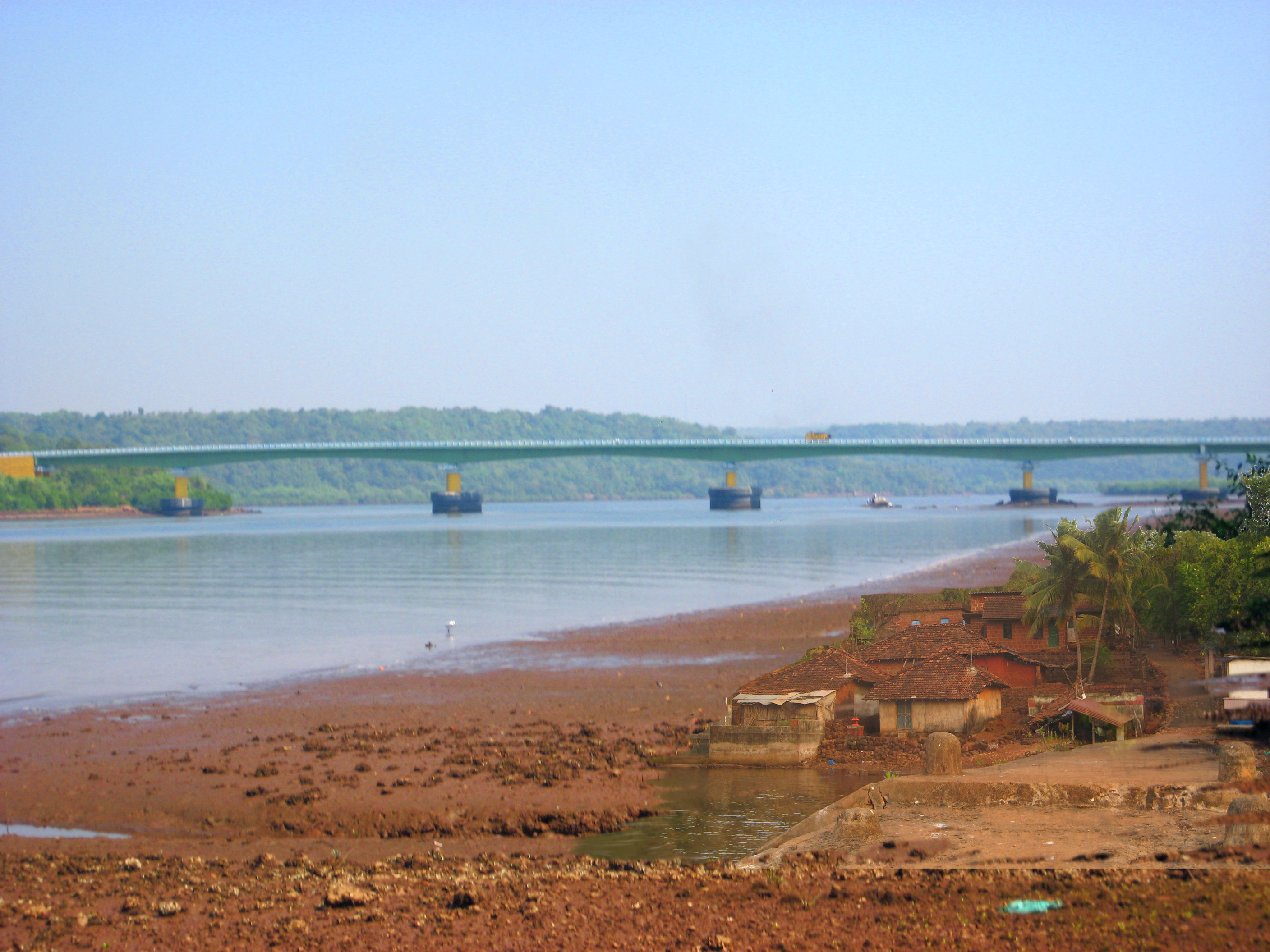
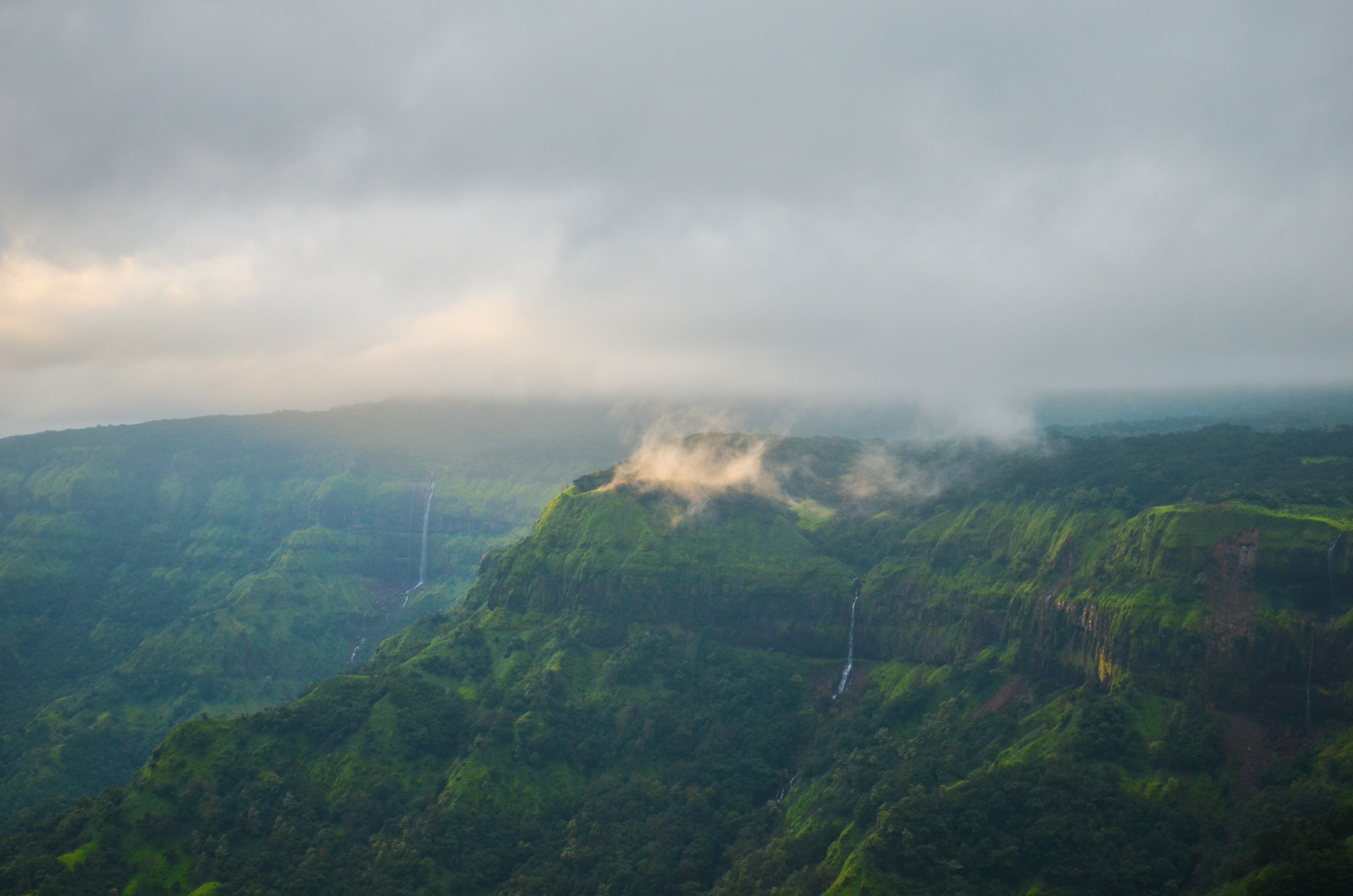
- Clockwise from top-left: Sindhudurg Fort, sunset at Sawantwadi, Tirlot Bridge, Amboli Ghat, Chivla Beach

- Location in Maharashtra
- Country: India
- State: Maharashtra
- Division: Konkan
- Headquarters: Oros
- Talukas: 1. Dodamarg, 2. Sawantwadi, 3. Vengurla, 4. Kudal, 5. Malvan, 6. Kankavli, 7. Devgad, 8. Vaibhavwadi

Government
  - Body: Sindhudurg Zilla Parishad
  - Guardian Minister: Nitesh Narayan Rane (Cabinet Minister MH)
  - President Z. P. Sindhudurg: NA
  - District Collector: Ms. K. Manjulekshmi (IAS)
  - CEO Z. P. Sindhudurg: NA
  - MPs: Narayan Rane (Ratnagiri–Sindhudurg)

Area
  - Total: 5,207 km^{2} (2,010 sq mi)

Population (2011)
  - Total: 849,651
  - Density: 163.2/km^{2} (422.6/sq mi)
  - Urban: 12.59%

Demographics
  - Literacy: 85.56%
  - Sex ratio: 1,036
- Time zone: UTC+05:30 (IST)
- Major highways: NH-66
- Average annual precipitation: 3,287 mm
- Website: sindhudurg.nic.in/en/

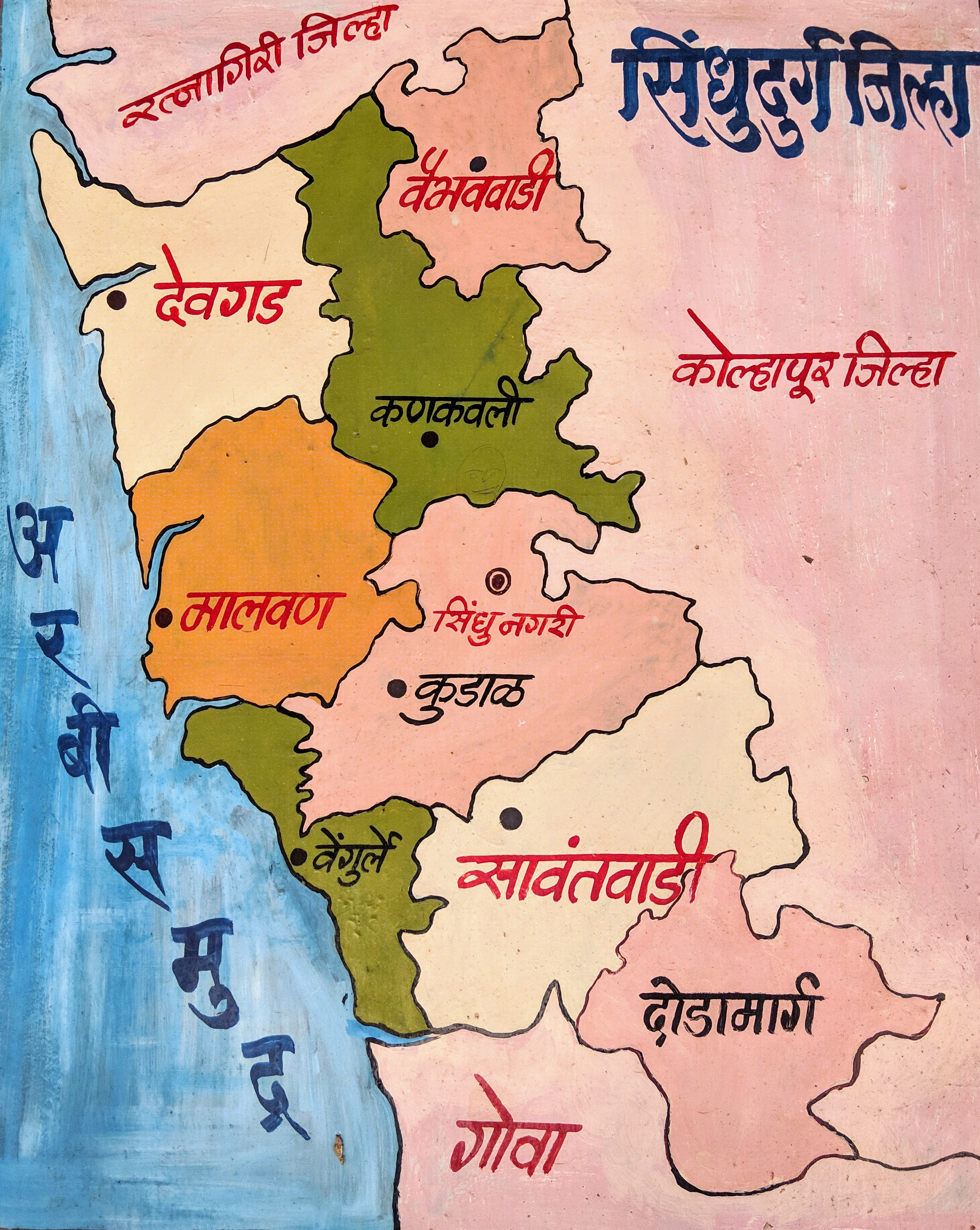
Map of Sindhudurg district with its talukas

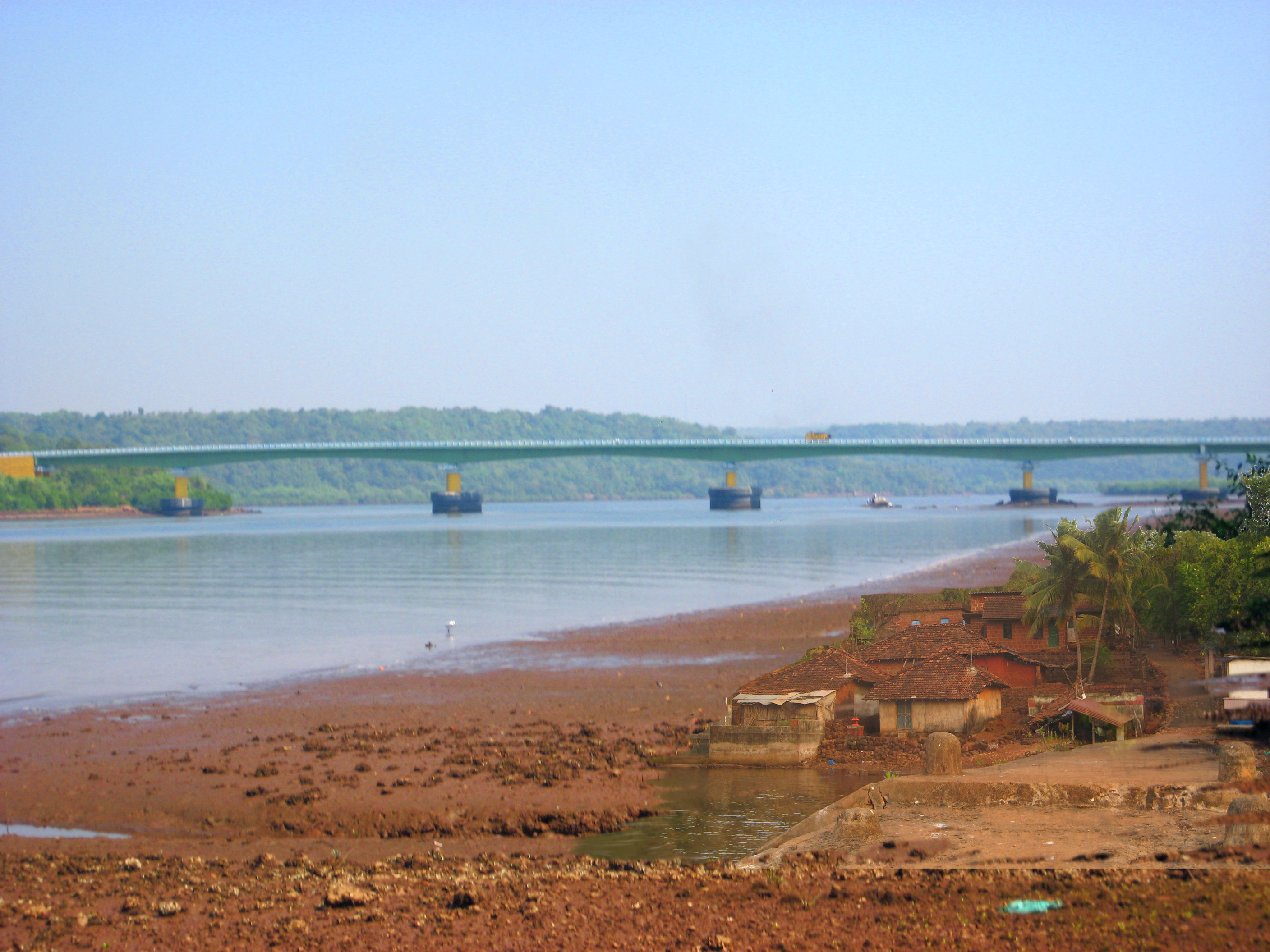
Tirlot Bridge, north of Amberi

Sindhudurg district (Marathi pronunciation: [sin̪d̪ʱud̪uɾɡə]) is an administrative district of the Konkan division in India, which was carved out of the erstwhile Ratnagiri district. The district headquarters are located at Oros. The district occupies an area of approximately 5,207 km^{2} and has a population of 849,651, of which 12.59% were urban (as of 2011). As of 2011, it is the least populous district of Maharashtra (out of 36). Sindhudurg district is located in western part of Maharashtra.

Guardian Minister
- पालकमंत्री
- Emblem of India
- Style: The Honourable
- Appointer: Chief Minister of Maharashtra
- Term length: 5 years / No time limit
- Website: http://http:

== History ==
Sindhudurg district was established on 1 May 1981.

The word 'Konkan' is of Indian origin and considerable antiquity, though the origin of the name has never been definitively explained. The seven kingdoms of the Konkan of mythology are mentioned in the History of Kashmir and are said to have included nearly the whole west coast of India. The Pandavas are said to have passed through this region in the 13th year of their exile and to have settled in this area for some time. The Raja of this region, Veerat Ray, accompanied them in the war at Kurukshetra with the Kauravas.

In the middle of the sixth century, kings of the Maurya and Nala dynasties appear to have ruled in the Konkan. The district of Ratnagiri was under the Silahars, and the capital of their kingdom was probably Goa. Later it may have been relocated to a more central place in the vicinity of Ratnagiri or Kharepatan. Chandrapur was one of the most ancient towns in Konkan, probably founded by Chandraditya, son of the Chalukya king Pulakeshin II.

The 16th century saw the advent and rise of Portuguese power on the west coast of India and Sindhudurg was not immune. The sultan lost his hold on the district in 1675 with the rise of Chhatrapati Shivaji Maharaj, and the district became part of the Maratha Empire. Marathas continued to rule the district till 1817, when the conflict between the British and the Peshwas concluded and the whole of Konkan was transferred to the British.

In 1819 South Konkan was formed as separate district with its headquarters first at Bankot and later at Ratnagiri. Three northern subdivisions were transferred to Thane district in 1830 and the district was reduced to a sub-collectorate level under Thane district. In 1832, it was again made a full-fledged district and named Ratnagiri district. In the year 1945, a new Mahal (tahsil) called Kankavli Mahal (tahsil) was formed. The former Indian state of Sawantwadi was merged with the district and the taluka boundaries reorganized in the year 1949. In the same year the new taluka of Sawantwadi was created and two new mahals, Kudal and Lanja, were formed. With the reorganization of states in 1956, the district was included in Bombay State and since 1960, it is a part of Maharashtra. The name of the district has been adopted from the sea fort of Sindhudurg. This was built by Shivaji Maharaj near Malwan and its name literally means 'Sea Fort'. Its construction started on 25 November 1664 and was completed in three years, designed such that it could not be seen easily by enemies coming from the Arabian Sea.

Sindhudurg district is the southern part of the Konkan coast which is historically known for its long coast line and safe harbours. Sindhudurg district was earlier a part of Ratnagiri district. For administrative convenience and industrial and agricultural development, Ratnagiri district was divided into Ratnagiri and Sindhudurg with effect from 1 May 1981. Sindhudurg district now comprises the eight tahsils of Sawantwadi, Kudal, Vengurla, Malvan, Devgad, Kankavli, Vaibhavwadi and Dodamarg.

== Geography ==
Sindhudurg district is the southernmost district of Maharashtra. It has deposits of Iron, Bauxite and Manganese. Sindhudurg is bordered on the north by Ratnagiri district, on the south east by Belagavi district of Karnataka state and south by the state of Goa, on the west by the Arabian Sea, and to the east across the crest of the Western Ghats or Sahyadris is Kolhapur district. Sindhudurg is part of the Konkan (coastal) region, a narrow coastal plain in western Maharashtra which lies between the Western Ghats and the Arabian Sea.

Sindhudurg has a semi-tropical climate and remains warm and humid most of the year. It has three clear seasons: rainy (June–October), Winter (November–mid February) and Summer (mid February–May). Temperatures rise to a maximum of 32 °C and monsoon winds bring heavy rains (average rainfall 3240.10 mm).

The people of Sindhudurg district mostly speak "Malvani" a distinct dialect of Konkani and Marathi; almost all are fluent in Marathi as well.

== Administrative Divisions ==
The eight talukas of this district are Devgad, Kankavli, Malvan, Kudal, Sawantwadi, Vengurla and Dodamarg and Vaibhavwadi.

There are three Vidhan Sabha constituencies in this district. These are Kankavli, Sawantwadi and Kudal. All of these are part of the Ratnagiri-Sindhudurg Lok Sabha constituency.

- Talukas: 8
- Towns: 16
- Municipal Councils: 3
- Nagar Panchayats: 5
- Gram Panchayats: 433
- Villages: 743
- Police Stations: 9
- Police Outposts: 23

=== Tehsils and Panchayat Samiti ===
1. Dodamarg
2. Sawantwadi
3. Kudal
4. Vengurla
5. Malvan
6. Kankavli
7. Devgad
8. Vaibhavwadi

=== Nagar Palika ===
1. Sawantwadi
2. Malvan
3. Vengurla

=== Nagar Panchayat ===
1. Kankavli
2. Kudal
3. Vabhave-Vaibhavwadi
4. Devgad-Jamsande
5. Kasai-Dodamarg

=== Proposed Nagar Palikas ===
1. Kankavli
2. Kudal

=== Proposed Nagar Panchayats ===
1. Oros
2. Vijaydurg
3. Amboli
4. Banda
5. Nerur
6. Rameshwar
7. Majgaon
8. Kalmath

=== Cities ===
1. Malvan
2. Vengurla
3. Sawantwadi
4. Vaibhavwadi
5. Devgad
6. Kankavli
7. Kudal
8. Dodamarg
9. Oros

=== Smaller Towns ===
1. Vijaydurg
2. Amboli
3. Banda
4. Nerur
5. Rameshwar
6. Majgaon
7. Kalmath
8. Jamsande
9. Vabhave
10. Kasai

=== Villages ===
1. Kumbhawade
2. Otvane
3. Tulsuli
4. Girye
5. Shiroda
6. Mhapan
7. Mangaon
8. Phondaghat
9. Bhedshi
10. Kot Kamte
11. Kandalgaon
12. Katta
13. Gothos
14. Talere
15. Shirgaon
16. Naringre
17. Kharepatan
18. Achara
19. Sukalwad
20. Khotale
21. Hedul
22. Vanygawde
23. Kasal
24. Pawashi
25. Kadawal
26. Trimbak
27. Masure
28. Bandiwade,(बांदिवडे) Malvan
29. Shiroda
30. Ghonsari
31. Hivale
32. Poip
33. Tirlot
34. Navanagar
35. Amberi
36. Waghotan
37. Tirawade
38. Redi
39. Talvade Gate
40. Tale Bazar
41. Salgaon
42. Bhuibawada- Vaibhavwadi
43. Kunkeshwar
44. Katwan
45. Phanasgaon
46. Undil
47. Manache-Mutat
48. Mathbudruk
49. Budhavle
50. Sanadave
51. Masure
52. Chouke
53. Shivapur Kudal
54. Ovaliye
55. Padel
56. Sarambal
57. Verle
58. Tulas
59. Satuli
60. Akeri
61. Madkhol
62. Karivade
63. Sarmale
64. Kesari
65. Danoli, Sawantwadi
66. Chaukul
67. Fansavde
68. Parpoli
69. Tembavli
- Vengurla taluka
1. Redi
2. Ansur
3. Asoli
4. Dabholi
5. Hodawade
6. Math
7. Pal
8. Tulas
9. Wayangani

== Agriculture ==
Sindhudurg's major crops are Rice, Coconut, Kokum, Mango and Cashew, of which the last three are the major annual crops.

The irrigated area in Sindhudurg is 23.48%, through wells and small canals. 33,910 hectares of the district's agricultural land are irrigated, while 104,390 hectares are not. 74% of the total land holding in the district is held by small and marginal farmers. The district has 38,643 hectares of forest cover.

=== Irrigation ===
- Major projects: 2 (Tilari and Talamba)
- Medium projects: 4
- Small projects (state owned): 33
- Small projects (Zilla Parishad owned): 460

== Education ==
- Primary schools: Zilla Parishad operated – 1469, Private – 49
- Secondary schools: Grantable institutions – 184, Central Government institutions: 1, Private: 22
- Junior Colleges: 43
- Senior Colleges: 7
- D.Ed./ B.Ed. Colleges: 4 + 1
- Medical Colleges Offering MBBS

In Sindhudurg, two colleges currently offer the MBBS program: 1.Government Medical College, Sindhudurg– Located in Oros, this college was established in 2021.

2.SSPM Medical College & Lifetime Hospital, Sindhudurg – Founded in 2017 in village Ranbambuli, Taluka Kudal, and offers 150 MBBS seats annually, approved by NMC.

- Engineering Colleges: 2
- Polytechnic Colleges: 3
- Industrial Training Institutes (ITI): 7 (1. Sawantwadi 2. Malvan 3. Deogad 4. Sindhudurgnagari 5. Vengurla 6. Phondaghat 7. Vaibhavwadi)
- Art Institute: 1 [B. S. Bandekar College of Fine Art (Applied Art), Sawantwadi].

== Demographics ==
Historical population
Year	Pop.	±% p.a.
1901	543,058	—
1911	553,550	+0.19%
1921	531,211	−0.41%
1931	598,968	+1.21%
1941	637,574	+0.63%
1951	676,335	+0.59%
1961	724,817	+0.69%
1971	757,917	+0.45%
1981	780,891	+0.30%
1991	832,152	+0.64%
2001	868,825	+0.43%
2011	849,651	−0.22%

Religions in Sindhudurg district (2011)
Religion	Percent
Hinduism	91.85%
Islam	3.09%
Buddhism	2.91%
Christianity	1.82%
Other or not stated	0.33%

According to the 2011 census Sindhudurg district has a population of 849,651, roughly equal to the nation of Qatar or the US state of South Dakota. This gives it a population ranking of 474th in India (out of a total of 640). The district has a population density of 163 inhabitants per square kilometre (420/sq mi). Its population growth rate over the decade 2001–2011 was -2.21%. Sindhudurg has a sex ratio of 1037 females for every 1000 males, which is second highest in Maharashtra, and a literacy rate of 85.56%. 12.59% of the population live in urban areas. Scheduled Castes and Scheduled Tribes make up 6.54% and 0.82% of the population respectively.

Languages in Sindhudurg district (2011)
1. Marathi (91.2%)
2. Malwani (2.29%)
3. Konkani (1.65%)
4. Urdu (1.54%)
5. Hindi (1.33%)
6. Kannada (0.93%)
7. Others (1.04%)

At the time of the 2011 Census of India, 91.22% of the population spoke Marathi, 2.29% Malwani, 1.65% Konkani, (Note: It seems some Konkani speakers were erronenously recorded as speaking Kukna in the census.) 1.54% Urdu, 1.33% Hindi and 0.93% Kannada as their first language.

	Population	Literacy
Overall	8,49,651	85.56%
Male	4,17,890	91.58%
Female	4,50.935	79.81%

== Economy ==
- Banking sector: The district has
  - Nationalised banks (66 branches), Co-operative banks (106 branches) and rural banks (15 branches).
- Fisheries
  - Sindhudurg has a sea coast length of 121 km. and an Exclusive economic zone spanning 16000 km^{2}.
  - Main fisheries centers of Sindhudurg are 8 – Vijaydurg, Devgad, Nivati, Achara, Malvan, Sarjekot, Vengurla, Shiroda
  - Total fish production: 19273 M. Tons
  - Fisheries Co.Op. Soc.: 34 (total members: 14216)

== Transportation ==
Sindhudurg is connected to the state capital Mumbai by road through the erstwhile National Highway 17 (NH-17), now renumbered as NH-66. This highway also connects the district to neighbouring Goa and Karnataka. There are regular MSRTC and private luxury buses connecting to adjoining cities like Kolhapur (110 km away from Kankavli), Belgaum (90 km from Sawantwadi City), Panaji – Goa (55 km away Sawantwadi & Vengurle). Towns and major villages are well connected to Mumbai as a large percentage of emigrants from the district are based in the Mumbai area. The district is also well connected by Konkan Railway to Mumbai, Thane, Goa and other parts of the country like Mangalore, Karwar Ernakulam, Thiruvananthapuram, Coimbatore, Tirunelveli, Hapa, Veraval, New Delhi, Jodhpur and Porbundar. The main railway stations on this route are Kudal, Kankavli and Sawantwadi. Many trains halt at these stations. The nearest major airports are Mopa & Dabolim in Goa which is around 80 km from cities like Sawantwadi, Kudal and Vengurle. Sindhudurg Airport at Chipi-Parule, near Malvan was inaugurated in 2019.Currently Alliance Air, a subsidiary of Air India provides daily flight services to and from Mumbai & Fly91 provides alternate day flights to Bangalore & Hyderabad.

== Geographical indication ==
Sindhudurg and Ratnagiri Kokum was awarded the Geographical Indication (GI) status tag from the Geographical Indications Registry, under the Union Government of India, on 31 March 2016.

Sindhudurg Ratnagiri Mahakokum Sanstha from Malvan, proposed the GI registration of Sindhudurg & Ratnagiri Kokum. After filing the application in March 2014, the Kokum was granted the GI tag in 2016 by the Geographical Indication Registry in Chennai, making the name "Sindhudurg & Ratnagiri Kokum" exclusive to the Kokum grown in the region. It thus became the first Kokum variety from India and the 13th type of goods from Maharashtra to earn the GI tag.

The prestigious GI tag, awarded by the GI registry, certifies that a product possesses distinct qualities, adheres to traditional production methods, and has earned a reputation rooted in its geographical origin.

== Cuisine ==
The cuisine of the district is popularly known as Malvani cuisine. Coconut, rice, and fish feature prominently in Malvani cuisine. Seafood, particularly Bangada, Paplet, prawns, and Tisrya, is very popular. Kombdi Vade, also called Vade Sagoti, a chicken savory, is the most popular dish. Others include Ukadya Tandulachi Pej (उकड्या तांदळाची पेज – a semi-fluid boiled brown-red rice Congee preparation) and Solkadhi (सोल कढी – A preparation made of sol (kokum) सोल and coconut milk). Dry fish is also a local delicacy – varieties include Sungata and Golma which are both dried prawn preparations.

Malvani cuisine differs from cuisines in the rest of Maharashtra, with dishes prepared using locally available spices and generally with little oil. Some popular Malvani dishes include

- Kombadi Vade or Vade Sagoti (कोंबडी वडे thick puris made of rice flour)
- Ghavane – ras (घावने – Rice dosa with sweet coconut milk)
- Amboli – Usal (आंबोळी उसळ – fermented rice dosa with spicy curry)
- Shirvale (शिरवाळे – noodles served with sweet coconut milk)
- Dhondas (धोंडस)
- Fried fish and fish curry using Malvani spices
- Solkadi (सोलकढी)
- Khaprolya (खापरोळ्या)
- Malvani Ukadiche Modak (Steamed Modak)
- Malvani Khaja (खा)
- Nhevre/Karanjee (करंजी – Stuffed crunchy sweet delicacy)
- Olya Kajuchi Usal
- Pithi Bhat (पिठी-भात – Pithi is made of horsegram unlike the besan prevalent across the rest of Maharashtra)
- Ukdya Tandlachi Pej with
- Phanasachi bhaji (Jackfruit dish)

Mango is a major influence on the socioeconomic life of Sindhudurg. Alphonso Mango (हापुस आंबा ) varieties from Devgad are particularly popular. Other varieties of mango: Mankur (मानकुर), Goa Mankur, Keshar, Pāyari (पायरी), Karel (करेल – used for preparing Mango Pickle), and Rayval are also popular for their distinct taste. Jackfruit is also one of the most popular fruits of Sindhudurg.

Malvani cuisine also has many vegetarian dishes, including Garyache Sandan, Karmal pickle, Bimble, Amba Halad, Karadichi Bhakri, Kanyacha Sanja, Appe, Ghavan, Dalimichi Usual, and Kaju Usual, Raiwal Ambyacha Rayta, Yelapp.

== Places of attraction ==
=== Tourist destinations ===
- Amboli Hill Station Sawantwadi
- Sindhudurg Fort in Malvan
- Vijaydurg Fort Devgad
- Tarkarli Beach
- Nivati Rock (a lighthouse in deep sea), Nivati Beach
- Ganapati Temple, Redi
- Tilari Dam (Dodamarg)

=== Temples ===
- Kunkeshwar temple, Devgad
- Shri Dev Rameshwar Temple (16th Century) in Rameshwar, Girye-Vijaydurg

=== Beaches ===
- Maharashtra
- Shiroda
- Tarkarli
- Malvan
- Vijaydurg
- Rameshwar

== Officer ==
=== Members of Parliament ===
- Mr. Narayan Rane (BJP) Ratnagiri_Sindhudurg Constituency

=== Guardian Minister ===
==== list of Guardian Minister ====
Name	Term of office
Deepak Kesarkar	5 December 2014 – 8 November 2019
Uday Samant	9 January 2020 – 27 June 2022
Anil Parab Additional charge	27 June 2022 – 29 June 2022
Ravindra Chavan	24 September 2022- 26 November 2024
Nitesh Narayan Rane	18 January 2025- Incumbent

=== District Magistrate/Collector ===
==== list of District Magistrate / Collector ====
Name	Term of office
Ms. K. Manjulekshmi (IAS)	2018 – Incumbent
