= Malvan =

Malvan Malvan Beach
- town
- Location in Maharashtra, India
- Coordinates: 16°04′0.12″N 73°28′.1128″E
- Country: India
- State: Maharashtra
- District: Sindhudurg

Government
  - Type: Municipal Council
  - Body: Malvan Municipal Council
  - Mayor: Mahesh Kandalgaonkar
- Elevation: 5 m (16 ft)

Population (2011)
  - Total: 18,648
  - Rank: 1st in Sindhudurg
- Demonym: Malvani

Languages
  - Official: Marathi
  - Local: Malvani
- Time zone: UTC+5:30 (IST)
- PIN: 416606
- Telephone code: 91-2365
- Vehicle registration: MH-07
- Website: Malvan Beach

Malvan (also written as Malwan) is a town and taluka in Sindhudurg District, Maharashtra state, India.

== Geography and climate ==
Malvan is a town situated on the coast of Western India. Beaches in the area include Tarkarli Beach, Mobar Point, Chivla Beach, and Tondavali Beach.

== Demographics ==
Malvan is a Municipal Council city in the district of Sindhudurg, Maharashtra. Malvan City is divided into 17 wards for which elections are held every 5 years. As of 2011 India census, the Malvan Municipal Council has a population of 18,648 of which 9,663 are males while 8,985 are females as per report released by Census India 2011.

The population of children with age 0-6 is 1364 which is 7.31% of the total population of Malvan (M Cl). In Malvan Municipal Council, the female sex ratio is 930 against the state average of 929. Moreover, the child sex ratio in Malvan is around 876 compared to the Maharashtra state average of 894. The literacy rate of Malvan city is 93.00%, higher than the state average of 82.34%. In Malvan, male literacy is around 94.76% while the female literacy rate is 91.11%.

== Wildlife Sanctuary ==
The Malvan Marine Wildlife Sanctuary was declared on 13 April 1987, with a core zone of 3.182 km^{2} and buffer zone of 25.94 km^{2} (total area being 29.122 km^{2}).

== Gallery ==
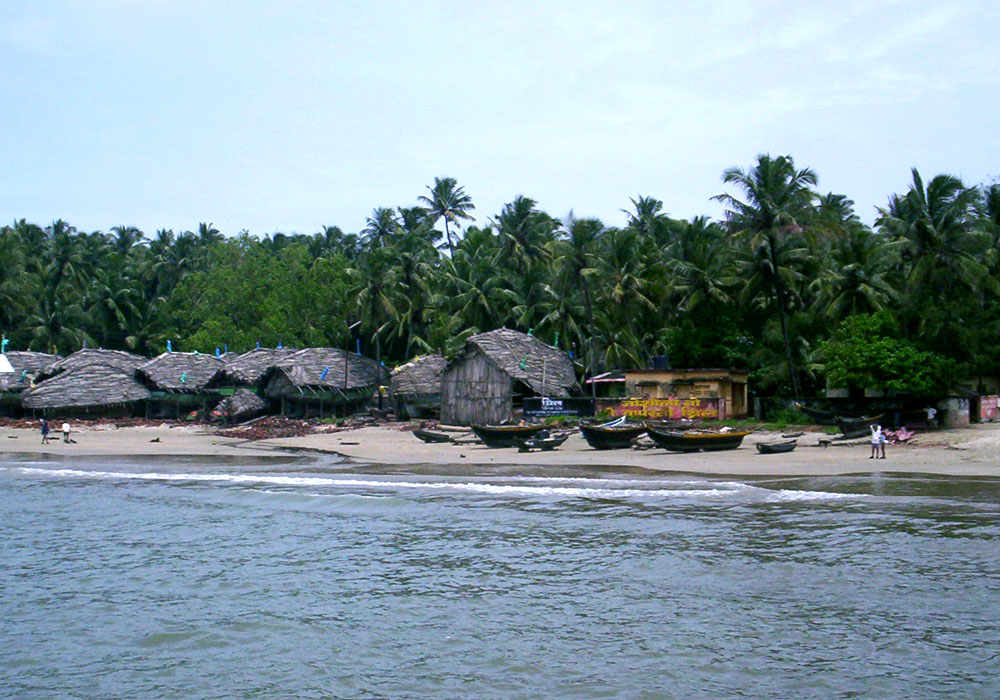
Malvan Beach

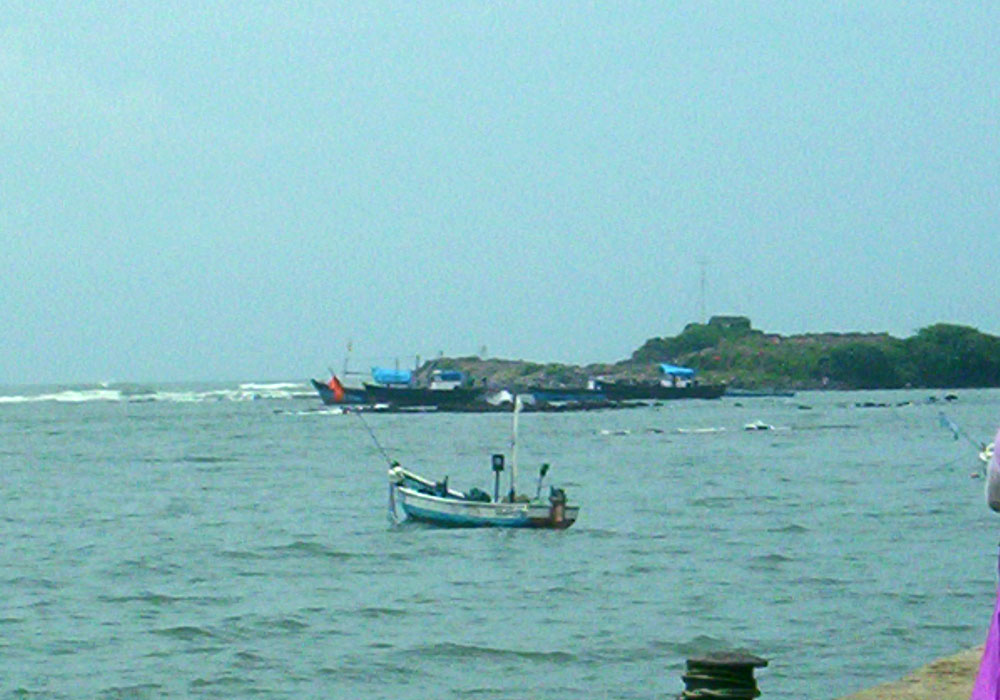
Malvan Beach

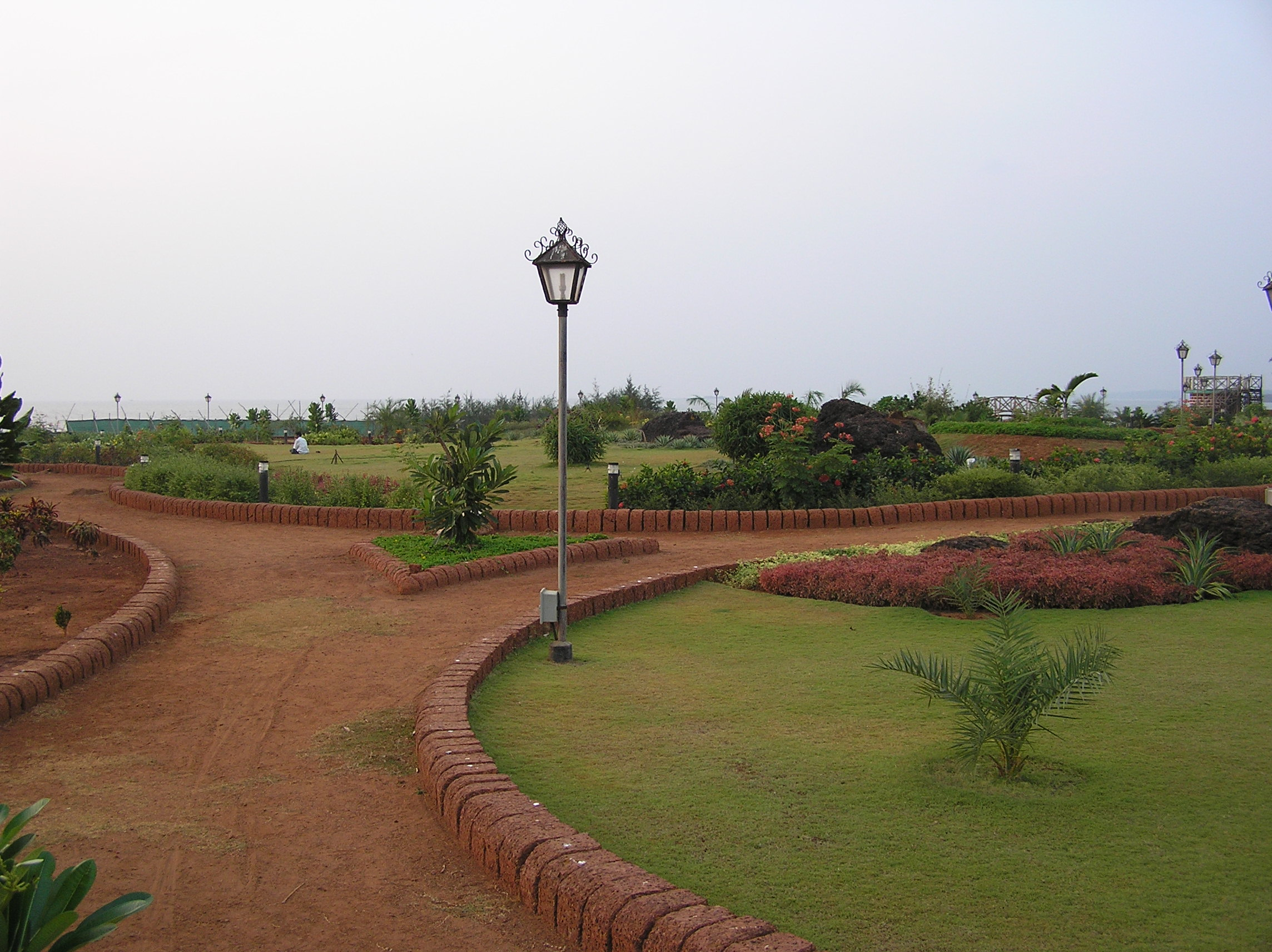
Malvan Rock Garden

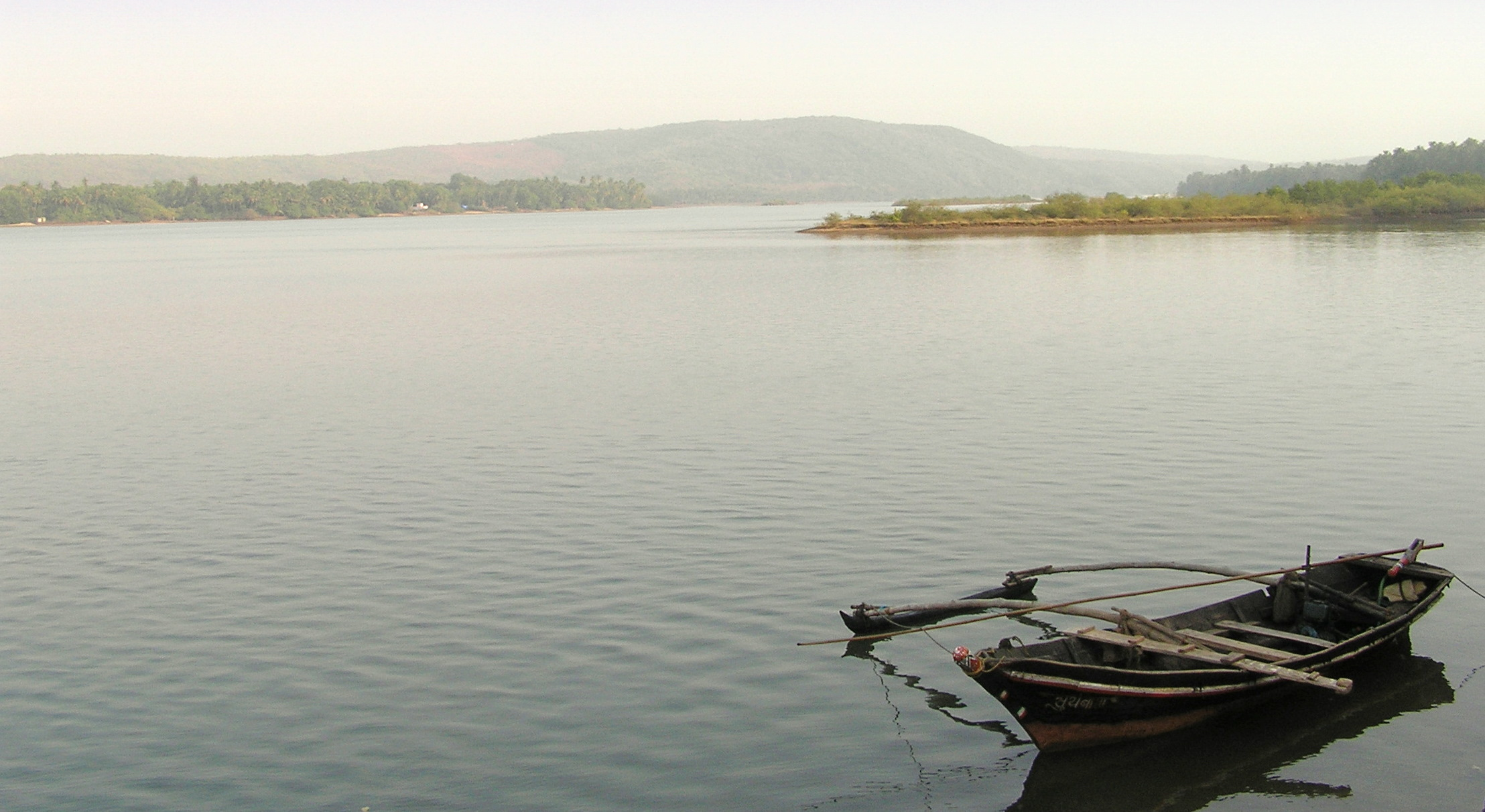
Devbaug Backwaters

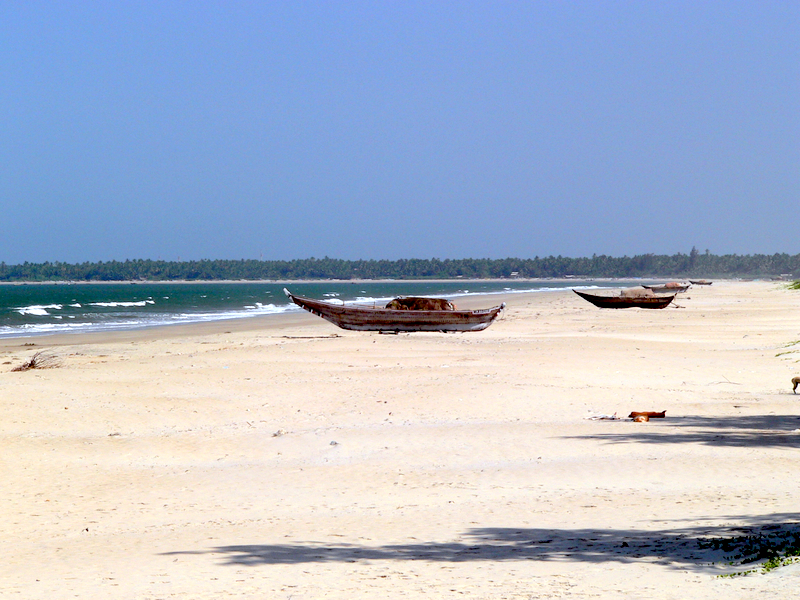
Tarkarli Beach
