= Malvani =

Malvani may refer to:

- Malvani people, people from the Malvan region of Maharashtra, on the Konkan coast of western India
- Malvani language, a dialect of Konkani, with heavy influence from Marathi
- Malvani cuisine, cuisine of the Malvan region, within Indian cuisine

== See also ==
- Malvan region, region of Maharashtra, India
  - Malvan, town in the Malvan region of Maharashtra, India
  - Malvan taluka, a taluka in the Sindhudurg district of Mahrashtra, India, covering the town and within the region
