= Malvani cuisine =

Cuisine of South Konkan, India

Malvani cuisine is the standard cuisine of the South Konkan region of the Indian states of Maharashtra and Goa. Although Malvani cuisine is predominantly non-vegetarian, there are many vegetarian dishes. Although it is an independent cuisine, it overlaps Maharashtrian cuisine and Goan cuisine. Malvan is a town in the Sindhudurg district on the west coast of Maharashtra.

Malvani cuisine uses coconut liberally in various forms such as grated, dry-grated, fried, coconut paste and coconut milk. Many masalas have dried red chilies and other spices like coriander seeds, peppercorns, cumin, cardamom, ginger and garlic. Some dishes also use kokum, dried kokam (amsul), tamarind, and raw mango (kairi). The Malvani masala, a form of dried powder masala, is a combination of 15 to 16 dry spices. This masala is coarsely ground and stored in jars to be utilized when required. However, not all of the cuisine is hot and spicy; the Konkanastha Brahmin style of food is an example of less spicy food.

Fish dishes dominate Malvani cuisine. Solkadhi is a pink-colored drink made from the kokam fruit (Garcinia indica) and coconut milk.

== Dishes ==
=== Main course ===
- Kombdi vade (कोंबडी वडे), or chicken Malvani, originated from malvan consists of the traditional Malvani chicken curry (including chicken pieces with bones), vade (like a puri, which is a fluffy, fried bread of Jowar or rice and lentils flour), onion, lemon, and solkadhi.
- Mori masala (मोरीचां मटण) or shark curry is popular along the Konkan coast.
- Solkadhi (सोलकढी) is an appetizer made from coconut milk and kokam. It is usually served with kombdi vade, fish, and mutton Malvani.
- Bangda fry (तळलेलो बांगडो) is a popular dish, especially in Mumbai. The head of the bangda (mackerel) fish is removed and discarded and the other part is fried as a whole.
- Malvani mutton curry (मटणाचो रस्सो) is a popular dish throughout the Konkan region. It is similar to Chicken Malvani except that the spices are slightly different.
- Kavda curry (कवड्याचो मटण) is made from a local Konkani bird, Kavda (Spotted dove).
- Bombil fry or Bombay duck fry (तळलेलो बोंबिल) is a popular dish, especially in north Konkan regions such as Mumbai, Palghar and Raigad.
- Paplet saar (पापलेट सार) is a dish consisting of pomfret cooked in traditional Malvani fish curry.
- Phanasachi bhaji (फणसाची भाजी) is a vegetarian dish, made from raw jackfruit, chilies and grated coconut.
- Kajuchi or fakachi usal (काजुची किंवा फकाची उसळ) is a spicy curry of cajus (cashews).
- Prawn curry (कोळंब्यांचा रस्सा)
- Kolambi fry (तळलेली कोळंबी) is a common dish of prawns marinated in spices and rolled in a mixture of rice flour and semolina before frying.
- Kalya vatanyancha samara (काळ्या वाटाण्यांचा सामारा) is a black pea curry made using coconut and Malvani masala.

=== Breads and cakes ===
- Dhondas (धोंडस) or cucumber Cake is a baked preparation made from big ripe cucumber, coarse rice flour, grated coconut and jaggery.
- Ghaavane (घावणे) is a pancake made with rice flour and is popular in the Sindhudurg district.
- Khaproli (खापरोळी) is a sweet dish popular in southern Konkan. The dish consists of a fluffy pancake dipped in yellow sweet coconut milk.
- Tandalachi bhakri (तांदळाची भाकरी) is a bhakri made of rice flour. It is the Malvani equivalent of the Maharashtrian jowari bhakri or bajri bhakri which is popular throughout the Deccan.
- Ambolya (आंबोळ्या) is a type of bread made from fermented batter of rice and udad daal, served with coconut chutney or usal (pulses gravy) or sweetened Coconut milk(रस).
- Shirvale (शिरवाळे) is a type of Noodles made with rice flour served with sweetened Coconut milk (रस).
- Ras-poli (रस-पोळी) is a sweet deep-fried preparation, highly popular in Maharashtra. The dish consists of a fried pancake served with sweetened coconut milk.
