= Sindhudurg and Ratnagiri Kokum =

Kokum variety grown in Maharashtra, India

Sindhudurg & Ratnagiri Kokum (रत्नागिरी आणि सिंधुदुर्ग कोकम)
- Geographical indication
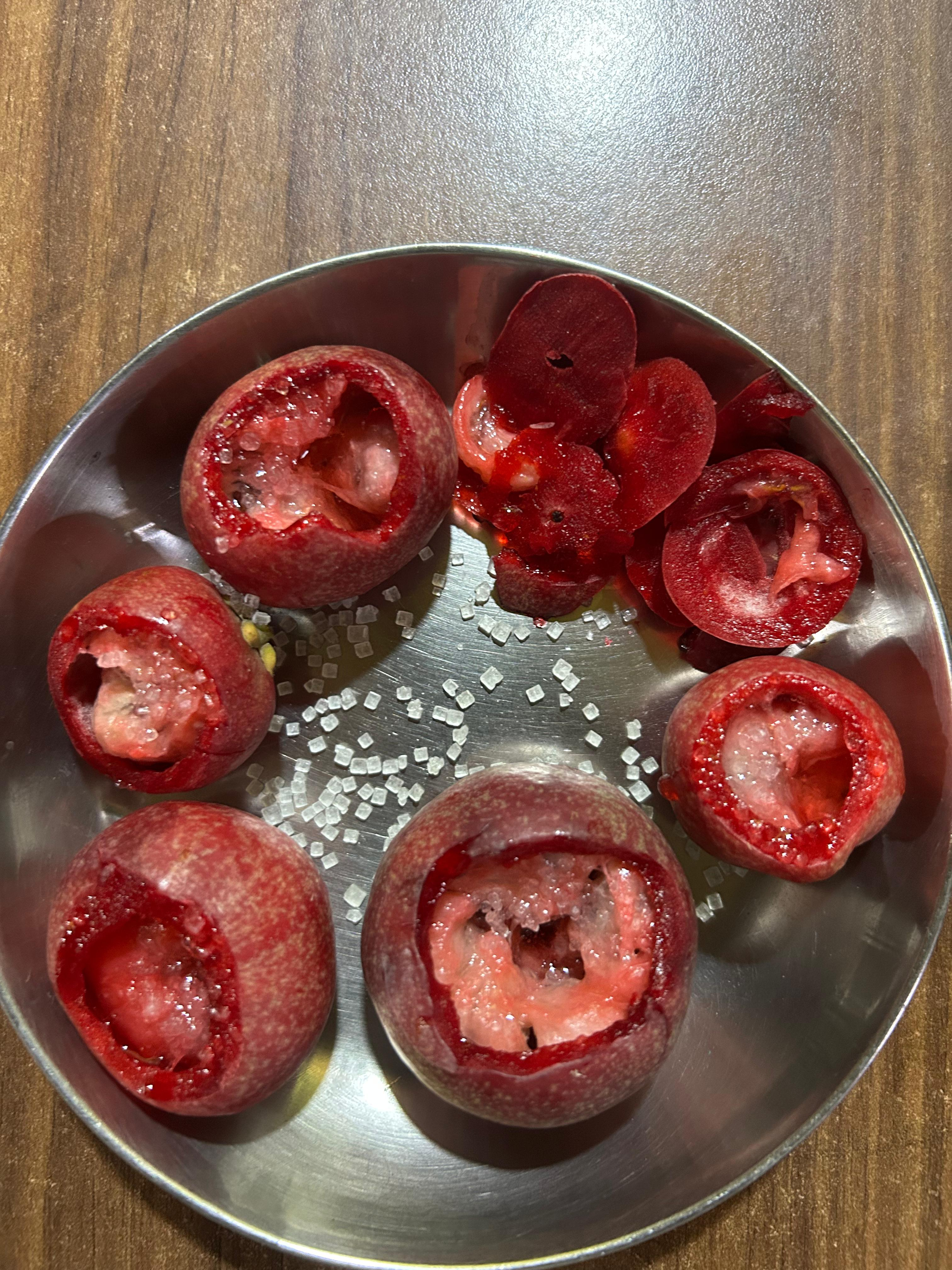
- Description: Kokum variety grown in Maharashtra, India
- Type: Kokum
- Area: Sindhudurg & Ratnagiri districts
- Country: India
- Registered: 31 March 2016
- Official website: ipindia.gov.in

The Sindhudurg & Ratnagiri Kokum (scientifically known as Garcinia indica) is a traditional fruit cultivated in the Indian state of Maharashtra. This variety is grown in abundance in Sindhudurg and Ratnagiri districts located in the coastal Konkan belt of the Western Ghats.

Under its Geographical Indication tag, it is referred to as "Sindhudurg & Ratnagiri Kokum".

== Name ==
The name "Sindhudurg & Ratnagiri" refers to its main region of cultivation.

== Description ==
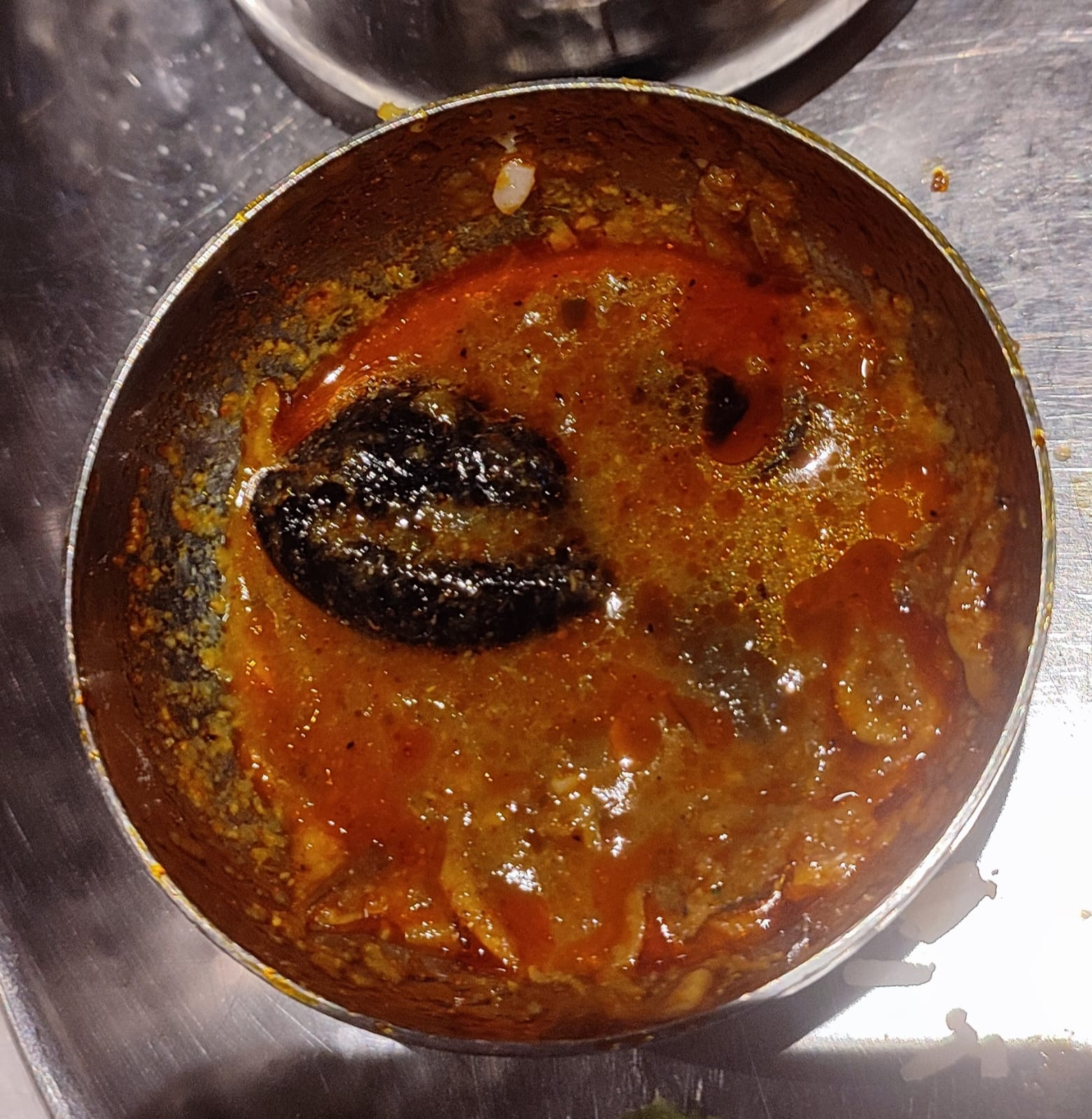
Dried Kokum rinds (dried outer skin of the Kokum fruit) used in Dried Baby Shrimp (Jawla) Curry

Kokum grown in Ratnagiri and Sindhudurg districts is known for its exceptional taste. This fruit has numerous medicinal applications, particularly in Ayurvedic medicines and cosmetics. Its value-added products, such as Lonawale kokum, kokum seed, and kokum butter, are in high demand. It is naturally rich in hydroxycitric acid helpful in weight-loss tablets.

Kokum is a staple ingredient in regional cuisines, especially in, Maharashtra, Goa and southern states - Karnataka, Kerala. In kerala, Kudamphuli also known as Garcinia Cambogia is used in Malabar Cuisine, which is similar to Kokum. Its souring qualities make it an excellent substitute for tamarind, enhancing coconut-based curries, vegetable dishes, and fish curries. As a key ingredient in Konkani cuisine, Kokum is used in various forms, including chutneys, pickles, and as a whole ingredient in dishes.

== Geographical indication ==
It was awarded the Geographical Indication (GI) status tag from the Geographical Indications Registry, under the Union Government of India, on 31 March 2016.

Sindhudurg Ratnagiri Mahakokum Sanstha from Malvan, proposed the GI registration of Sindhudurg & Ratnagiri Kokum. After filing the application in March 2014, the Kokum was granted the GI tag in 2016 by the Geographical Indication Registry in Chennai, making the name "Sindhudurg & Ratnagiri Kokum" exclusive to the Kokum grown in the region. It thus became the first Kokum variety from India and the 13th type of goods from Maharashtra to earn the GI tag.

The prestigious GI tag, awarded by the GI registry, certifies that a product possesses distinct qualities, adheres to traditional production methods, and has earned a reputation rooted in its geographical origin.

== See also ==
- Vengurla cashew
- Alphonso mango
- Goan cashew
