= Vengurla cashew =

Cashew variety grown in Maharashtra, India

Vengurla cashew (वेंगुर्ला काजू)
- Geographical indication
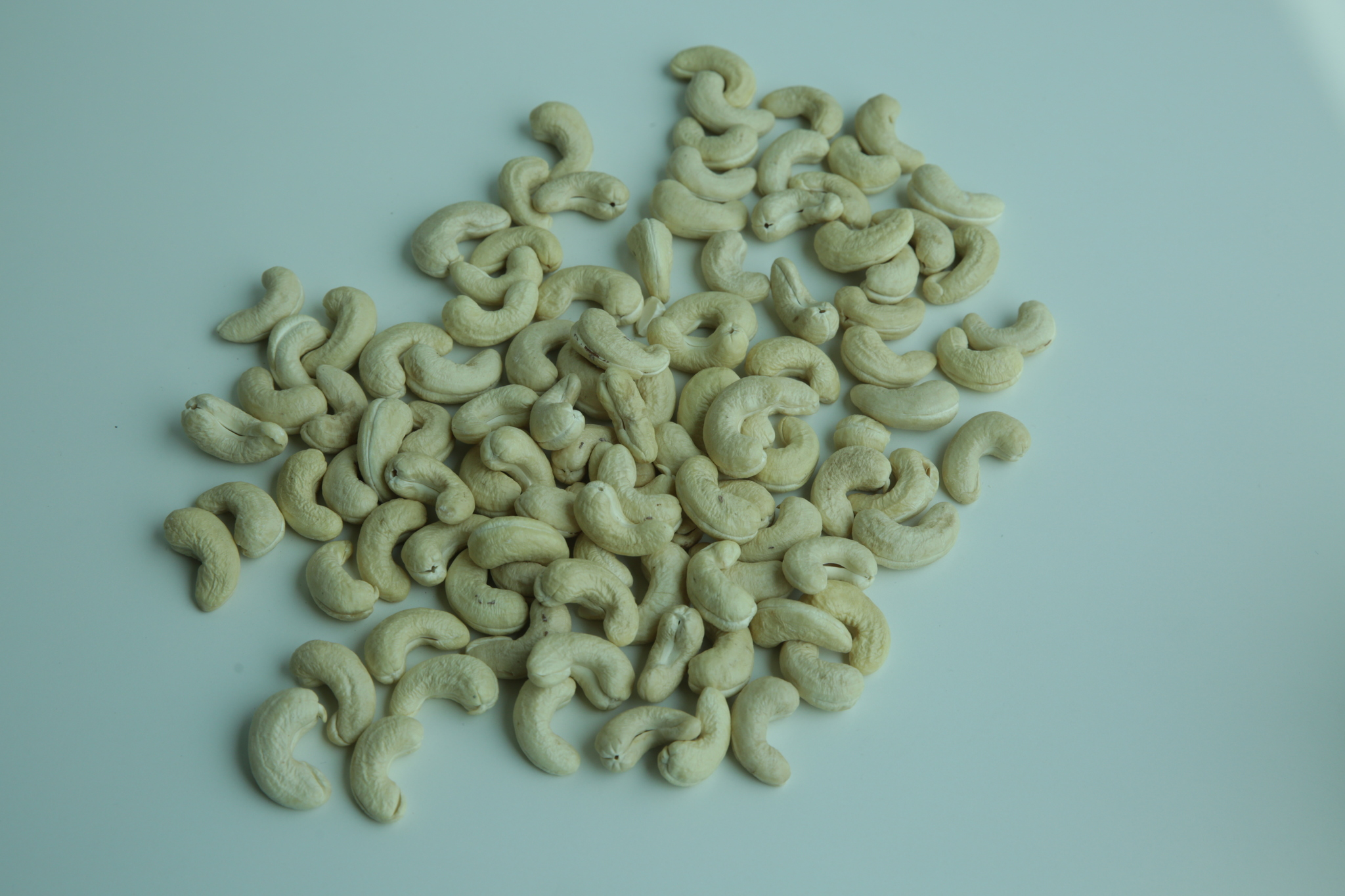
- Close-up of Vengurla-7 variety Cashews
- Alternative names: Vengurla Kaju
- Description: Cashew variety grown in Maharashtra, India
- Type: Cashew
- Area: Sindhudurg
- Country: India
- Registered: 31 March 2016
- Official website: ipindia.gov.in

The Vengurla cashew refers to the traditional variety of the cashew fruit grown in the Indian state of Maharashtra, which is one of the major cashew-growing Indian states. Vengurla cashew is a prized commercial horticulture crop in the Vengurla taluka of Sindhudurg district along with the other 7 talukas.

Under its Geographical Indication tag, it is referred to as "Vengurla Cashew".

== Name ==
The name "Vengurla" refers to its main region of cultivation - the tehsil of Vengurla with top cashew-producing villages of Math, Vetore, Banda, and Mochemad.

== Description ==
Vengurla's cashews has a scientifically proven nutritional value, with an impressive five-fold higher vitamin C content compared to oranges. The uniform environment in Sindhudurg district's eight tehsils has led to significant cashew production, particularly with the Vengurla Cashew variety. Introduced by the Portuguese in the 16th century to prevent soil erosion, cashew cultivation began in Goa and gradually spread to the Konkan coastline in the current Sindhudurg district and Malabar region of Kerala. India has approximately 650,000 hectares of land dedicated to cashew cultivation, with 150,000 hectares in Maharashtra. Sindhudurg district is the largest producer of cashews due to its favorable climate.

The first cashew-processing unit was established in Vengurla in 1920, marking the beginning of a thriving industry in the region. The Regional Fruit Station in Vengurla, established in 1957, developed the Vengurla Cashew varieties (V1-V7). These varieties have distinct characteristics, including high juice content (86% in V5 and V7), best shelling (V2 variety with 32% shell thickness), and high nut yield (24 kg mean nut yield per tree in V2 variety).

Vengurla is renowned for its diverse cashew products. Some notable examples include cashew syrup, which aids digestion and has a long shelf life; cashew apple squash, jam, and chutney; and cashew nut kernel, used in confectionery and bakery products. The region is also famous for its traditional Indian sweets, such as Kaju Barfi and Kaju Modak, which are highly sought after during festivals and special occasions along with being the main ingredient of the popular spicy Kaju curry.

== Photo Gallery ==
Actual photos from Vengurlekar Farms, Jambhavade village, Kudal, Sindhudurg.

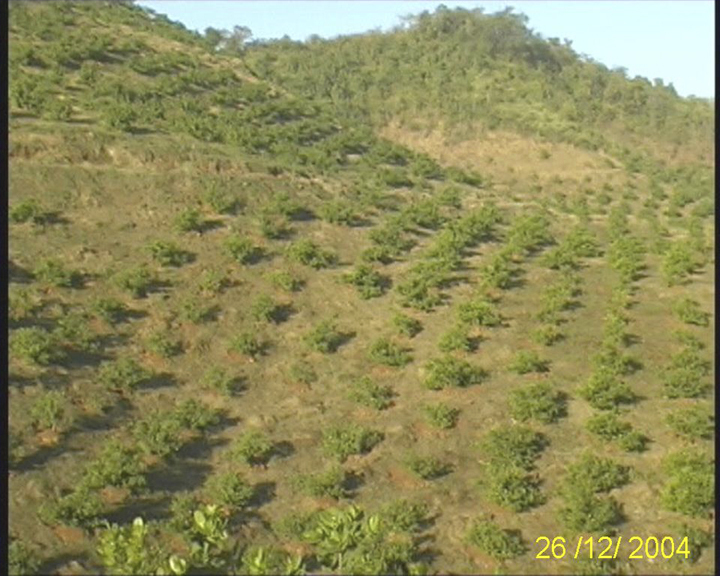
Aerial view of a Vengurla cashew farm

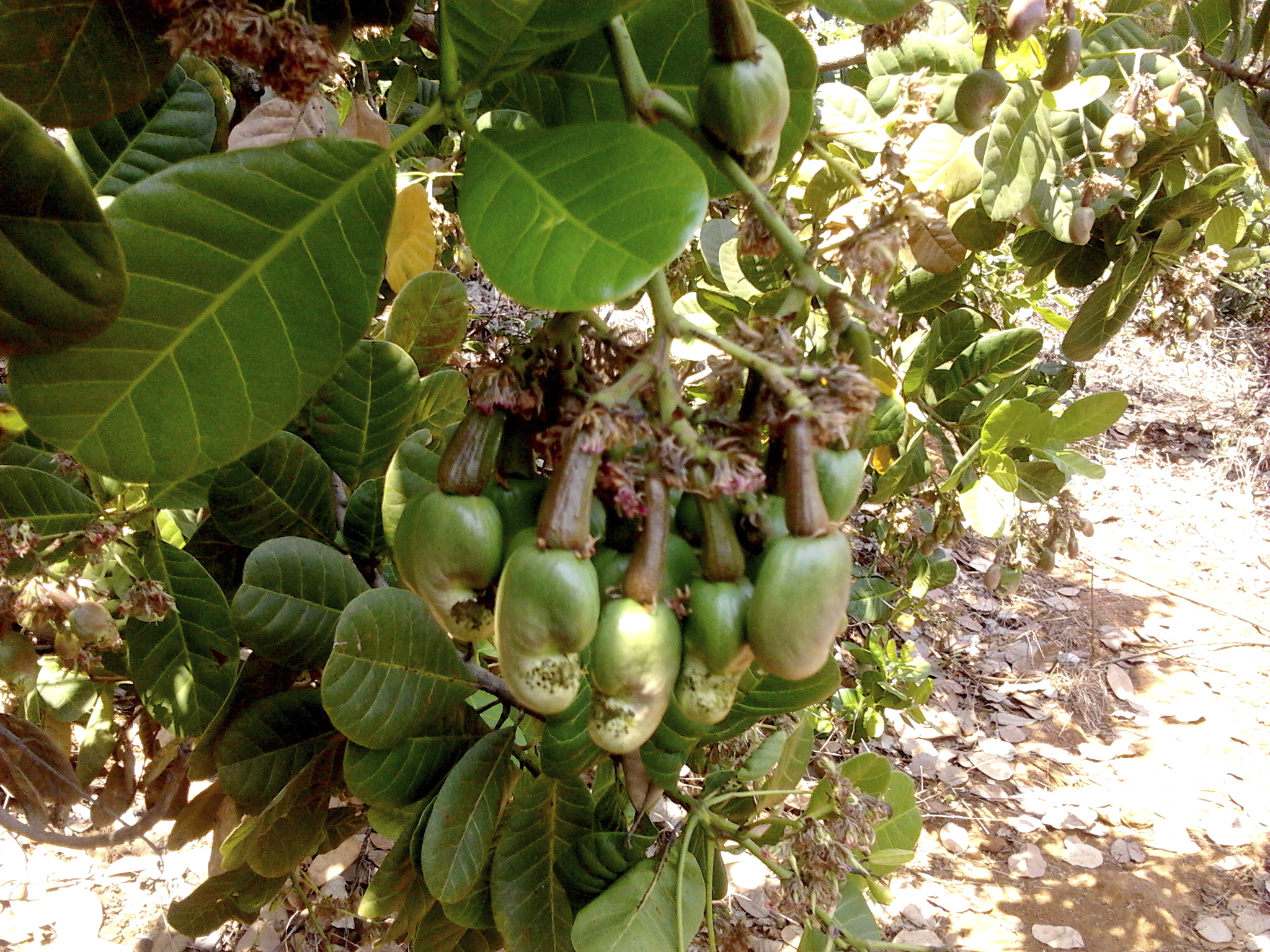
Bunch of unripe Vengurla-7 variety cashews

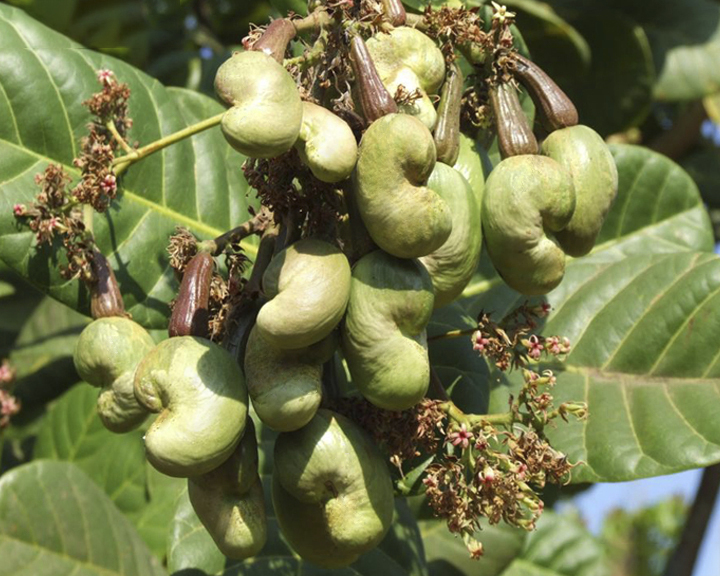
Another photo of Bunch of unripe Vengurla-7 variety cashews

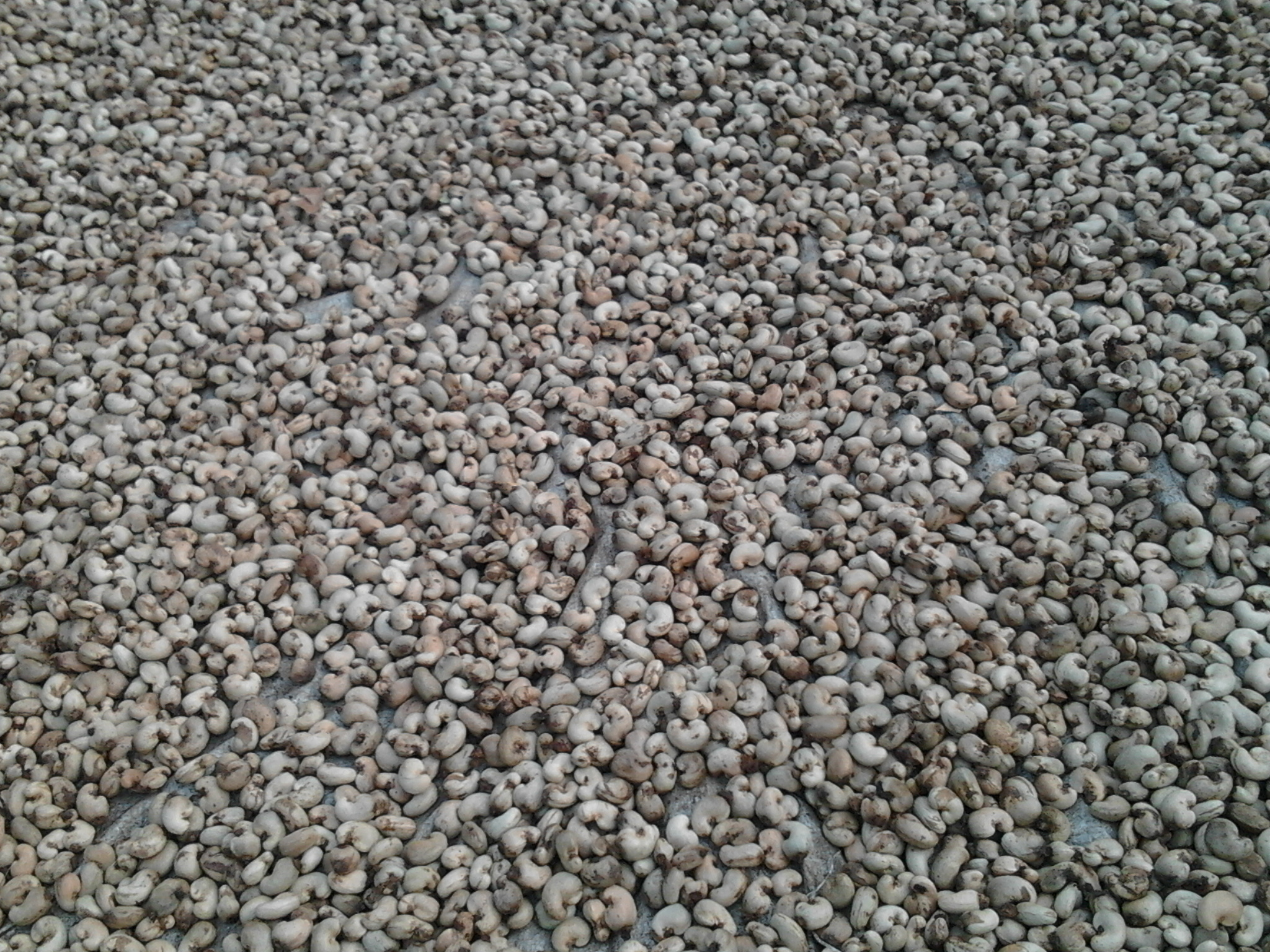
Close-up for Vengurla Cashews spread out for drying

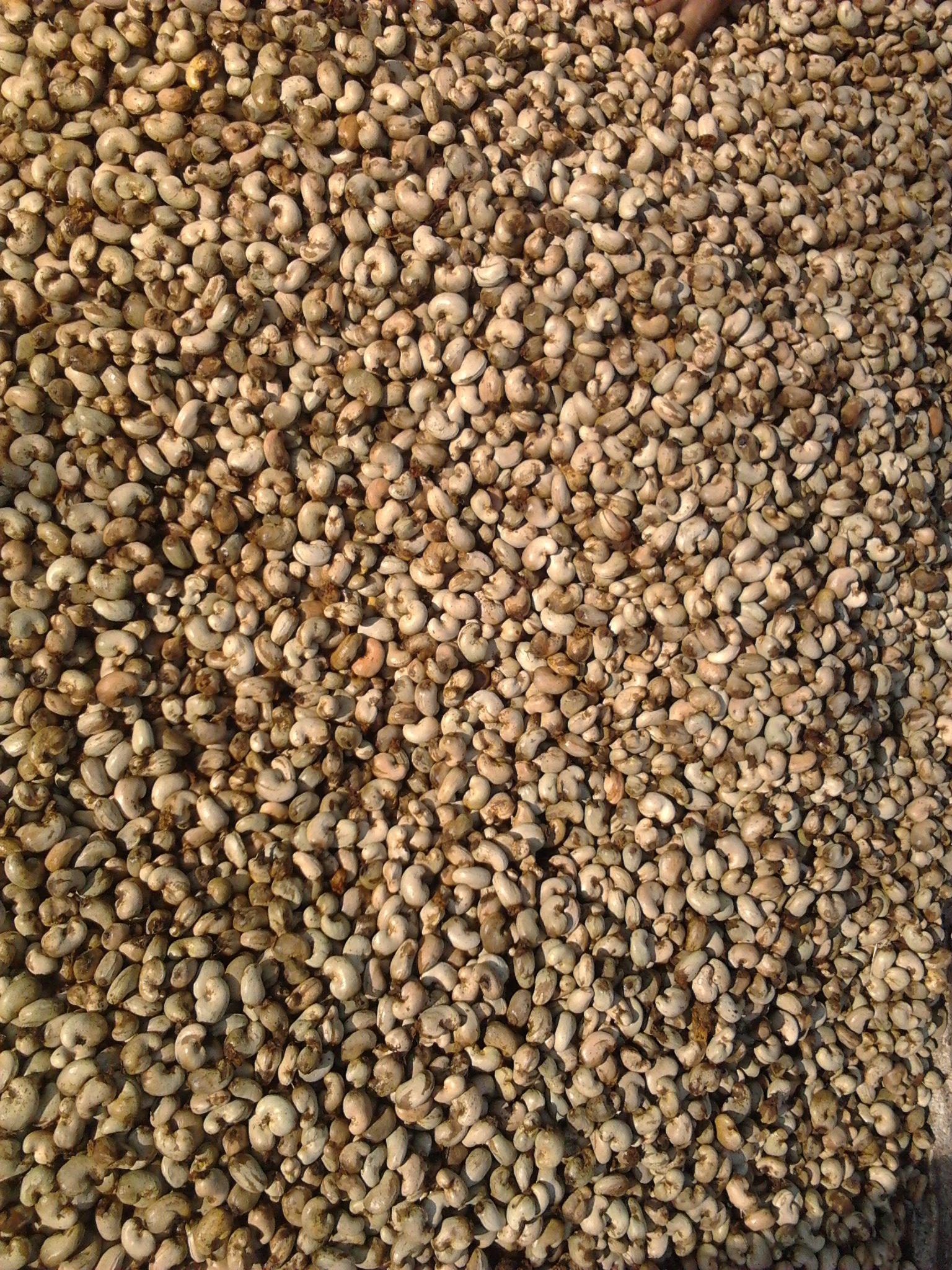
Another photo of Close-up for Vengurla Cashews spread out for drying

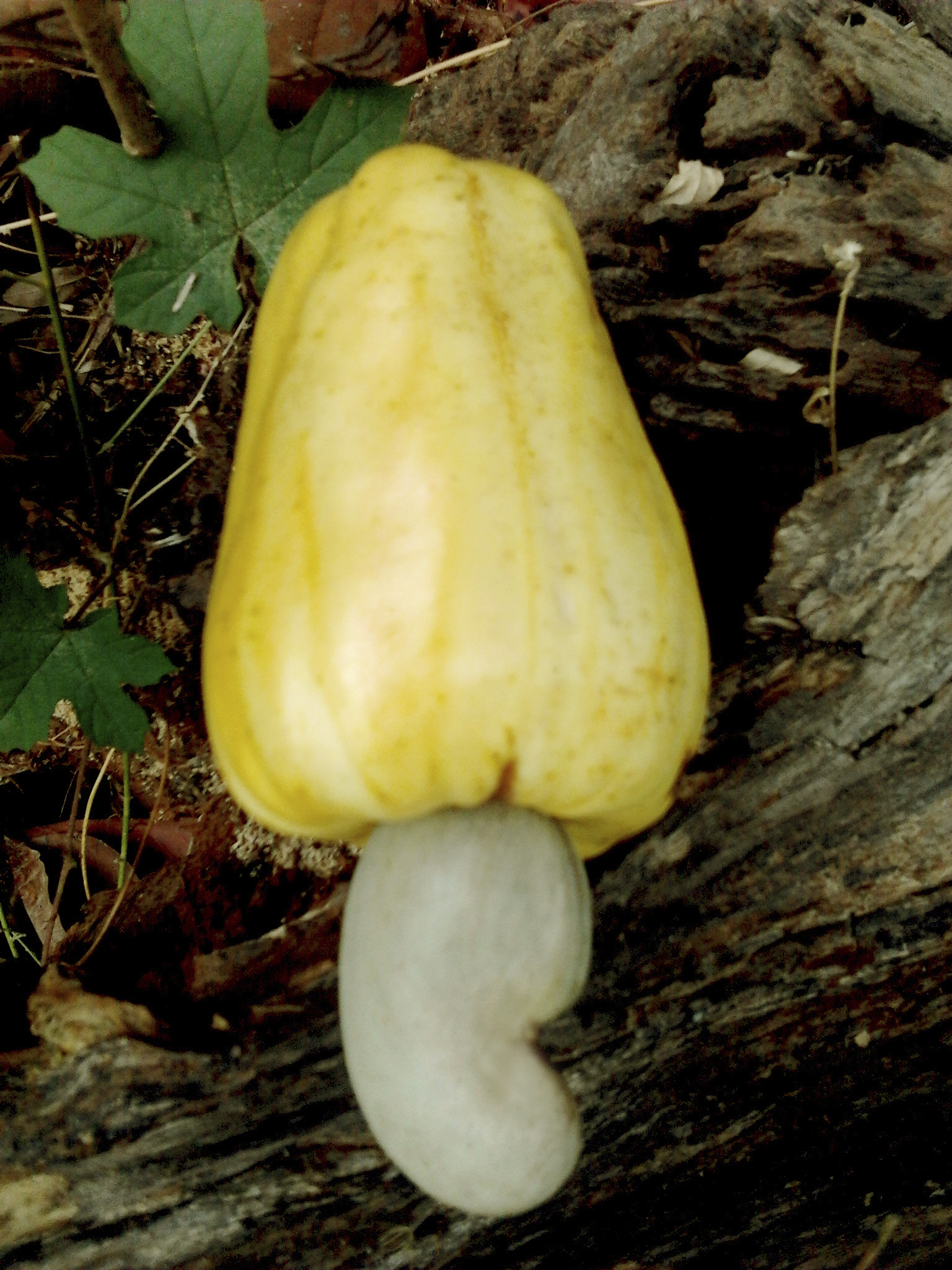
Close-up of ripe Vengurla-7 variety Cashew fruit with nut

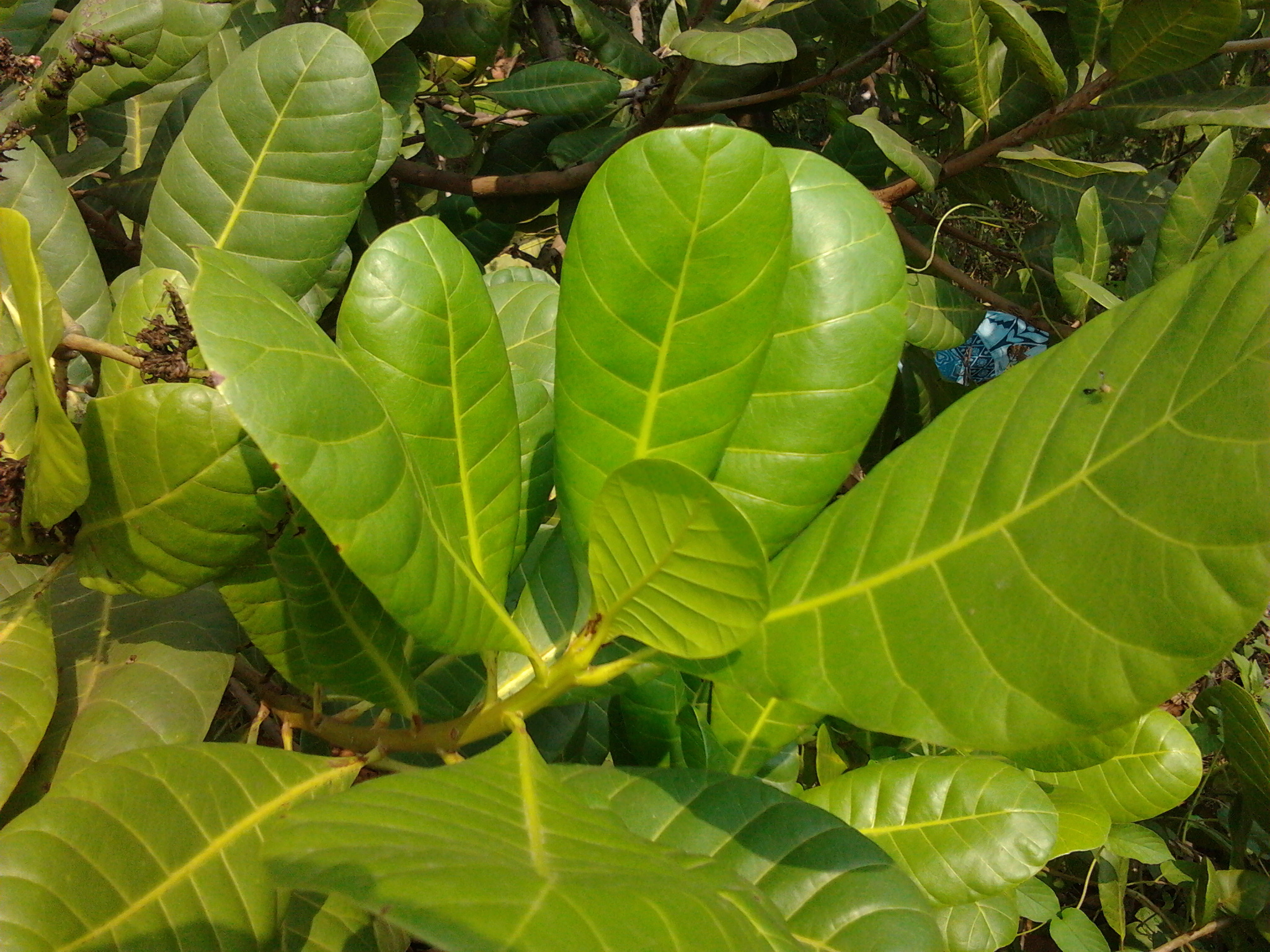
Close-up of Vengurla Cashew leaves

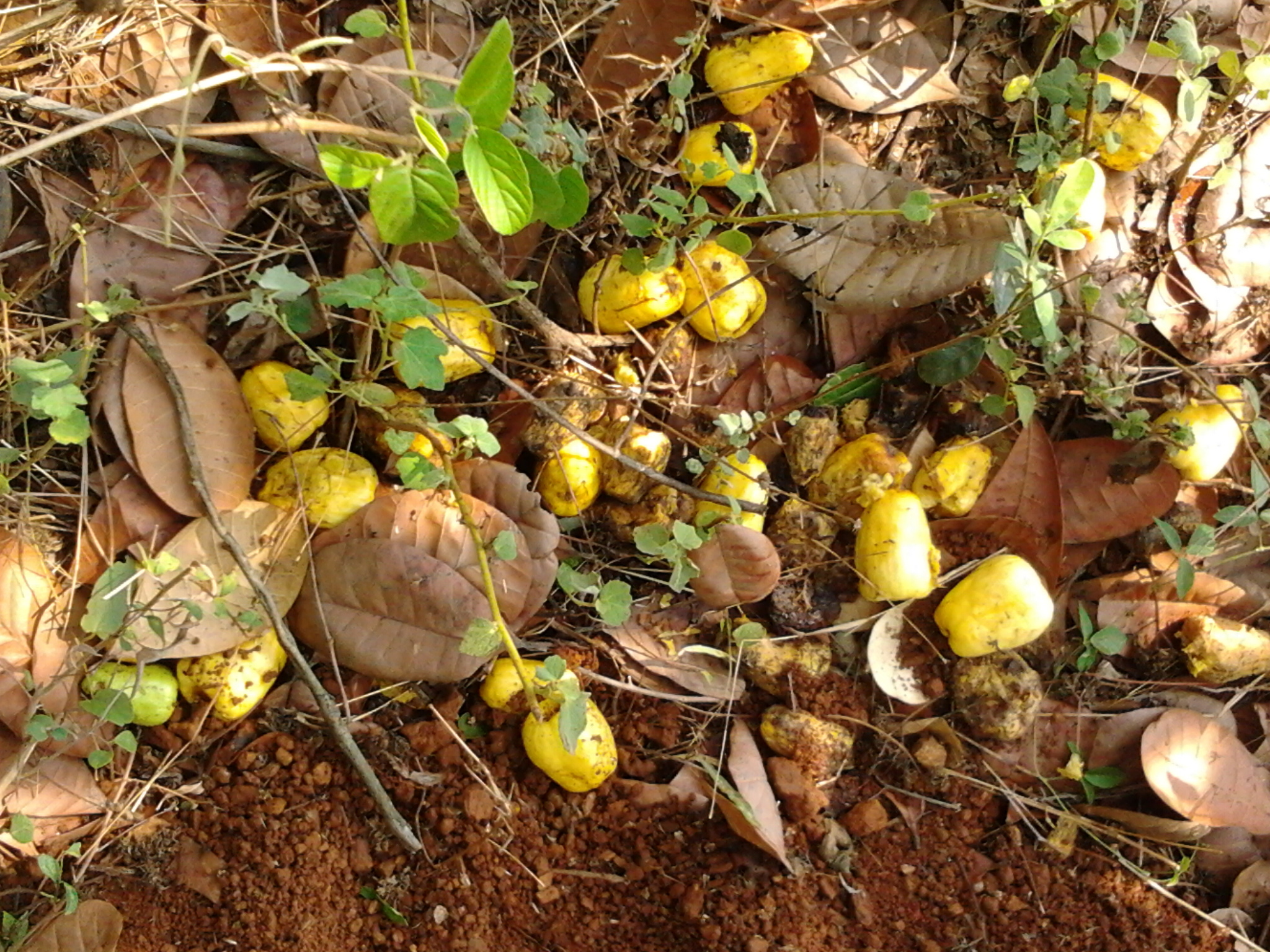
Ripened cashew fruits and nuts that have fallen from the trees

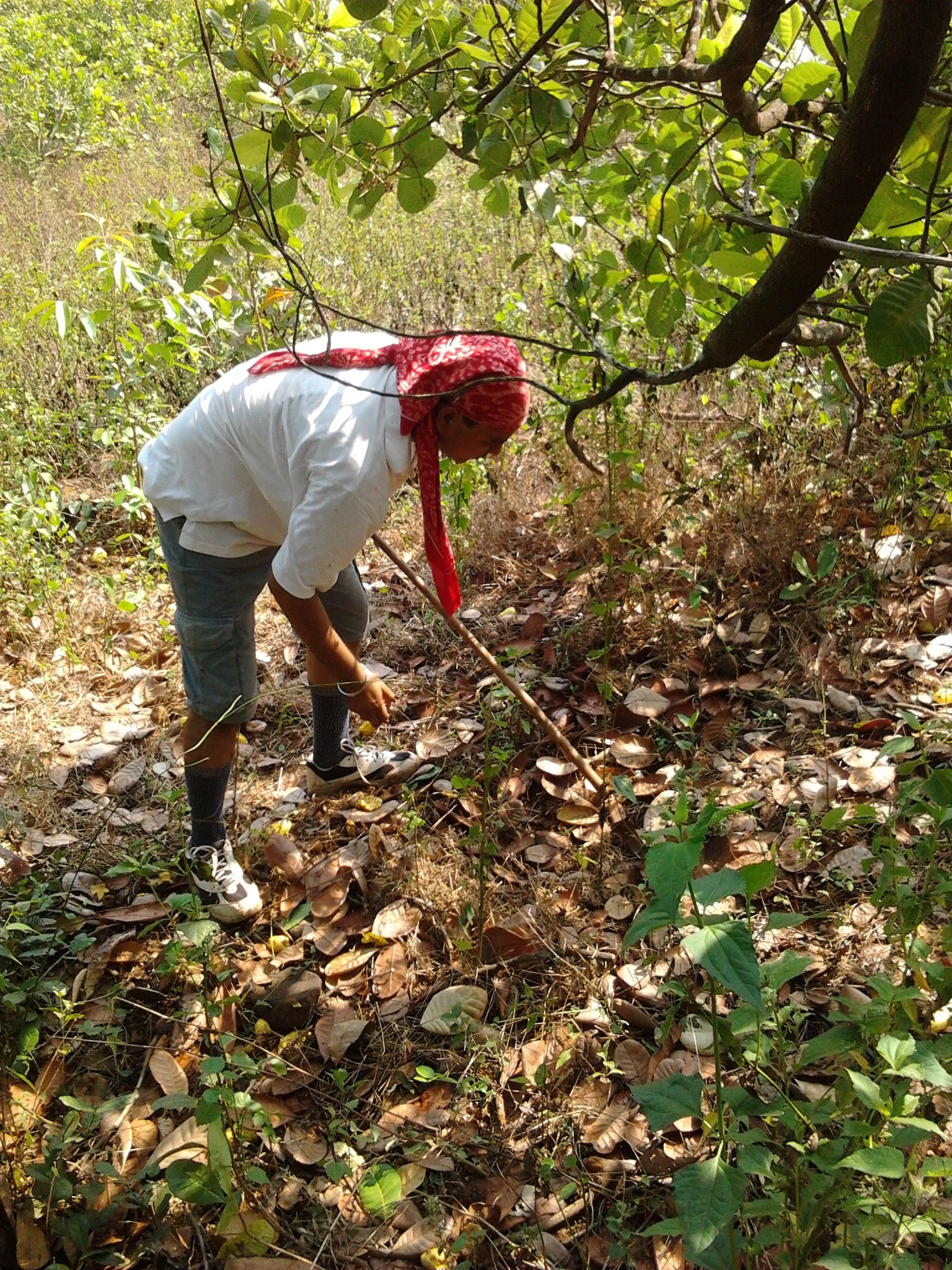
Farm harvestors gathering the ripened cashew fruits and nuts that have fallen from the tree

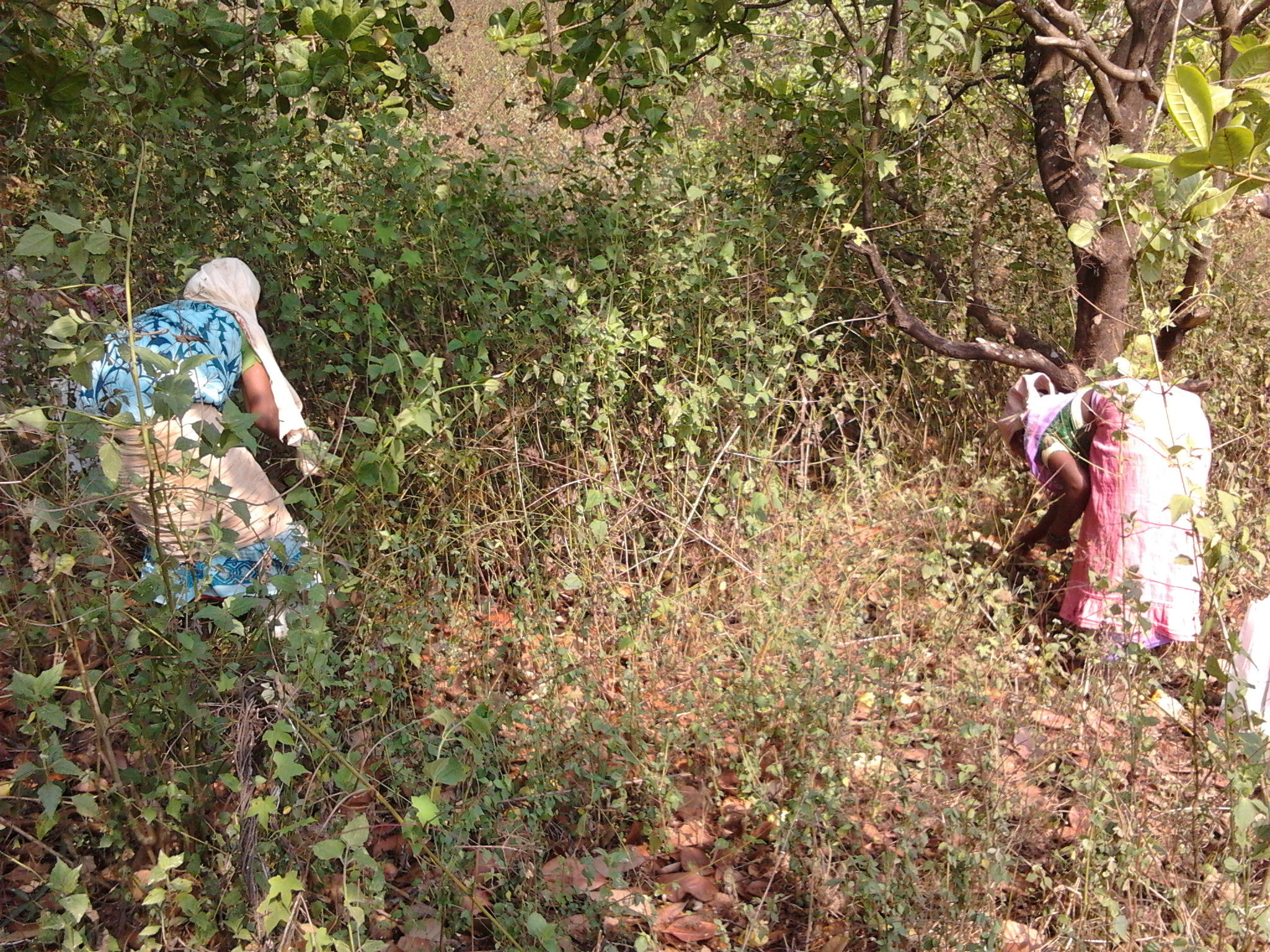
Another photo of Farm harvestors gathering the ripened cashew fruits and nuts that have fallen from the tree

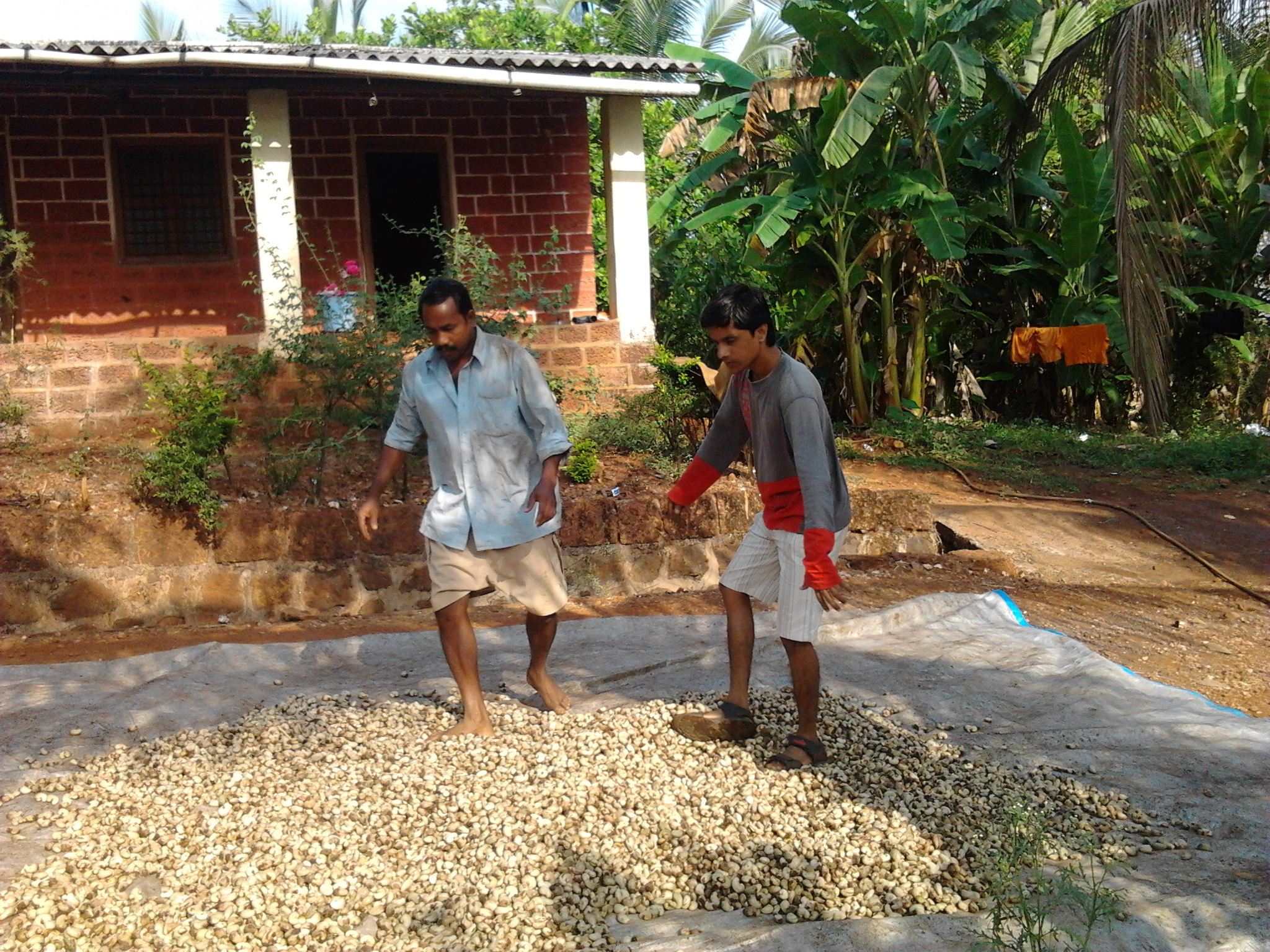
Farm workers spreading out Vengurla cashews in the Sun for drying

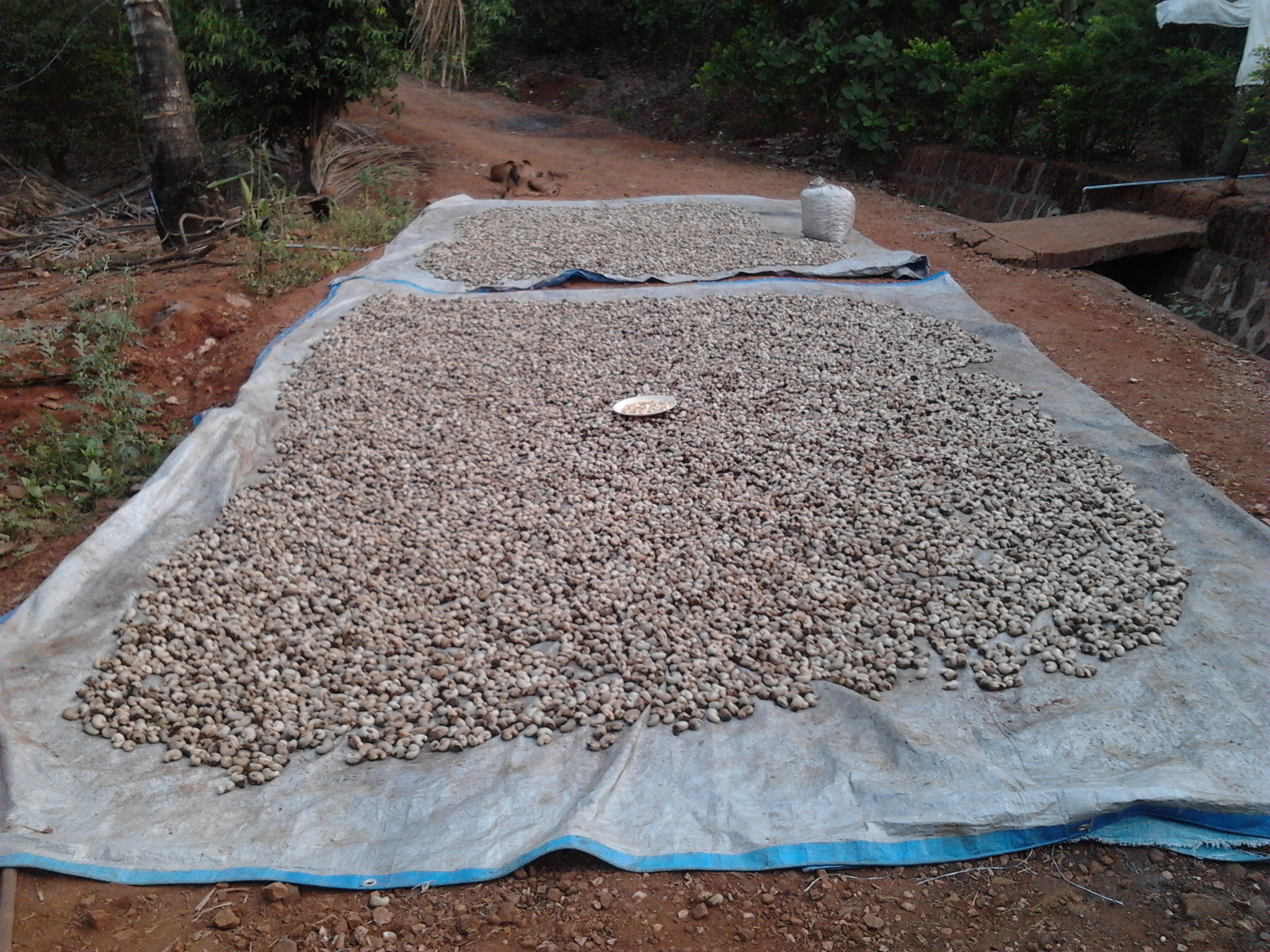
Vengurla cashews laid out in the sun for drying

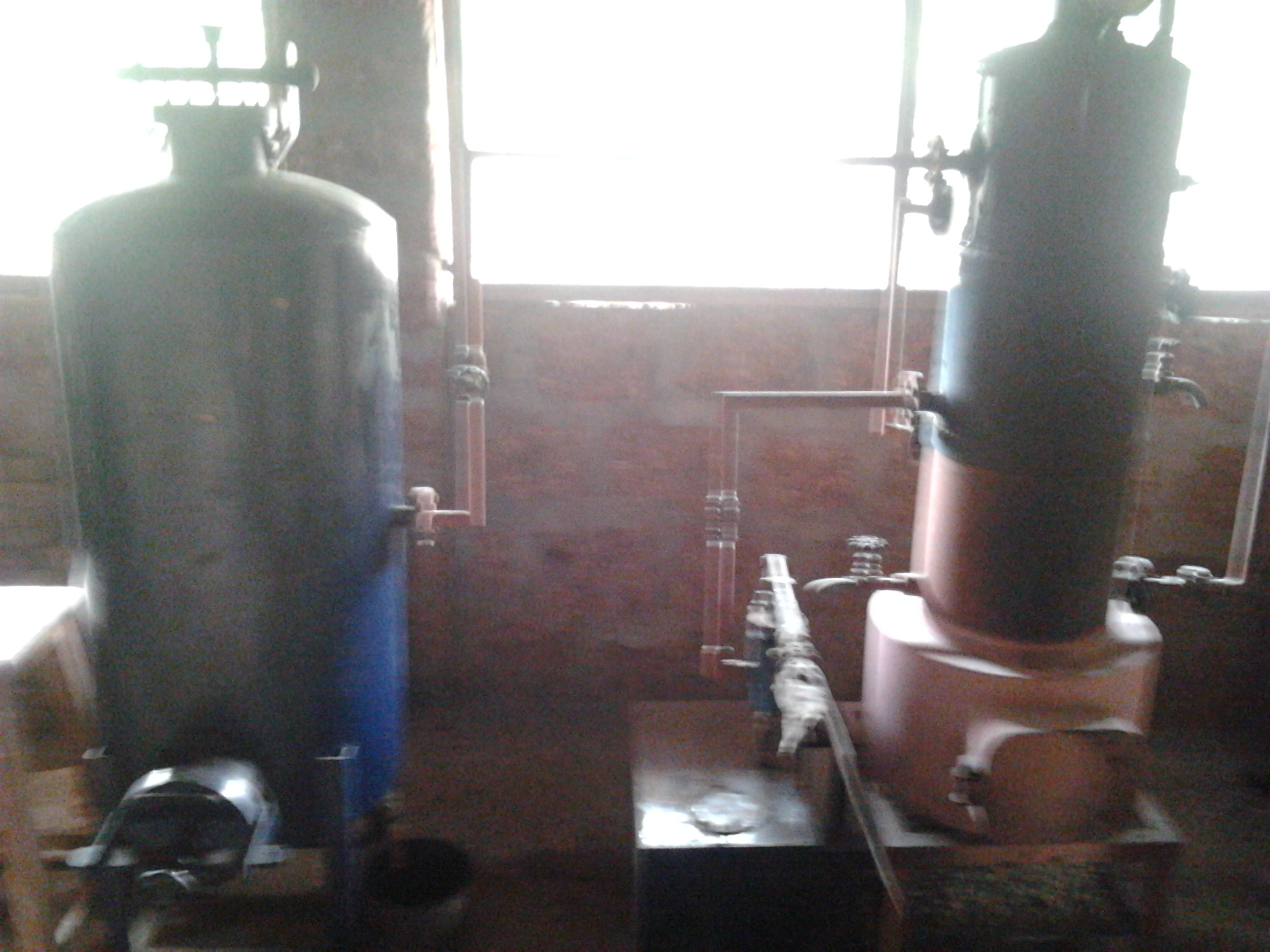
Cashew nut Cooking System

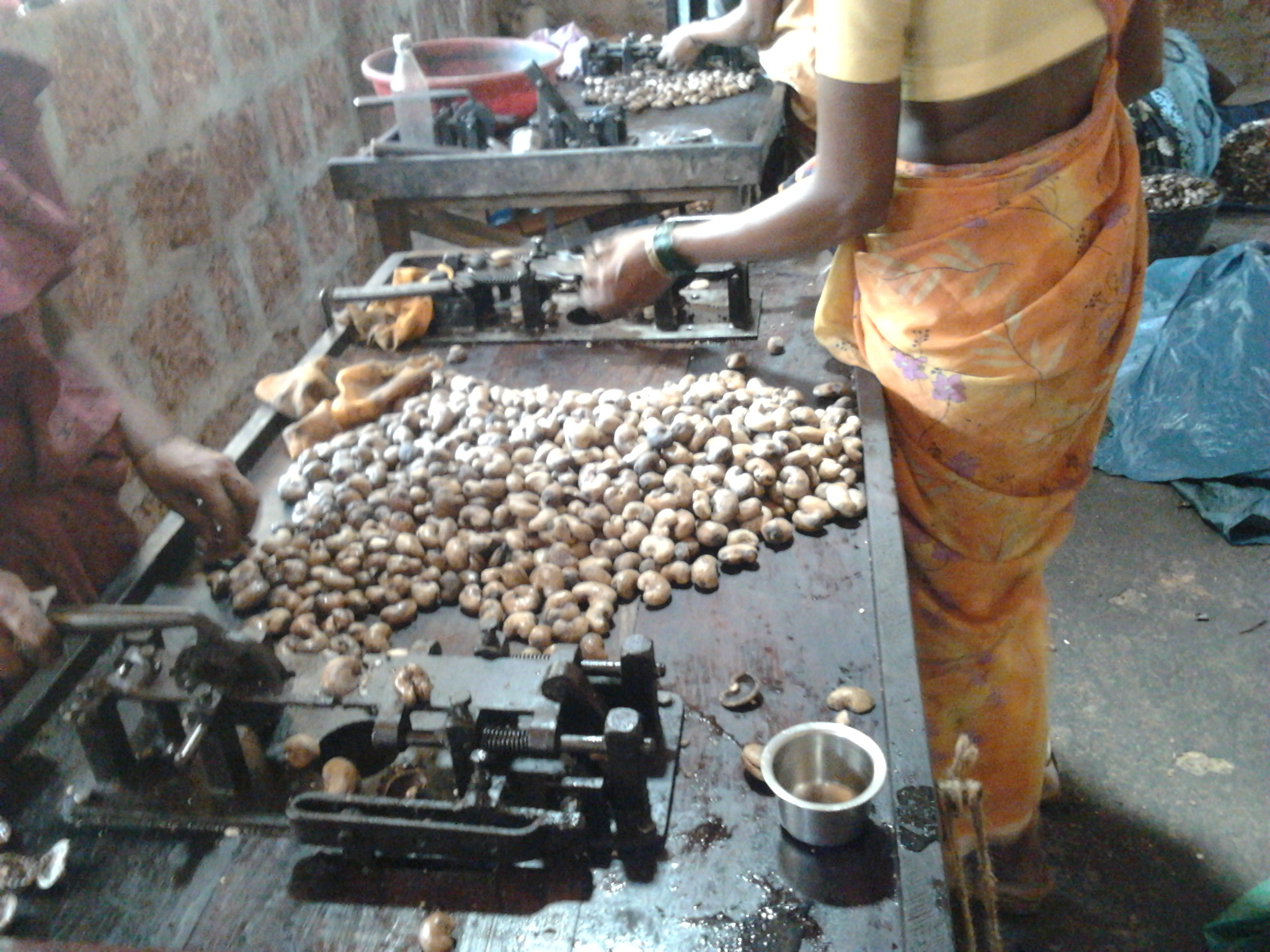
Factory workers engaged in deshelling, scooping, and kernel separation of cashew nuts

== Geographical indication ==
It was awarded the Geographical Indication (GI) status tag from the Geographical Indications Registry under the Union Government of India on 31 March 2016 (valid until 27 July 2034).

Kokan Kaju Samuh from Kankavli proposed the GI registration of Vengurla cashew. After filing the application July 2014, the Cashew was granted the GI tag in 2016 by the Geographical Indication Registry in Chennai, making the name "Vengurla cashew" exclusive to the cashews grown in the region. It thus became the 1st Cashew variety from India before Goan cashew Cashew and the 16th type of goods from Maharashtra to earn the GI tag.

== See also ==
- Goan cashew
- Alphonso mango
- Sindhudurg and Ratnagiri Kokum
