= Bindin =

Bindin may refer to:

- A protein involved in the process of sea urchin fertilization, which is a form of species-specific recognition of the egg by the sperm.
- Garcinia indica, a plant in the Mangosteen Family (Clusiaceae)
