= Goa Mankurad mango =

Mango cultivar from Goa, India

Mangifera 'Goa Mankurad Mango'
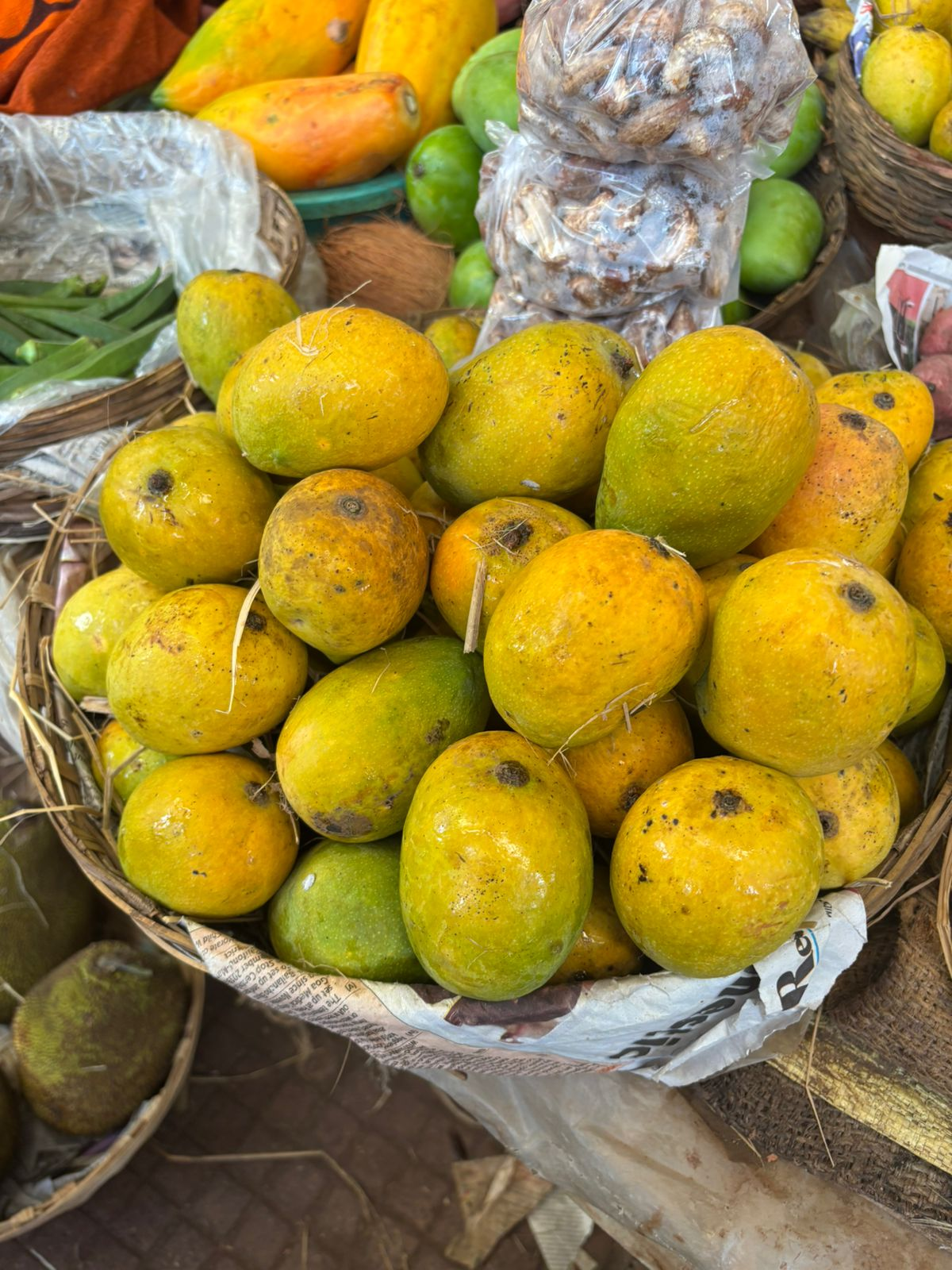
- Mankurad mangoes from Margao market
- Genus: Mangifera
- Species: Mangifera indica
- Cultivar: 'Goa Mankurad Mango'
- Origin: India

The 'Mankurad' mango, is a mango cultivar primarily grown in the coastal state of Goa, India. It is also cultivated in Vengurla and Malvan talukas of Maharashtra along within Uttara Kannada district of Karnataka. Malcorado, Mancurad, Mankur, Kurad, Corado are variations of the same name. Mankurad varieties include the Cardozo Mancurad, Costa Mancurad, Gawas Mancurad, and Amaral Mancurad.

== Name ==
The Portuguese during their rule in Goa, named this mango as "Malcorado" meaning Poor coloured. The word "Mal" translates to "Bad" while "Cor" translates to "Colour" in the Portuguese language. With time, it became Mankurad aamo (mango) in the state language of Konkani.

== Description ==
This mango variety is a Goan summer staple, offering rich taste, and a small flat seed. Weighing 200-250 grams, it has an unifom yellow skin, rich pulp, and balanced sweetness.

== Geographical indication ==
It was awarded the Geographical Indication status tag from the Geographical Indications Registry under the Union Government of India. on 1 August 2023 (valid until 13 December 2030).

All Goa Mango Growers Association from Panaji, proposed the geographical indication (GI) registration of Goa Mankurad Mango. After filing the application in 2020, the fruit was granted the GI tag in 2023 by the Geographical Indication Registry in Chennai, making the name "Goa Mankurad Mango" exclusive to the mangoes grown in the region. It thus became the first mango variety from Goa and the 8th type of goods from Goa to earn the GI tag.

== See also ==
- List of mango cultivars
- List of Geographical Indications in India
- Goa Cashew (Kaju or Caju)
