= Dikval =

Village in Maharashtra

Dikwal
- Location
- Location within Maharashtra
- Coordinates: 16.122924°N 73.610907°E
- Country: India
- State: Maharashtra
- District: Sindhudurg
- Taluka: Malvan

MAP
- Interactive map of MAP
- Village: Dikwal
- Founder: Not Known

Area
  - Land: 560 ha (1,400 acres)
  - Rural: 560 ha (1,400 acres)
- Time zone: UTC+05:30 (IST)
- Postal code: 416603

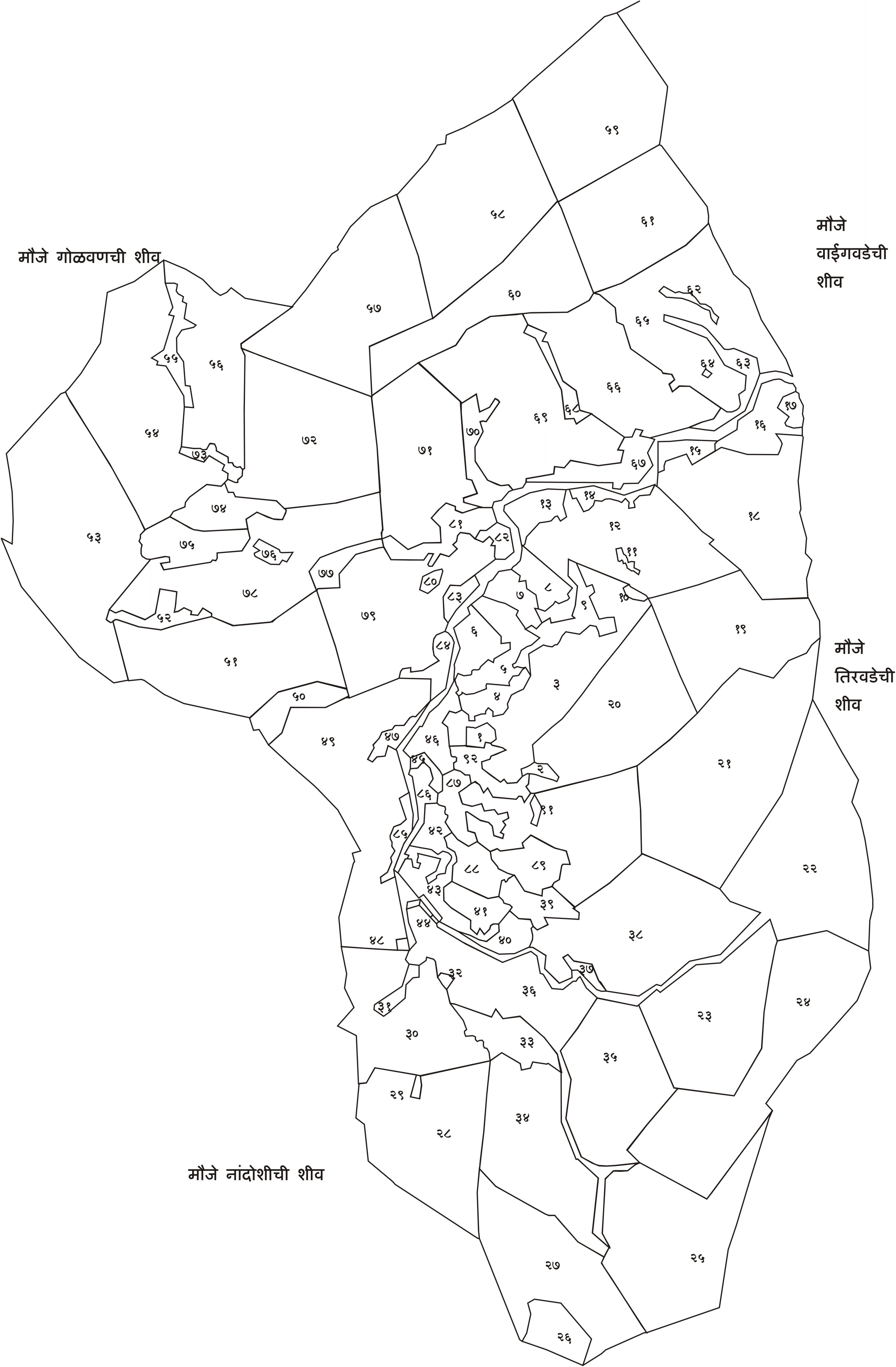
Dikwal Map

Dikval or Dikwal is a village in Golvan-Kumame panchayat, Malvan taluka in the district of Sindhudurg, Maharashtra, India, about 10 kilometres (6.2 mi) from the Arabian Sea. In 2011 it had a population of 325. Its total area is about 560 hectares. The local spoken language is Malvani.

The village land supports excellent crop-growing, including pineapples.

== Origin of the name ==
This village had a large area of water, so it was muddy, and while walking in this area mud used to stick to the legs, so the area was named dik which means "gum" (sticky glue) and wal meaning "wet". In this way, the area is known as Dik-wal, i.e. Dikwal.

In another explanation, as per the old and official record, the village of Dikwal had plenty of the plant called dinda. In front of the temple of the local deity Gangeshwar, villagers traditionally played a game called bhavai on every day of the new moon. They used to dig deep in soil where a man sat with a coconut in his hand and others were taken away or snatched away and then went to be washed in the stream. Then they came back to play a game, the beginning of the religious rituals, called dindwal, i.e., a game played with the stalks of the dinda plant, a group of which was called dindwan, which became Dindwal, then Dikwal.

== History, economy, education, religion ==
The village started developing in 1971, when the government started to look after it, with the efforts of villagers. Villagers were able to build roads which helped to develop transport facilities. Now students can go to school with State Transport Bus (MSRTC).

The nearest railway station is Sindhudurg railway station, situated on the route of the Konkan Railway. This station area is also known as Oras.

Villagers residing in this village are all farmers. Rice is a primary crop and supporting crops are taken with gardening, i.e. plantation. Most of the people work in a city like Mumbai, Pune, or Delhi. Some of them are doing business. Most of them visit their native place in the month of May, a month of hot summer when in India it is a holiday for school students.

Education is also one of the reasons which make people move to the cities. The school at Dikwal teaches up to 4th standard. For further studies, students have to walk more than one and a half hours to Katta, on the way to Malwan via Kasal, where they can study up to twelfth standard. The nearest market to Dikwal is also in Katta.

In the month of December, the villagers perform a festival for the worship of God called Dahikalo. On this occasion all villagers come together to enjoy the celebration. Dahikalo is a drama based on happenings in the life of God. Different stories are performed in the front of the temple on a permanent stage built for this purpose.
