= Kombdi vade =

Indian curry dish

vade sagoti
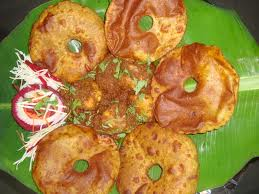
- Type: Curry
- Place of origin: India
- Region or state: Maharashtra
- Main ingredients: Curry chicken, vade (rice or other flour), onions, lemon juice, solkadhi (coconut milk)

Kombdi vade is a dish native to the Konkan region in the Indian state of Maharashtra. The dish consists of a traditional chicken curry (including chicken pieces with bones), vade (fluffy fried dumplings made of rice flour, and occasionally of wheat and Ragi flour), onions, lemon juice and solkadhi (a gravy made from coconut milk). This dish is majorly prepared on "Gatahari (Deep Amavasya)" "Gauri Ovase", "Dev Diwali" and "Shimga" in Raigad, Ratnagiri and Sindhudurg districts of Konkan. Generally this dish is available throughout the year especially in the coastal area of Maharashtra including Mumbai.
