= Kokum butter =

Oil from the seeds of the kokum tree

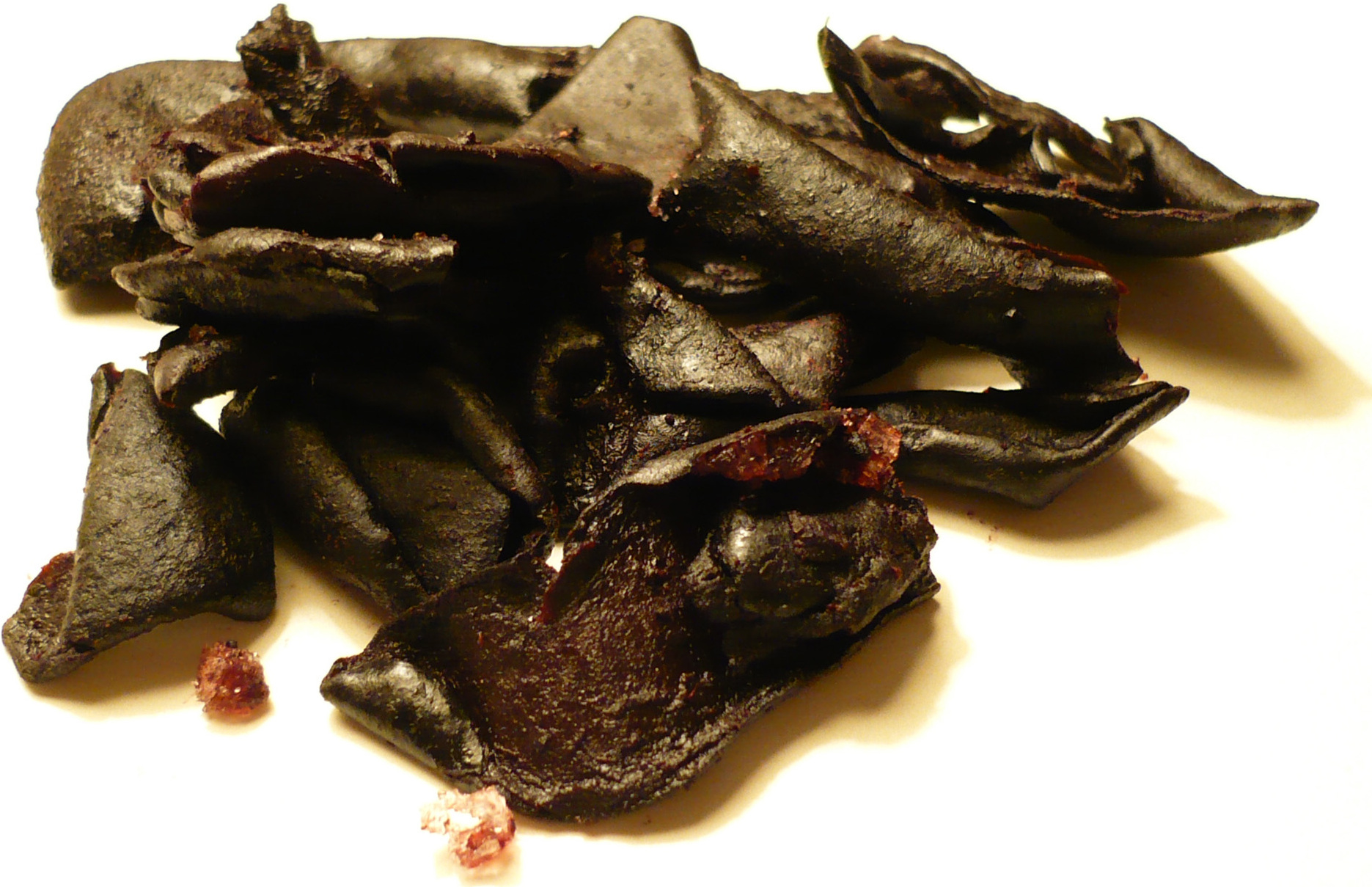
Dried fruit

Kokum butter as sold traditionally in the form of oblong ball

Kokum butter or kokum oil is a fat derived from the seeds of the kokum tree (Garcinia indica; also known as wild mangosteen or red mangosteen). Kokum butter is edible, but can also be used for things other than cooking.

Kokum fruits are collected for seeds from April to May. A tree yields 10–15 kilograms seeds, on average. The fruit contains 5 to 8 large seeds, compressed and embedded in an acidic pulp. The seeds account for 20–23% of the fruit's weight. The kernel accounts for 60% of the fruit's weight and 61% of the seed's weight. The oil content of the seeds is 23–26%. The oil content of the kernel is about 44% of the seed's weight. A kernel contains 41–42% oil and upto 17% protein.

== Collection of seeds ==
Fruits are collected manually by handpicking. The tree branches are shaken with long sticks and fallen fruits are collected. The fruits are broken by sticks to separate the seeds, which are picked up by hand. Then the separated seeds are dried to reduce their moisture content.

== Properties of oil ==
Kokum oil or kokum butter is light gray or yellowish in color. After refining, the kokum fat is equivalent to vanaspati ghee.

Property	Value
Appearance	Light pinkish white color
Odor	Characteristic kokum odor
Taste	Typical taste of kokum fat
Specific gravity	.898-0.914 g/cm^{3}
Slip melting point	34–40 °C
Iodine value	34–40
Saponification value	187–193
Unsaponifiable matter	1.2%
Moisture	0.25
Peroxide value	4.0 max

Kokum oil contains up to 60–65% saturated fatty acid, making it solid at room temperature, so this oil is known as kokum butter or kokum fat. Its triglyceride composition is uniform and consists of up to 80% of stearic-oleic-stearic (SOS) triglycerides. Because its slip melting point is close to human body temperature (37 °C), it tends to melt on skin contact.

Fatty acid composition of fat

Fatty acid	Percentage
Palmitic acid (C16:0)	2.0–8.0
Stearic acid (C18:0)	55–65
Oleic acid (C18:1)	30–44
Linoleic acid (C18:2)	0–8

== Uses ==
Kokum butter is non-greasy and gets absorbed into the skin once it is applied. It is often used as a substitute for cocoa butter due to its triglyceride composition. Kokum butter has emollient properties and good oxidative stability, which can assist emulsion integrity. With its relatively higher melt point, it melts slightly at skin temperatures, making it ideal for lipsticks and balms. It is also added in the making of bar soaps and skin lotions.
