= Goan cashew =

Cashew variety grown in Goa, India

Goa cashew
- Geographical indication
- Alternative names: Goa Kaju, Goa Caju
- Description: Cashew variety grown in Goa, India
- Type: Cashew
- Area: Goa
- Country: India
- Registered: 3 October 2023
- Official website: ipindia.gov.in

The Goan cashew refers to the variety of the cashew fruit grown in the Indian state of Goa, which is one of the major cashew-growing Indian states. In the entire state of Goa, the cashew crop spans approximately 55,302 hectares, yielding an estimated 27,070 tonnes annually. Goa Kaju or Goa Caju are variations of the same name.

Under its Geographical Indication tag, it is referred to as "Goa Cashew (Kaju or Caju)".

Goa cashew is the state fruit of Goa and is a prized commercial horticulture crop. Its exceptional kernel quality and inherently organic plantations make it highly sought after.

== Name ==
It is named after its place of origin, the state of Goa, located on the west coast of Goa while Kaju means Cashew - in the local state language of Konkani while Caju means the same in Portuguese language. The Portuguese brought it from Brazil to Goa, formerly Estado da Índia Portuguesa, between 1560 and 1565. From there, it spread throughout Southeast Asia and eventually Africa. It was introduced to Goa by the Portuguese approximately 450 years ago, was initially intended for soil conservation and wasteland development through afforestation. However, its significant economic value remained unrealized for nearly a century. It wasn't until 100 years after its introduction that the commercial potential of cashew nuts became apparent, gradually elevating its importance. The processing technology for Goa Cashew has a rich history, dating back around 350 years.

== Features ==
=== Physical characteristics ===
- Outer shell: Grey-colored, slightly fat
- Inner seed (Cashew Kernel/ Nut): Ivory white

=== Culinary significance ===
Goa Cashew nuts are an integral part of Goan cuisine, particularly in:

- Sweets and curry recipes
- Goa Biya Bhaji, a famous local dish
- Snacking, adding nutty crunch, texture, and flavor

=== Health benefits ===
Goa Cashew nuts provide:

- Substantial energy for health-conscious individuals
- Relief from recurring migraines due to Magnesium's relaxing effect on blood vessels

=== Unique features ===
- Taste
- Enjoyed plain or in recipes, savory to sweet
- Large size cashew nuts unique to Goa

=== Economic significance ===
- "Poor man's crop" and "rich man's favorite snack" globally
- Widely used in Goan culinary, including cashew apples for Feni production
- Supports foreign exchange through export, providing high returns to farmers

=== Tourist favorite ===
- Tourists visiting Goa ensure they buy Goa Cashew nuts before departing, making it a cherished souvenir.

== Geographical indication ==
It was awarded the Geographical Indication (GI) status tag from the Geographical Indications Registry under the Union Government of India on 3 October 2023 (valid until 25 October 2030).

Goa Cashew Manufactures Association (GCMA) from Panaji proposed the GI registration of Goa Cashew (Kaju or Caju). After filing the application on 26/10/2020, the Cashew was granted the GI tag in 2023 by the Geographical Indication Registry in Chennai, making the name "Goa Cashew (Kaju or Caju)" exclusive to the cashews grown in the region. It thus became the 2nd Cashew variety from India after Vengurla Cashew and the 10th type of goods from Goa to earn the GI tag.

== See also ==
- Goa Mankurad Mango
- Harmal chilli
- Khola chilli
