= Malvan region =

Region of Maharashtra

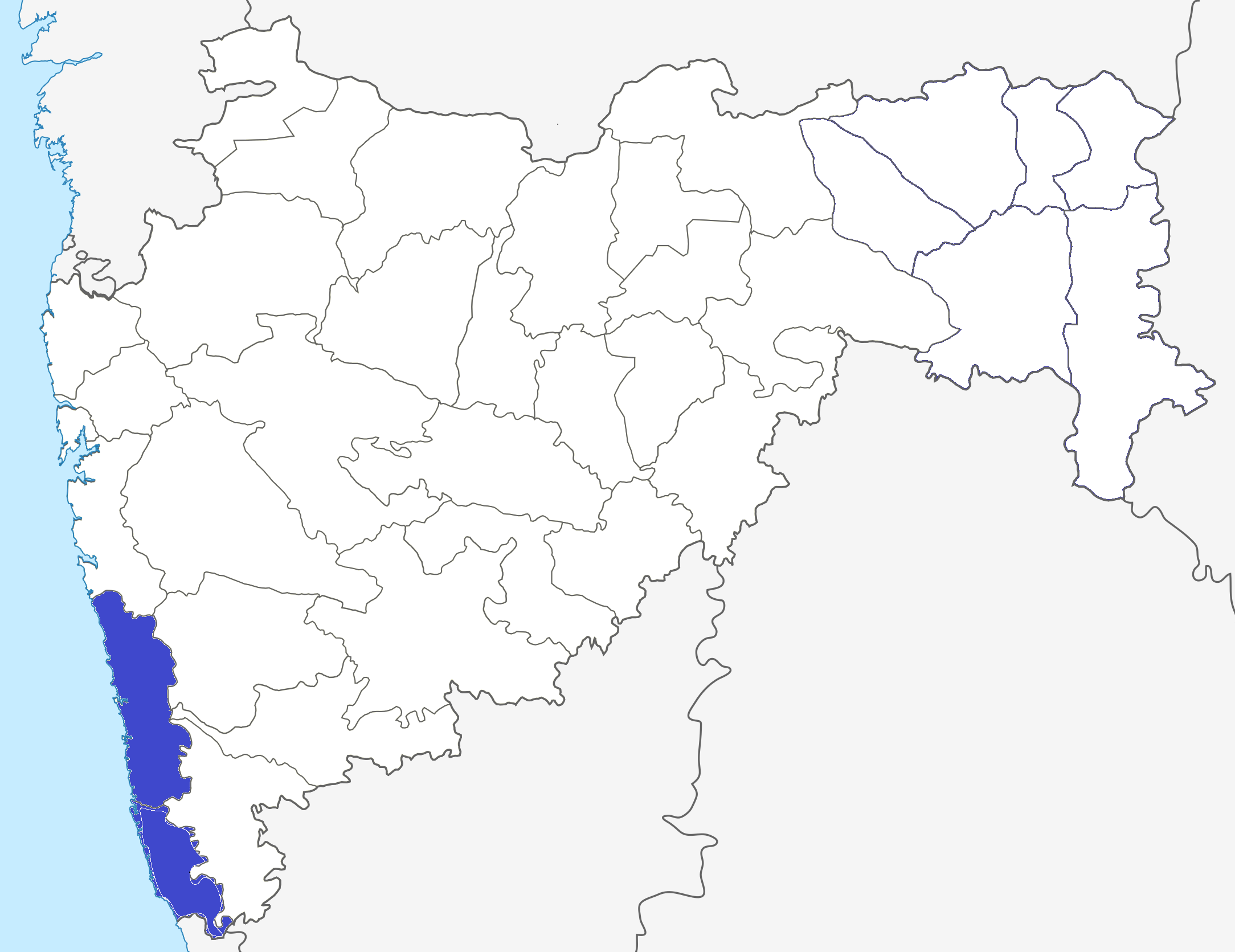
South is Sindhudurg district and North is Ratnagiri district

Malvan region refers to the Sindhudurg district in Maharashtra, on the western coast of India. Earlier it was a part of the Ratnagiri district which was bifurcated into the Sindhudurg district on 1 May 1981, for administrative convenience and industrial and agricultural development. Sindhudurg district is known as the Malvan region due to the presence of the Malvani language which is spoken by the locals known as Malvani people in the region. In the bordering areas of Goa and Karnataka, this region is known as Malnad.
