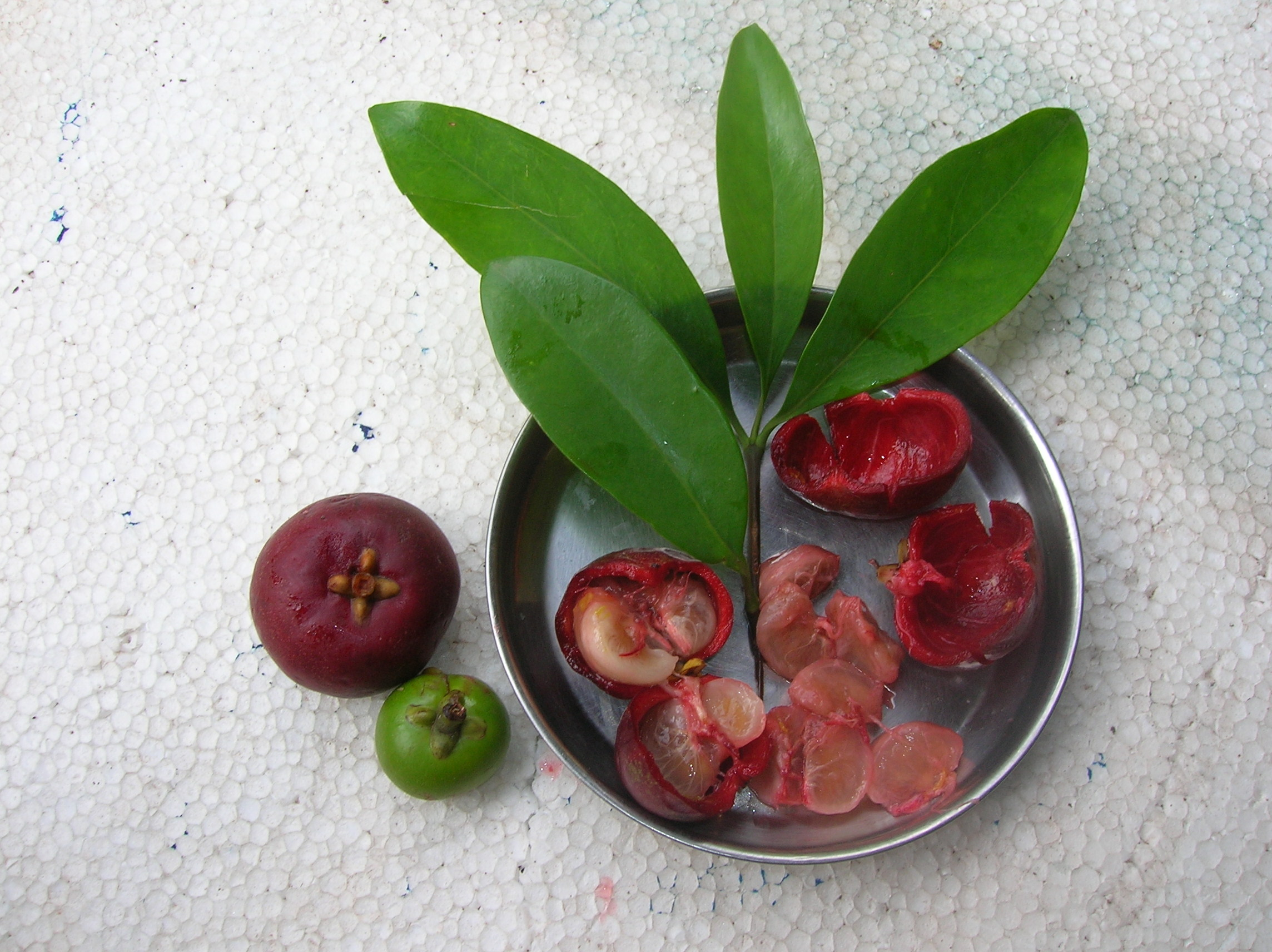
- Kokum fruits, seeds, pulp and rinds

Conservation status
- Vulnerable (IUCN 3.1)

Scientific classification
- Kingdom: Plantae
- Clade: Tracheophytes
- Clade: Angiosperms
- Clade: Eudicots
- Clade: Rosids
- Order: Malpighiales
- Family: Clusiaceae
- Genus: Garcinia
- Species: G. indica

Binomial name
- Garcinia indica (Thouars) Choisy

Synonyms
- Brindonia celebica Thouars; Brindonia indica Thouars (1806) (basionym); Brindonia oxycarpa Thouars; Garcinia celebica (Thouars) Desr., nom. illeg. homonym. post.; Garcinia purpurea Roxb.; Oxycarpus indica (Thouars) Poir.; Stalagmitis indica (Thouars) G.Don; Stalagmitis purpurea G.Don; Xanthochymus purpureus Lodd. ex G.Don

= Garcinia indica =

Species of tree

Garcinia indica, a plant in the mangosteen family (Clusiaceae), commonly known as kokum, is a fruit-bearing tree that has culinary, pharmaceutical, and industrial uses. It grows primarily in India's Western Ghats: in the states of Maharashtra, Goa, Karnataka and Kerala. It is considered as an endemic species to the Western Ghats and forests in India. It grows in coastal and foothill moist forests up to 1,000 metres elevation with more than 2,500 mm of average annual rainfall. It favors lateritic alluvial soils with a depth of one or more metres and pH of 6.7.

The species was first described as Brindonia indica by Louis Marie Aubert du Petit Thouars in 1806. In 1823 Jacques Denys Choisy placed the species in genus Garcinia as G. indica.

== Plant description ==
Garcinia indica is a medium-sized evergreen tree. It grows to a height of about 18 m. The tree has drooping branches.

The berries ripen in the summer. They are spherical with a diameter of about 5 cm. They have indentations on the top, on the stalk, and on the bottom. Each berry has 5 to 8 seeds surrounded by a sweet and sour pulp that contains some fibers. They are initially green, but turn red as they ripen.

== Taxonomy ==
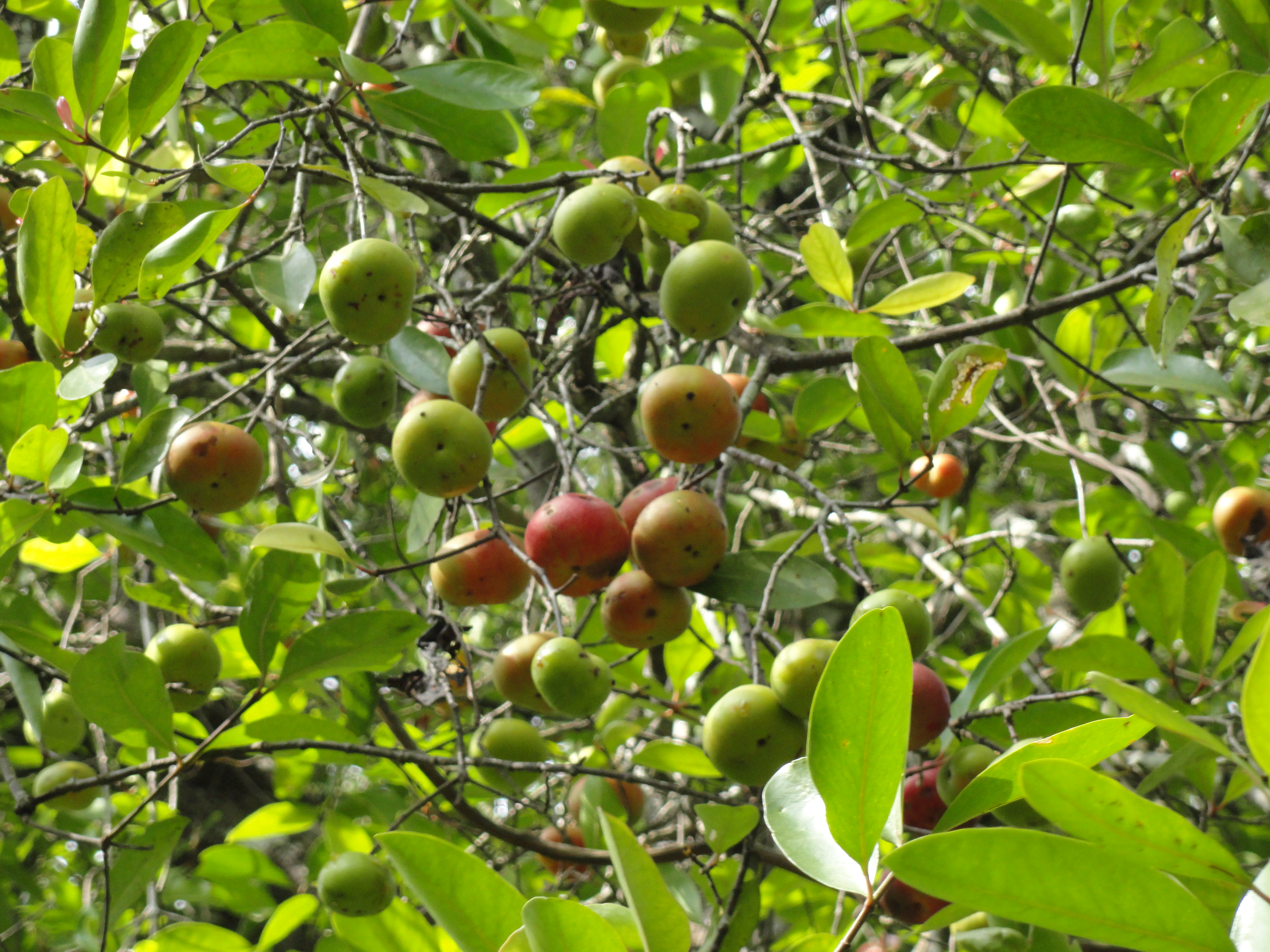
A kokum tree soon to be ready for harvest

The genus Garcinia, belonging to the family Clusiaceae, includes about 200 species found in the Old World tropics, mostly in Asia and Africa. Garcinia indica is an evergreen, monoecious tree, which can grow up to 18 meters high, on maturity attaining a pyramid shape.

The fruit, an orange-sized purple berry with fleshy endocarp, contains five to eight seeds, which account for 20–23% of the fruit's weight. The kernels account for 61 percent of the weight of the seed and about 44% of its oil. The seeds are compressed and embedded in an acidic pulp.

== Distribution ==
Garcinia indica is indigenous to the tropical forest regions of India. Of the 35 Garcinia species found in India, 17 are endemic. Of these, seven are endemic to the Western Ghats, six in the Andaman and Nicobar Islands and four in the northeastern region of India. The Sindhudurg and Ratnagiri Kokum variety from the Ratnagiri and Sindhudurg districts from the coastal Konkan region of the state of Maharashtra in India has received the GI (Geographical Indication) tag.

Garcinia indica is found in forest lands, riversides and wastelands. These plants prefer evergreen forests, but sometimes they also thrive in areas with relatively low rainfall. It is also cultivated on a small scale. It does not require irrigation, spraying with pesticides or fertilizers.

== Uses ==
=== Culinary uses ===
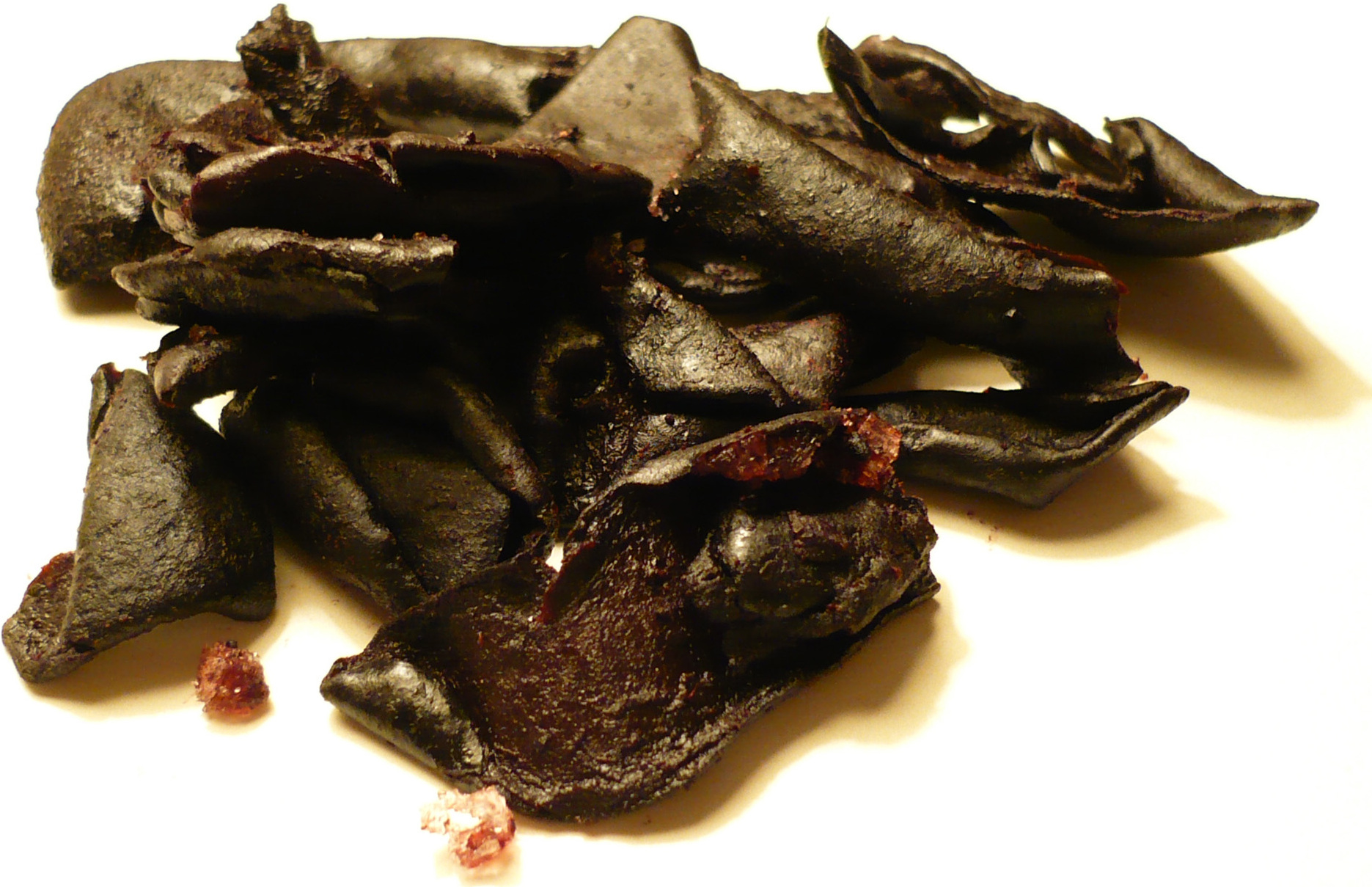
The dried skin of kokum fruits

The outer cover of fruit is dried in the sun to get aamsul or kokam. It is used as a souring agent typically in Maharashtra, Assam, Karnataka, Goa, Gujarat. Kokum yields a distinctive flavour and deep-red colour. As a souring agent, it is used as an alternative to tamarind in curries and other dishes from south India. It is also used in cuisine from Gujarat, where it is frequently used to add flavor and tartness to dal (lentil soup) for flavor balance. It is extensively used in Assamese cuisine in many dishes like masor tenga (sour fish curry) and tenga dali (sour dal).

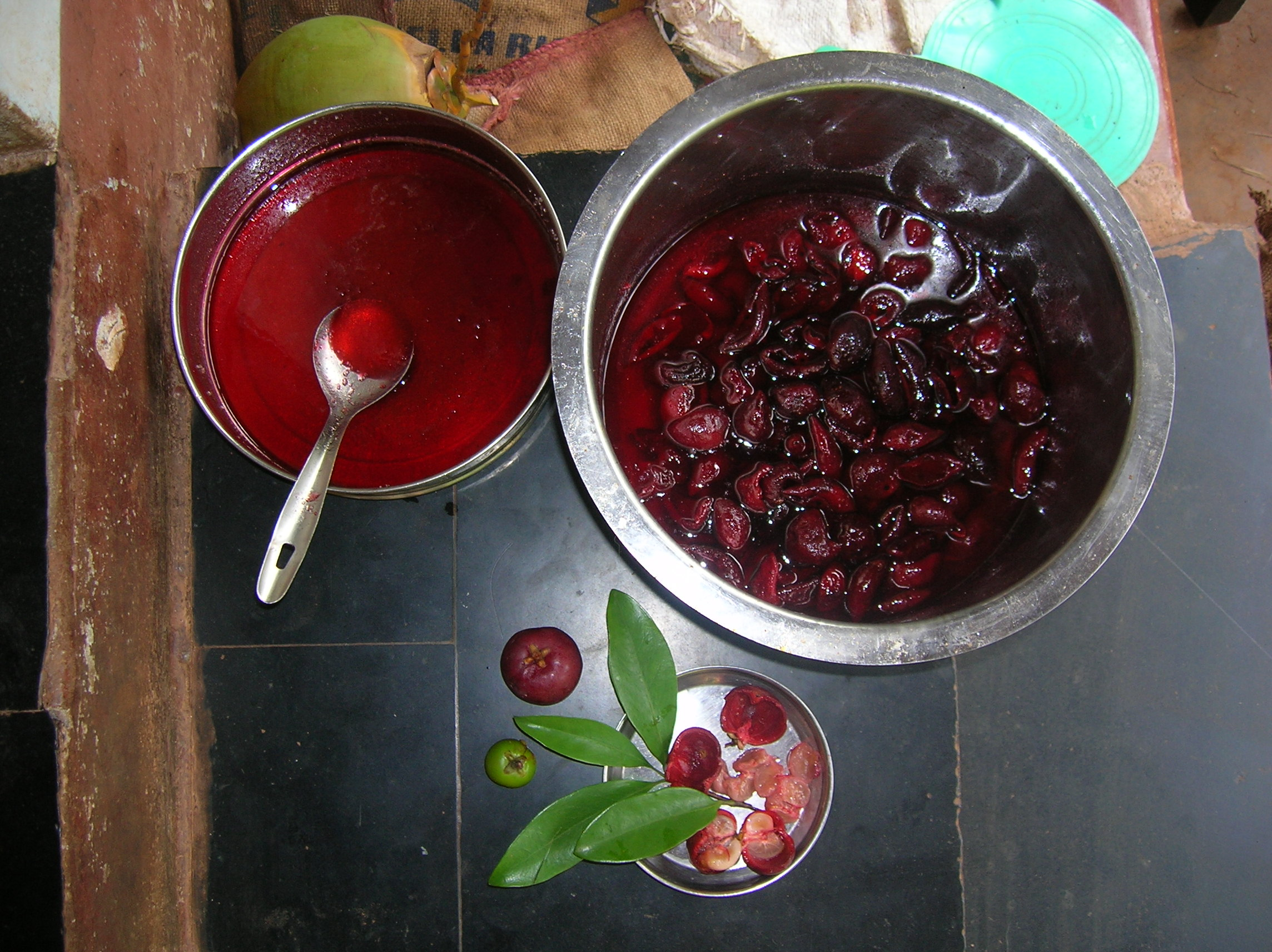
The vessel on the left contains syrup which is obtained from the vessel containing kokum rinds, on the right. The syrup is used to make kokum sherbet.

The fresh fruit is preserved with sugar to make bright-red squash that is diluted with water and bottled for sale as a beverage called Kokum Sarbat.

The extract of the fruit is called aagul in Konkani and Marathi. It is added during the preparation of solkadhi, which may also include coconut milk, coriander and garlic.

=== Industrial uses ===
The seed of Garcinia indica contains 23–26% Kokum butter, which remains solid at room temperature. It is used in the preparation of chocolate and sugar confectionery.

=== Medicinal and cosmetics applications ===
The oily extract called Kukum butter is used in ointments and suppositories. It has application in skin and hair products, acne products and skin tonics.

The rind of the fruit is a good source of hydroxycitric acid which has been claimed to modify lipid metabolism.

=== Other uses ===
The tree is ornamental, with a dense canopy of green leaves and red-tinged, tender, young leaves.

== Gallery ==
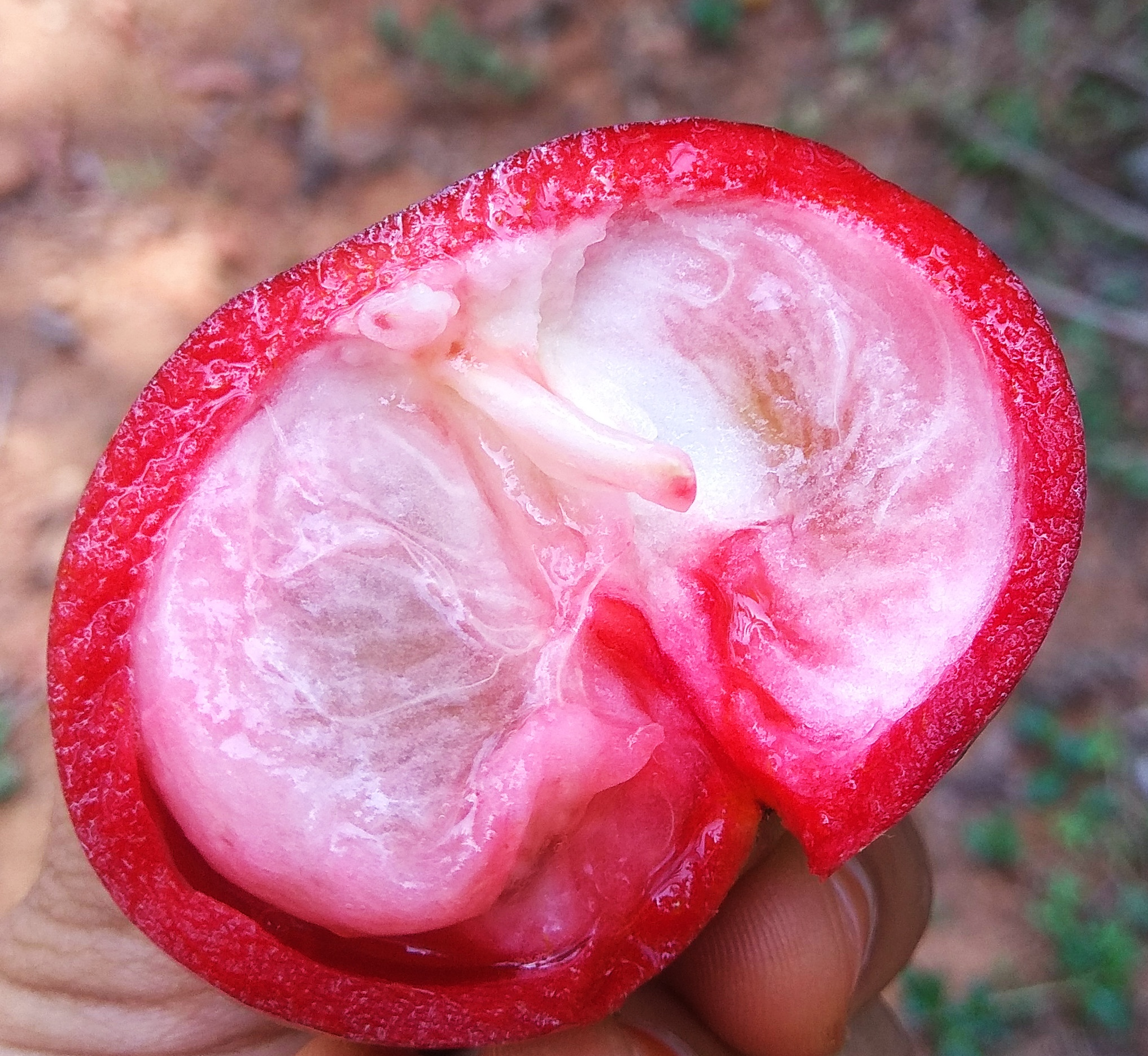
Ripe Kokum fruit

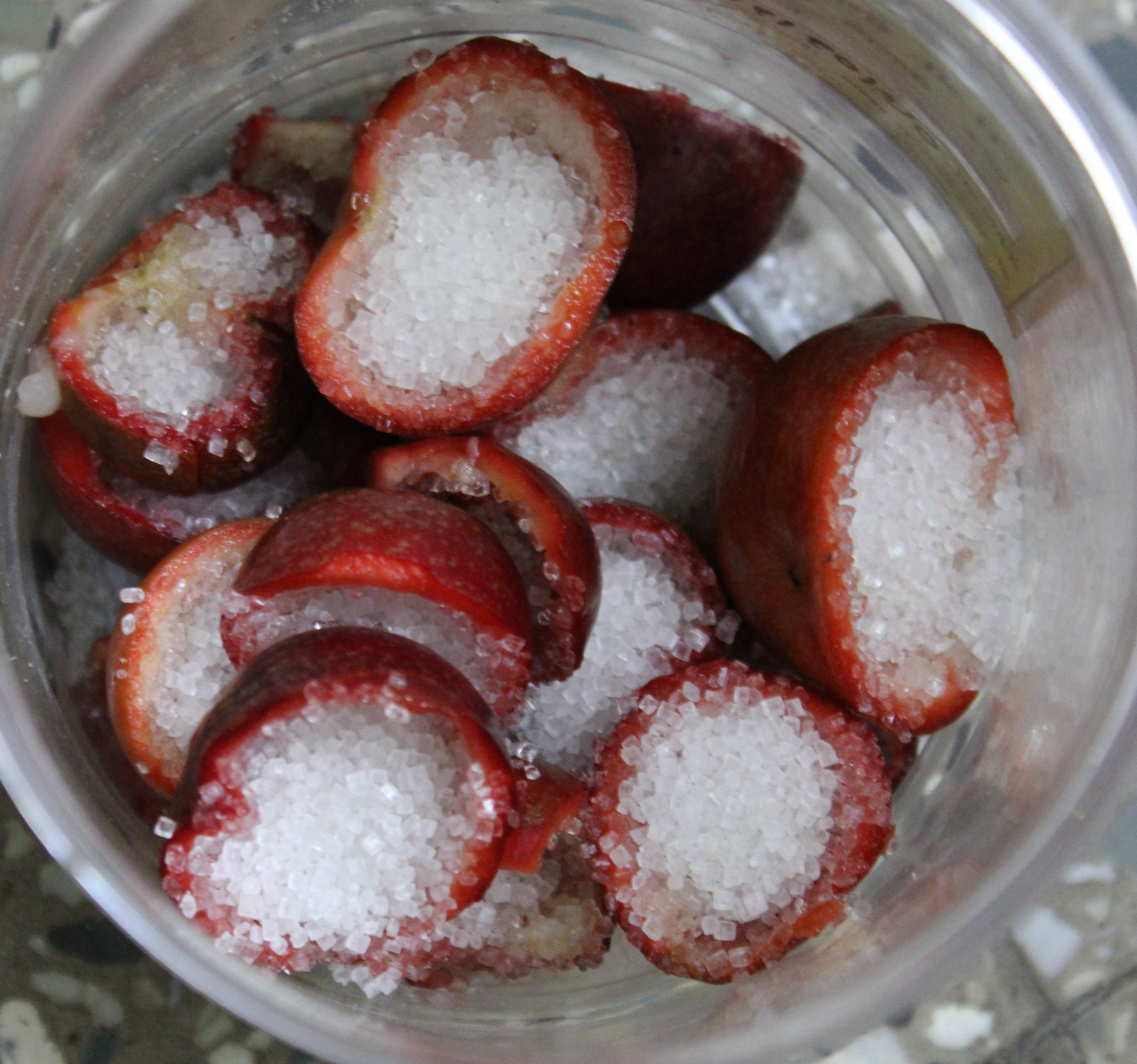
Fresh Kokum fruit filled with sugar in glass jar and kept under the sun to make kokum syrup for refreshments.

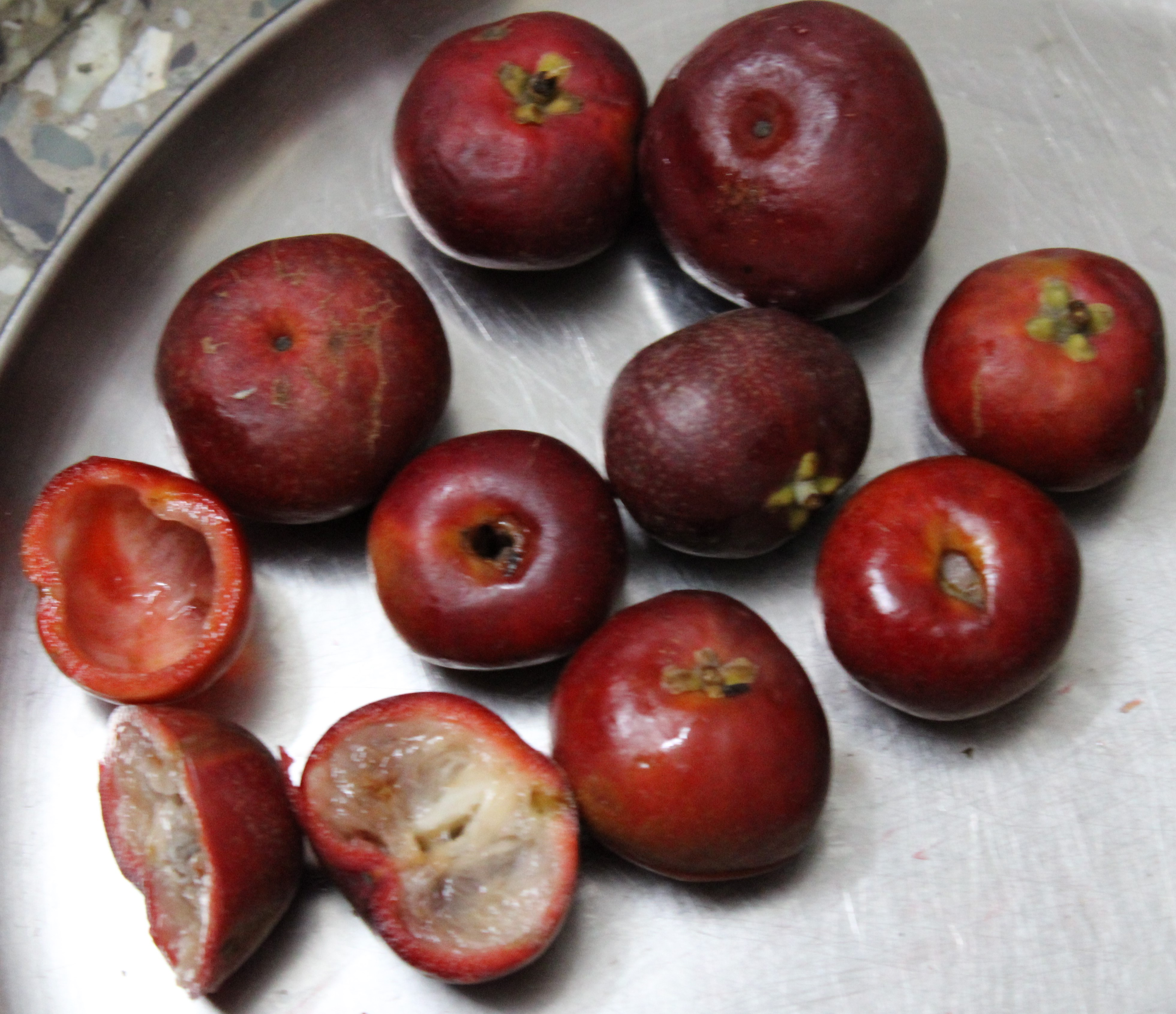
Kokum fruits being prepared to make syrup

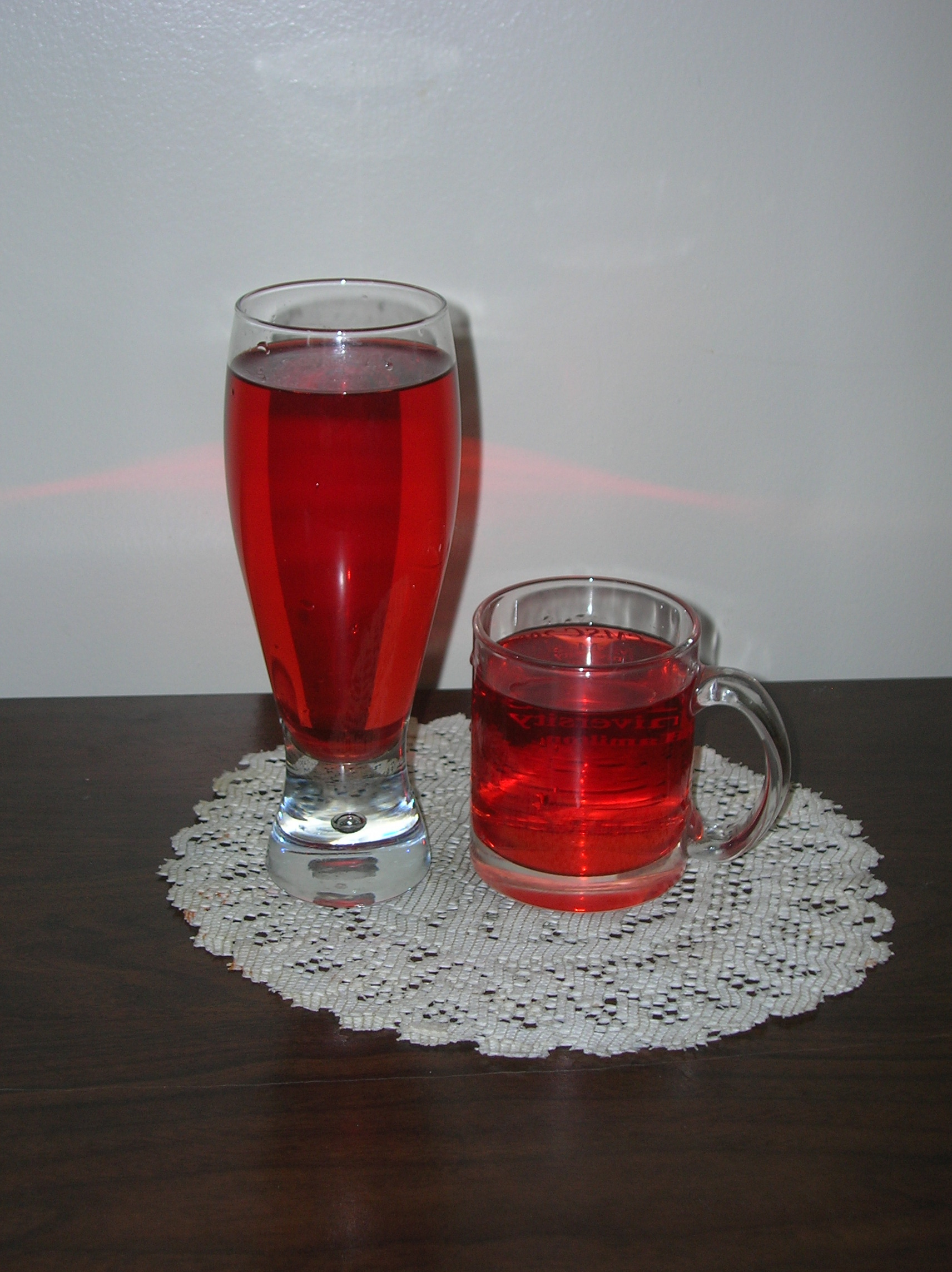
Kokum drink prepared from dried rinds

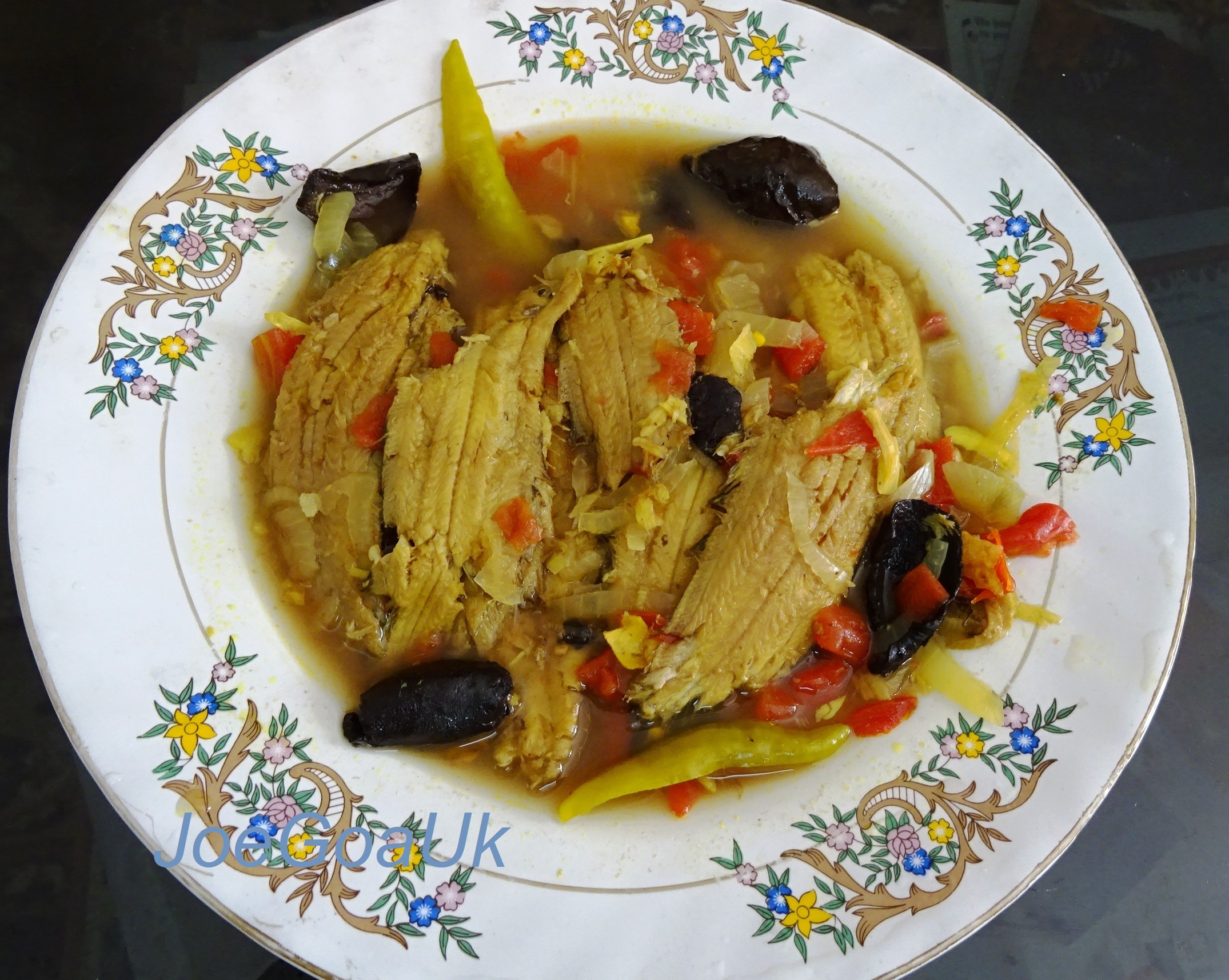
Goan fish curry Agsol with dried kokum rinds for flavoring

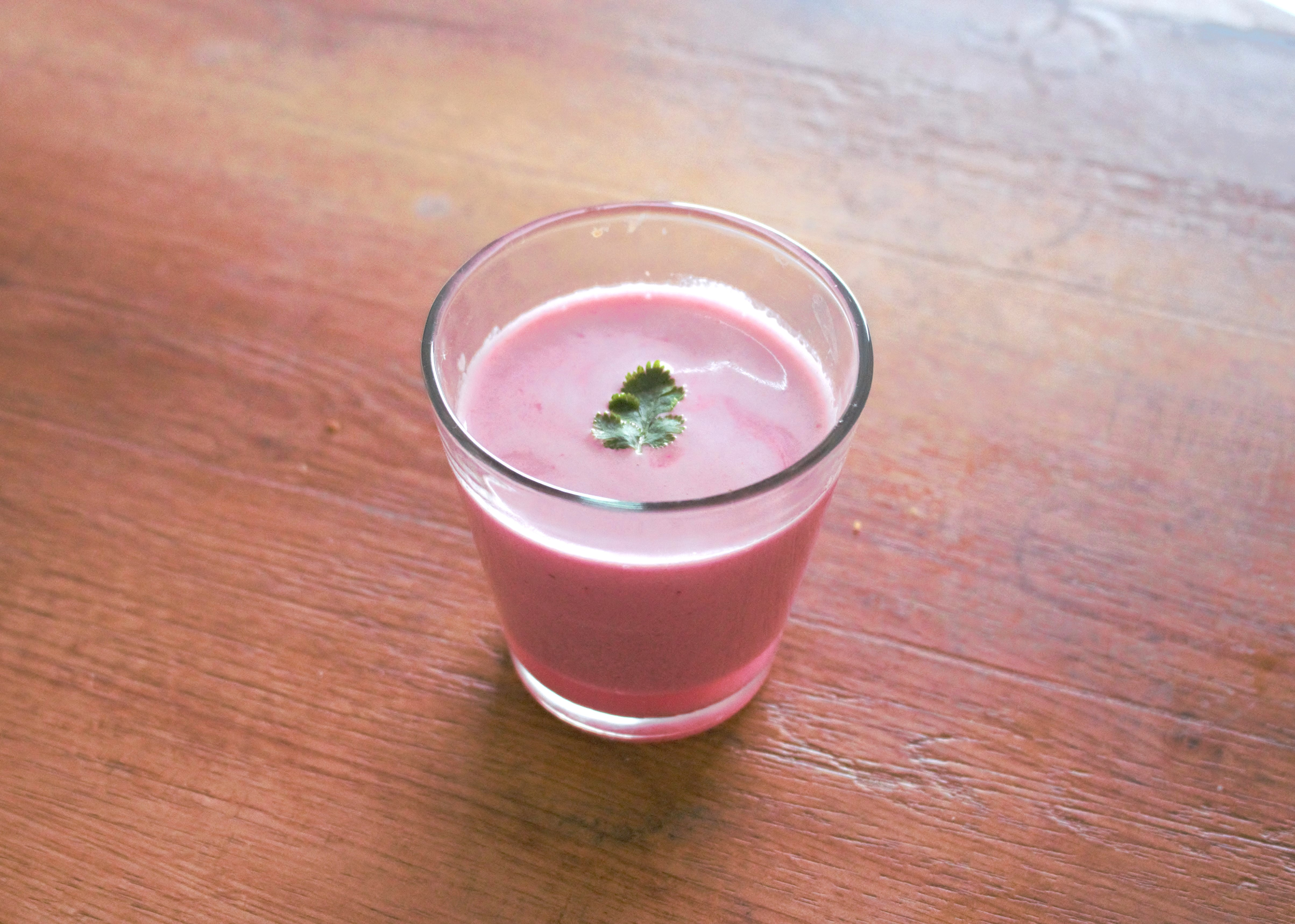
Solkadhi made from coconut milk and kokum

== See also ==
- Sindhudurg and Ratnagiri Kokum
