= Solkadhi =

Indian drink

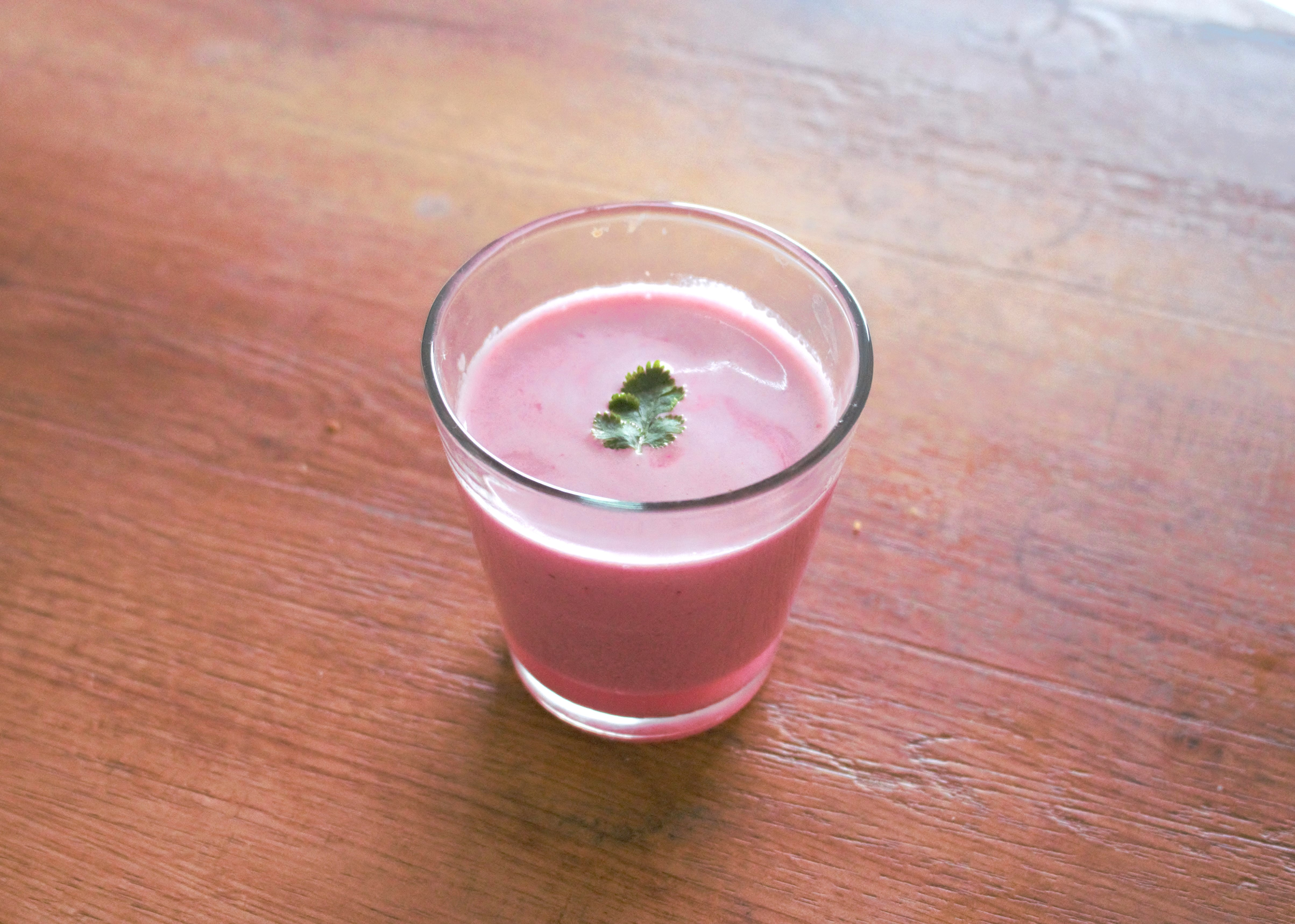
- Sol kadhi
- Type: Drink
- Course: Appetizer
- Place of origin: India
- Region or state: Konkan region (coastal Maharashtra, Goa and parts of Karnataka)
- Main ingredients: Kokum, Coconut milk

Solkadhi is a type of probiotic drink, an appetizer originating from the Indian subcontinent, usually consumed with rice or sometimes after a meal. Popular in the Konkan regions, especially Maharashtra (Sindhudurg and Ratnagiri district) Goa, Mangalore, Northern parts of Karnataka (especially Belagavi) and parts of coastal Maharashtra, it is made from coconut milk and dried kokum skins (agal/amsul), whose anthocyanin pigments provide a deep purple-pink colour.

== Preparation ==
Solkadhi is prepared with the liquid extract of fresh coconut known as coconut milk. It is usually mixed with agal or kokum, a little bit of salt, and chili-garlic paste for taste and probiotic contents.

It is traditionally served chilled and is consumed as a digestive after spicy meals, particularly fish based dishes common in the Konkan region.

== See also ==
- List of Indian beverages
