= Malvani people =

Malvani people or Malvanis are an ethnic group from the Malvan region, which includes Malvan, Kudal, Vengurla, Kankavli, Vaibhavwadi, Devgad, Sawantwadi and Dodamarg tehsils of Sindhudurg, India, speaking the Malvani language. Malvani people are mostly of the Konkani ethnicities. It may also refer to the residents of Malvan. There are also Malvani Konkani speaking people in certain parts of Belgaum who are mostly Catholics.

There is another prominent locality in Malad, Mumbai which goes by the same name as Malvani.
