= Vengurla taluka =

Taluka in Sindhudurg district of Maharashtra

Vengurla taluka is a taluka in Sindhudurg district of Maharashtra; an Indian state.
