= Hanumantgad =

Hanumantgad Fort
- हनुमंतगड
- Part of Sahyadri Hill Range
- Sindhudurg district, Maharashtra
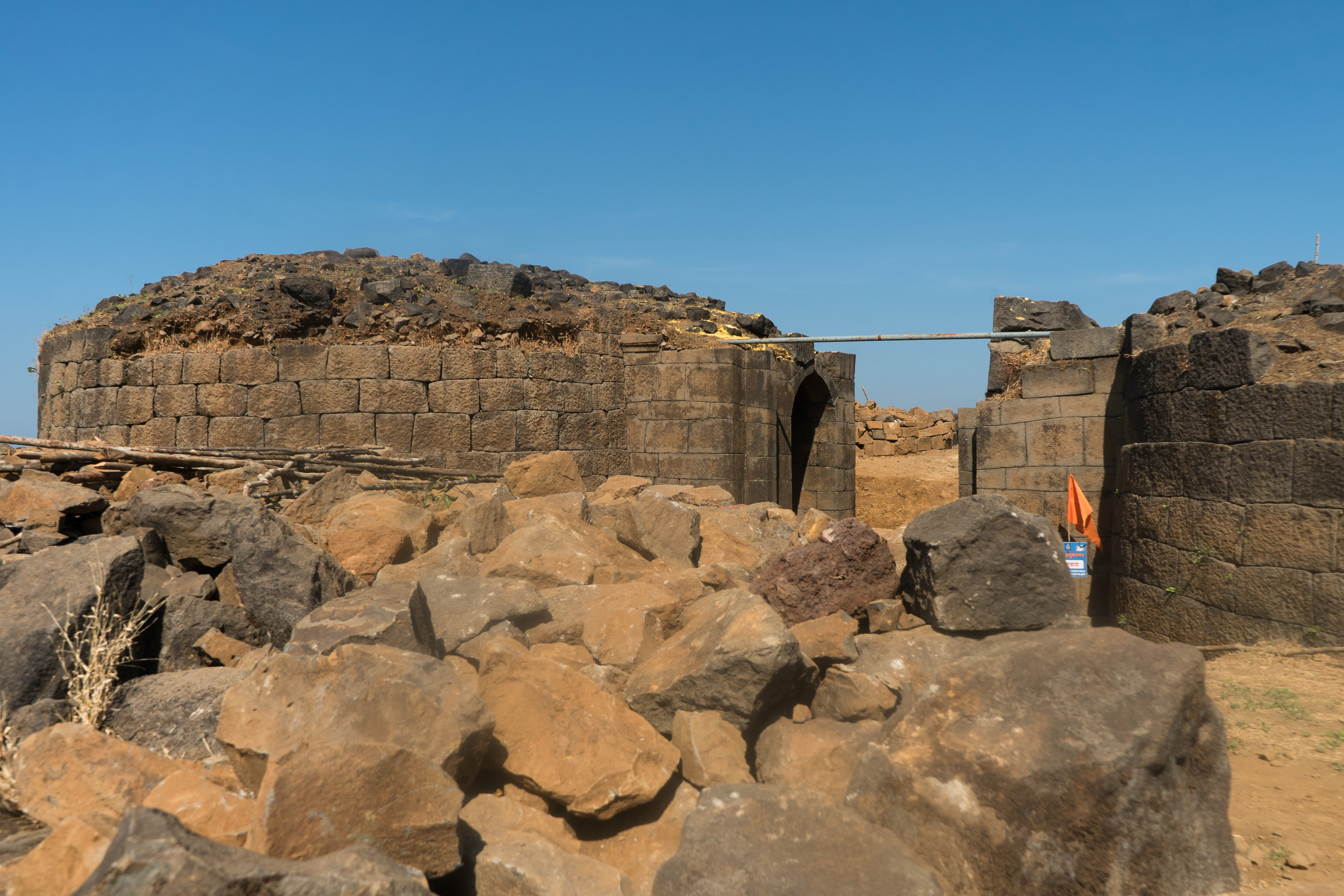
- Hanumantgad in 2023

Site information
- Type: Hill fort
- Owner: Government of India
- Controlled by: Maratha Empire (1739-1818); United Kingdom: East India Company (1818-1857); British Raj (1857-1947); India (1947-)
- Open to the public: Yes
- Condition: Ruins

Location
- Shown within Maharashtra Hanumantgad Fort (India)
- Coordinates: 15°51′13.9″N 73°58′06.2″E
- Height: 820 Ft.

Site history
- Materials: Stone

Hanumantgad (Marathi: हनुमंतगड) is a fort located 24 km from Sawantwadi, Sindhudurg district, of Maharashtra. The fort is situated on plateau at the top of the hill.

== History ==
The fort was built by Fond Sawants of Sawantwadi for protection from Portuguese and Kolhapur rulers. IN 1838 this fort was captured by British Army. Aatmo Chuker and his colleagues tried to capture this fort but, failed due to internal rivalry.

== How to reach ==
The nearest town is Banda which is 13 km from Sawantwadi. The base village of the fort is Fukeri which is 16 km from Banda. There are good hotels at Banda, now tea and snacks are also available in small hotels on the way. The Fukeri village is well connected by motorable road. The trekking path starts from the hillock north of the Fukeri. The trek route passes through dense forest and the ascent is very steep. It takes about an hour to reach the top of the fort. The night stay on the fort is not possible.

== Places to see ==
The fort walls are in demolished condition. The entrance gate on the southern side is in good condition but lay half buried in soil. There are two bastions and few rock cut cisterns on the fort. In the Fukeri village there are two metal cannons with manufactured year 1783 engraved upon them.

== See also ==
- List of forts in Maharashtra
- List of forts in India
- Marathi People
- List of Maratha dynasties and states
- Maratha Army
- Maratha titles
- Military history of India
