= Otvane =

Otvane is a settlement in the Sindhudurg district in the Indian state of Maharashtra. It is located 10 km (6.2 mi) from the taluka of Sawantvadi.

== Nearby cities ==
- Savantwadi (10 km)
- Banda

=== Nearest hill station ===
- Amboli

=== Nearest railway station ===
Savantwadi Road

=== Nearest airport ===
- Kolhapur (KLH) (Maharashatra)
- Belgaum (IXG) (Karnataka)
- Dabolim Airport (Goa)
- Manohar International Airport (Goa)

=== Places of interest ===
- Terekhol River
- Ravalnath Mandeer

=== Temples ===
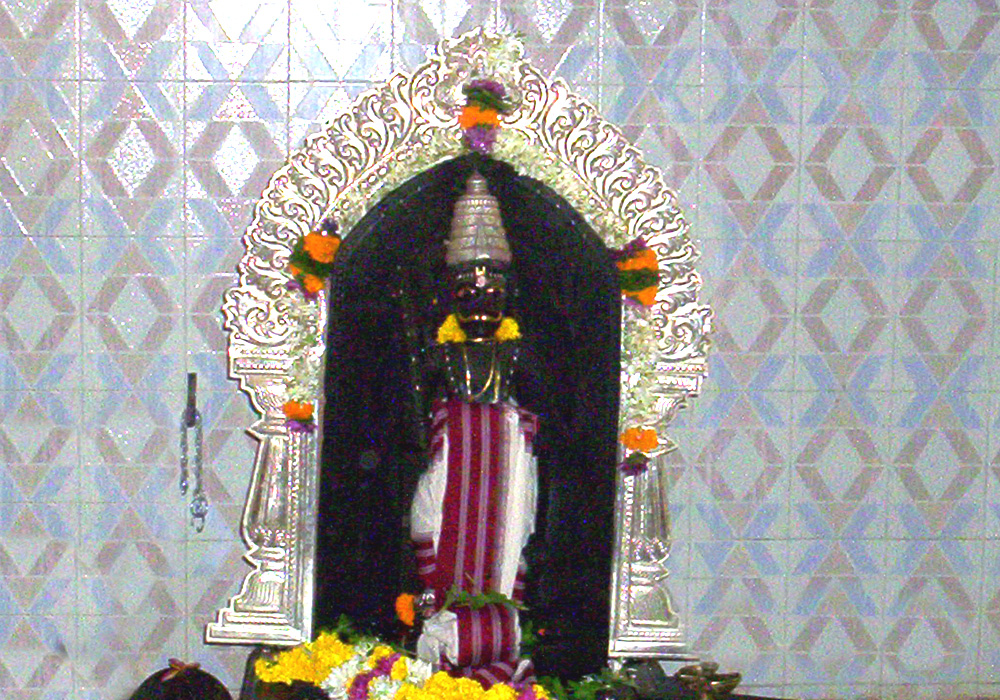
Ralvalnath

Otvane has historical value. Otvane village is home to a temple of the Hindu deity Ravalnath.

=== Nature and wildlife ===
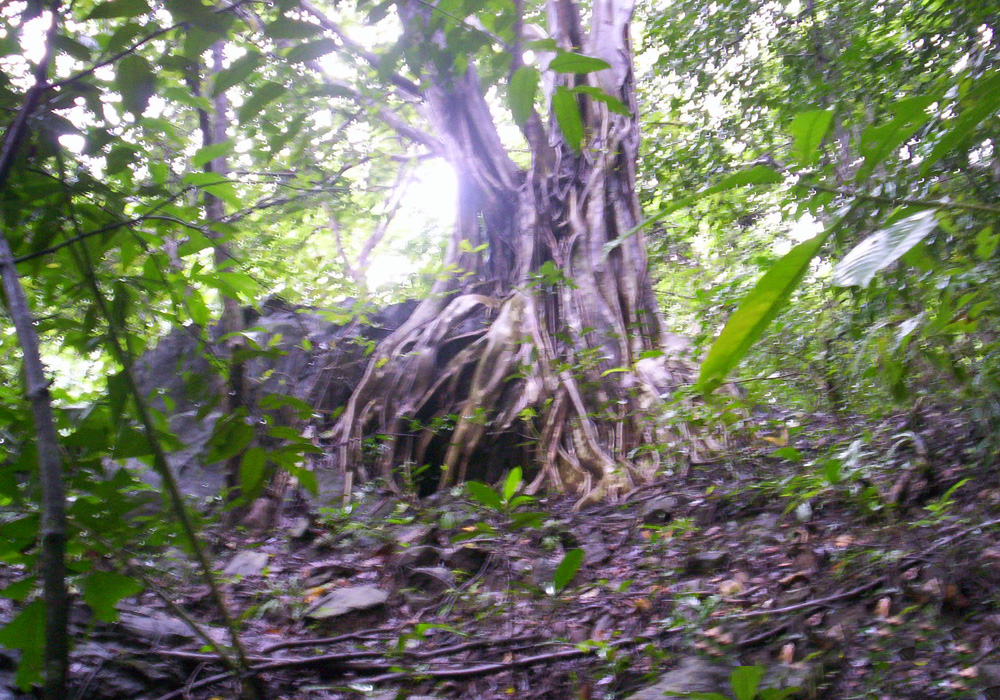

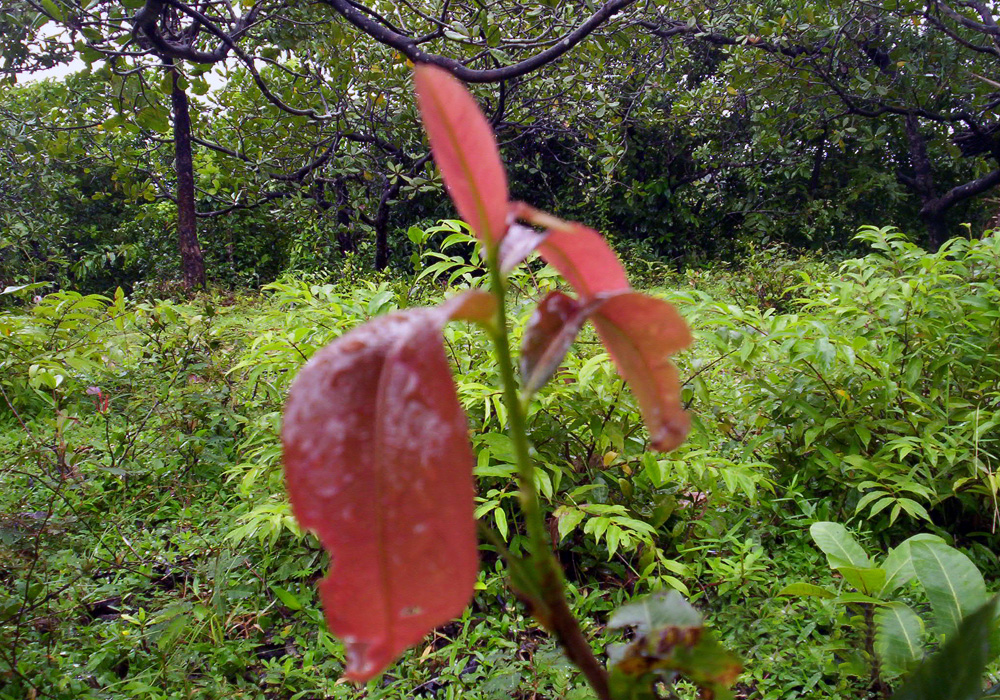

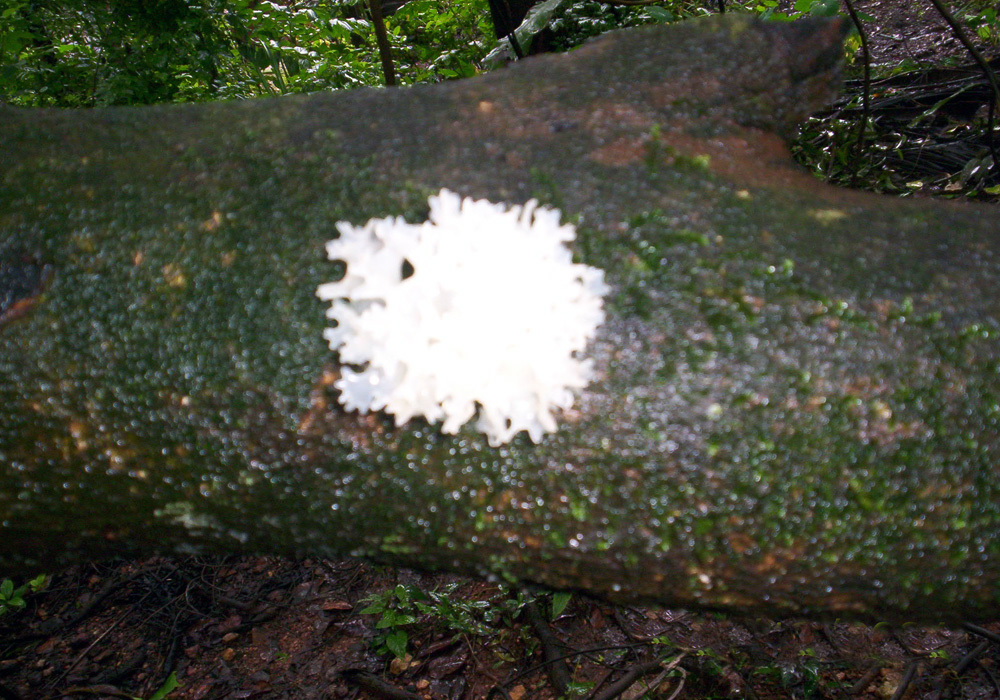

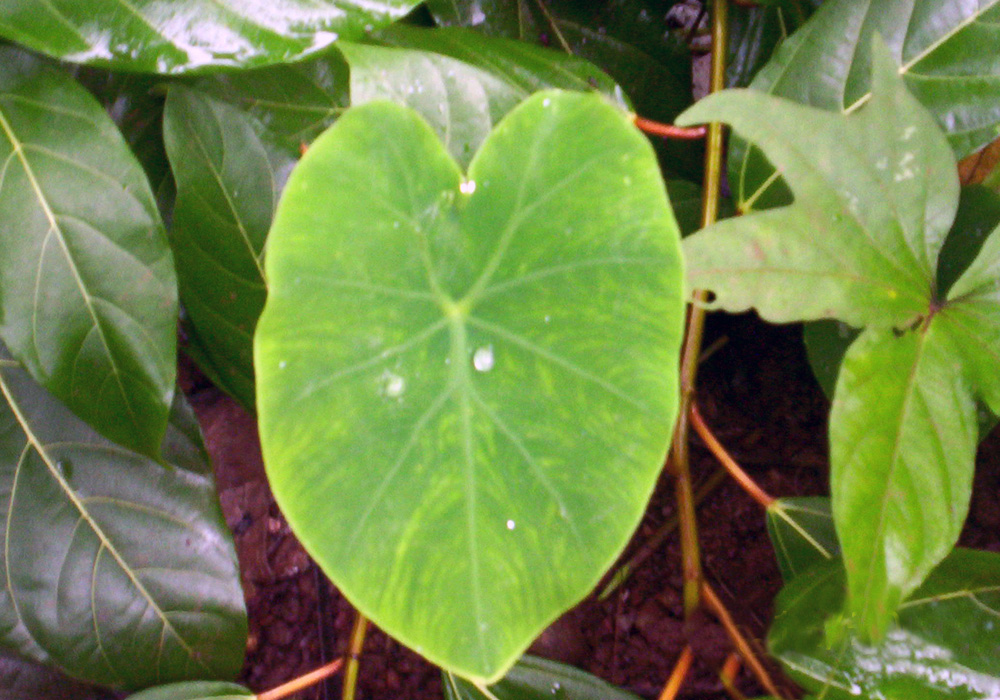

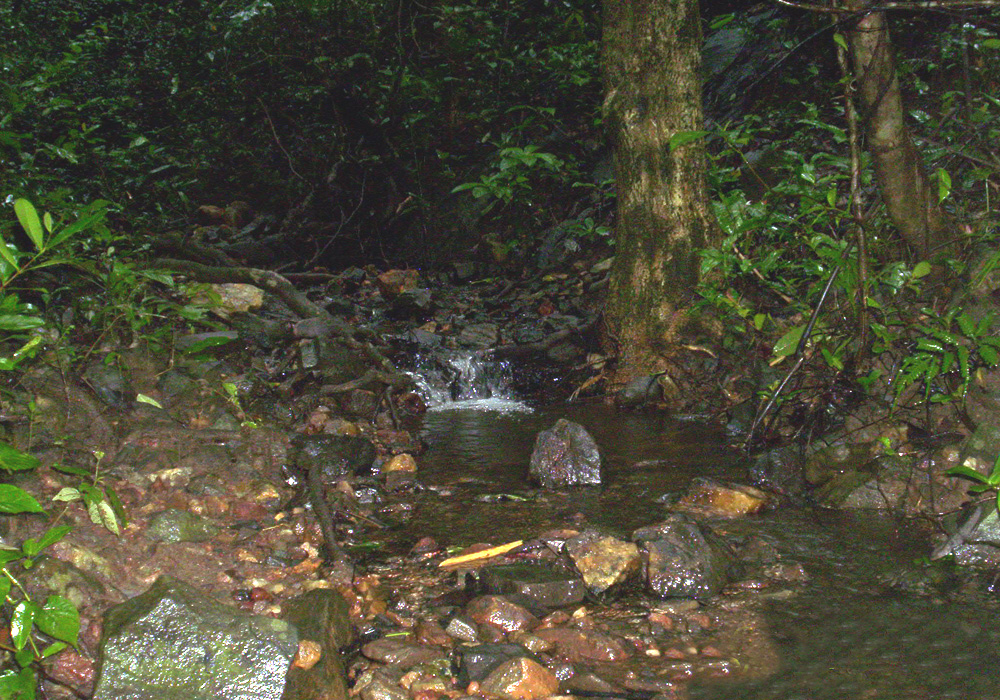
Stream

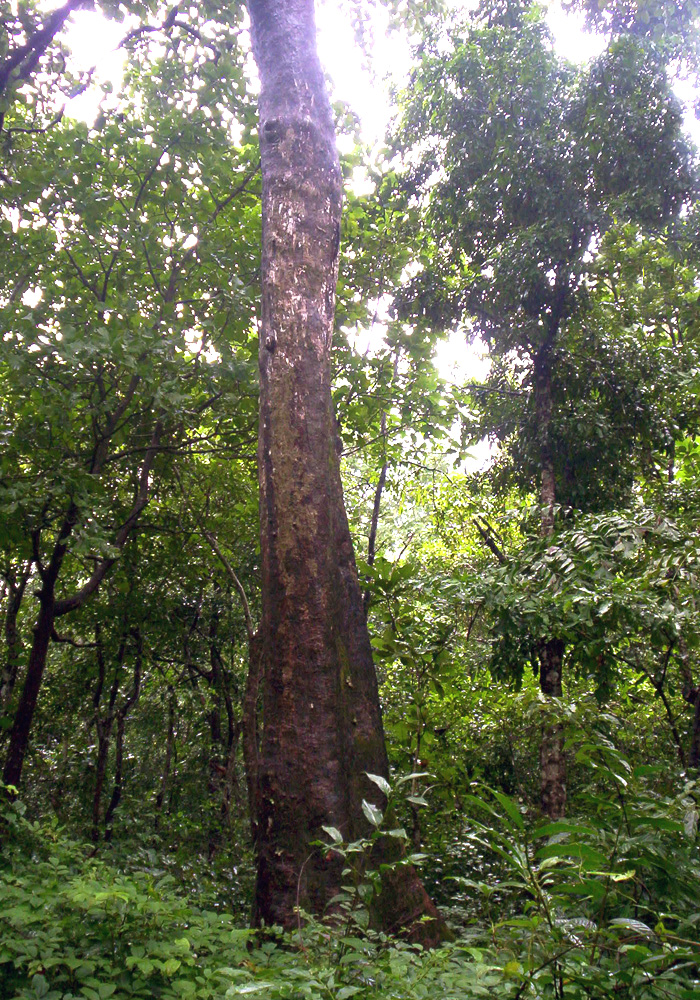

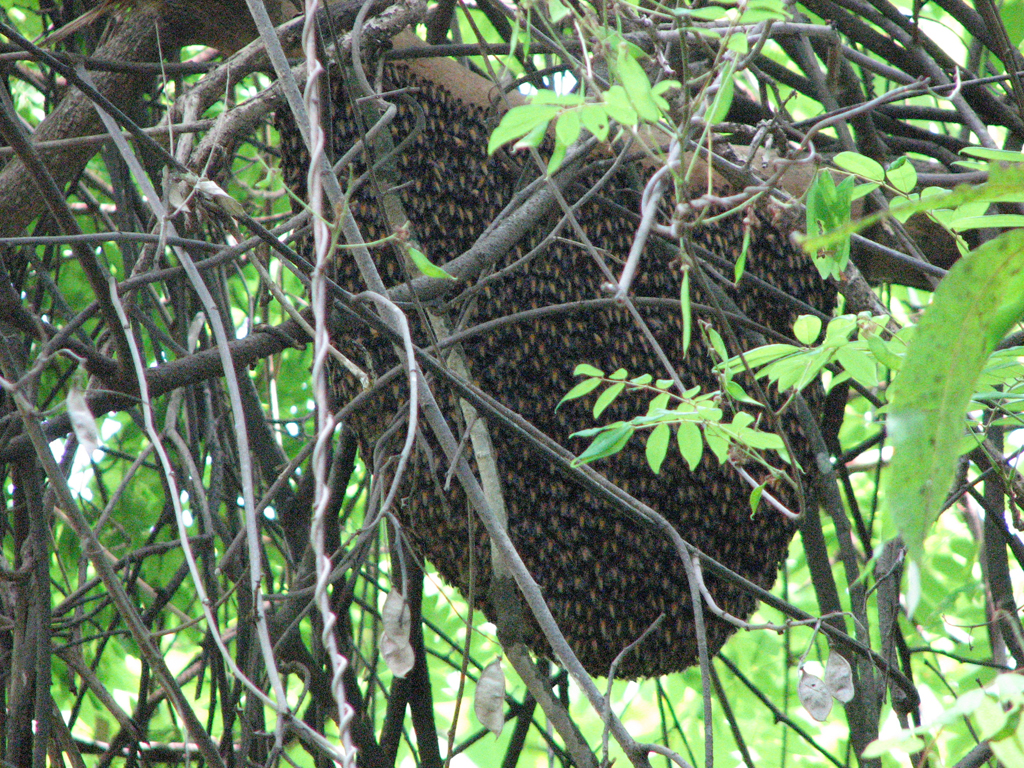
Honey comb

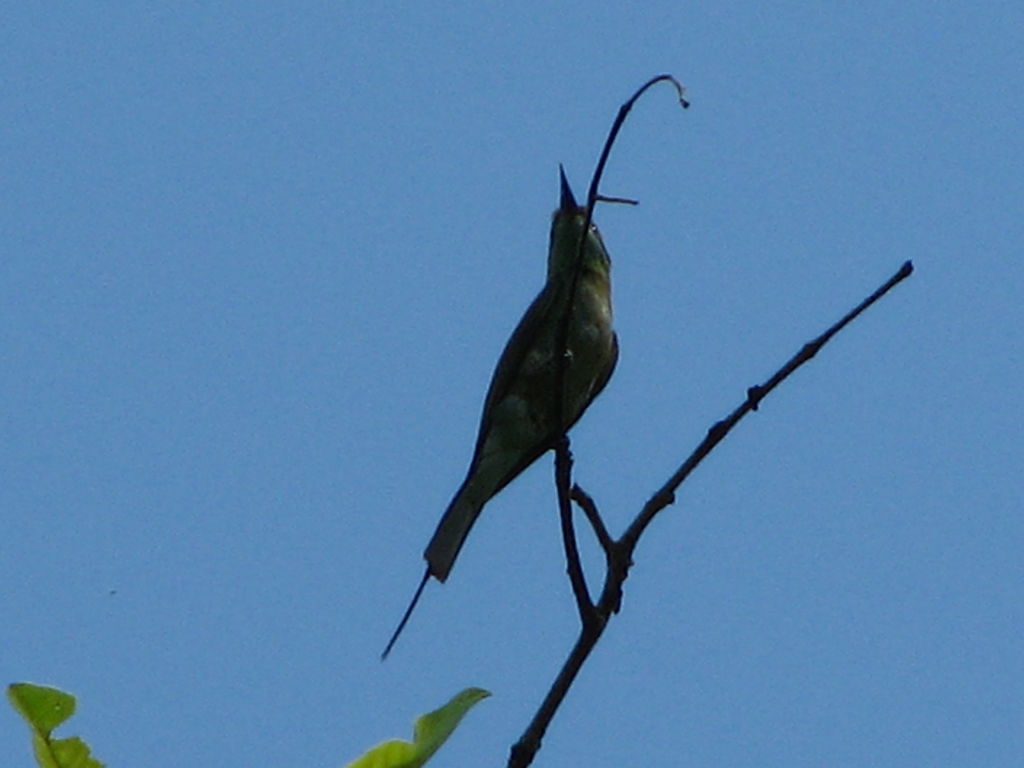
Blue tailed bee-eater

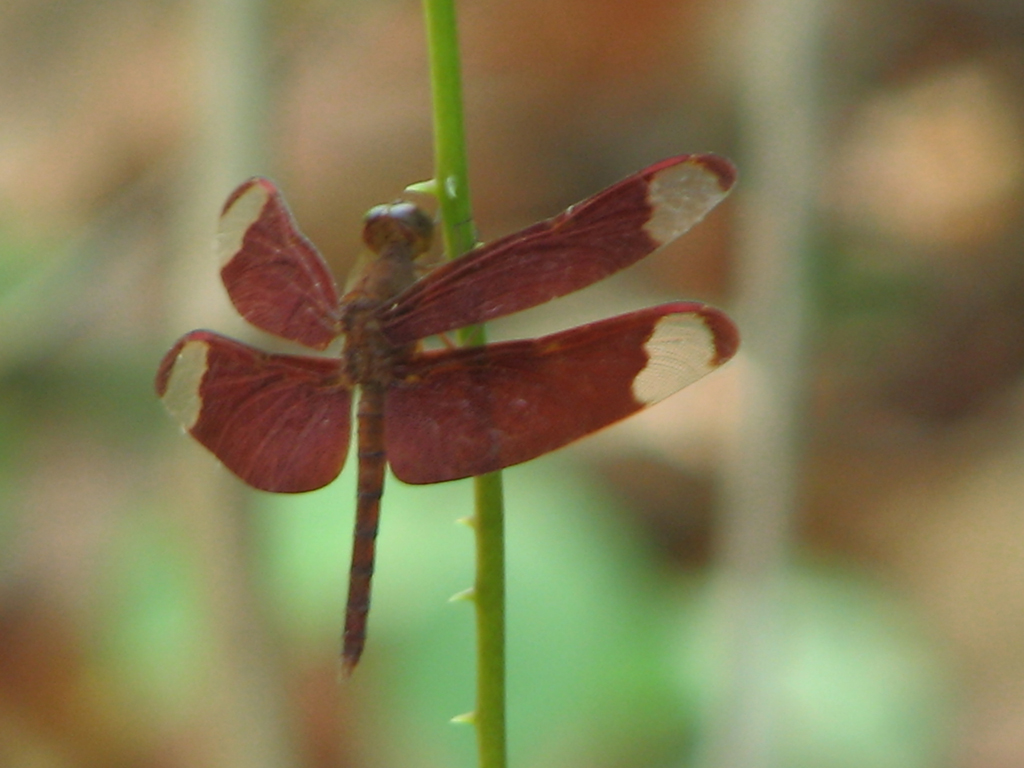
Dragonfly

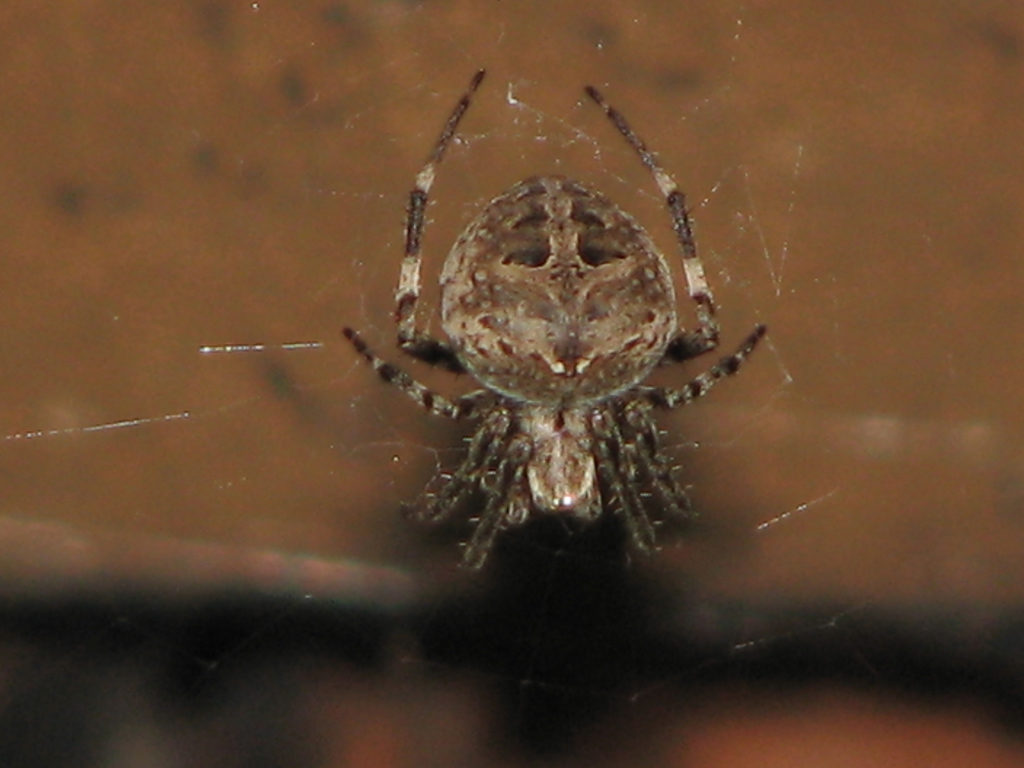
Cross spider

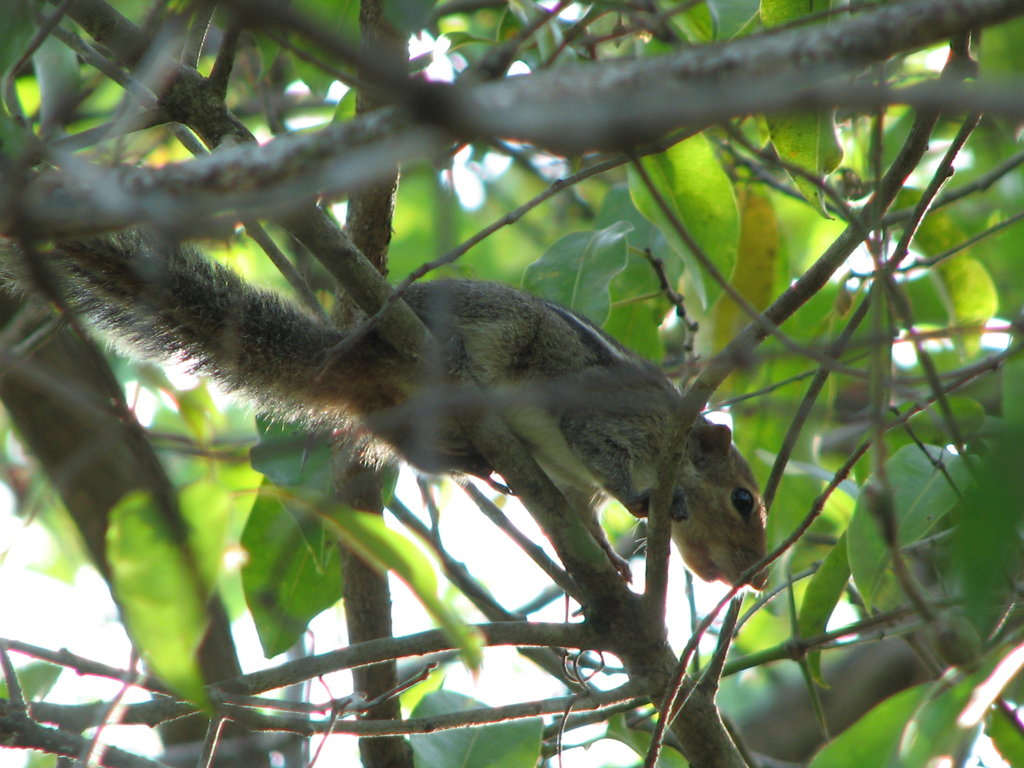
Squirrel

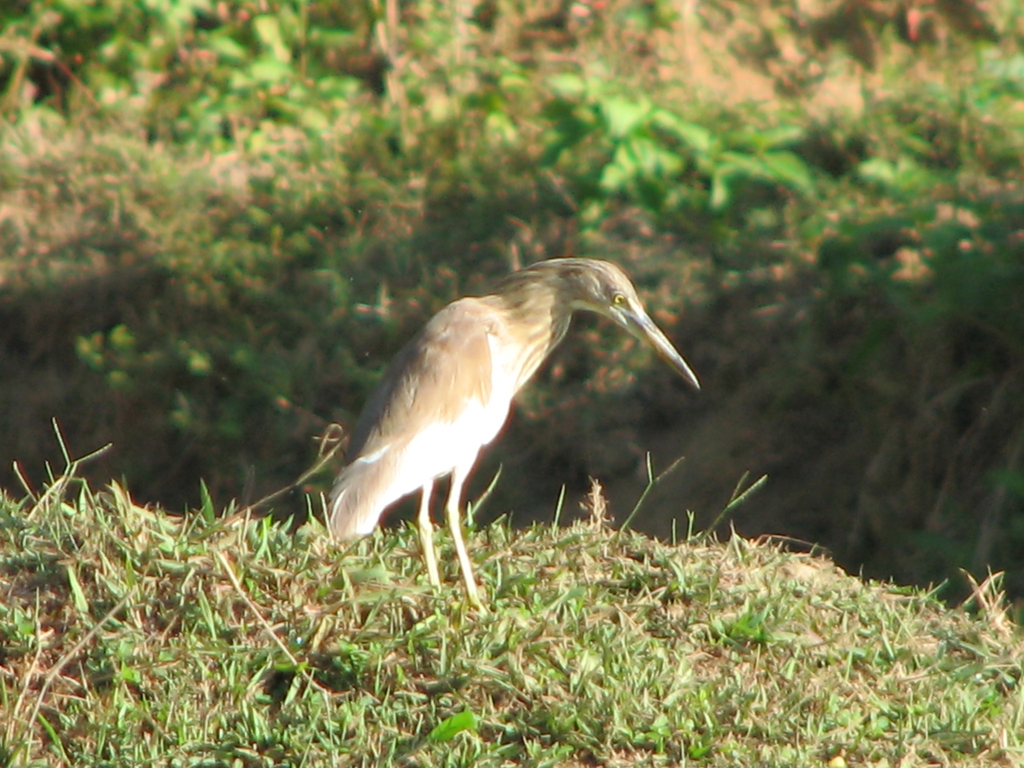
Cattle egret

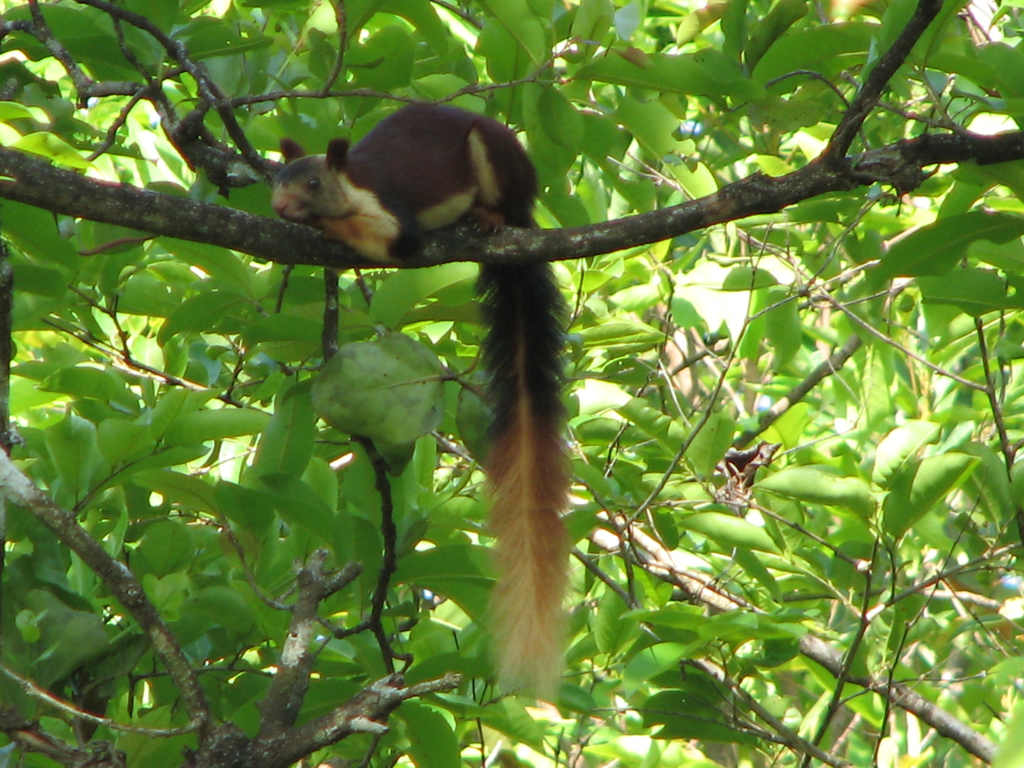
Indian giant squirrel

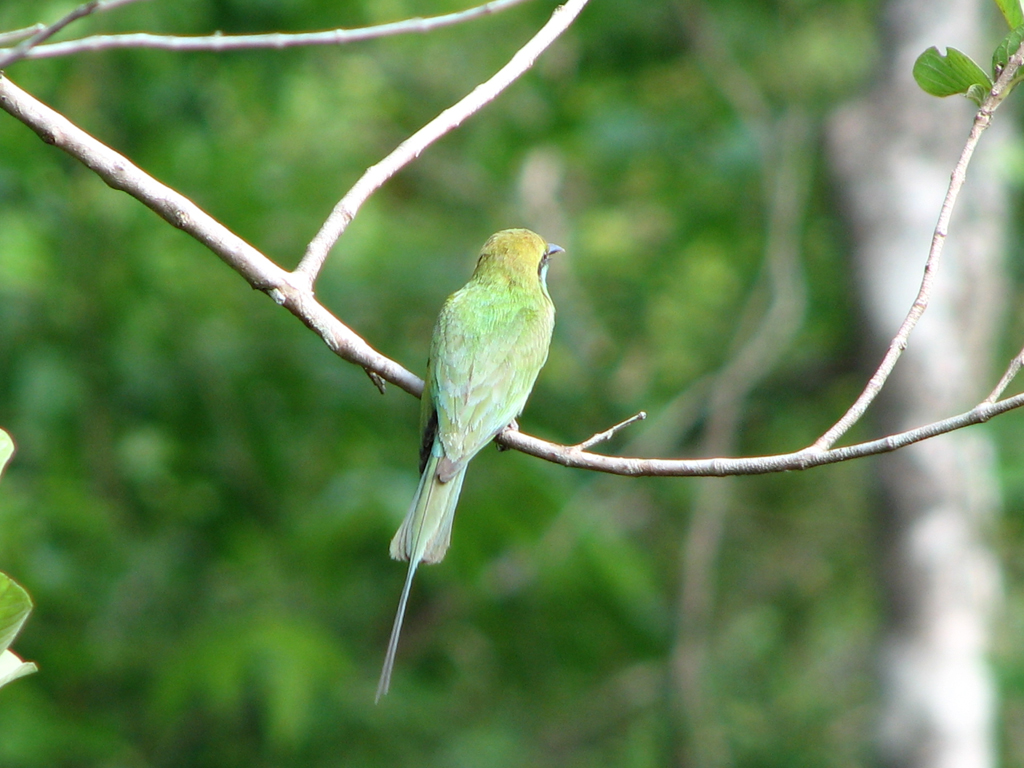
Blue tailed bee-eater

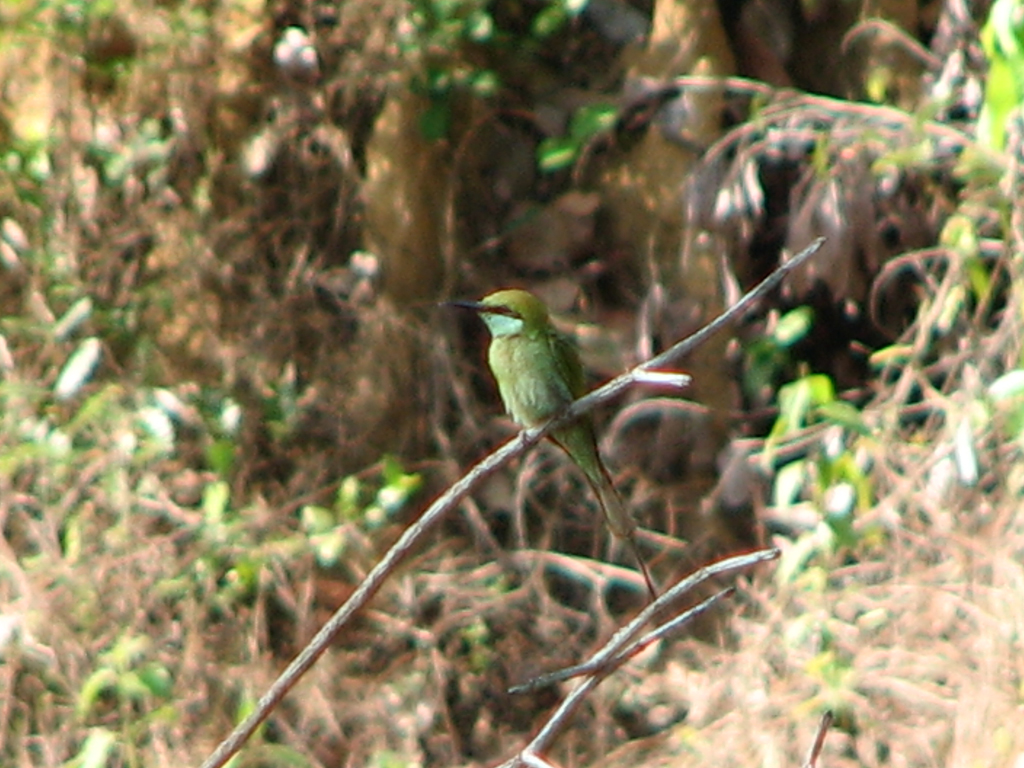
Blue tailed bee-eater

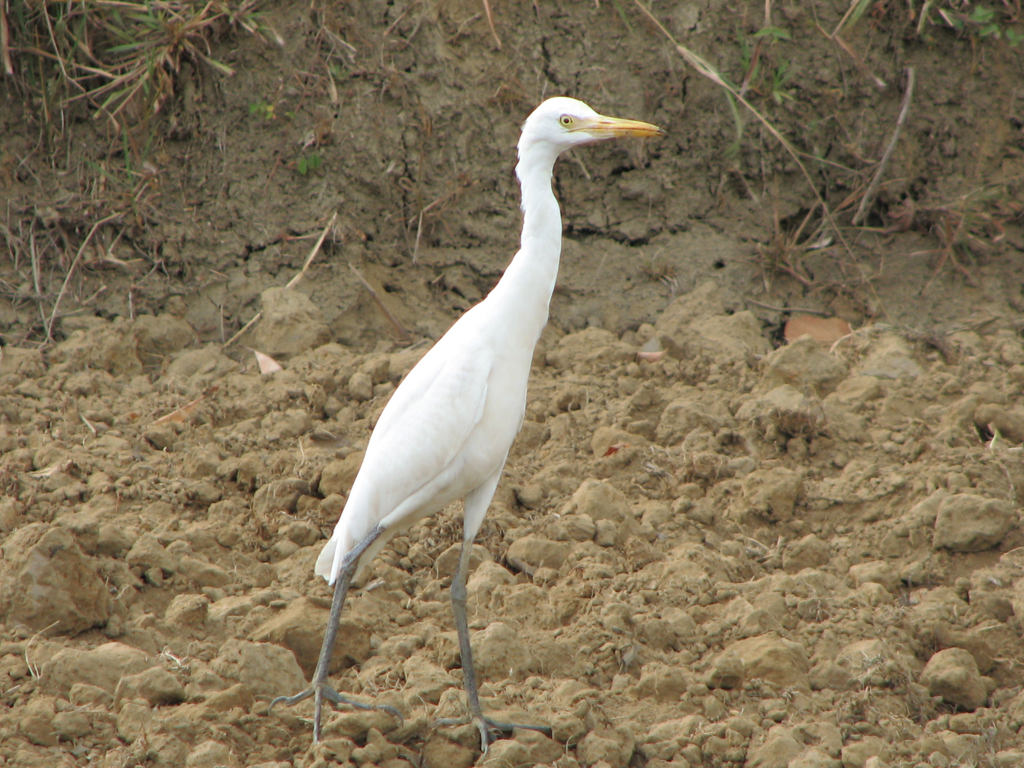
Cattle egret

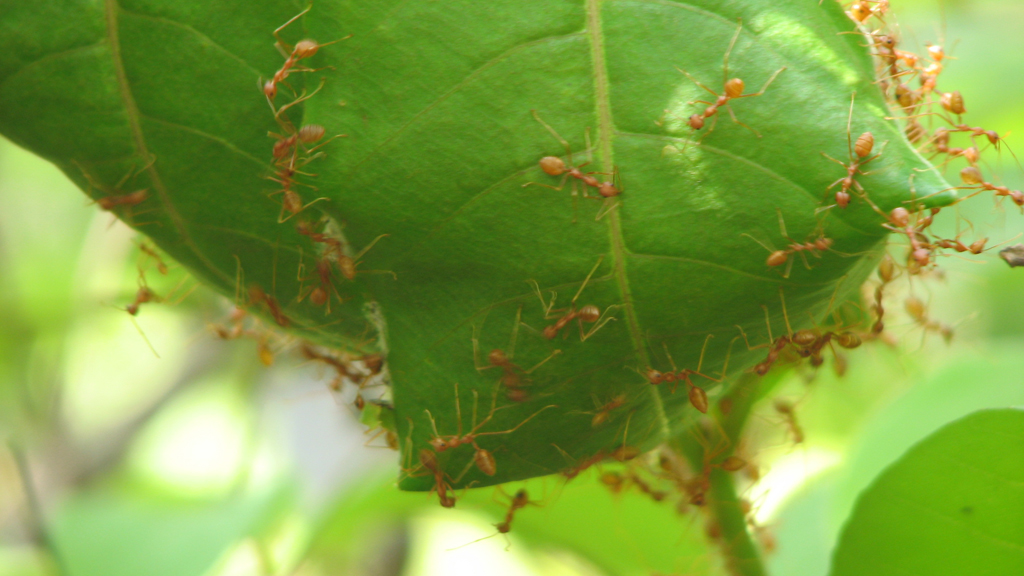

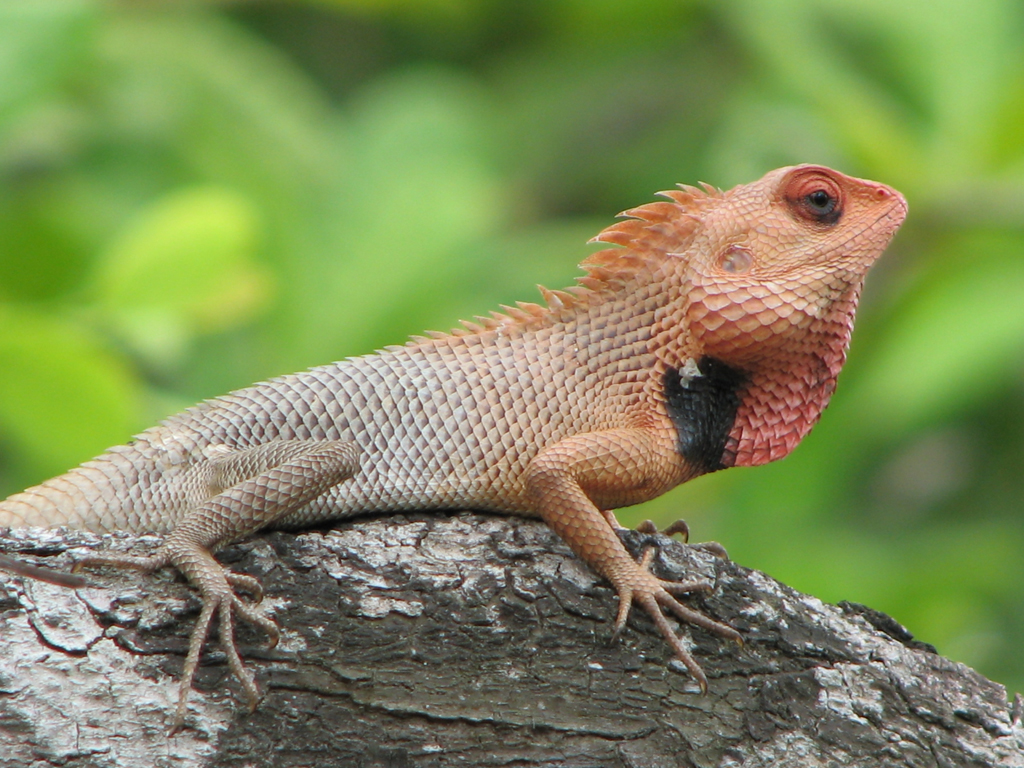
Chameleon

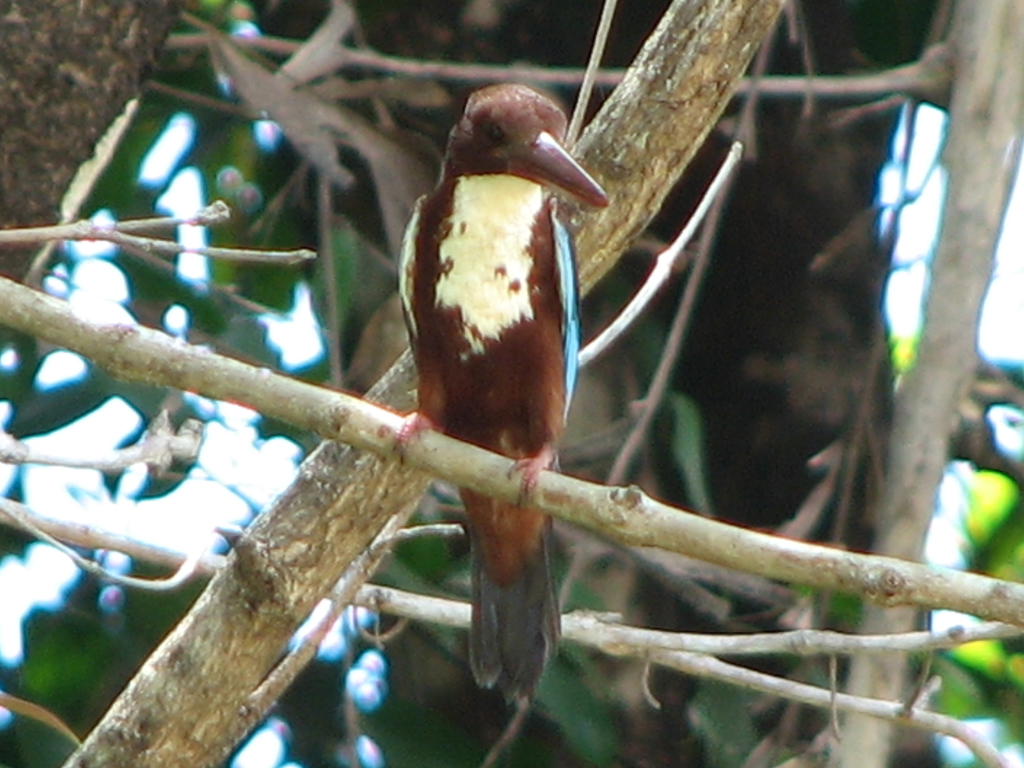
White throated kingfisher

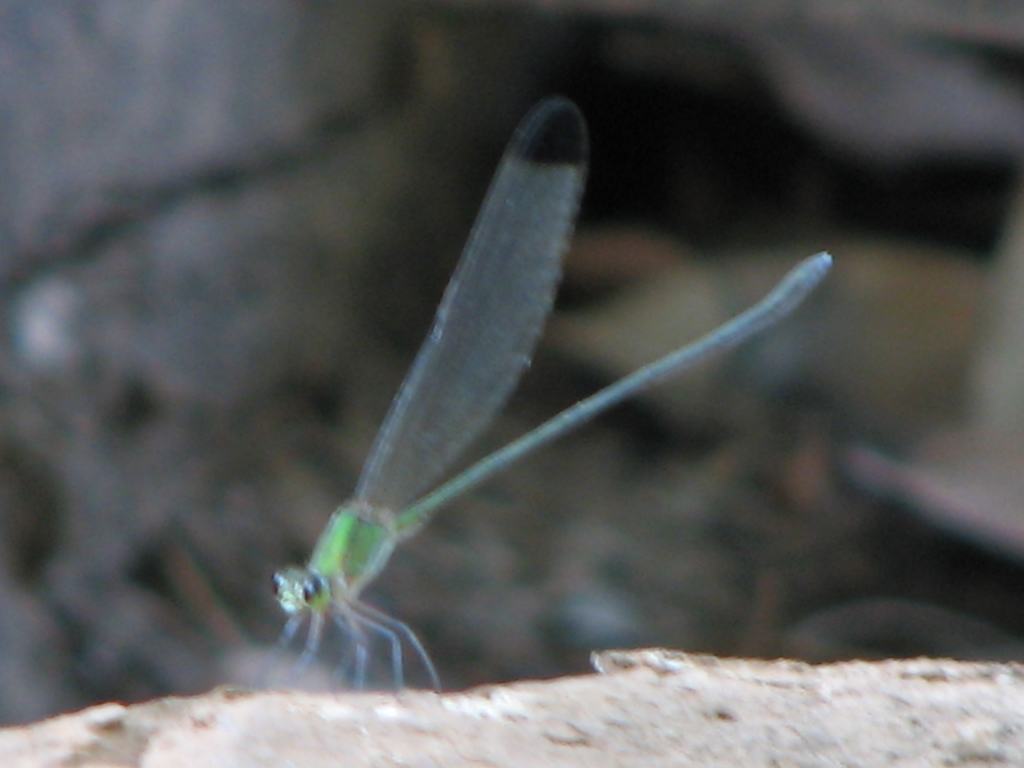

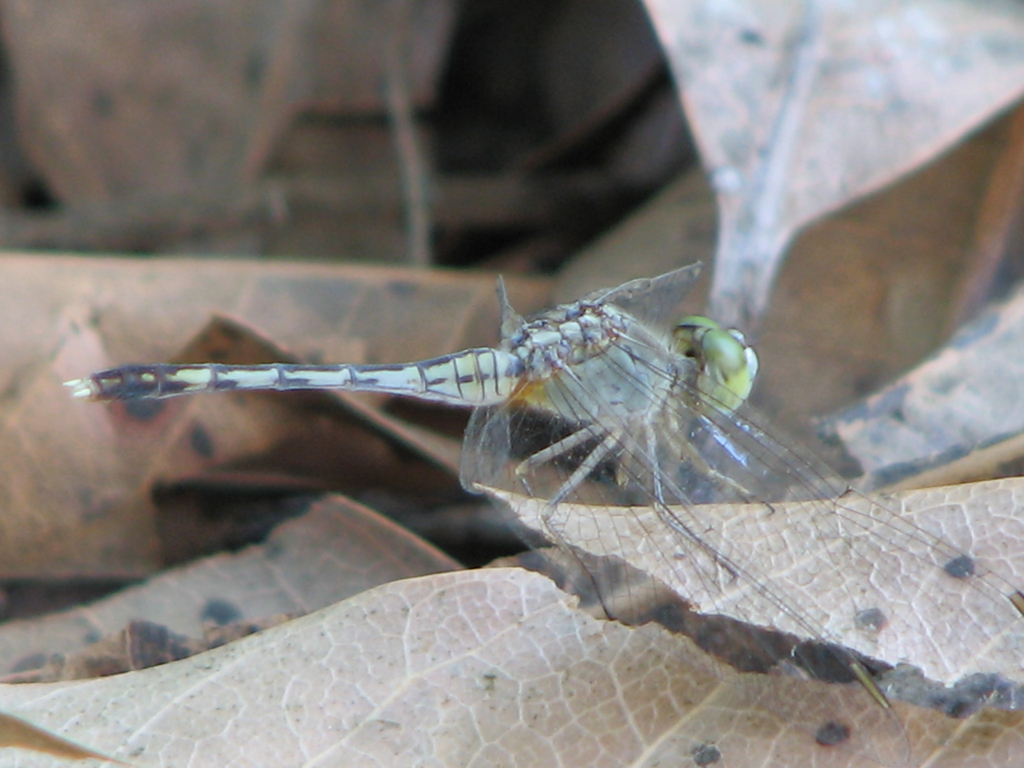

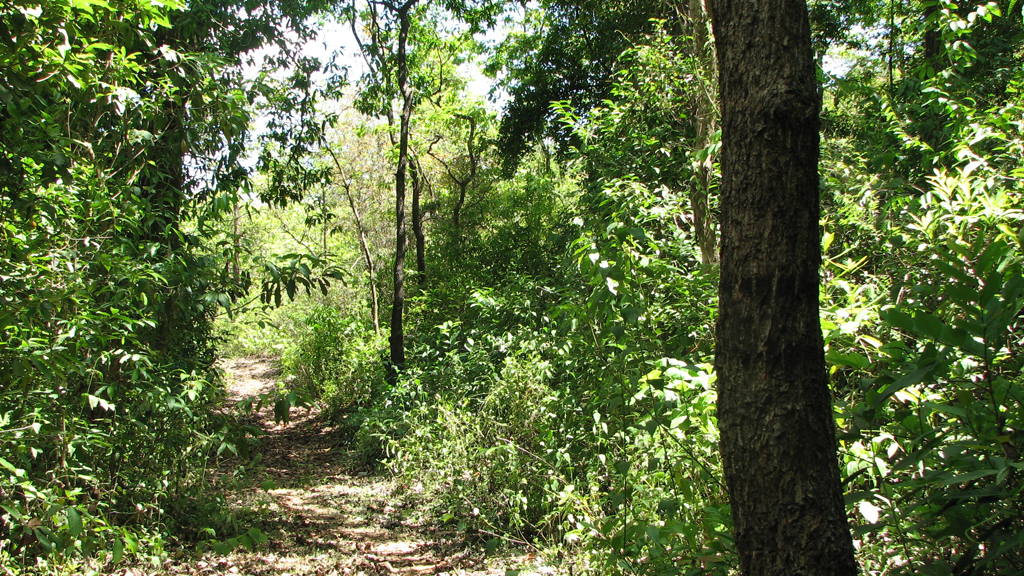

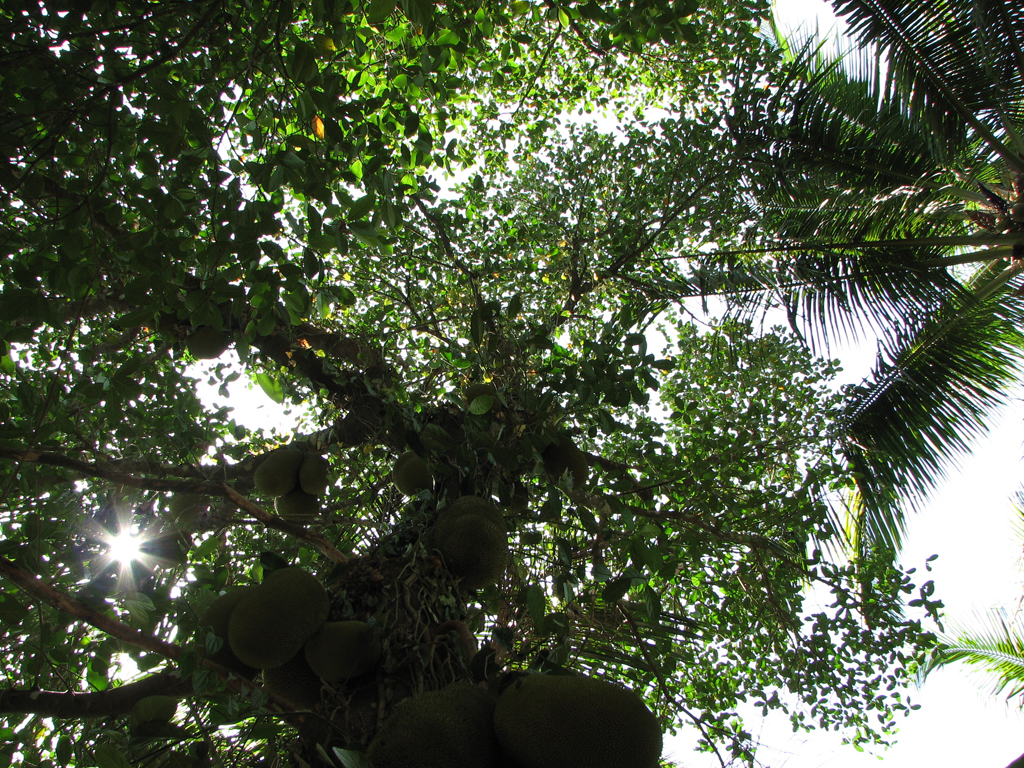

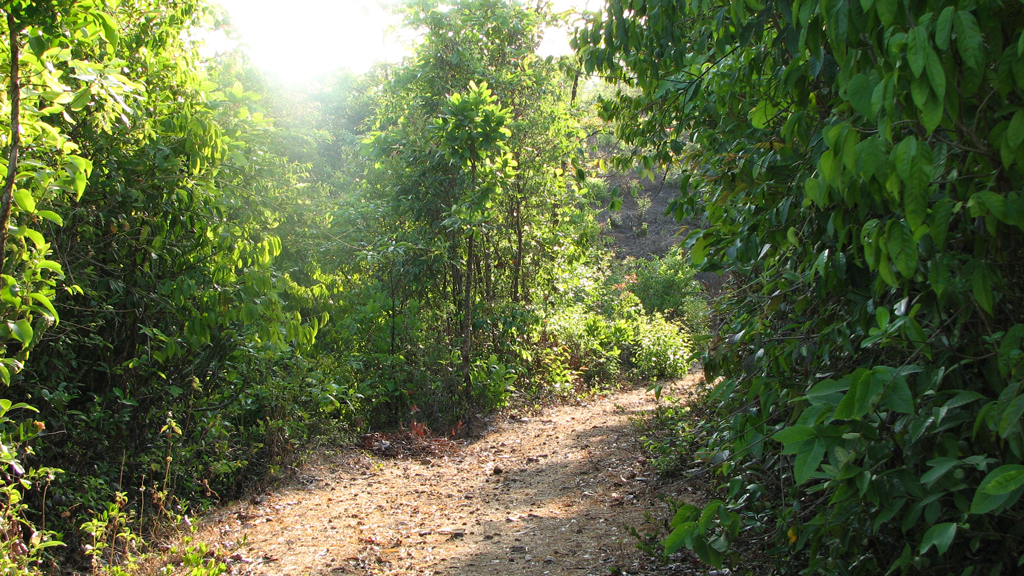

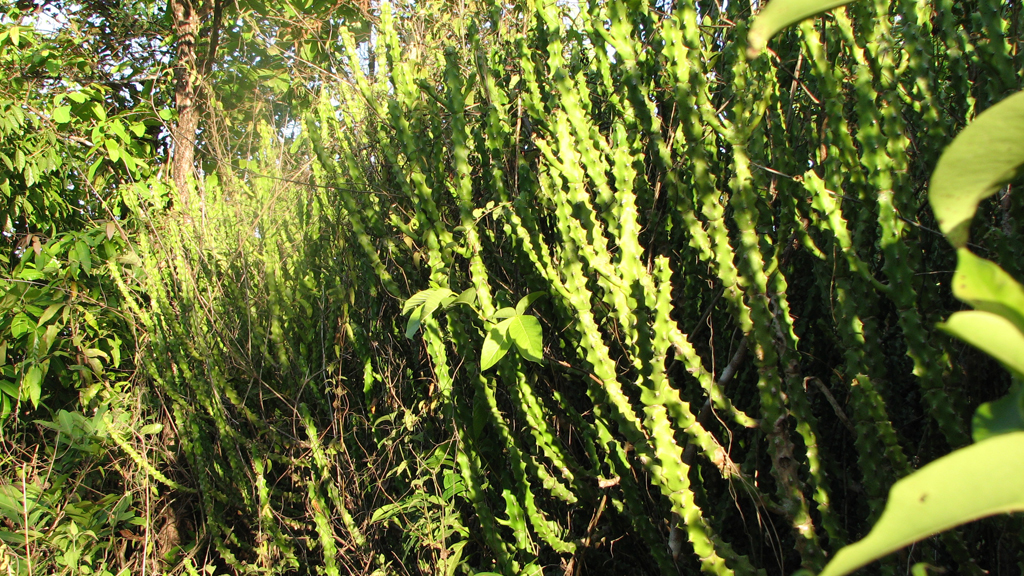
Cactus

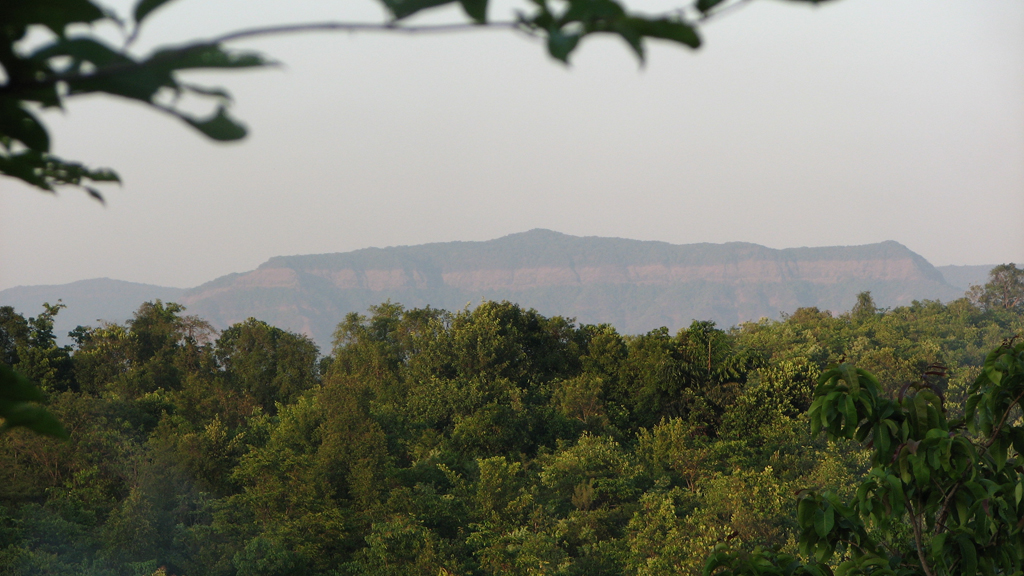

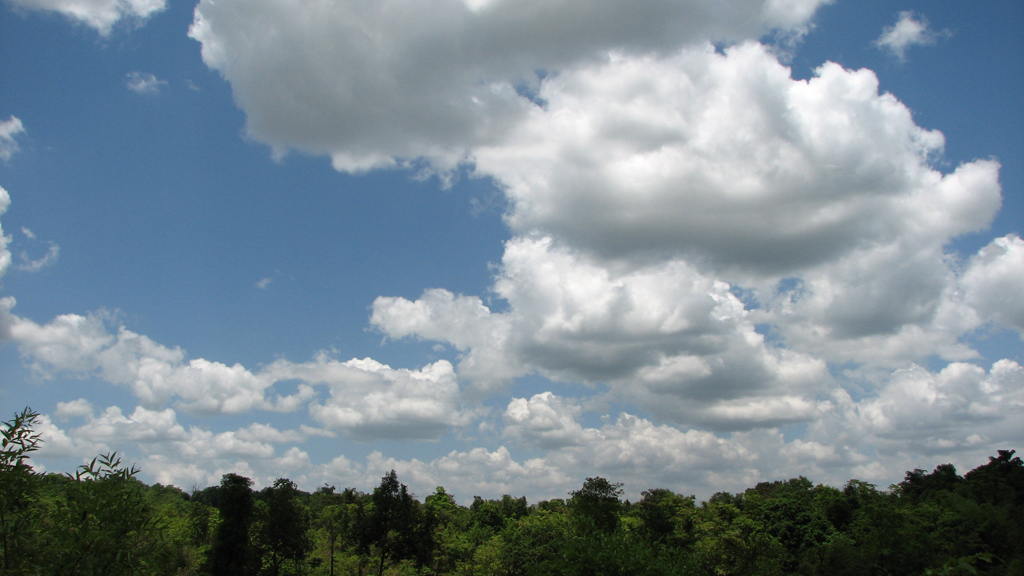

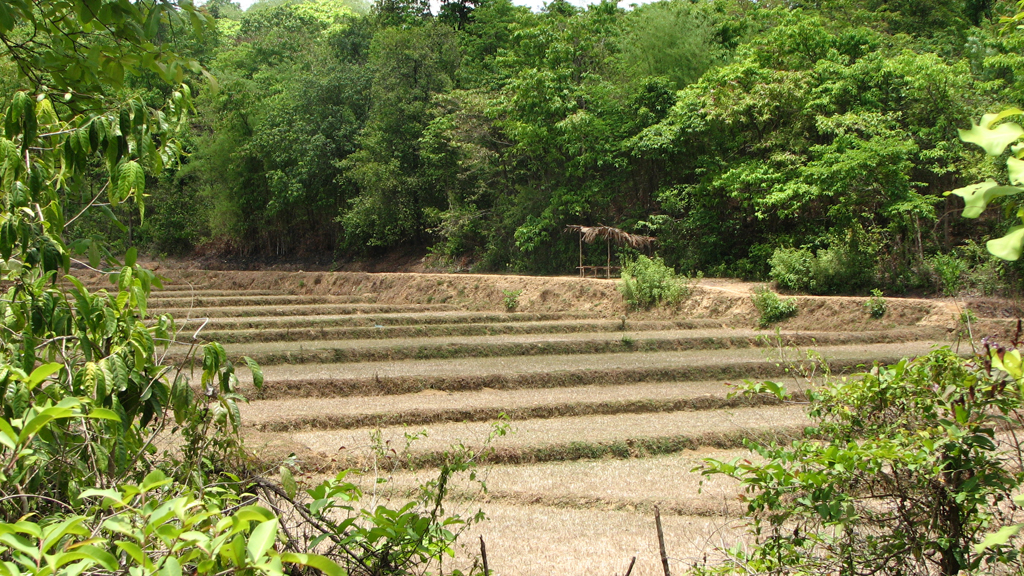

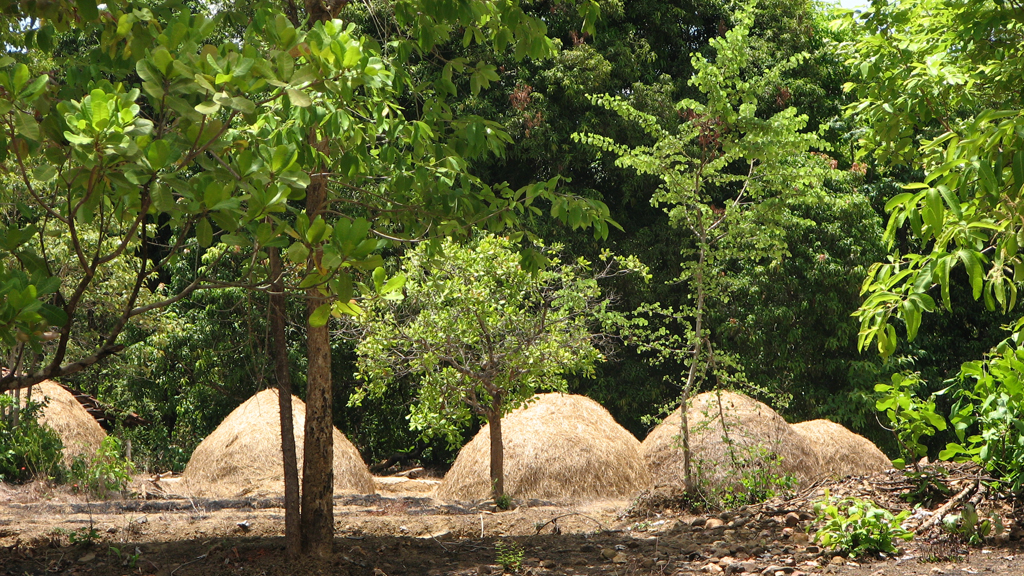

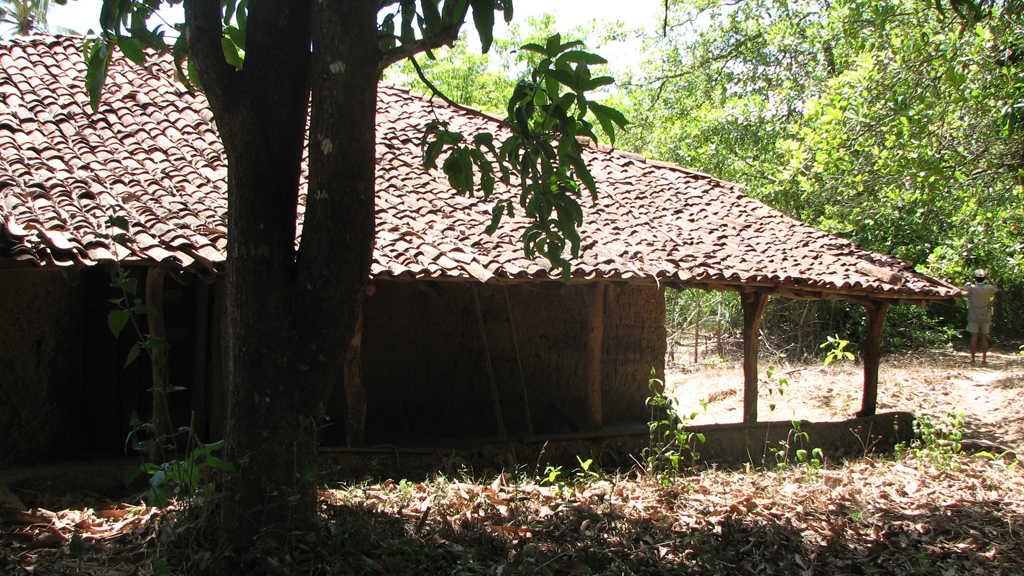

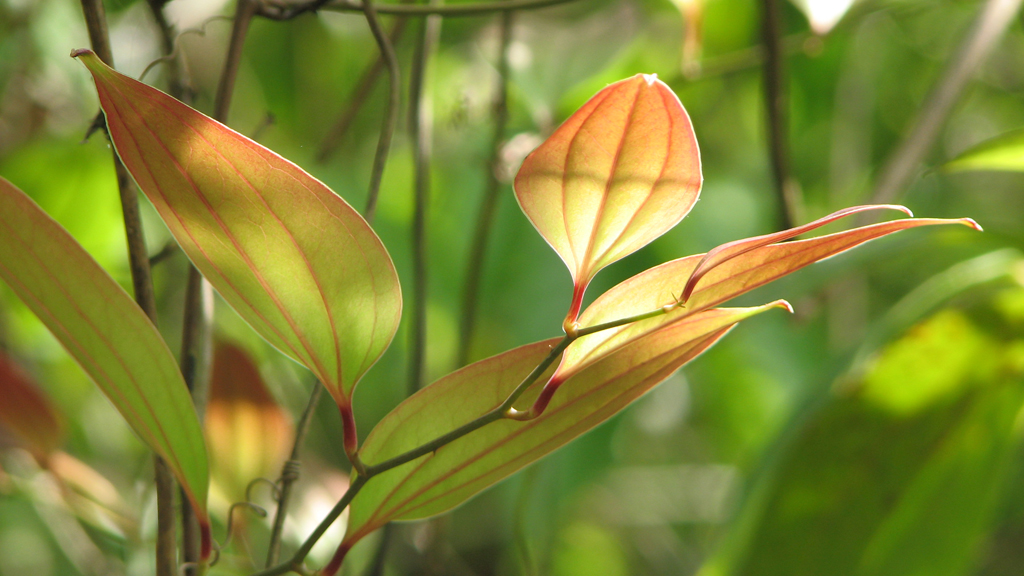

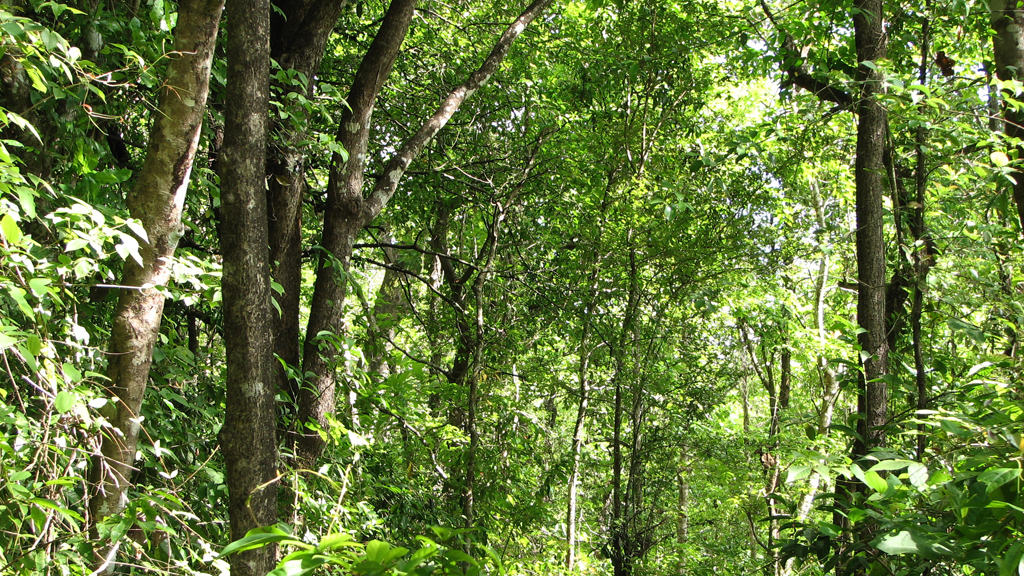

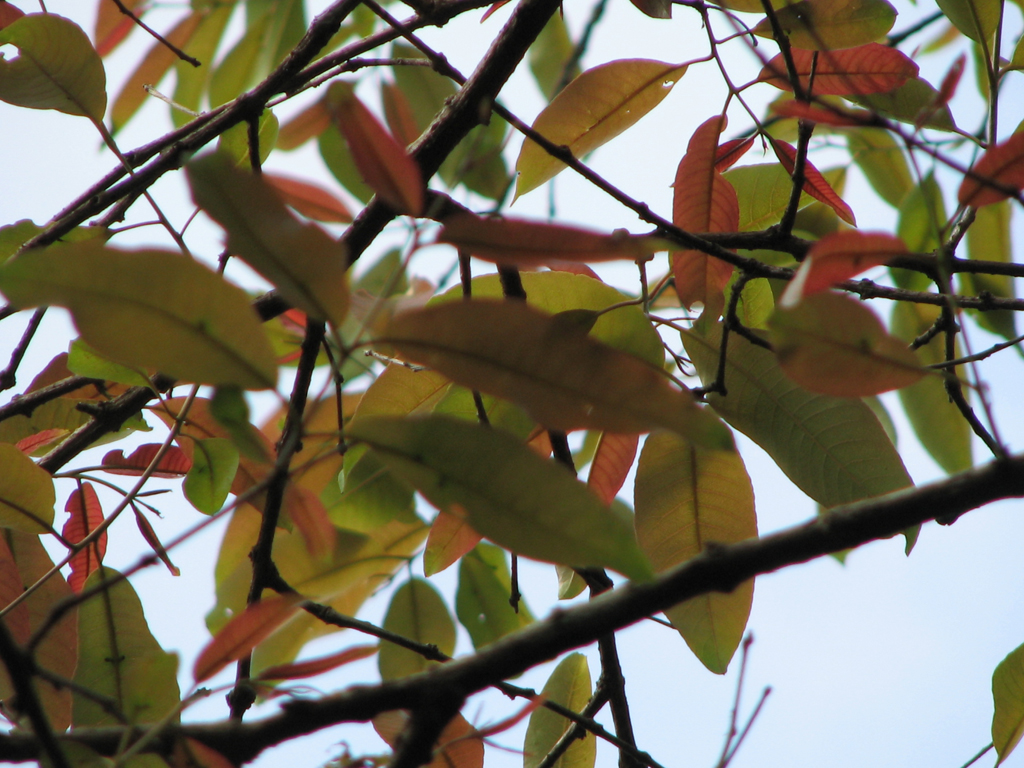

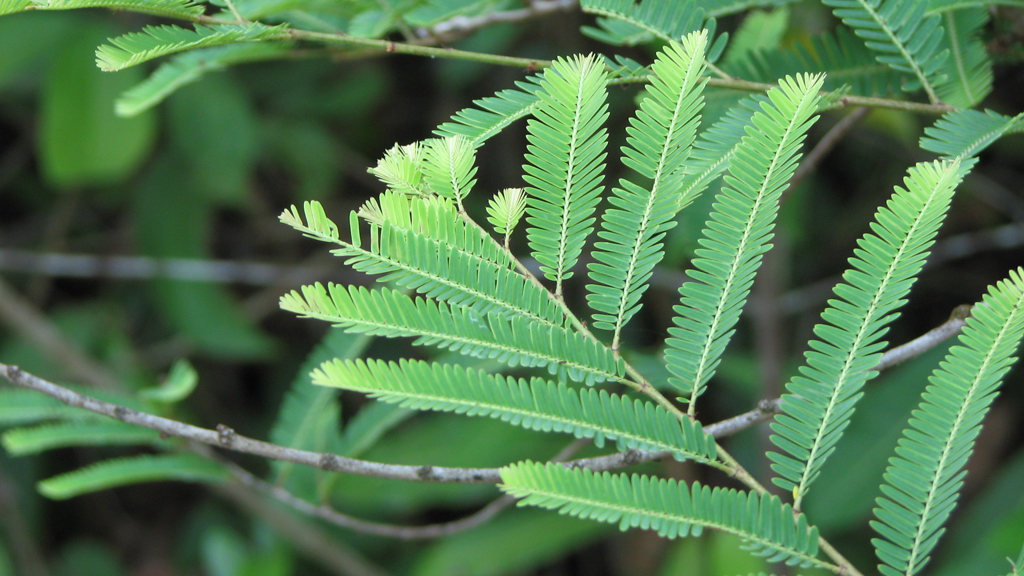

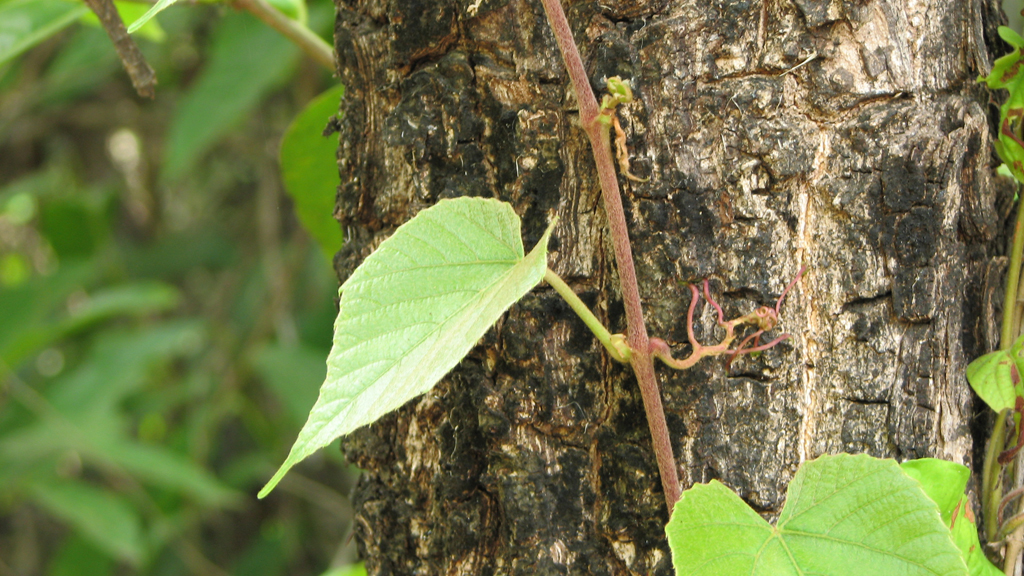

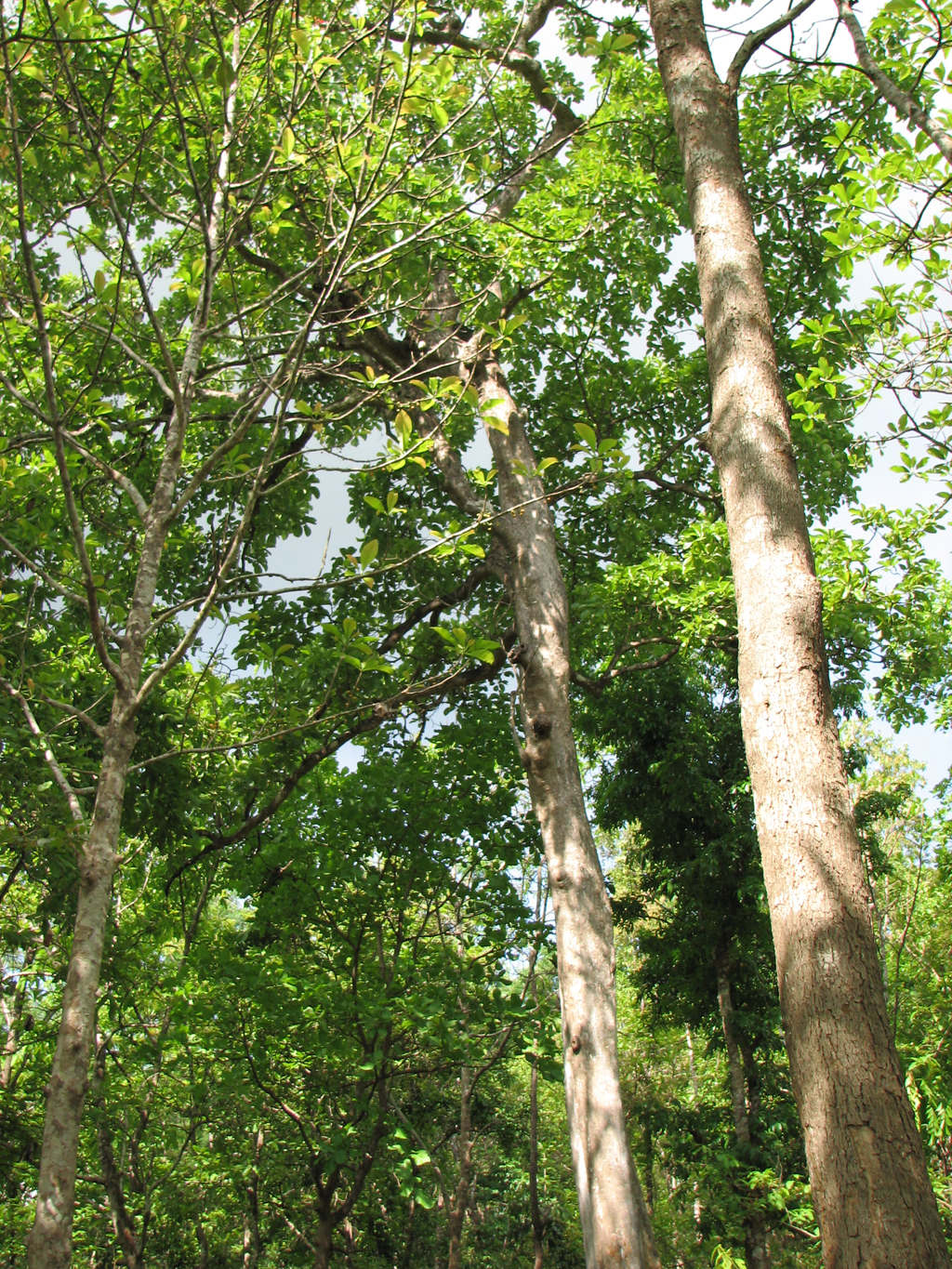

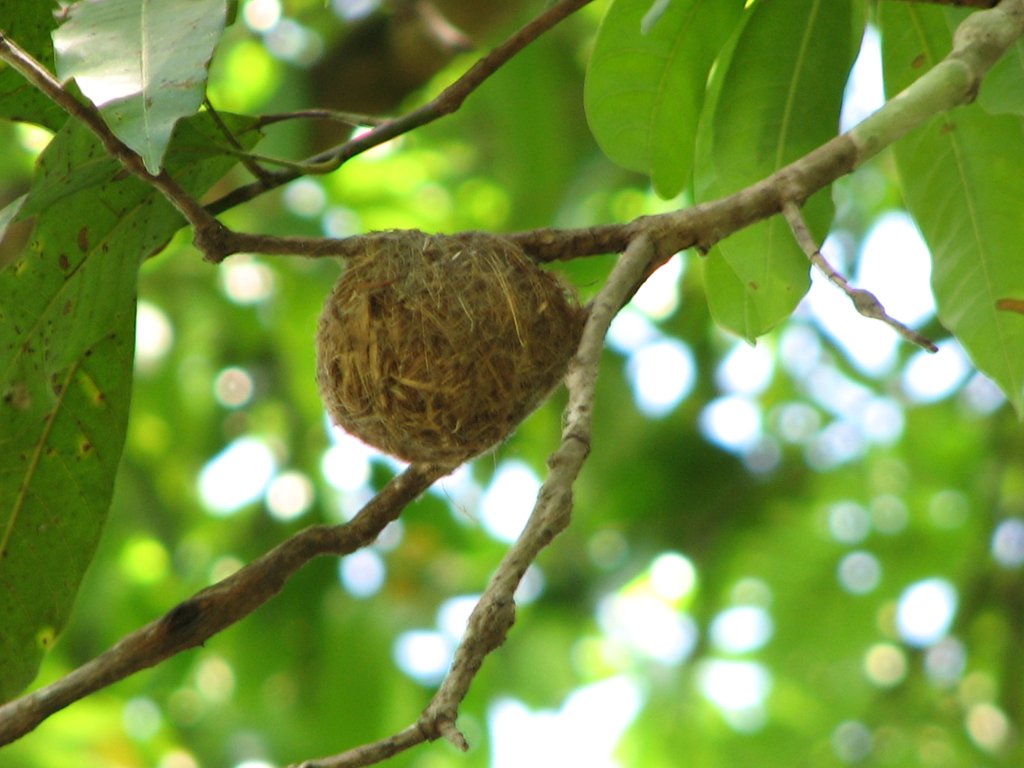

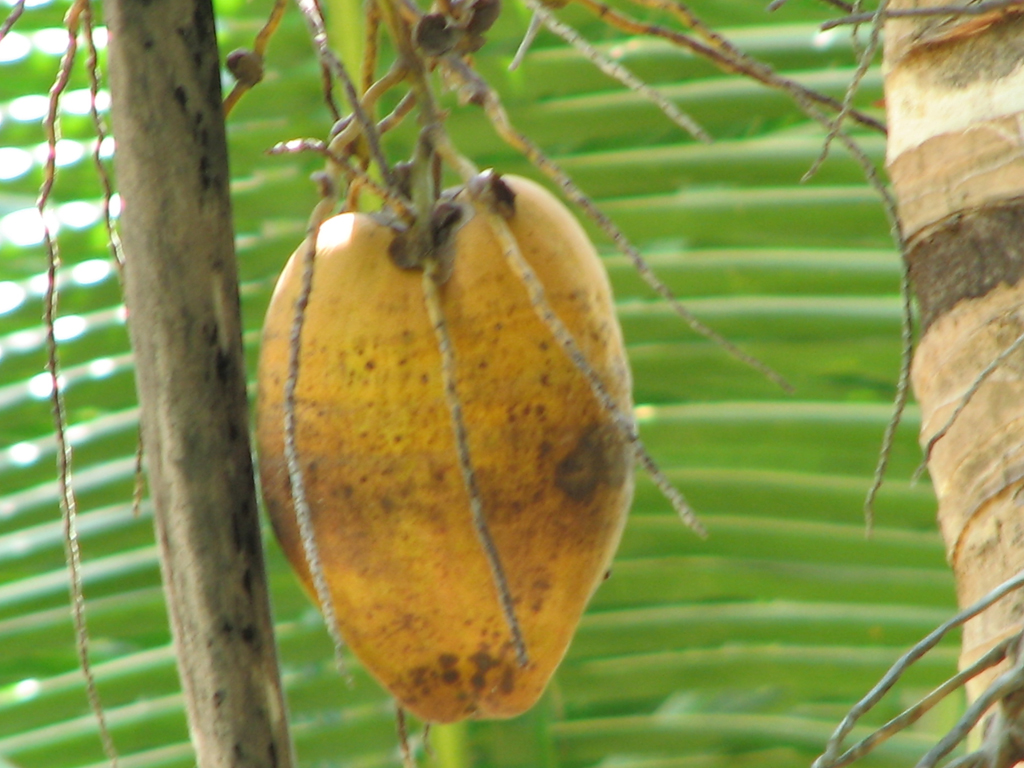

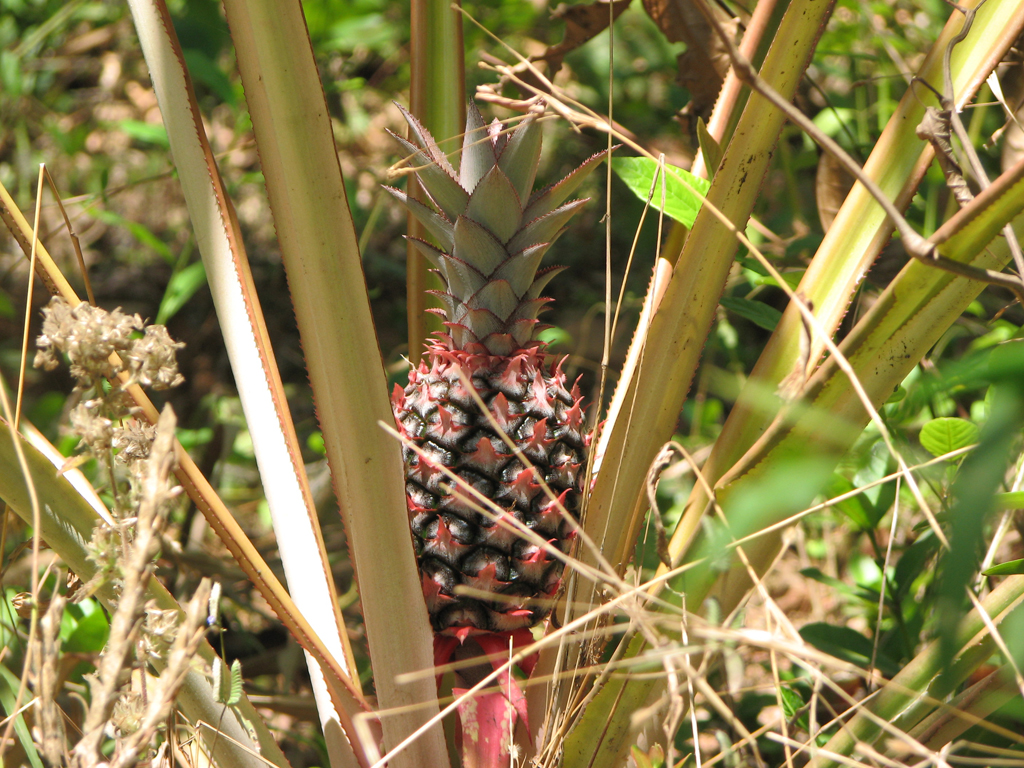

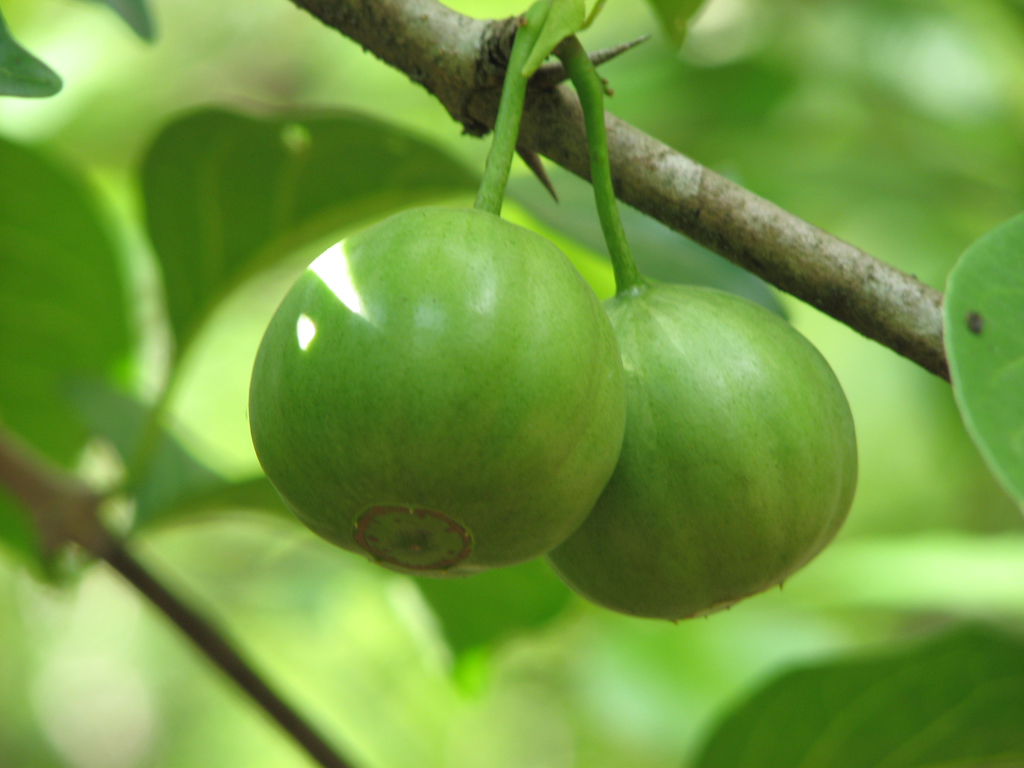

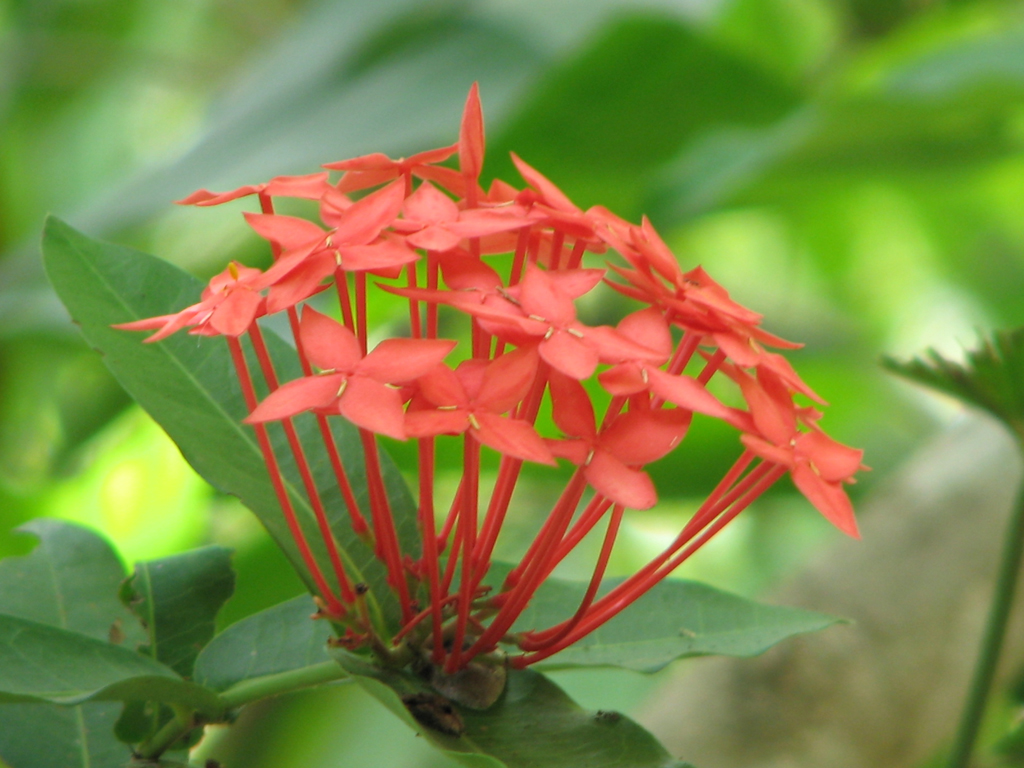

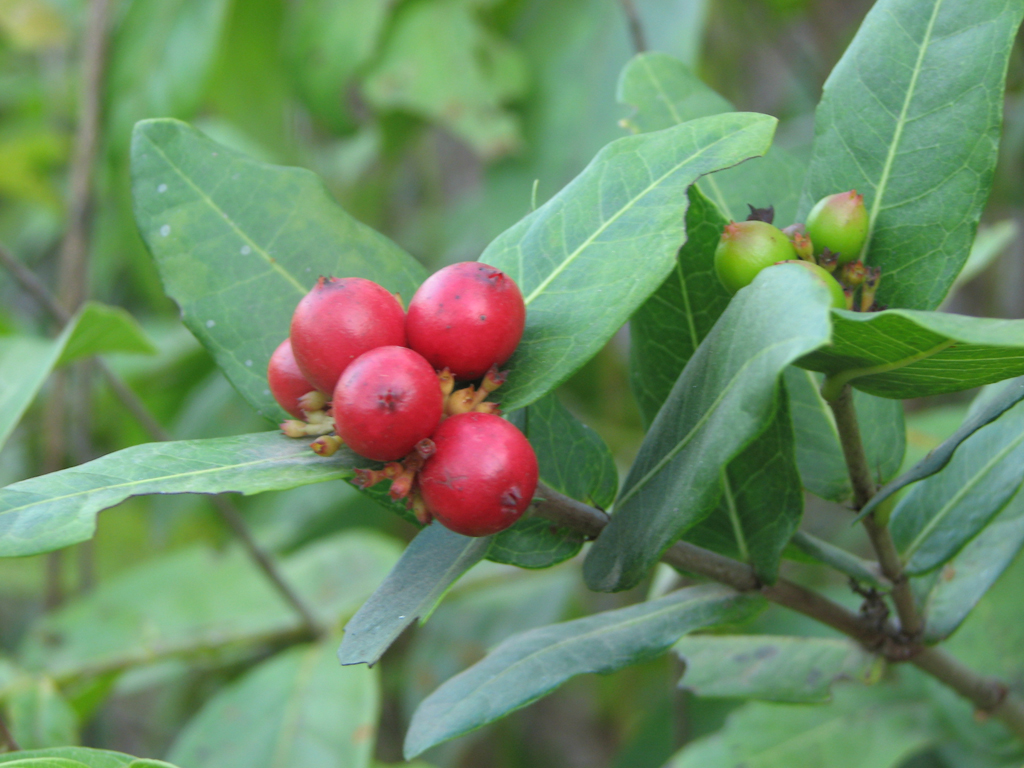

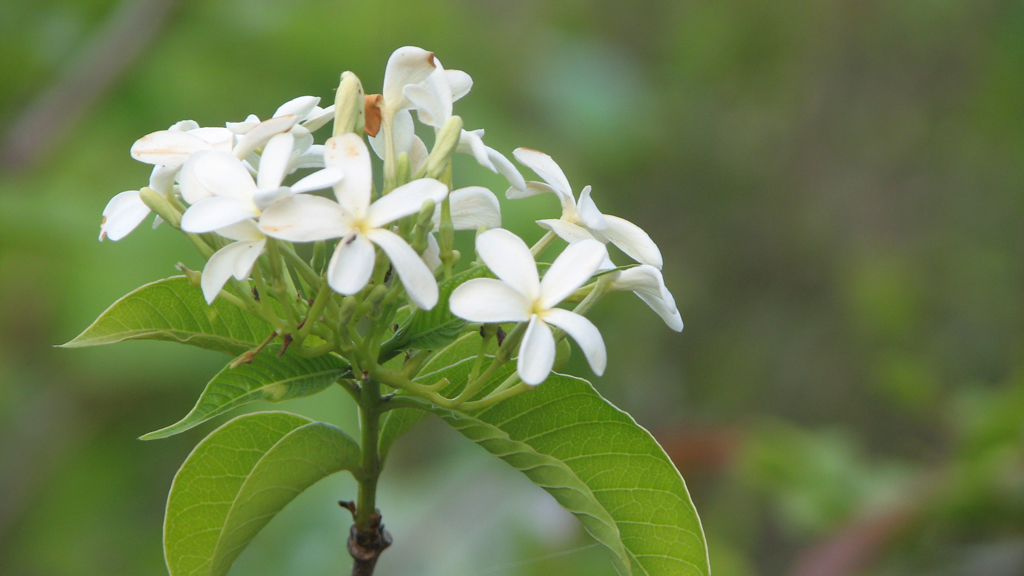

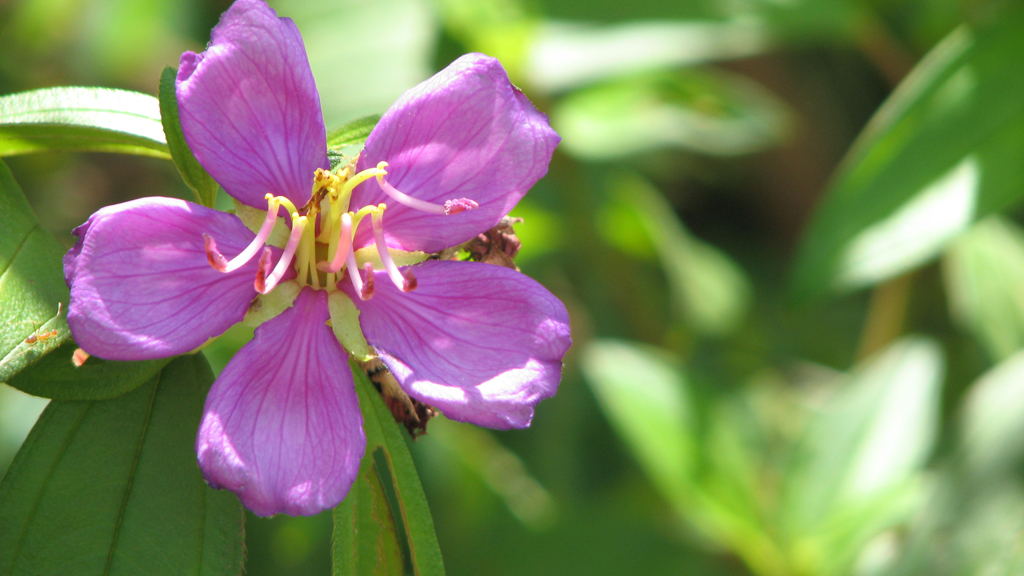

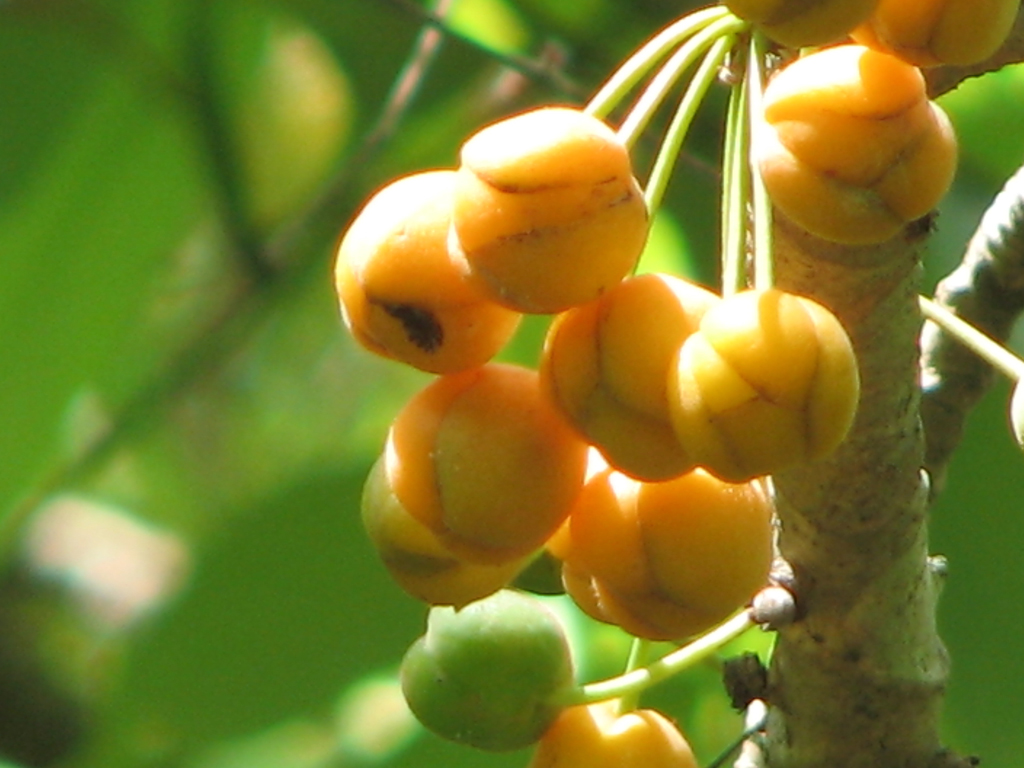

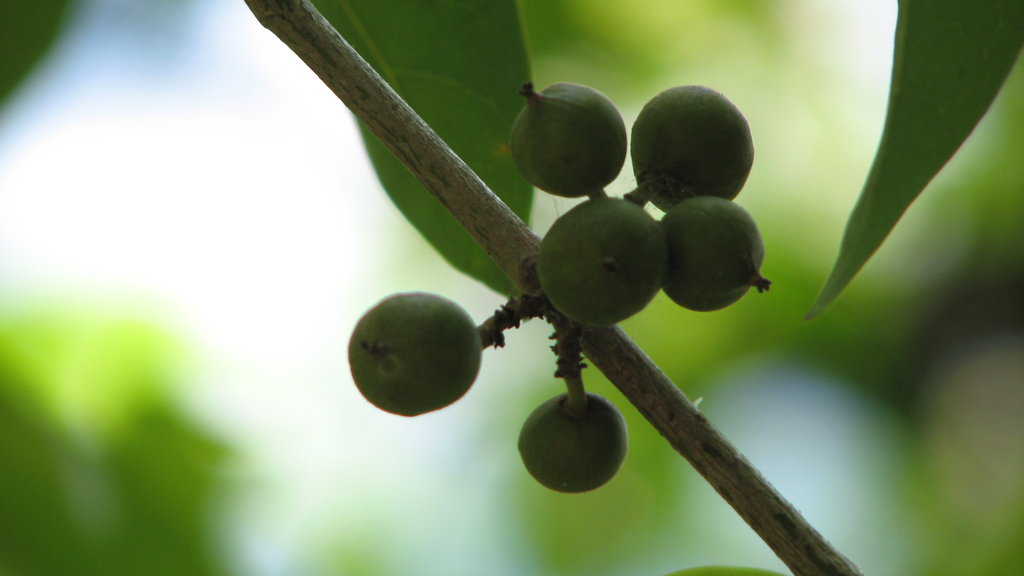

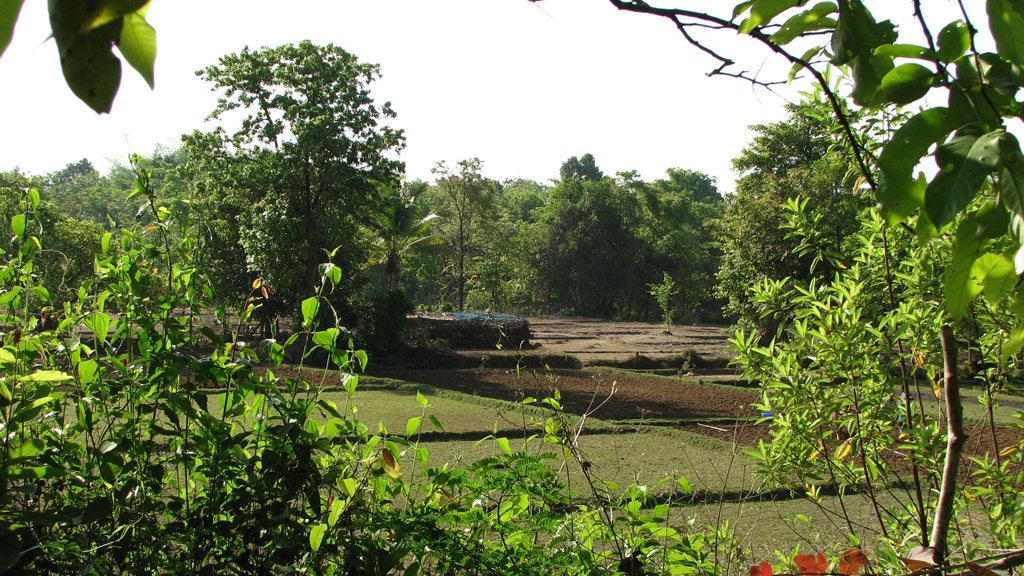

Shree Ravalnath mandeer

=== Education ===
- Z.P. School No.1 (From 1st to 7th Std)
- Z.P. School No.2 (From 1st to 7th Std)
- Z.P. School No.3 (From 1st to 4th Std)
- Z.P. School No.4 (From 1st to 4th Std)
- Shree Ralvanath Vidyamandeer (From 8th to 10th Std)

Satellite view of Tilari Dam
