= Redi =

Redi can refer to:

== People ==
=== Given name ===
- Redi Halilaj (born 1989), Albanian cyclist
- Redi Jupi (born 1974), Albanian footballer
- Redi Tlhabi, South African journalist, producer, author and radio presenter
- Redi Vogli (born 1987), Albanian basketball player

=== Surname ===
- Francesco Redi (1626–1697), Italian scientist
- Gino Redi (1908–1962), Italian composer
- Tommaso Redi (1665–1726), Italian painter who was active during the late-Baroque

=== Other names ===
- Raidi (born 1938), Tibetan politician known in Chinese as Rèdì

== Other uses ==
- REDi, American musical group
- Redi (crater), Martian impact crater
- Redi (shopping centre), a shopping mall in Helsinki, Finland
- Redi, Maharashtra, Indian village
  - Redi Port
- Redi Award, international science award in toxinology
- Thomson Reuters REDI, execution management system platform
- Redi, a village in Maharashtra state in India; known for the Ganapati Temple

== See also ==
- Redis (disambiguation)
