= Yashwantgad Fort =

Fort in Redi, Maharashtra, India

Yashwantgad
- Part of Kokan sea coast
- Sindhudurg district, Maharashtra

Site information
- Type: Sea fort
- Owner: India
- Controlled by: Bijapur (-1548); Portugal (1746-1754); Maratha Empire (1713-1765); United Kingdom: East India Company (1765-1857); British Raj (1857-1947); India (1947-)
- Open to the public: Yes
- Condition: good

Location
- Shown within Maharashtra
- Location within Maharashtra
- Coordinates: 15°45′10.3″N 73°39′55.7″E
- Height: 150 Ft.

Site history
- Materials: Black Basalt Stone

Yashwantgad Fort is located in Redi, Maharashtra, near the Maharashtra-Goa border. It sits on a small hill north of Terekhol Creek. The fort, now a tree-entangled ruin, overlooks the beaches of the southern Maharashtra coast.

== How to reach ==
The fort is located 33 km from Sawantwadi and 26 km from Vengurla. It is accessed through crumbling gateways that lead through the surrounding forest and past a deep trench encircling part of the structure. Upon reaching the main entrance, visitors will pass through several small rooms and corridors, where tree roots cascade over the fort's walls. These paths lead to the vast, roofless inner chambers of the citadel, which have long been reclaimed by nature. Animals such as langur monkeys and drongo birds can often be seen at the fort.

== History ==
In 610-611 AD, Redi was an important trading port under the Chalukya ruler Swamiraja. Redi Fort was built before the rise of the Marathas, with construction starting around 600 AD. Each successive ruler expanded the boundaries of the fort. The current fort walls extend to nearly a 1 km radius, but the original fort stretched from the north, where the Ganesh idol was discovered, to Kanlya Lake, and included Durgusa Island in the Arabian Sea. The fort was part of Admiral Kanhoji Angre's line of defenses, built for Maratha Queen Tarabai Bhosale.

The fort was captured by the Portuguese in 1746. The previous holders, the Sawant clan of Maharashtra, were desperate to regain control of it due to its valuable strategic position on the coast. An attempt to recapture Redi Fort involved poisoning the Portuguese garrison's fish supply, but the attack was unsuccessful. The fort was eventually returned to the Sawants following a peace treaty, but their success was short-lived. In 1765, the fort was captured by the British, who later sold the land to locals in 1890, while retaining ownership of the fort walls.

In 2012, the fort was owned by Vishwanath R. Patki, whose family had been "given the land and the fort as a gift by the erstwhile British government in the late 1800s for services rendered," according to B.V. Kulkarni, Deputy Director of the Directorate of Archaeology & Museums, Maharashtra. In 2016, the fort was declared a protected monument. "Now it is in our control, and we shall prepare a long-term conservation plan, which will eventually make it a tourist attraction," Kulkarni said.

== Places to see ==
The fort covers an area of three hectares and is built on two levels. The Lower Fort, the larger of the two, has its base touching the creek and contains a freshwater well. The Upper Fort, situated on a hillock, is smaller and was used to keep watch over maritime activities in the surrounding waters. A dry moat, 20 feet deep, surrounds the fort. There are four gates that must be passed to enter the fort, with the entrance gates and guard vestibules still in good condition. The Balekilla, or Sanctum Sanctorum, is like a jigsaw puzzle, with many buildings and wards still well-preserved.

== Gallery ==
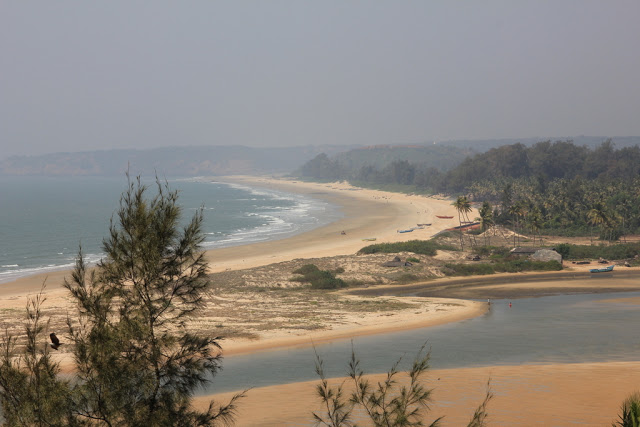
Sea side view from fort

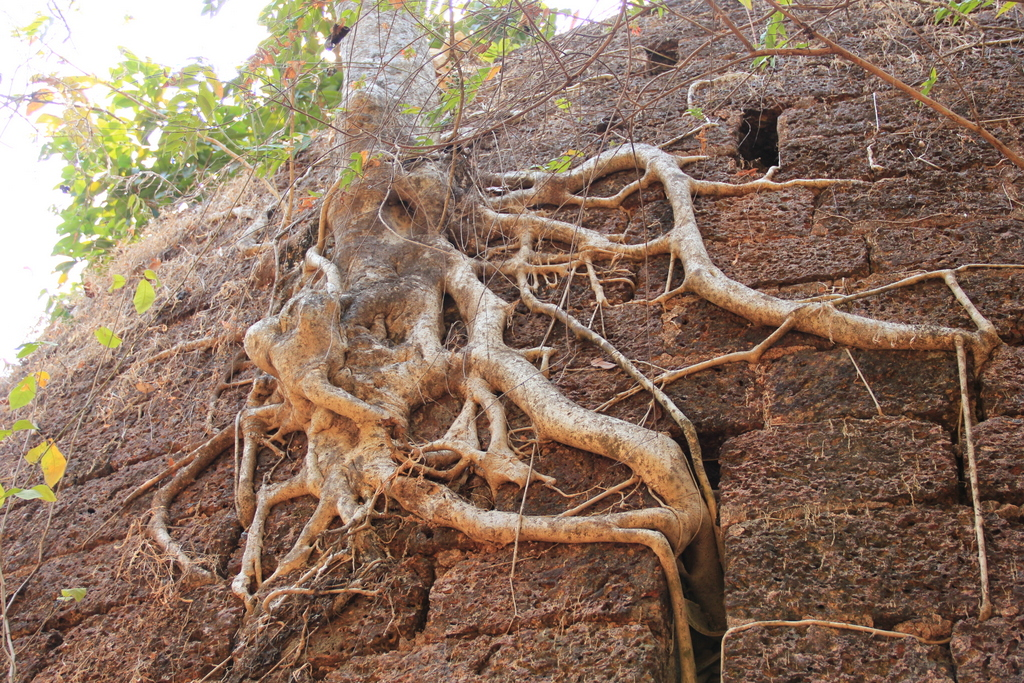
Yashwantgad Fort ruins

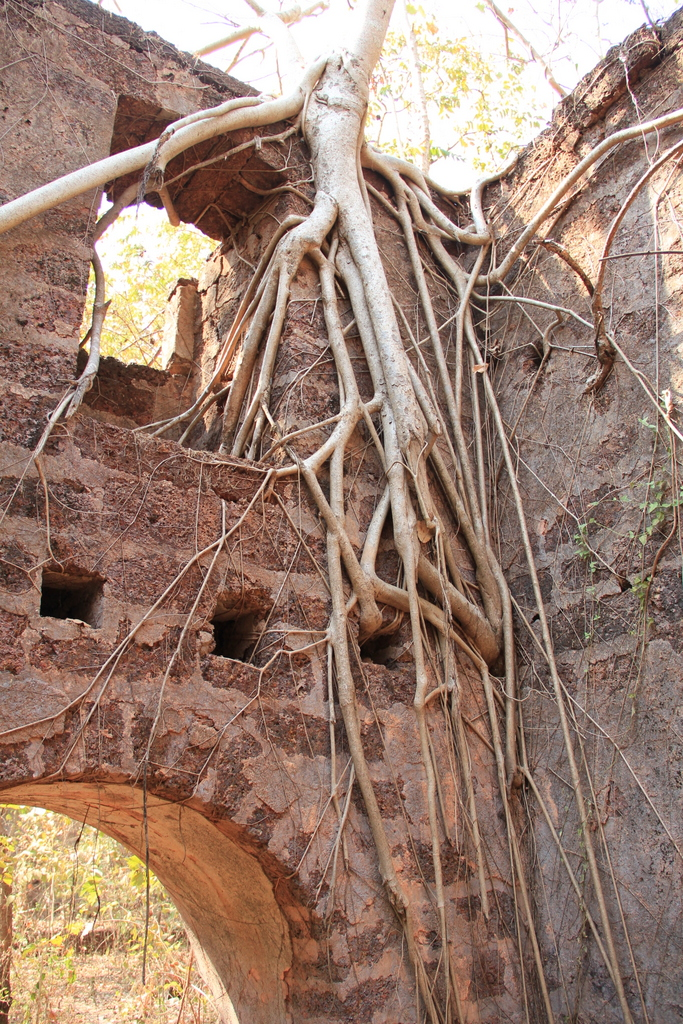
Yashwantgad Fort ruins

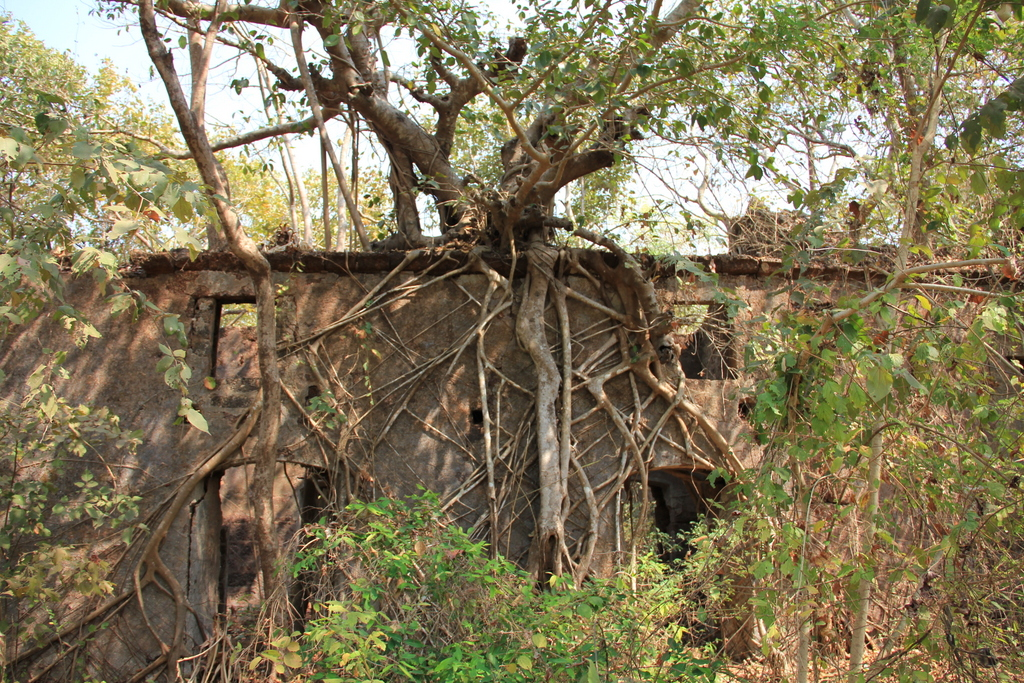
Yashwantgad Fort ruins

== See also ==
- Battles involving the Maratha Empire
- Ganapati Temple, Redi
- List of forts in India
- List of forts in Maharashtra
- List of Maratha dynasties and states
- Maratha War of Independence
- Maratha titles
- Marathi People
- Military history of India
- Sawantwadi State
