= Asoli =

Village in Maharashtra, India

- Village
- Nickname: Asoli Gaon
- Location in Maharashtra, India
- Coordinates: 15.8050°N 73.6808°E
- Country: India
- State: Maharashtra
- District: Sindhudurg
- Taluka: Vengurla

Government
  - Tahasildar, Vengurla: Smt. Vaishali Patil

Population (2008)
  - Total: 5,064

Languages
  - Official: Marathi
- Time zone: UTC+5:30 (IST)
- PIN: 416 518
- Telephone code: 02366
- Vehicle registration: MH 07
- Website: sindhudurg.nic.in

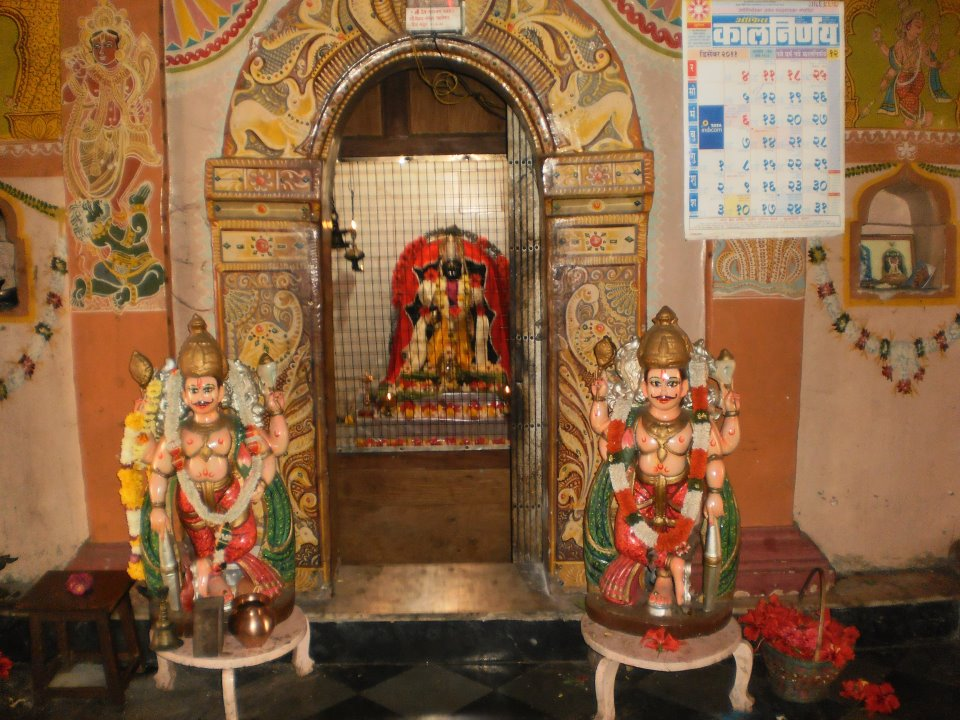
Dev Narayan Prasana

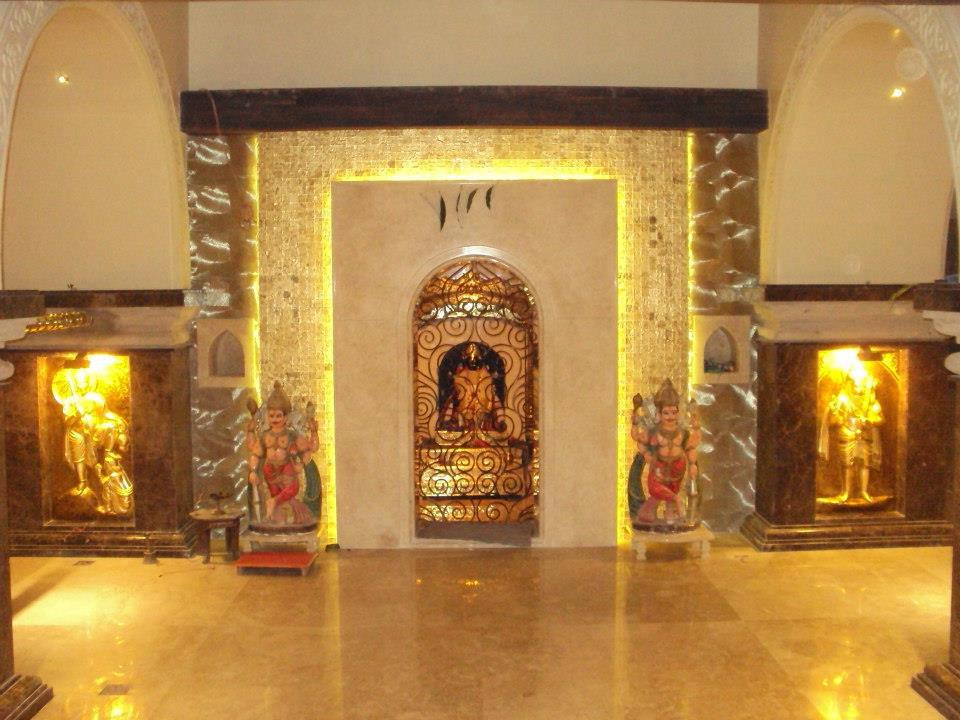
Current photo

Asoli is a small village in Taluka Vengurla and district Sindhudurg of Maharashtra, India.

The Gram daivath (Village God) is Shree Dev Narayan.

Sindhudurg is an administrative district in the state of Maharashtra in India, which was carved out of the erstwhile Ratnagiri District. The district headquarters are located at Oros. The district occupies an area of 5207 km^{2} and has a population of 868,825 of which 9.47% were urban (as of 2001).

== Location ==
Sindhudurg is bordered on the north by Ratnagiri District, on the south by the state of Goa, on the west by the Arabian Sea, and to the east across the crest of the Western Ghats or Sayadhris is Kolhapur District. Sindhudurg is part of Konkan (coastal) region, a narrow coastal plain in western Maharashtra which lies between the Western Ghats and the Arabian Sea. literacy in this district is around 80%.

== Climate ==
Asoli has a semi-tropical climate and remains warm and humid in most of the year. It has three clear seasons: Rainy (June - October), winter (November-mid February) and Summer (mid-February–May). Temperatures vary between Max. 32 °C and monsoon winds bring heavy rains (average rainfall 3240.10 mm).

== Divisions ==
The 8 talukas of this district are Devgad, Kankavli, Malvan, Kudal, Savantwadi, Vengurla and Dodamarg and Vaibhavwadi.

There are 3 Vidhan Sabha constituencies in this district. These are Sawantwadi, Kudal and Kankavli. All of these are part of the Ratnagiri-Sindhudurg Lok Sabha constituency.

== Notes ==
- Sindhudurg district official website
- Sindhudurg Sightseeing
- Website of Vengurla
- Tourist information on Sindhudurg
- Tourists Information about malvan
