= Redi Port =

Redi रेडी बंदर
- Sea Port
- Etymology: Rewati Port
- Location in Maharashtra, India
- Coordinates: 15.744611°N 73.653391°E
- Country: India
- State: Maharashtra
- District: Sindhudurg
- Taluka: Vengurla
- Time zone: UTC+5:30 (IST)

Redi Port is a port located at a village Redi in the Konkan coast. Yashwantgad fort and Ganesh temple are the other attractions in this tiny coastal village.

== Location ==
The existing port at Redi village is located along the Konkan Coast in Vengurla taluka of Sindhudurg district. Located at 205 nautical miles south of Mumbai, the site lies 85 km north of Goa and 150 km south of Ratnagiri.

There are two jetties functioning in the port at present that are being used only for lighterage operations. Presently iron ore is being handled at Redi Port. The proposed site has got the advantage of being located immediately south of Rainy Point amidst the shelter formed by rocky projections.

== Economy ==
The first phase of port project consists of seven berths, attracting an investment of approximately 950 crores. This port is expected to handle about 33 MTPA, when fully operational.
