= Redi, Maharashtra =

Village in Maharashtra

Redi
- Village
- Etymology: Rewati
- Location in Maharashtra, India Redi (India)
- Coordinates: 15.7402346°N 73.6769342°E
- Country: India
- State: Maharashtra
- District: Sindhudurg
- Taluka: Vengurla
- Origin: Before 10th Century

Government
  - Type: Democracy
  - Body: Village Panchayat
- Elevation: 11 m (36 ft)

Languages
  - Official: Marathi
  - Regional: Malvani
- Time zone: UTC+5:30 (IST)
- Vehicle registration: MH-07

Redi is a village in the district of Sindhudurg in Maharashtra. Originally known as Rewati nagar, Redi is located close to the shores of the Arabian Sea. Cashew and coconut trees grow in the region.

The village belongs to the Vengurla Taluka of the Konkan region and was a significant sea port during the earlier times. Redi has now evolved into a tourist hub because of its long virgin and unspoiled beaches alongside archaic historic monuments like the Yashwantgad Fort. Redi is merely 566 km away from Mumbai and can be easily reached.

Mauli devi from redi village is considered to be the queen of 360 villages of kokan. She has great importance and respect locally. Devotees offer prayers and offering to get fulfill their wishes.

== History ==
Redi was built in 16th century and was ruled by Marathas, was captured by the Portuguese. The previous citadel-holders, the Sawant clan of Maharashtra, attempted to recapture Redi by poisoning the Portuguese garrison's fish supply, but the attack was unsuccessful.

Redi was eventually returned to the Sawants following a peace treaty, but the peace was short-lived; in 1765 the fort was captured by the British who sold the land to local people in 1890 while retaining ownership of the Redi fort walls.

Actual spiritual history of redi village is that, Redi village was found by lord Bhadnavasa and was built within one night with the help of dandekar devata on the orders of the main deity of the village goddess mauli.

Great spiritual personalities like Pandavas Ani navnath are said to be passed through redi as there are marks kept by them still present in redi.

== Geography ==
Redi is located at 15.7402346°N 73.6769342°E. It has an average elevation of 11 metres (36 ft). Areas included are Kanyal, Gavtale, Bomdojichiwadi, Sukhalbhatwadi, Mhartalewadi, Hudawadu. The nearest town to the village, Shiroda, is.8 km (5.0 mi) away.

== Landmarks ==
The Swayambhu Shiv Temple, the Ganesha Temple, the Mauli Temple, the Rampurush Temple and the Navadurga Temple – where Goddess Durga is worshipped - are located in Red. The Yashwantgad Fort, Aravali and the Terekhol Fort are local historic monuments.

== Climate ==
Redi features a tropical monsoon climate, and is warm throughout the year. The highest temperature in summer reaches 34 °C (93 °F) while in winter, temperatures drop to 8 °C (46 °F).

== Language ==
Malvani is spoken as a local language. Marathi, the state language, is also understood and implemented.

== Culture ==
=== Festivals ===
The biggest festival celebrated in redi village is saptah of redi village. Saptah is the festival celebrated for 8 days in the month of shravan. It is the most famous festival of the locality.

Ganesh Chaturthi is the second biggest festival in the village. Being the place of one of Maharashtra's Ganesh temples, Ganesh Chaturthi has an important place in people's lives. In Redi, most Hindu families install their own small clay statues for worship on Ganesh Chaturthi. The idol is worshiped every morning and evening until the "departure". The daily worship ceremonies end with the worshipers singing the Aarti in honor of Ganesh, other Gods and saints by visiting each one's home in the village who has ongoing celebrations. As per the tradition of their respective families, the domestic celebrations come to an end after 1, 3, 5, 7, 11 or 21 days.

=== Cuisine ===
Cuisine covers a range from mild to very spicy dishes. Rice, vegetables, lentils and fruit are staple foods. Popular dishes include fish curry and rice. Meals (mainly lunch and dinner) are served on a plate called thali or occasionally on Patravali or Banana leaf. Each food item served on the thali has a specific place. In some households, meals begin with a thanksgiving offering of food (Naivedya) to the household Gods. The cuisine is of Maharashtrian-Goan type called Malvani (Konkani). There is extensive use of seafood and coconut, as it is locally available. The staple foods of the Konkani people are rice and fish.

== Transport ==
Redi is connected to other parts of Maharashtra state by MSRTC buses. Local sharing rickshaw, known as six-seaters in the region, are used widely by the people and connect smaller places. Konkan Railway Corporation Limited's railway line connecting Mumbai to Mangalore, popularly known as the Konkan Railway, is at 27 km (17 mi) from the village. Redi port is also used for water transport of iron and manganese ore. Mopa Airport in Goa, and Sindhudurg Airport in Vengurla, are 1 hour by road.

== Images of Redi ==

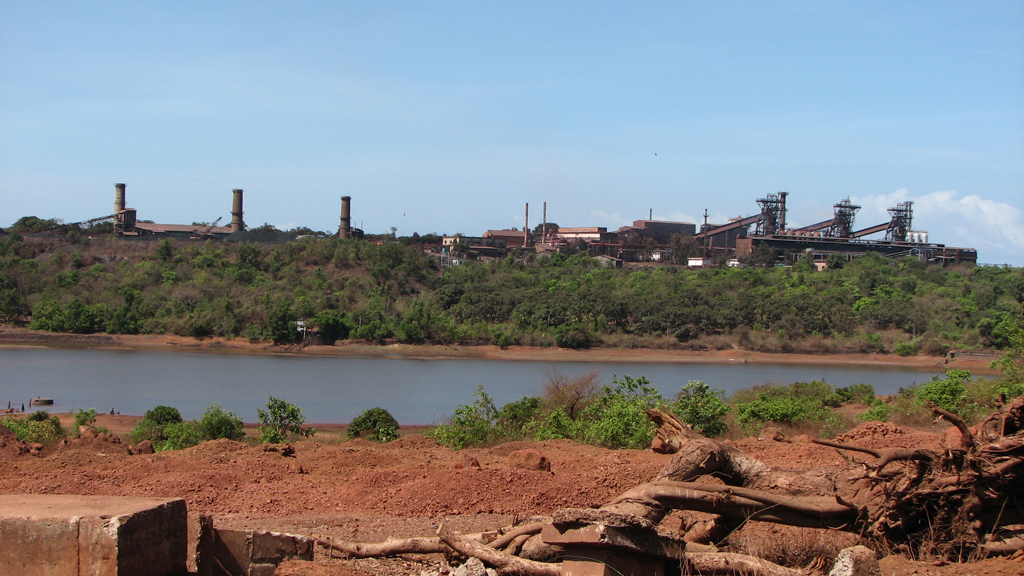

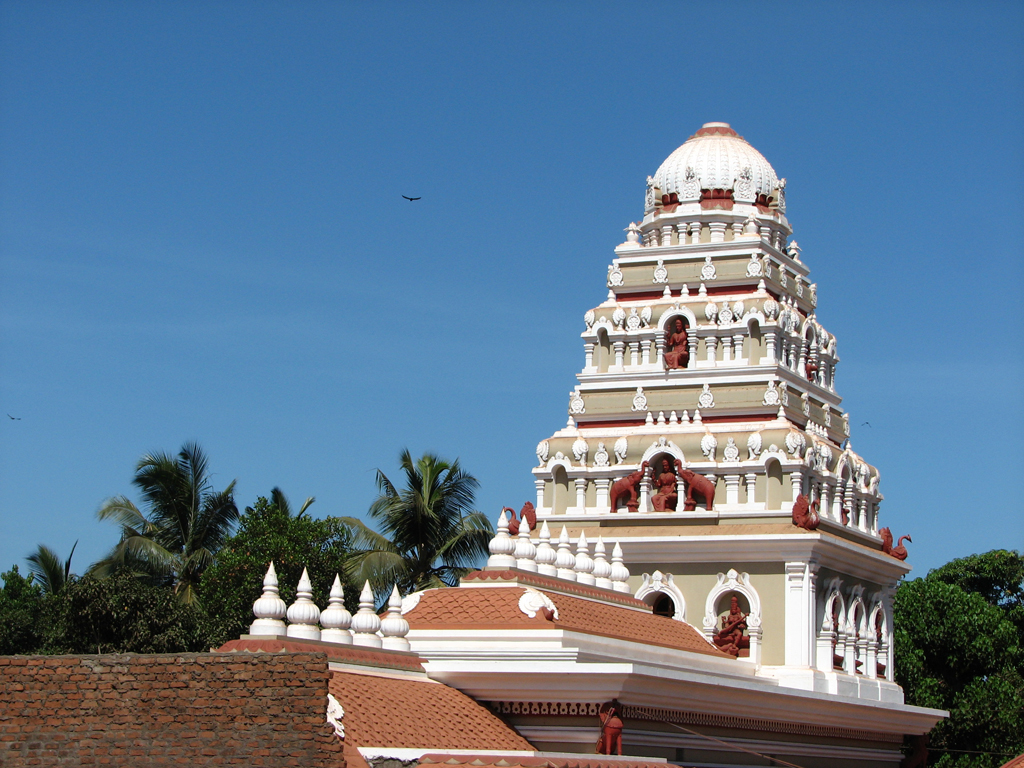

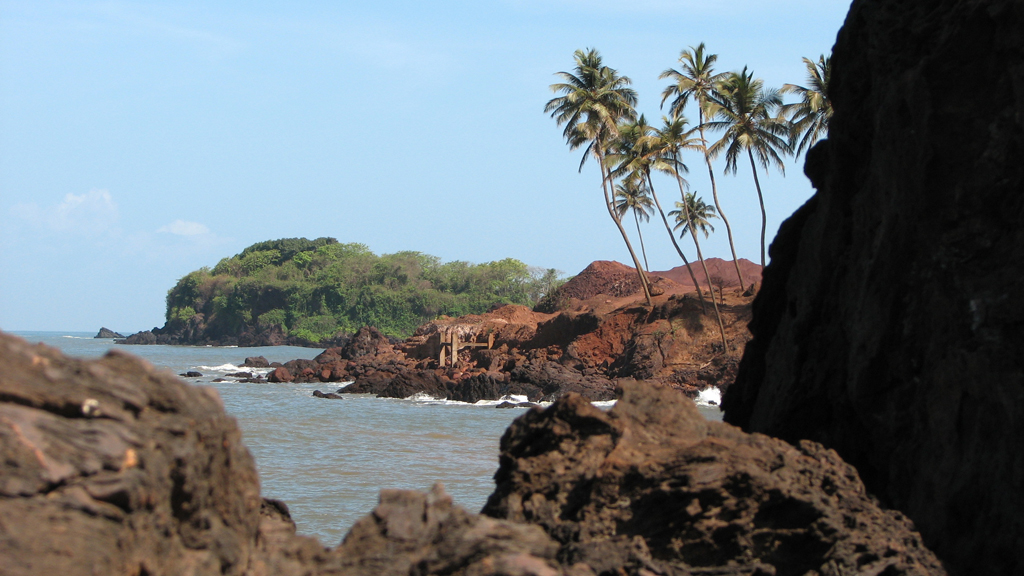

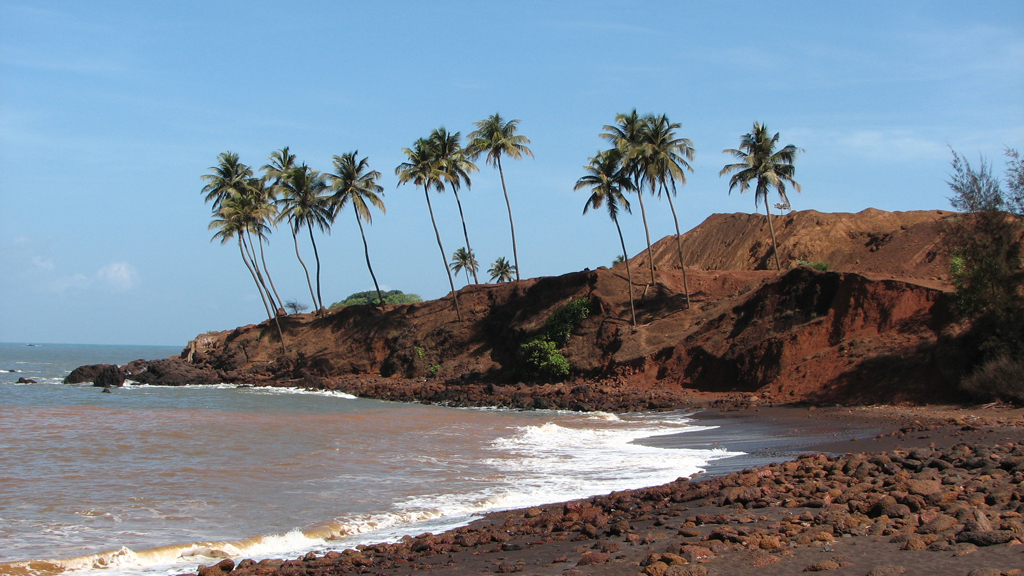

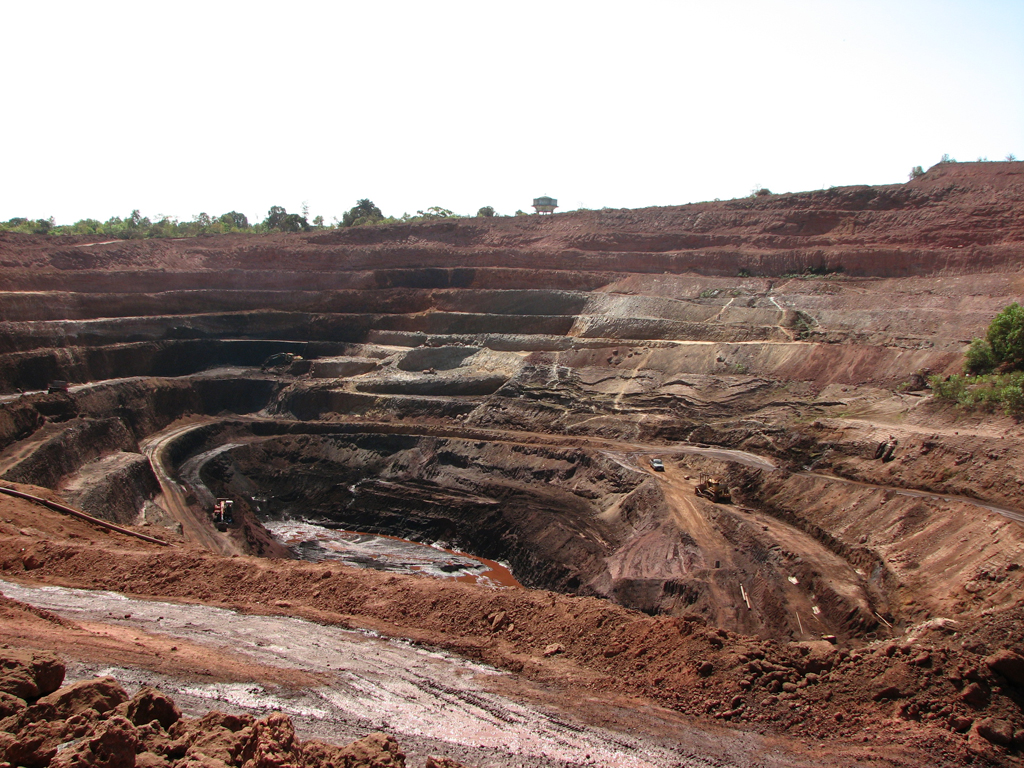

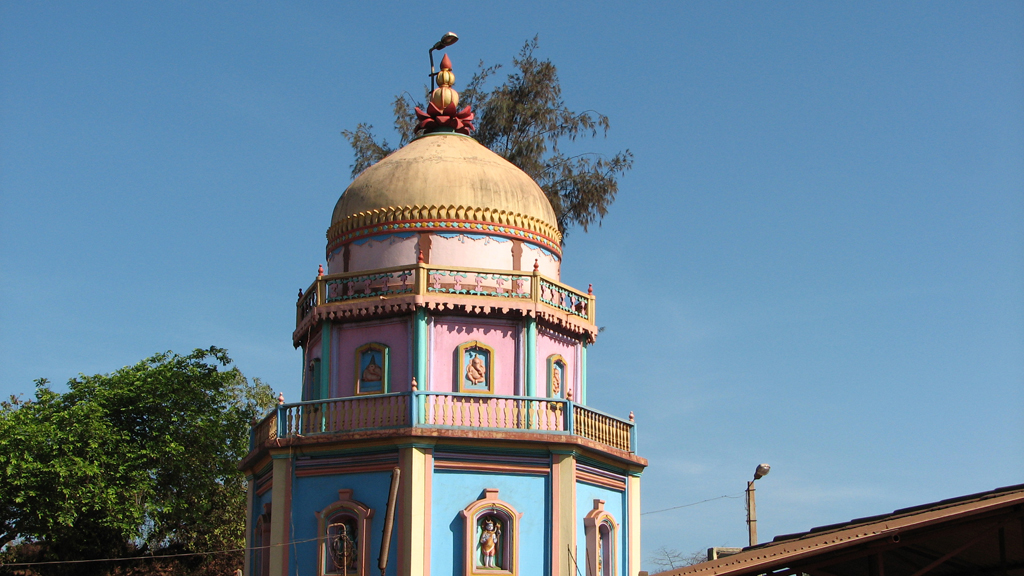

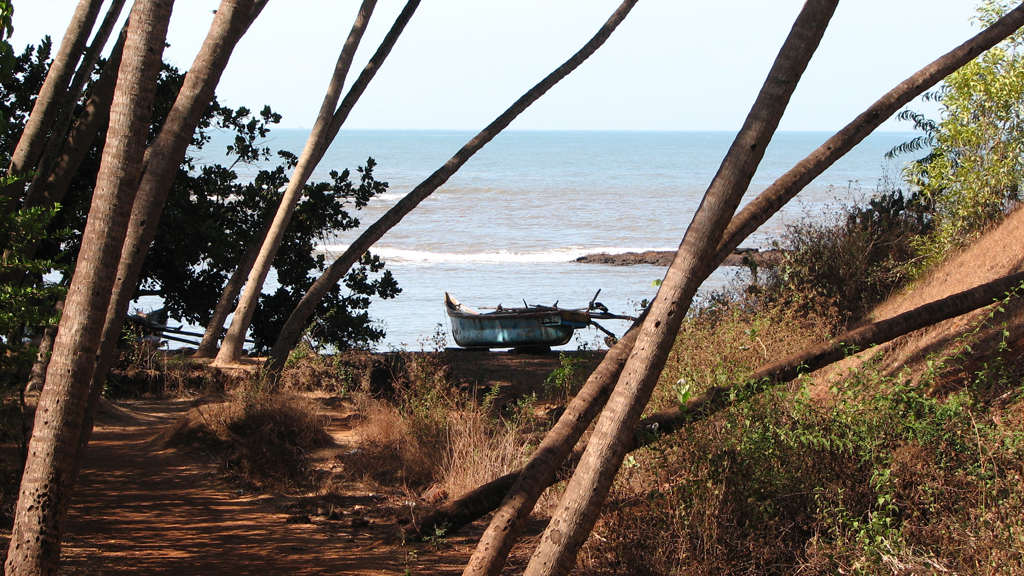

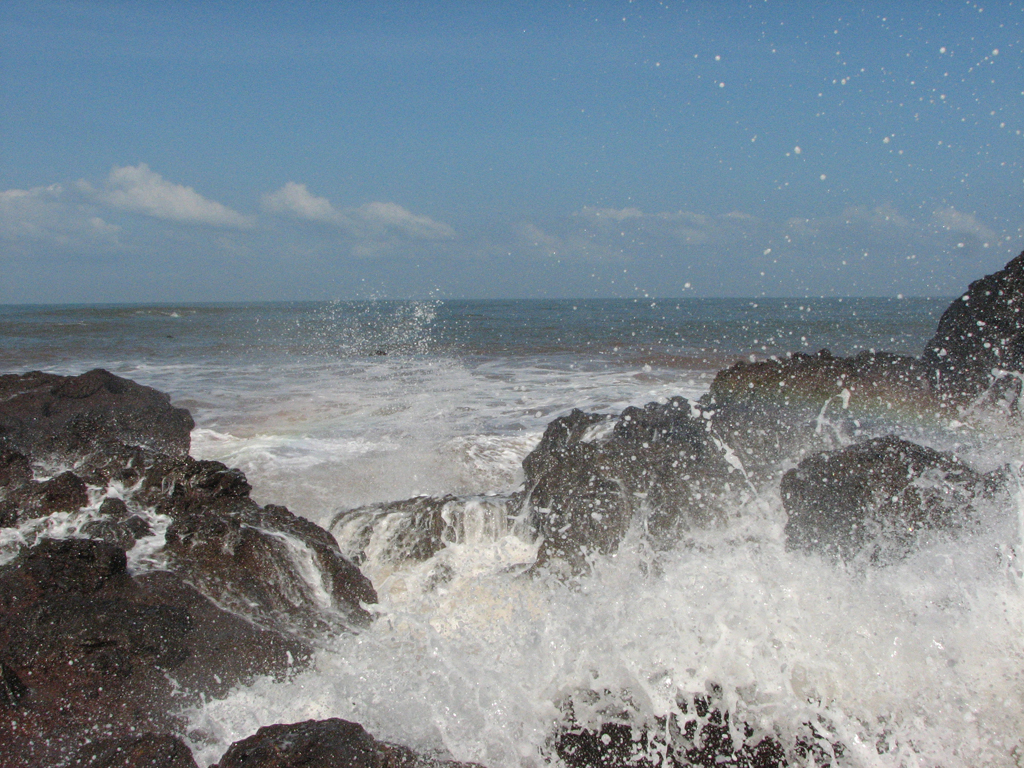

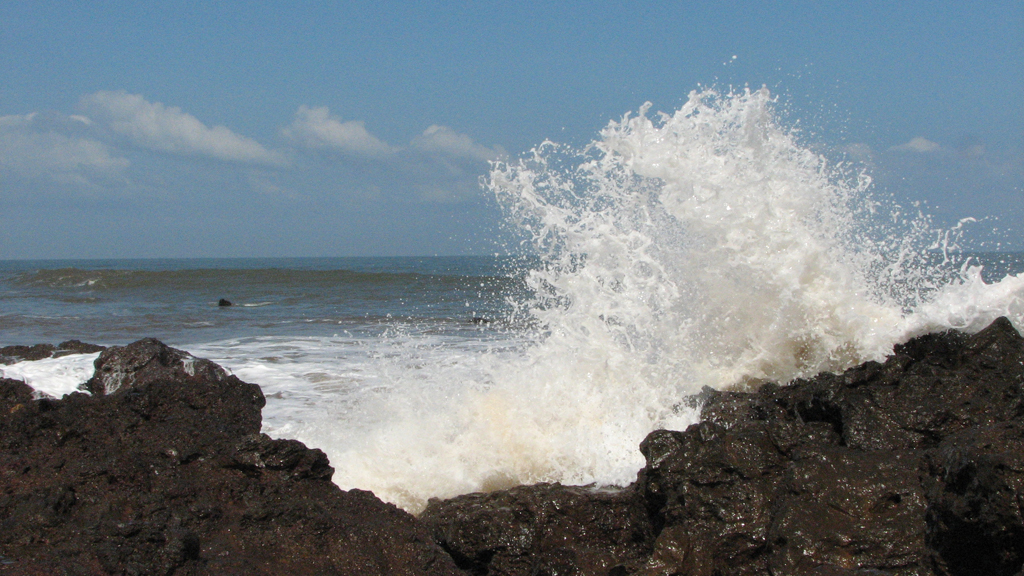

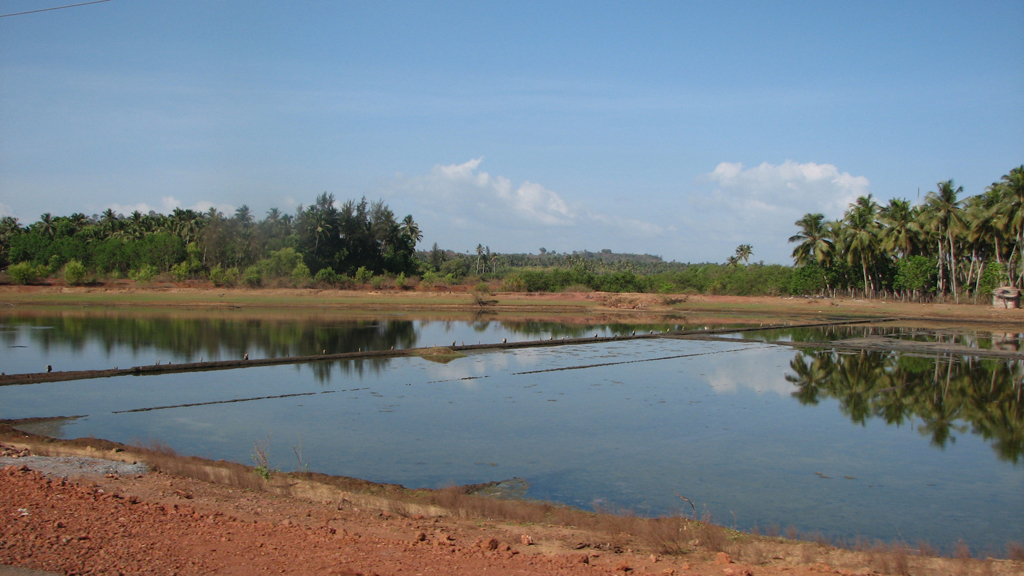

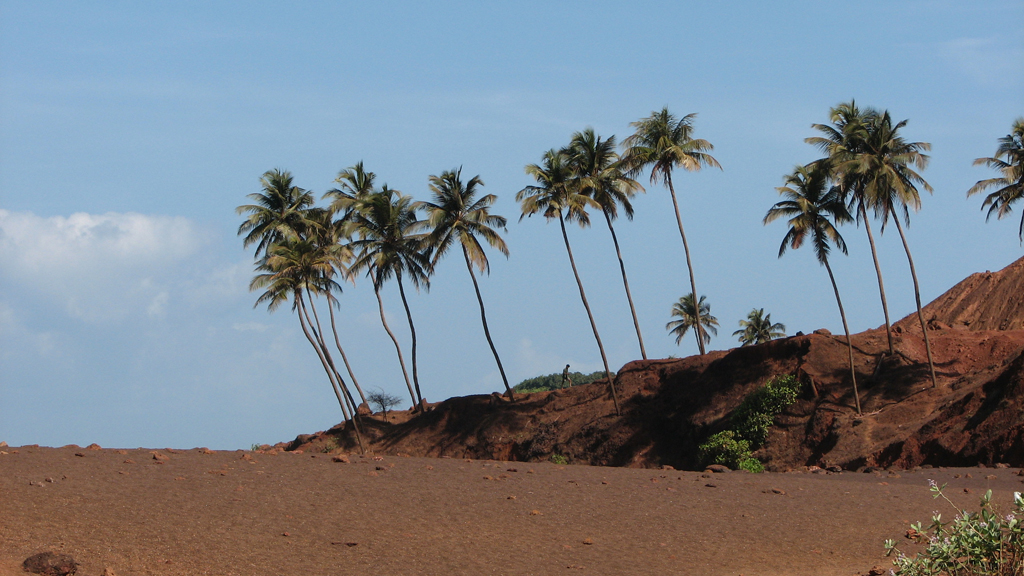

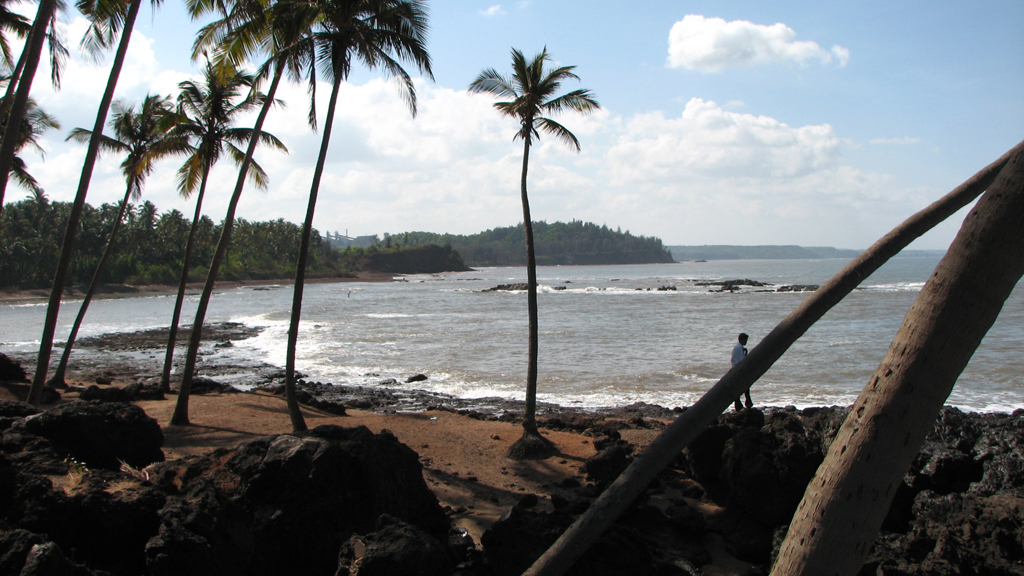
