= Redis (disambiguation) =

Redis (Remote Dictionary Server) is an open-source in-memory data structure project.

Redis may also refer to:

- Abou Redis, a city in South Sinai Governorate, Egypt
- Redis (company), an American computer software company
- Denys Prokopenko, Ukrainian military commander

== See also ==
- Redi (disambiguation)
