= Sawant =

Sawant is the surname of a Maratha clan, found mainly in the state of Maharashtra and neighbouring states in India.

== Notable people ==
People with this surname include:

- Abhijeet Sawant, singer
- Arvind Sawant, Ministry of Heavy Industries and Public Enterprises
- Ashlesha Sawant, Indian television actress
- Deepak Sawant, politician
- Govind Sawant, field hockey player
- Kamlesh Sawant, actor
- Kshama Sawant, U.S. economics professor and politician
- Kunal Sawant, football goalkeeper
- Nirmiti Sawant, actress
- P. B. Sawant, Indian Supreme Court judge
- Pandharinath Sawant, journalist
- P. K. Sawant, politician
- Pooja Sawant, actress
- Prajakta Sawant, badminton player
- Pramod Sawant, Chief Minister of Goa
- Pradip Sawant, Police Officer
- Rakhi Sawant, film actress, talk show host
- Shivaji Sawant, writer
- Sudhir Sawant, politician, lawyer and brigadier in Indian Army
- Sandeep Sawant, Indian film director
- Tejaswini Sawant, shooter
- Trupti Sawant, politician
- Vishram Sawant, author

== See also ==
- Bhonsle
- List of Maratha dynasties and states
- Maratha (caste)
- Maratha clan system
- Maratha Empire
- Sawantwadi
