= Pandharinath Sawant =

Pandharinath Sawant is a journalist from the state of Maharashtra in India who worked closely with Prabodhankar Thackeray and Bal Thackeray.

== Work ==
He covered the 1972 famine in Maharashtra. He also covered the Nav Nirman movement led by Jayaprakash Narayan in Bihar. His Autobiography is titled 'Mee Pandhari Girangavcha'. Based on the life of Textile millworkers residing prominently in Lalbaug and Parel-

== Early life ==
Following the explosions on April 14, 1944 in Mumbai, his family moved to Mahad and then to Vinhere in Konkan when a plague struck Mahad. He spent his childhood in the Bhoiwada Police Headquarters. His father was a commander in the Naigaon Armed Police Headquarters.

== Career ==
He taught in a village school, then worked as a helper in Mumbai at a factory, as a painter of Ganapati Idols, as a bus conductor with the Brihanmumbai Electric Supply and Transport, as a drawing teacher in a Municipal Urdu school and then a journalist. His career as a journalist began when the Daily 'Marmik' published his essay on the Israel-Arab war of 1967, he holds the post of an editor at 'Marmik' to this day. He joined 'Shree', another Marathi daily in 1971, he also worked in the 'Prabhanjan', Cine Blitz, Lokmat and Pudhari for a while. He wrote a book in Marathi on Adolf Hitler.
