= Ganapati Temple, Redi =

Hindu Temple

Coordinates: 15.7430614°N 73.6574438°E

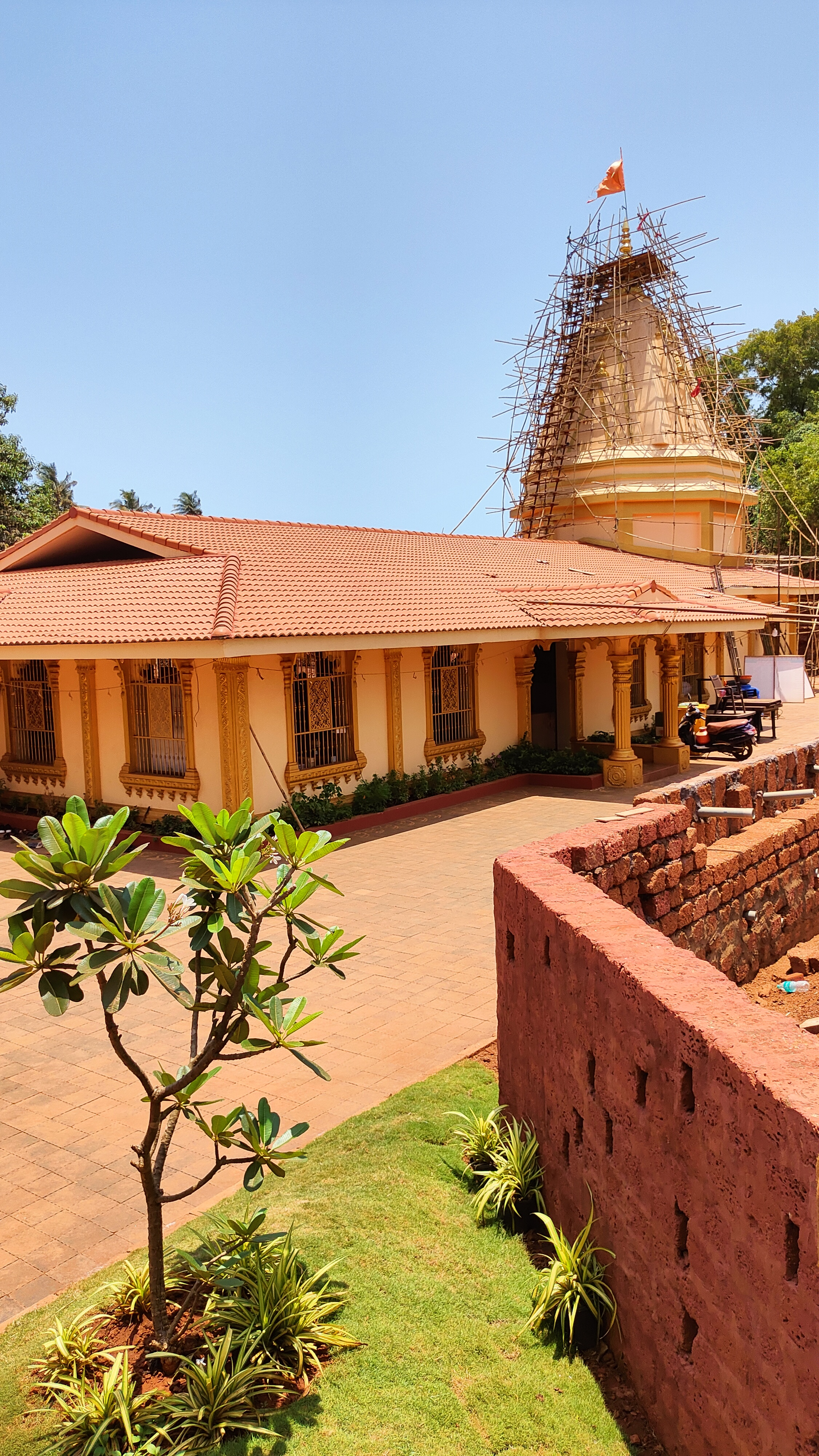

Religion
- Affiliation: Hinduism
- District: Vengurla
- Deity: Ganesha

Location
- Location: Redi
- State: Maharashtra
- Country: India
- Interactive map of Ganapati Temple, Redi

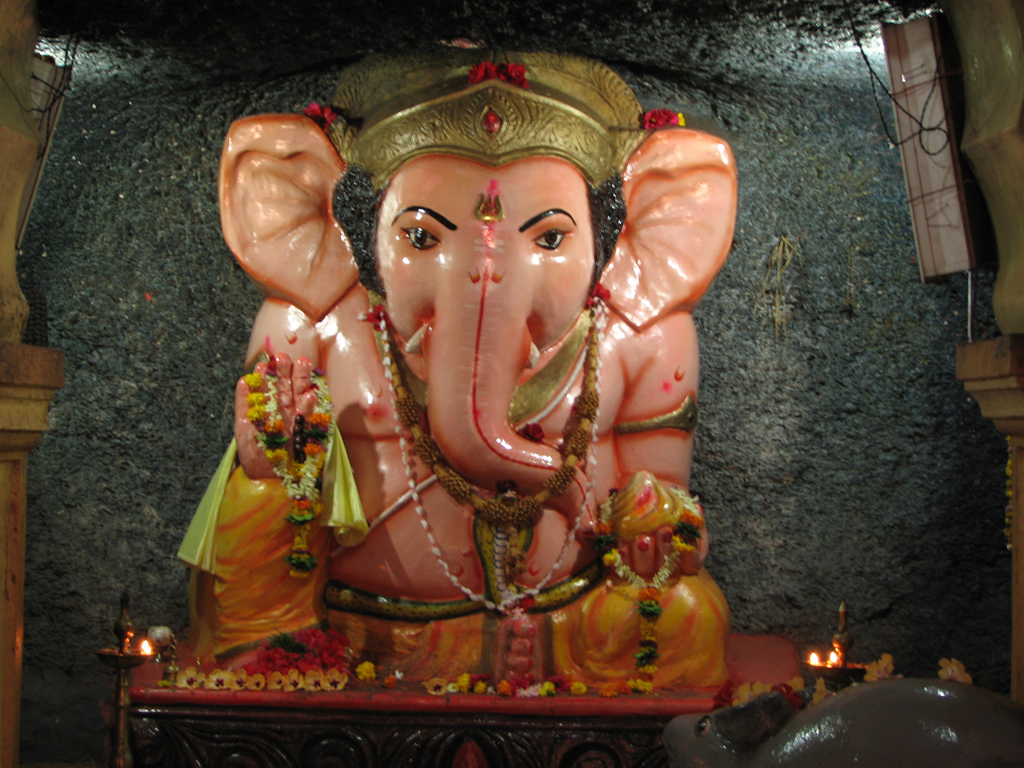
Ganapati idol

The Ganapati temple of Redi is located approximately 30 km from Vengurla, in the small village of Redi, Maharashtra, India. The town in which this temple is situated contains iron ore mines and the Ganpati (Ganesha) idol was found in one of the mines near Rewati port in 1976. A local person by the name of Sadashiv Kambli supposedly visualized a buried statue of Ganesha in his dream and convinced local workers to dig out the statue from the seashore. After an investigation it has been found that the statue was made by the Pandava during their rule. The statue is approximately 6 ft in height and 4 ft in width. The Ganesh idol is in a sitting position and is Dwibhuja (two arms) as compared to the rest of the idols which are generally Chaturbhuja (four arms). The mouse idol (vahana) was found on further excavation after two months.
