= Vengurla =

Vengurla Beach
- Beach
- Vengurla beach (Navabag beach)

- Location in Maharashtra, India
- Coordinates: 15.8500522°N 73.6322812°E
- Country: India
- State: Maharashtra
- District: Sindhudurg
- Elevation: 11 m (36 ft)

Population (2001)
  - Total: 12,471

Languages
  - Official: Marathi
- Time zone: UTC+5:30 (IST)
- Postal code: 416516

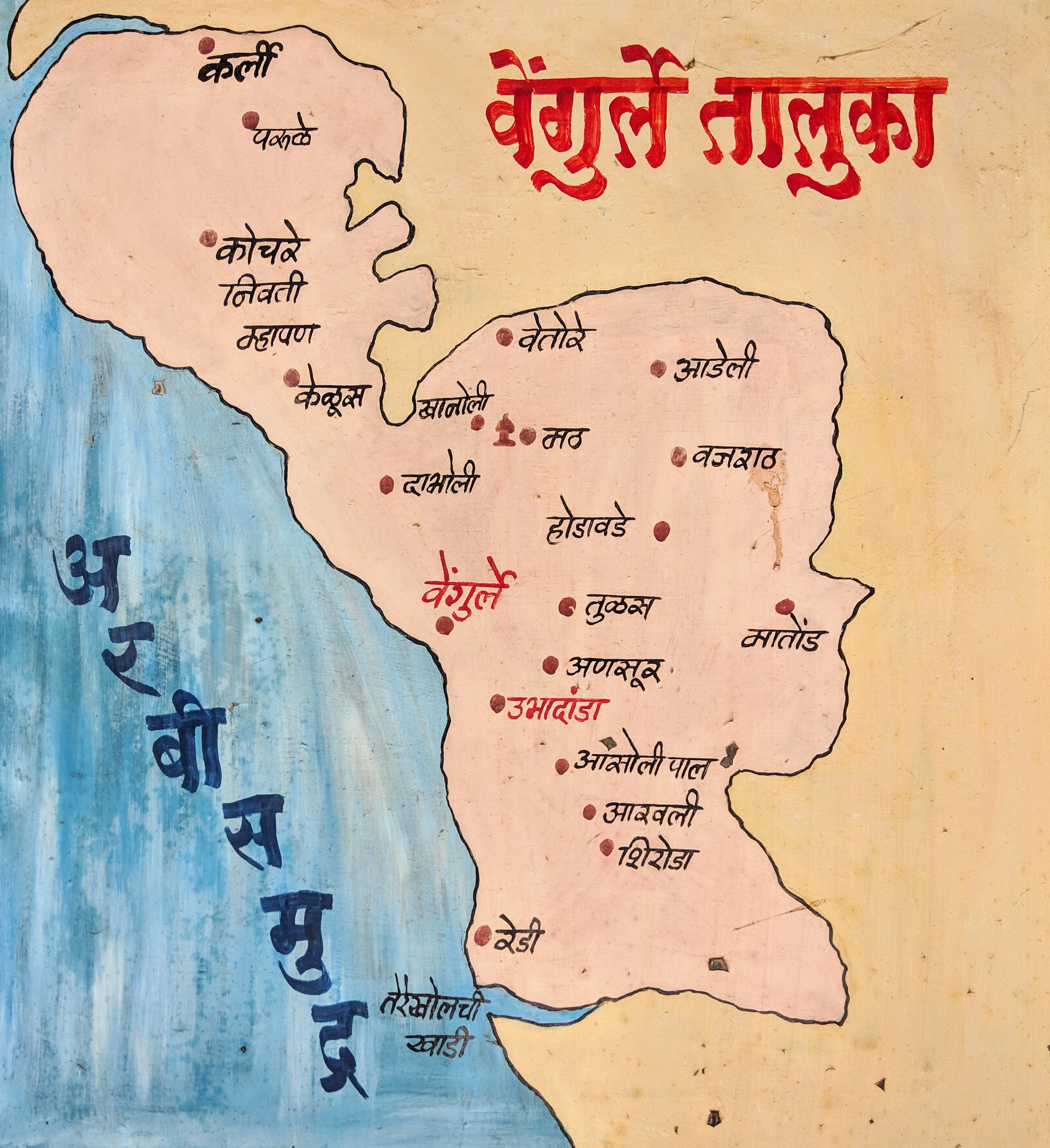
Vengurla Taluka

Vengurla is a town in Sindhudurg district of Maharashtra, India just north of Goa. It is surrounded by a semicircular range of hills with lush green foliage mainly of cashew, mango, coconut, and different kinds of berry trees. The hills of Dabholi, Tulas, and Mochemad respectively lie in the north, the east, and the south of Vengurla, while the Arabian Sea is located on its west.

The town has a rich cultural heritage. Vengurla Taluka has some temples including those of Devi Sateri, Shri Rameshwar, Shri Navadurga at Kanyale Redi, Shri Mauli at Redi and Shiroda, Shri Vetoba at Aaravali, Shri Rampurush Temple at Kanyale Redi, Shri Ganesh at Redi and Shri Ravalnath.

== History ==
Vengurla, being a safe and natural port, commercial centre was initially established during 1665 by Dutch traders and subsequently by British rulers. Signs of Dutch - British rulers are present in the city : Dutch Wakhar (Warehouse), St. Lukes Hospital, Crowferd Market, etc. Planned city having road, market, commercial and office buildings, Municipal Council, Hospitals, Parks, etc. was developed by British rulers. The 130-year-old Vengurla Municipal Council is one of the oldest Municipal Council in Maharashtra State.

== Geography ==
Vengurla is located at 15.87°N 73.63°E. It has an average elevation of 11 metres (36 ft). Vengurla is also known as Vingoria. It includes areas such as Dabholi, Khanoli, Vetore, Tendoli, Wayangani, Surangpani, Shiroda, Redi.

== Climate ==
Climate data for Vengurla (1991–2020, extremes 1948–2020)
Month	Jan	Feb	Mar	Apr	May	Jun	Jul	Aug	Sep	Oct	Nov	Dec	Year
Record high °C (°F)	37.4 (99.3)	38.9 (102.0)	38.8 (101.8)	40.0 (104.0)	38.2 (100.8)	37.3 (99.1)	34.8 (94.6)	33.5 (92.3)	35.1 (95.2)	37.4 (99.3)	37.3 (99.1)	37.5 (99.5)	40.0 (104.0)
Mean daily maximum °C (°F)	32.2 (90.0)	32.5 (90.5)	32.1 (89.8)	33.0 (91.4)	33.4 (92.1)	31.2 (88.2)	29.7 (85.5)	29.6 (85.3)	30.1 (86.2)	32.2 (90.0)	33.6 (92.5)	33.0 (91.4)	31.9 (89.4)
Mean daily minimum °C (°F)	16.6 (61.9)	17.3 (63.1)	20.5 (68.9)	23.6 (74.5)	25.3 (77.5)	24.9 (76.8)	24.4 (75.9)	24.2 (75.6)	23.6 (74.5)	23.1 (73.6)	20.3 (68.5)	16.9 (62.4)	21.7 (71.1)
Record low °C (°F)	11.3 (52.3)	11.6 (52.9)	13.6 (56.5)	17.0 (62.6)	21.4 (70.5)	20.0 (68.0)	18.6 (65.5)	21.6 (70.9)	20.1 (68.2)	16.5 (61.7)	11.9 (53.4)	10.6 (51.1)	10.6 (51.1)
Average rainfall mm (inches)	0.3 (0.01)	0.2 (0.01)	0.4 (0.02)	2.3 (0.09)	48.0 (1.89)	868.5 (34.19)	1,037 (40.83)	571.8 (22.51)	320.8 (12.63)	168.1 (6.62)	16.8 (0.66)	5.1 (0.20)	3,039.2 (119.65)
Average rainy days	0.1	0.1	0.0	0.3	2.5	20.6	27.0	23.7	14.5	6.6	1.1	0.3	96.8
Average relative humidity (%) (at 17:30 IST)	54	55	61	64	66	79	83	82	79	74	62	55	68
Source: India Meteorological Department

Under the Köppen climate classification, Vengurla features a tropical monsoon climate The record high temperature was 42 °C which was recorded in the month of April while the record low temperature was 10 °C which was recorded in the month of December. The annual precipitation is 3,155.3 mm (124.22 in).

== Demographics ==
According to India's 2001 census, Vengurla had a population of 12,471 in 2001. Males and females constituted 49% and 51%, respectively, of the population. 81% of Vengurla's population was literate (86% of males and 76% of females) compared to 59.5% of India's total population. 10% of the town's population was under 6 years of age at the time of the census.

== Governance ==
=== Waste management ===
The municipal waste dumping ground in Vengurla has become a tourist attraction, and by 2017 had received 7000 visitors. Vegurla separates waste into 23 categories, and the park recycles almost every type of waste, including plastic, cloth and paper. The municipality earns a hefty income, which is used back in municipal activities. Wet waste is used to generate biogas, producing 30 units of electricity per tonne, which powers all the different types of machines used here.

Waste plastic is also used to build roads, and as of 2017 and in 2 years time, Vengurla has 12 km of “plastic” roads and earns INR 15 per kg of plastic sold to contractors for road-building in nearby areas.

== Language ==
Malvani is spoken as a local language (Malvani Konkani). Marathi, being the state language, is also understood and widely used.

== Places of interest ==
- Dev Vethobha Temple, Aarvali
- Shirodha Beach for Water Sports
- Mochemad Beach
- Dutch Fortified Factory (1637)
- Velaghar
- Kepadevi Temple, Ubhadanda
- Asoli
- Lighthouse
- Terekhol Beach
- Mansishwar Temple, Bagayatwadi
- Kalvi beach, kelus
- Redi
- Vengurla jetty
- Sagareshwar Beach
- Dabholi beach
- Ubhadanda beach
- Wayangani beach
- Bagayatwadi beach
- Muth beach
- Mansishvar Temple
- Dabhoswada, Vengurla Bandar Road
- Navghar Beach
- Vetore Sateri temple, ravalnath

  temple

- Sri Dev Jaitir Mandir, Tulas

== Image gallery ==
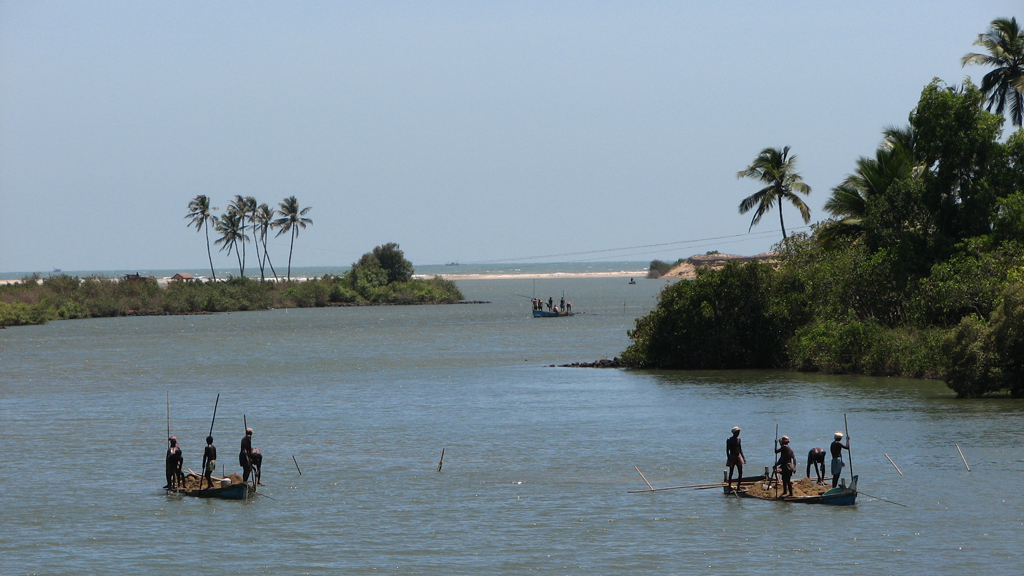
Mochemad

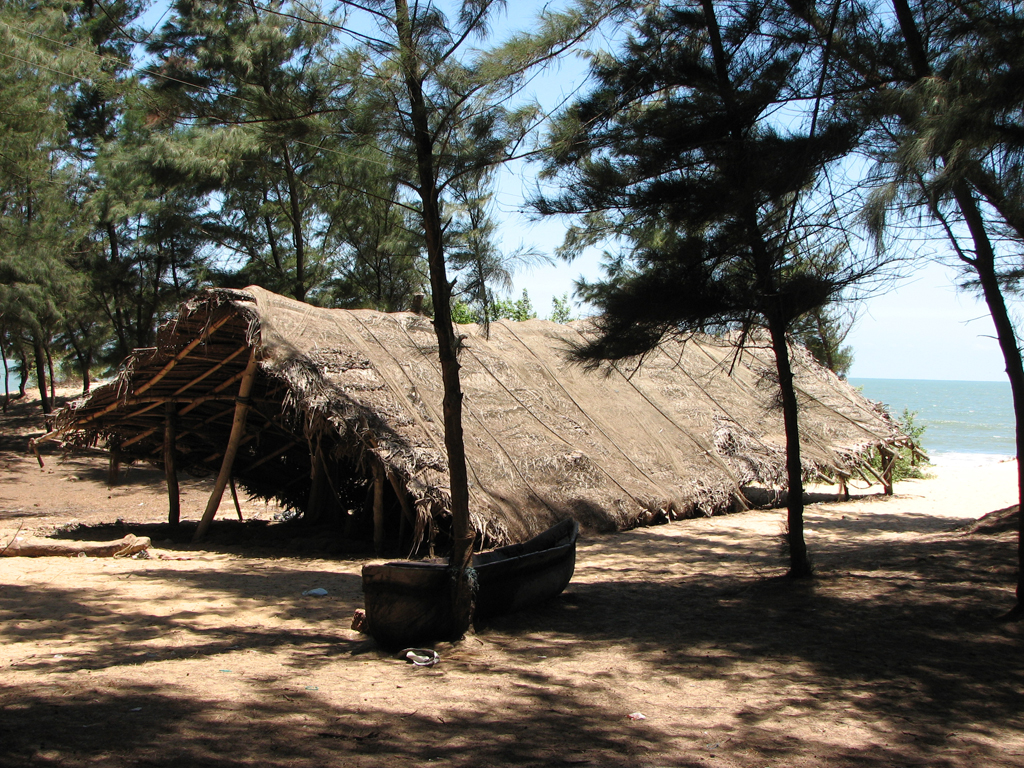
Velaghar

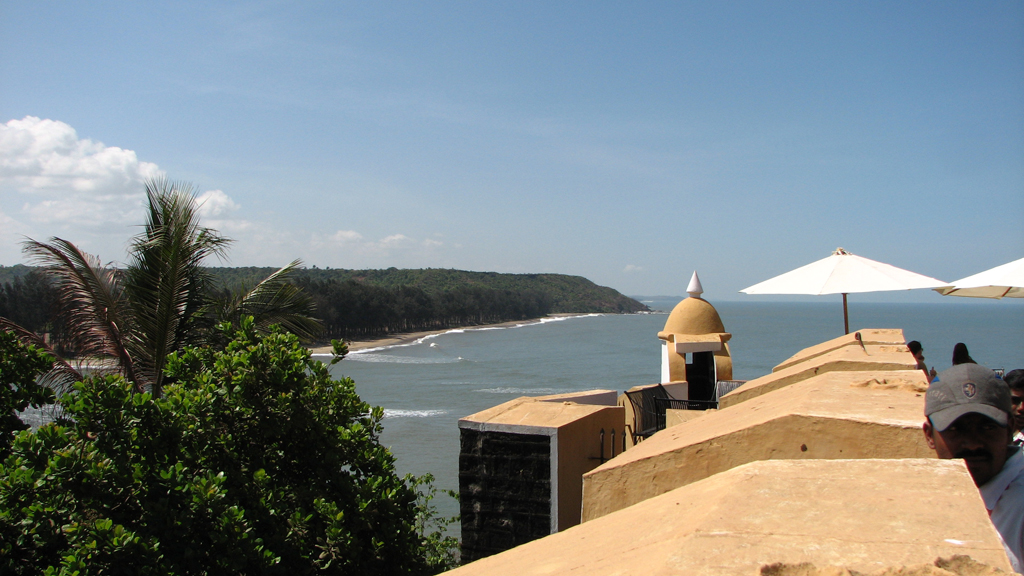
Terekhol

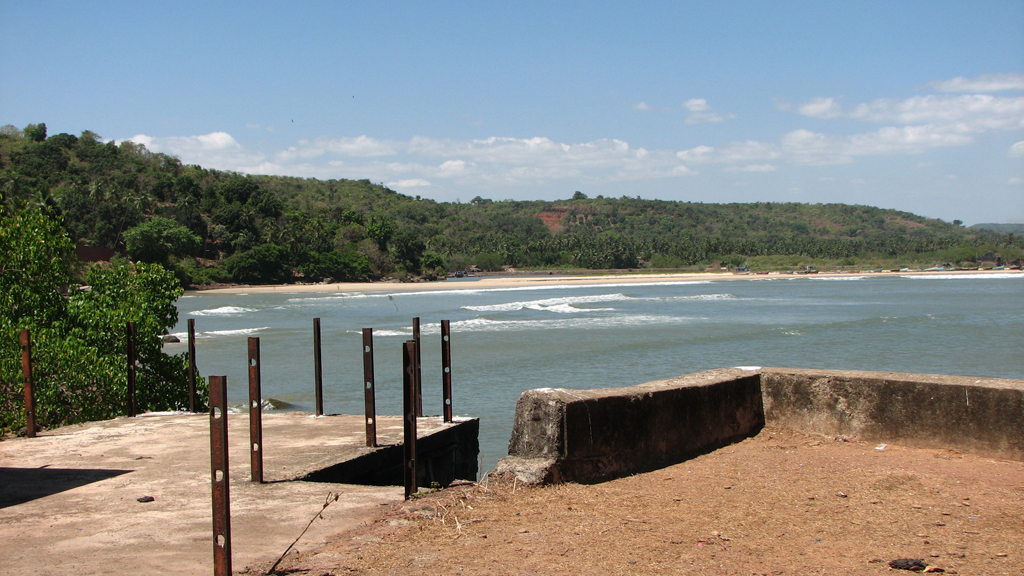
Vengurla
