= Tringalwadi Jain Cave =

Medieval Jain rock-cut temple in Maharashtra, India

Coordinates: 19.7350°N 73.5407°E

Tringalwadi Jain cave
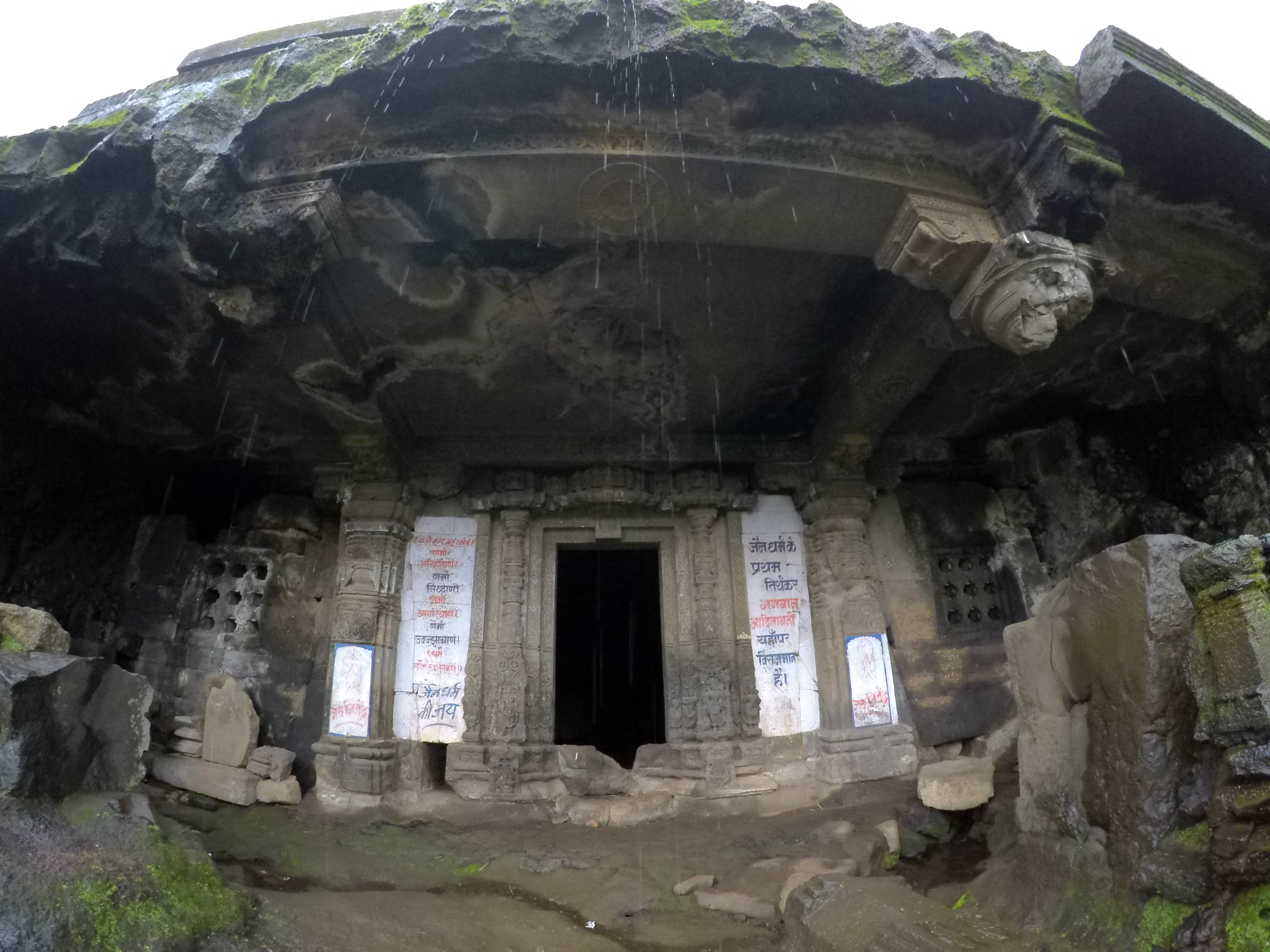
- Tringalwadi Jain cave

Religion
- Affiliation: Jainism
- Deity: Rishabhanatha

Location
- Location: Tringalwadi, Nashik

Architecture
- Type: Rock-cut monuments
- Established: 12th century
- Monument: 1

Tringalwadi Jain cave is a Jain rock-cut temple at the foot of Tringalwadi Fort near Igatpuri in Nashik district, Maharashtra, India. The cave is one of the later Jain rock-cut monuments of the Deccan and is associated with the medieval Jain tradition of the Nashik region. It is a Digambara Jain monument and is protected by the Archaeological Survey of India.

== Location ==
The cave is situated at the base of the hill on which Tringalwadi Fort stands, approximately 10 kilometres from Igatpuri. The hill lies near the historic route through the Thal Ghat, which connected the Deccan Plateau with the Konkan. The location formed part of the wider network of Jain religious establishments in the Nashik region, which includes Ankai-Tankai Jain caves, Anjaneri, Mangi-Tungi and other medieval Jain sites.

== History ==
The cave was excavated during the medieval period. Viraj Shah places Tringalwadi among the later Jain caves of Maharashtra and considers its architecture and decorative programme broadly contemporary with the 12th-century Jain caves at Ankai-Tankai. The cave's architectural features closely imitate contemporary structural temple architecture. Its verandah, plinth, pillars, doorway and shrine were designed to reproduce architectural elements normally associated with freestanding temples. Shah identifies this tendency as characteristic of the later phase of Jain rock-cut architecture in Maharashtra. The site continued to be associated with Jain religious activity after the initial excavation. An inscription associated with the image of Rishabhanatha in the shrine is dated to Śaka 1266, corresponding to 1344 CE, providing evidence for the continued use of the cave in the 14th century.

== Architecture ==
The cave consists of a decorated verandah leading into a large hall, with an antechamber and a shrine at the rear. The hall originally had four pillars, although most of the original pillars are now damaged or lost. Low platforms or benches run along parts of the interior walls. The entrance façade contains a carved doorway framed by pillars and pilasters. The verandah has a low parapet and decorative elements, while the ceiling contains carved figures. The architectural treatment of the entrance and interior demonstrates the deliberate imitation of structural Jain temples in a rock-cut medium. The hall measures approximately 35 feet square. At the rear is an antechamber leading to a shrine measuring approximately 13 by 12 feet.

== Sculpture ==
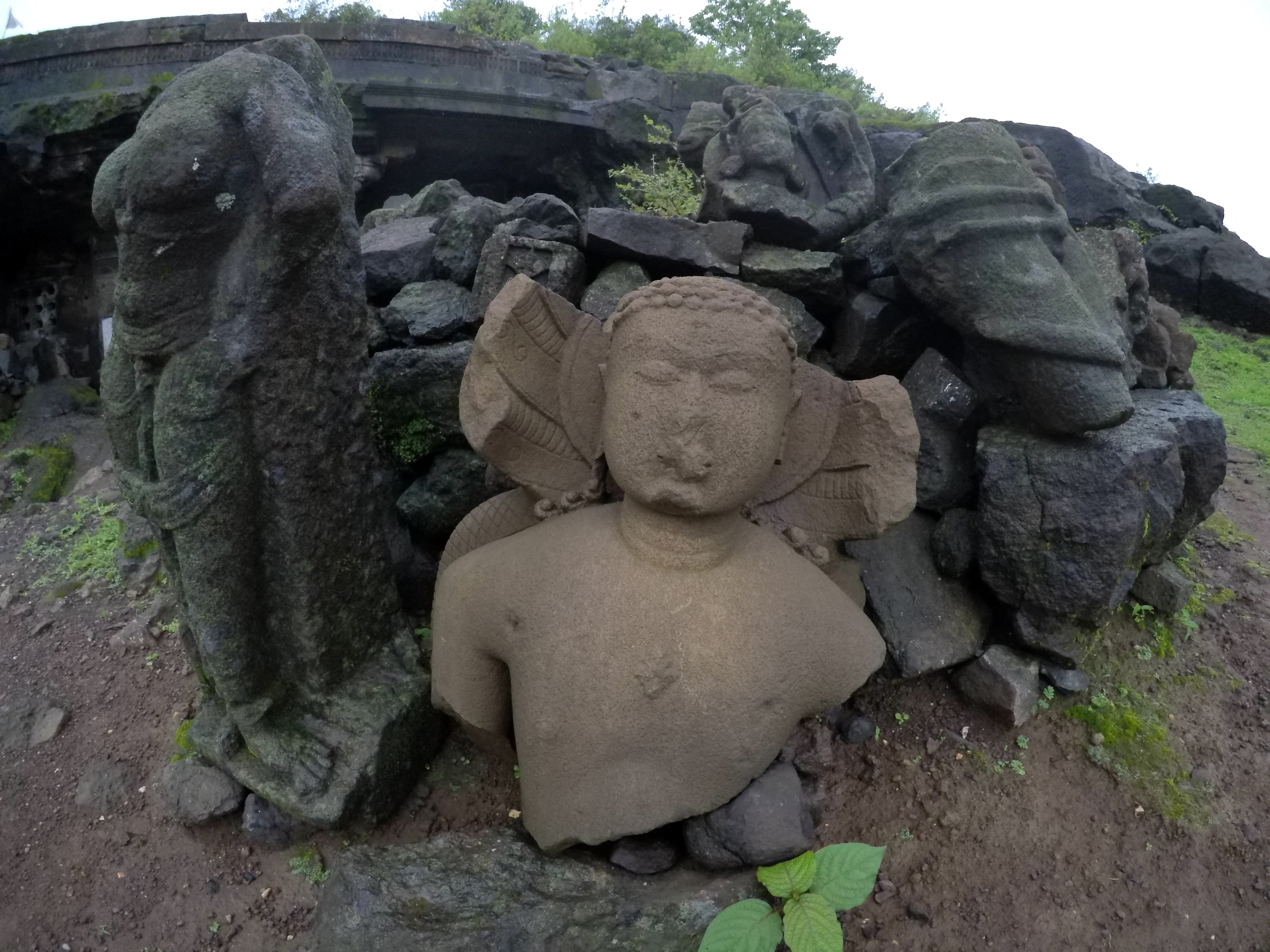
Broken Jain idol

The principal surviving image in the shrine represents Rishabhanatha, the first Tirthankara. The image is seated in padmasana and was originally substantially larger and more complete than its present remains. The head, chest and umbrella of the image were damaged or removed, while the lower portion and pedestal survive. The bull emblem on the pedestal identifies the image as Rishabhanatha. Three Jina figures are carved above the shrine doorway. The entrance and pillars also contain decorative and Jain-related sculptural elements, including representations of the yaksha Dharanendra and yakshi Padmavati.

== Inscription ==
A two-line inscription is carved on the pedestal or cushion associated with the Rishabhanatha image. It records the date Śaka 1266, corresponding to 1344 CE. The inscription is written in Devanagari and provides an important chronological indication for the continued Jain use of the monument. The inscription does not necessarily date the original excavation of the cave. The architectural and iconographic evidence has led Shah to assign the cave itself to the 12th century, while the 1344 inscription represents a later phase of use or dedication.

== Date ==
The original excavation of the Tringalwadi Jain cave is generally assigned to the 12th century. Shah compares its architecture with the contemporary Jain caves at Ankai-Tankai and identifies the use of structural-temple forms in the rock-cut architecture as characteristic of the period. The surviving inscription dated Śaka 1266 (1344 CE) demonstrates that the monument remained in use after its original excavation. It should therefore not be used as the construction date of the cave itself.

== Significance ==
The Tringalwadi cave is significant for the study of late Jain rock-cut architecture in western India. Its architectural forms closely reproduce those of contemporary structural temples, including the plinth, decorated doorway, pillars and shrine arrangement. Shah regards this imitation of structural architecture as an important feature of the later Jain caves of Maharashtra. The cave is also significant for the history of Jainism in the Nashik region because it forms part of a concentration of medieval Jain sites along important routes through the Western Ghats and the Deccan.

== Conservation ==
The Tringalwadi Jain cave is a centrally protected monument under the Archaeological Survey of India. The ASI's list of centrally protected monuments identifies it as the “Jaina Cave” at Tringalwadi in Nashik district.

== See also ==
- Tringalwadi
- Ankai Jain cave
- Anjaneri
- Mangi-Tungi
