= Chandwad fort =

Fort in Maharashtra, India

Chandwad Fort
- चांदवड किल्ला
- Part of Ajintha Satmal Hill Range
- Nashik district, Maharashtra
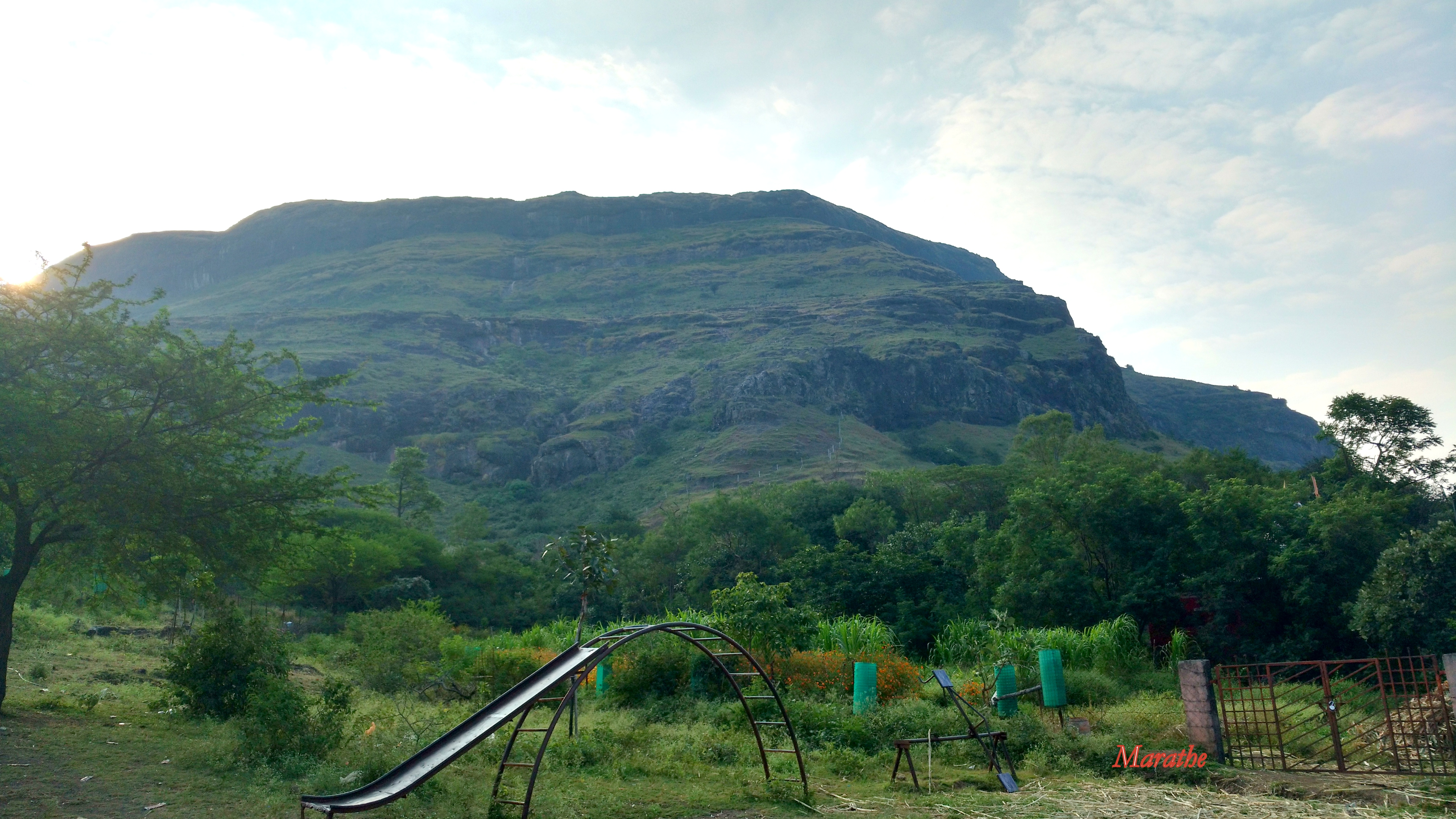
- Chandwad fort from Mahadev temple

Site information
- Type: Hill fort
- Owner: Government of India
- Controlled by: Yadava Dynasty; Bahmani Sultanate (1400–1635); Mughal Empire(1635-1665); Maratha Empire (1665–1818); United Kingdom: East India Company (1818–1857); British Raj (1859–1947); India (1947–)
- Open to the public: Yes
- Condition: Ruins

Location
- Shown within Maharashtra Chandwad Fort (India)
- Coordinates: 20°20′12.6″N 74°15′33″E
- Height: 1368.55 m (4490 ft)

Site history
- Materials: Stone

Chandwad Fort (Chandor fort; चांदवड किल्ला) is located 3 kilometres (1.9 mi) from Chandwad, Nashik district, of Maharashtra.

== History ==
Chandwad fort was positioned to overlook the trade route from Khandesh to Nashik. It guarded the Chandor pass in the nearby hills. It was built about A.D. 801 by Dridhaprahara, the founder of the Seuna (Yadava) dynasty.

King Bhoj established 52 temples in the nearby region. His daughter, Chandrakala, was married to King Vikram at this fort. The fort was under the control of the Bahmani Sultanate in 14th century. In 1635 the Moghul army took Chandor fort along with Indrai fort. In 1665 Chanwad fort was taken by the Maratha Empire. It was later captured by the Moghul emperor, Aurangzeb. Between 1754 and 1756, Malharrao Holkar induced craftsman to settle in the town by gifting some land. Chandwad then became famous for its brass-work.

On 10 April 1818, after the surrender of Ankai and Tankai forts, the British forces captured Chanwad fort under the detachment headed by Lieutenant Colonel McDowell. In 1857, during the first war of independence (the rebellion), the 24th Maratha regiment initially took charge of the fort, but had to surrender it to British forces in 1859.

After the opening of the G.I.P. Railway depot at Manmad in 1861, the bulk of trade line traffic was diverted away from Chandwad.

== Gallery ==
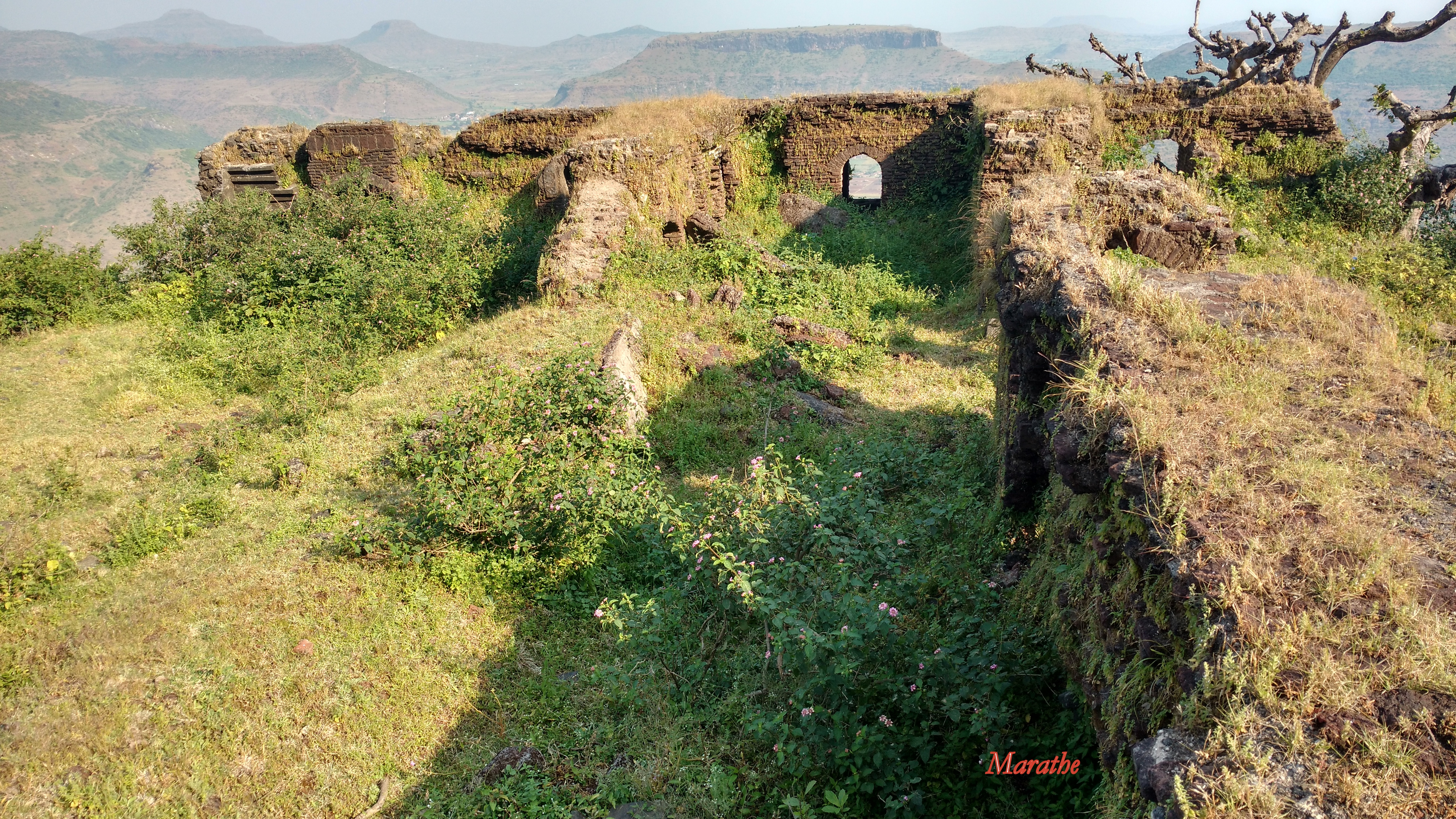
Ruins of the Mint building

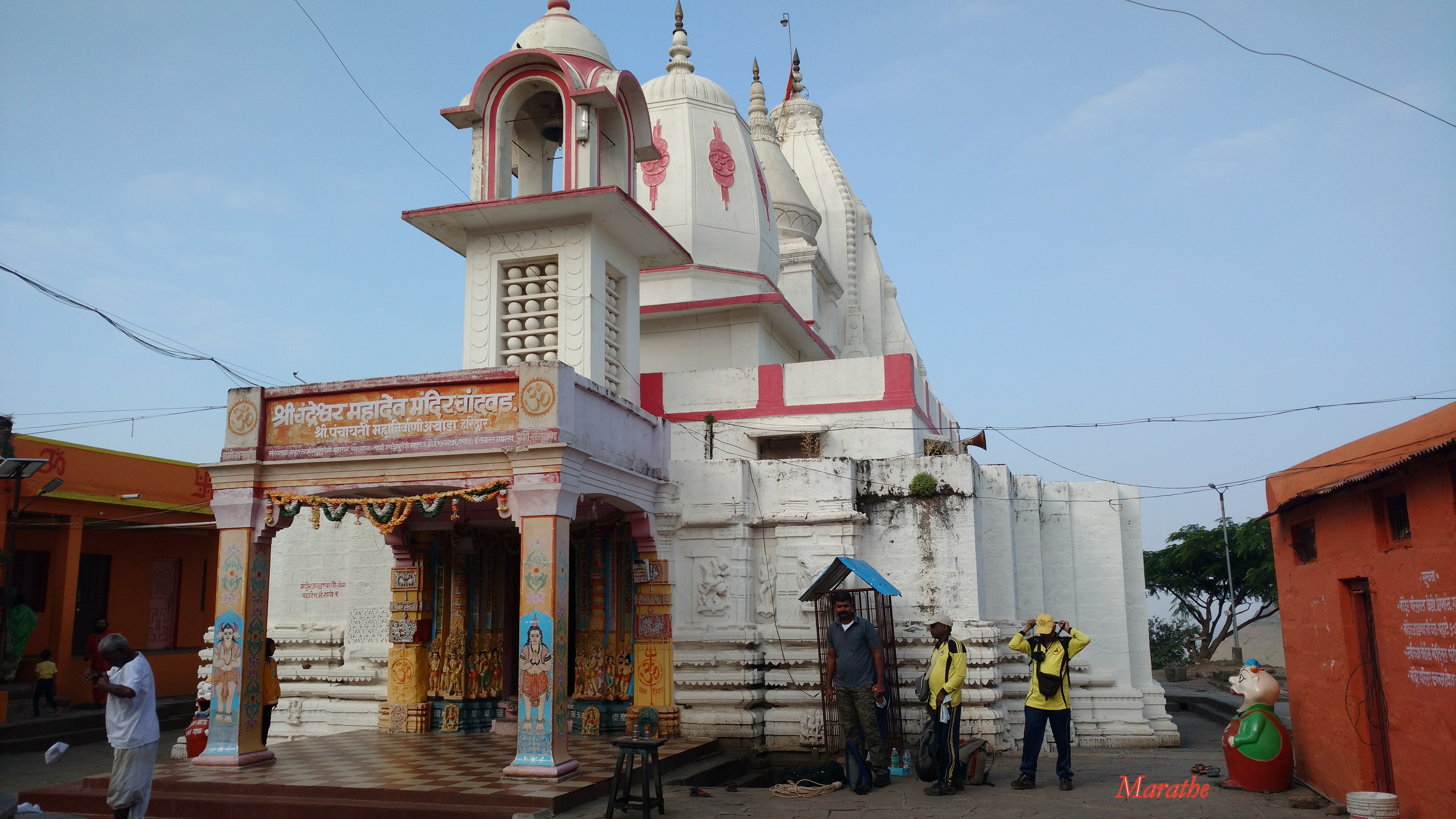
Chandreshwar Mahadev temple

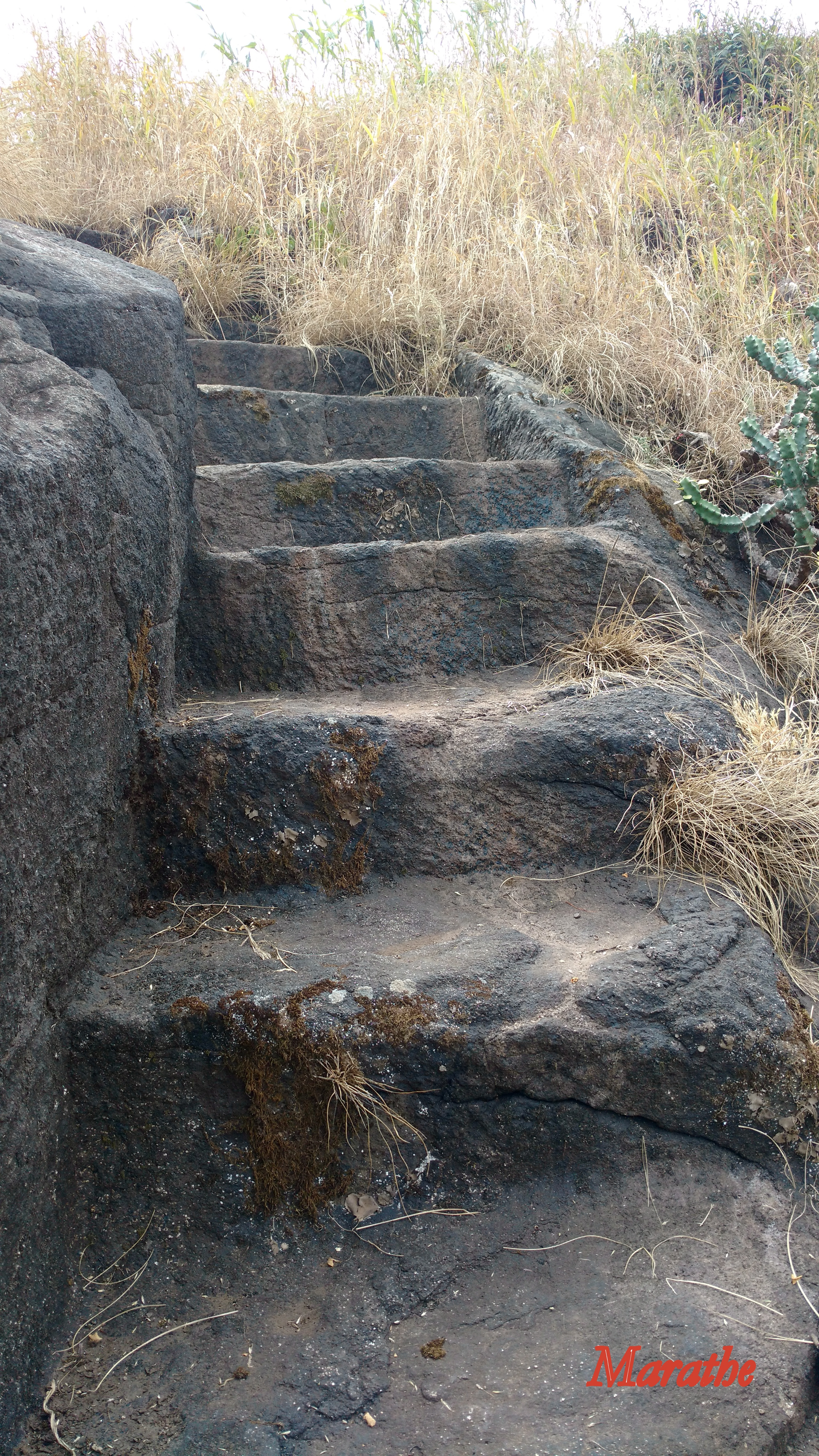
Rock cut steps

== See also ==
- List of forts in Maharashtra
- List of forts in India
- Marathi People
- List of Maratha dynasties and states
- Maratha War of Independence
- Military history of India
- Bahamani Sultanate
