= Ankai Jain cave =

Ancient rock-cut cave

Coordinates: 20.18753°N 74.4536°E

Ankai Jain caves
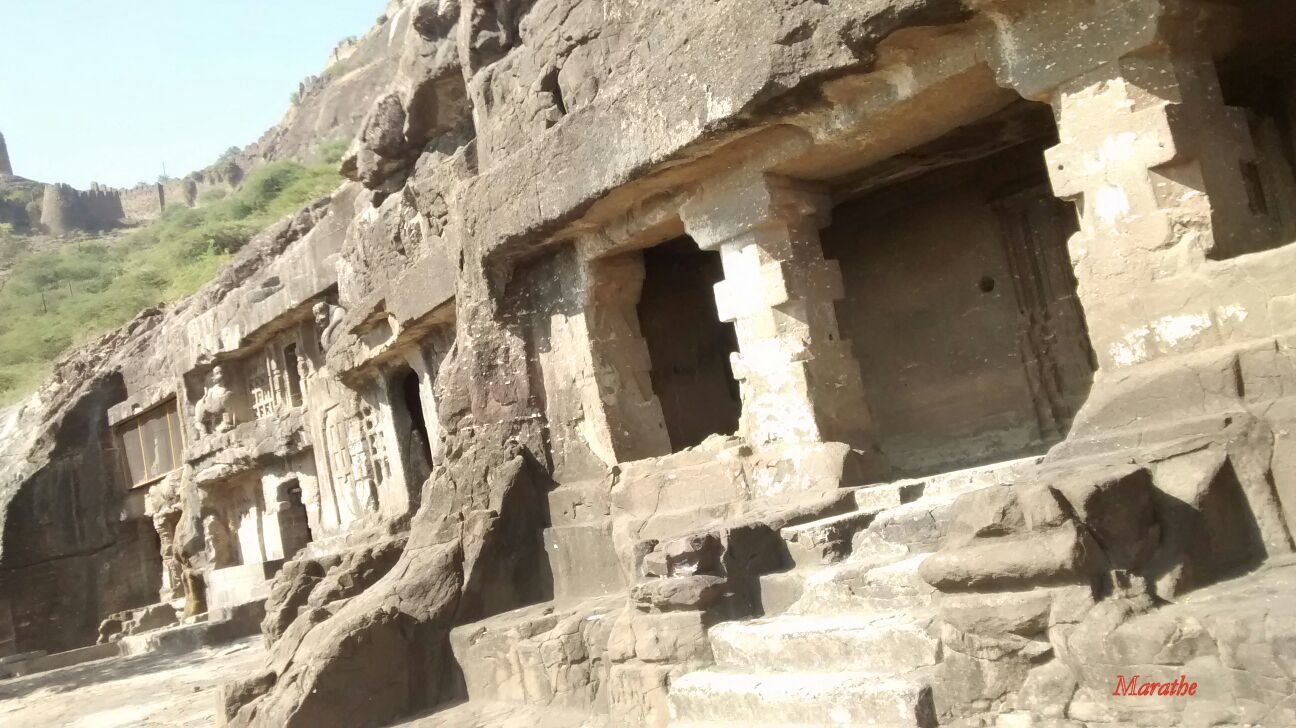
- Ankai Jain caves

Religion
- Affiliation: Jainism

Location
- Location: Ankai, Nashik

Architecture
- Type: Rock-cut monuments
- Established: 11th century
- Monument: 10

Ankai Jain caves are a group of Jain rock-cut caves on the hills of Ankai-Tankai, near Manmad in Nashik district, Maharashtra, India. The caves were excavated on the southern face of the ridge connecting the hills of Ankai and Tankai and form one of the principal groups of medieval Jain rock-cut monuments in Maharashtra.

== Location ==
The twin hills of Ankai and Tankai are located near Manmad in Nashik district. Ankai is a prominent fortified hill, while the Jain caves are situated on the ascent to the connecting ridge between the two hills. Viraj Shah records ten Jain caves at the site. The caves occupy a strategically located hill area associated with routes connecting northern and southern parts of the Deccan. The combination of a hill fort, water resources and religious establishments contributed to the importance of the location.

== History ==
The Jain caves at Ankai-Tankai belong to the medieval period. Archaeological and stylistic studies place the principal caves broadly between the 11th and 13th centuries CE, with individual caves and sculptures showing differences in date and artistic development. The caves formed part of the wider network of Digambara Jain religious establishments in western India. Lisa N. Owen argues that Ankai-Tankai, together with Ellora, developed as an important medieval Digambara pilgrimage centre and participated in networks linking Jain sacred places in northern and southern India. The Maharashtra Government Gazetteer places the Jain caves at Ankai among the later Jain cave complexes of Nashik district, distinguishing them from the earlier Buddhist and Brahmanical cave traditions of the Deccan.

== Caves ==
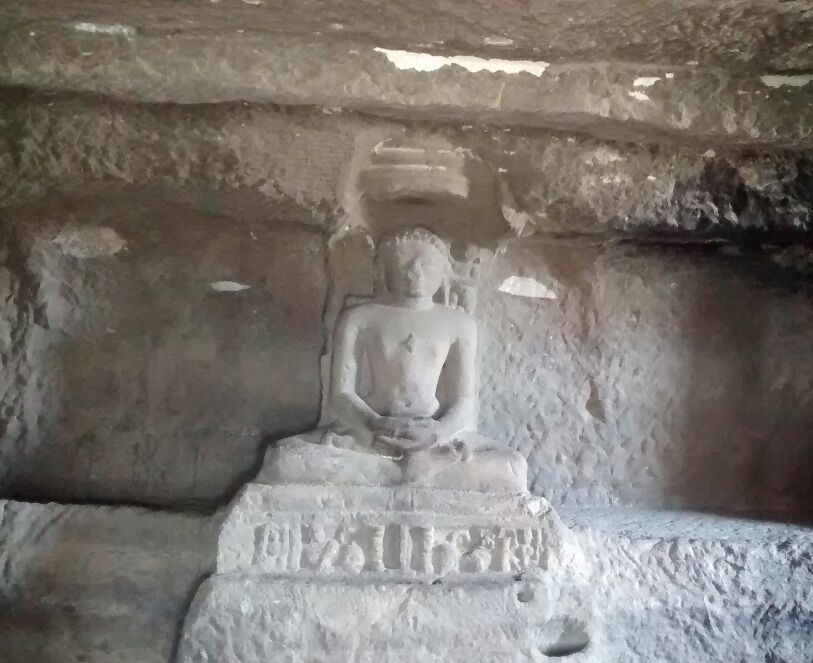
Tirthankara idol

The Jain group consists of ten excavations. The first two caves are particularly elaborate and are two-storeyed. Cave 1 contains halls and a shrine on both floors, while Cave 2 has a substantial architectural façade and sculptural decoration. Cave 3 has a verandah with a perforated screen wall and a vestibule leading to the shrine. Its façade contains sculptural representations of the Jain attendant deities Sarvanubhuti and Ambika, placed between pilasters and beneath a makara-torana. Other caves are less elaborate and contain shrines and halls of varying sizes. Cave 5 is unusual within the group because it lacks a sanctum.

== Architecture ==
The caves combine rock-cut halls, verandahs, shrines, pillars and sculptural decoration. The first two caves are two-storeyed, while the other excavations generally have simpler plans. The architectural forms have parallels with contemporary Jain structural and rock-cut architecture elsewhere in the Deccan. Cave 1 was designed with two levels. The lower storey contains a hall and shrine, while the upper storey repeats the basic arrangement. The upper hall was intended to be approximately square and contains pillars and a shrine at the rear. The caves demonstrate the increasing importance of image worship in medieval Jainism. Their shrines were intended to contain images of the Tirthankaras, while the halls and subsidiary sculptures provided space for devotional activity.

== Sculpture ==
The caves contain numerous images of Jain Tirthankaras and attendant deities. Sculptural representations include Parshvanatha, Mahavira, Rishabhanatha and other Tirthankaras. Jain iconographic features such as the attendant yakshas and yakshis, halos and throne motifs are used throughout the complex. Cave 3 contains life-sized figures of Sarvanubhuti and Ambika in its verandah. Ambika is shown with her characteristic lion mount, while Sarvanubhuti is represented with his associated attributes. The sculptural programme at Ankai-Tankai reflects the development of Jain iconography in Maharashtra during the later medieval period. Viraj Shah notes that Jain images at Ankai and other late cave sites increasingly display identifiable Tirthankara emblems (*lāñchhanas*), while other iconographic features also become more elaborate.

== Cave 3 ceiling ==
The ceiling of Cave 3 is particularly notable for its carved decoration. It includes representations of the dikpalas, or directional guardians, demonstrating the incorporation of broader Indian architectural and religious motifs into the Jain sculptural programme.

== Jain pilgrimage centre ==
Ankai-Tankai developed as a Digambara Jain religious centre during the medieval period. Owen argues that the site's location and monuments should be understood within the wider network of Jain pilgrimage centres that connected the northern and southern Deccan. The caves' location on a major route and their association with the fortified hills of Ankai-Tankai provided both strategic and religious significance. Shah observes that several Jain cave sites in Maharashtra, including Ankai-Tankai, are located on or near important routes and fortified hills, suggesting that commercial and political geography influenced the selection and development of these religious sites.

== Later history ==
The caves continued to be known after the medieval period, although their religious use changed over time. Cave 2 is currently associated with Hindu worship, illustrating the changing religious use of some of the caves. The Ankai-Tankai hills later became an important fortified site. The Jain caves therefore form part of a larger historical landscape containing religious, military and settlement remains from different periods.

== Significance ==
The Ankai-Tankai caves are among the most substantial Jain rock-cut monuments in Maharashtra outside Ellora. Their importance lies in the combination of multi-storeyed cave architecture, extensive Jain sculpture and evidence for the development of Digambara religious centres during the medieval period. The caves are also significant for the study of medieval Jain architecture because they preserve both architectural and iconographic evidence for the transition from earlier, relatively simple rock-cut Jain shrines to more elaborate image-centred temple complexes.

== See also ==
- Ankai Fort
- Ellora Caves
- Mangi-Tungi
- Tringalwadi
