= Ankai Fort =

Historic site in western India

- Part of Ajintha Satmal Hill Range
- Nashik district, Maharashtra
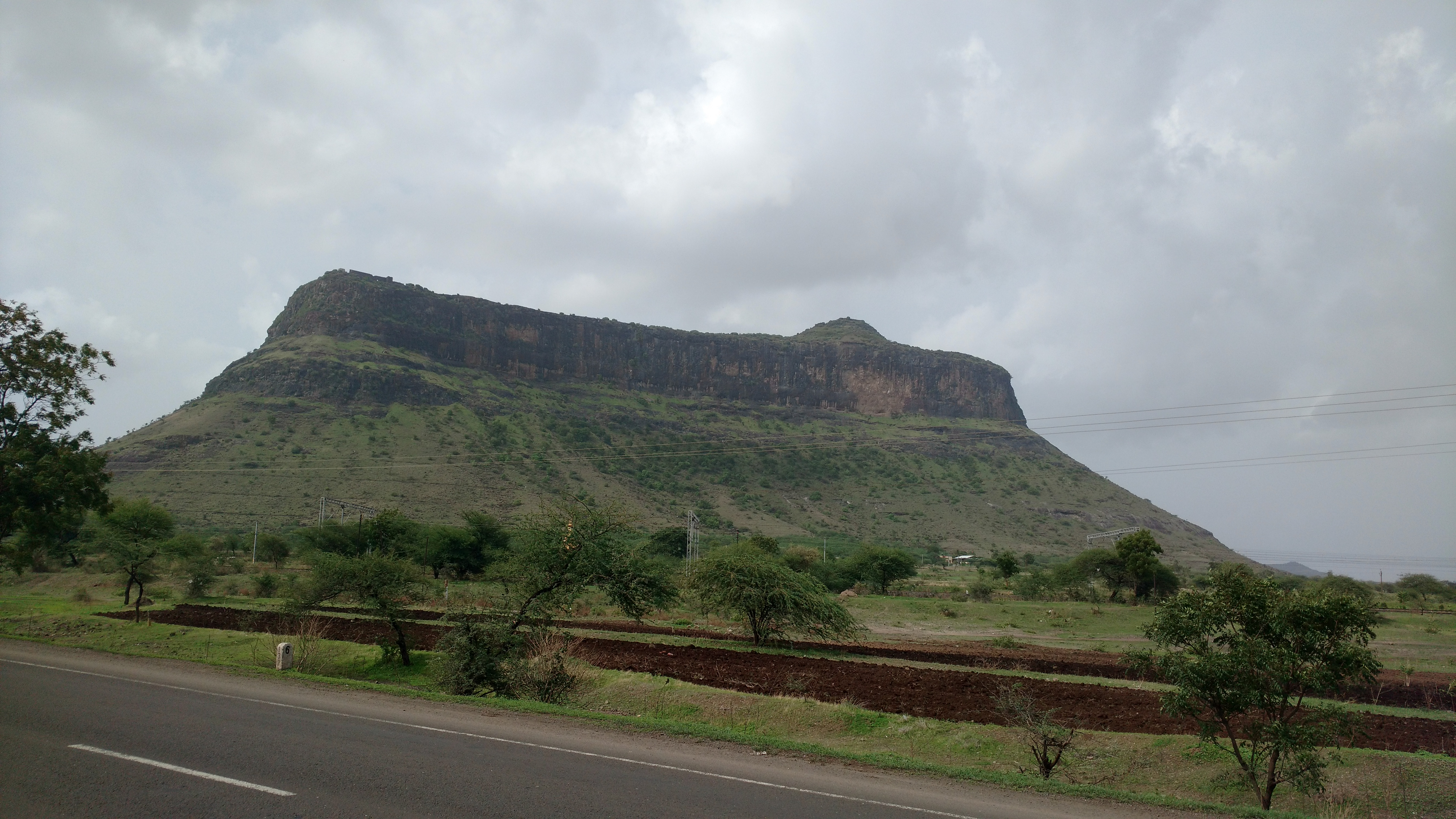
- Ankai fort from Highway

Site information
- Type: Hill fort
- Owner: Government of India
- Controlled by: Ahmadnagar (1521-1594); Mughal Empire (1594-1739); Maratha Empire (1739-1818); United Kingdom: East India Company (1818-1857); British Raj (1857-1947); India (1947-present)
- Open to the public: Yes
- Condition: In ruins

Location
- Shown within Maharashtra
- Location within Maharashtra
- Coordinates: 20°11′14″N 74°26′51.5″E
- Height: 966.22 M (3170 Ft)

Site history
- Materials: Stone

Ankai Fort is a historic site found in the Satmala Range hills in western India. It is located in Yeola Taluka of Nashik district in the state of Maharashtra. The fort was built by Yadava of Devgiri. Geographically, it is near Manmad. The Ankai fort and Tankai fort are two different forts on adjacent hills. A common fortification is constructed to secure both. The Ankai fort is located on a hill with perpendicular scarps on all the sides, except for a narrow nose on the eastern side.

== History ==
The Jain caves located at the foothills of the fort, spanning two levels. On the lower level there are two caves, neither of which has idols. On the upper level, there are five caves which feature Mahavir idols in good condition. They are secured by lock and key at night to avoid vandalism. There are carvings of Yaksha, Indrani, lotus and Lord Mahavir in the main cave. the fort at the base of the fort depict that Ankai was constructed around 1000 years ago. The fort was built by Yadava of Devgiri. Mughals led by Shah Jahan's General Khan Khanan captured this fort in 1635 by bribing the fort commander. In 1665, Thévenot mentions these forts as a stage on the journey between the cities of Surat and Aurangabad. Ankai was ultimately captured by the Moghals. In 1752, the fort came under control of the Maratha Empire after the Treaty of Bhalki. It was subsequently captured by the British in 1818.

== How to reach ==
The nearest town is Manmad which is 97 kilometers from Nashik. The base village of the fort is Ankai which is 10 kilometers from Manmad. There are three routes to reach Ankai from Nashik. The shortest and safest is via Manmad, the other two are via Vinchur-Lasalgaon-Patoda (85 km) and via Yeola (108 km). There are hotels in Manmad, and tea and snacks are also available in small eateries on the highway. The Ankai railway station is quite close to the village. Local passenger trains passing on the Manmad-Nizamabad route stop at the railway station. The trekking path starts from the hillock north of the Ankai village. The route is free from obstruction and is safe and wide with regular steps to the fort. It takes about half an hour to reach the entrance gate of the fort. It takes about 3 hours to see both the forts. It is advisable to first visit the Ankai fort in the early hours of the morning and complete the Tankai fort before evening.

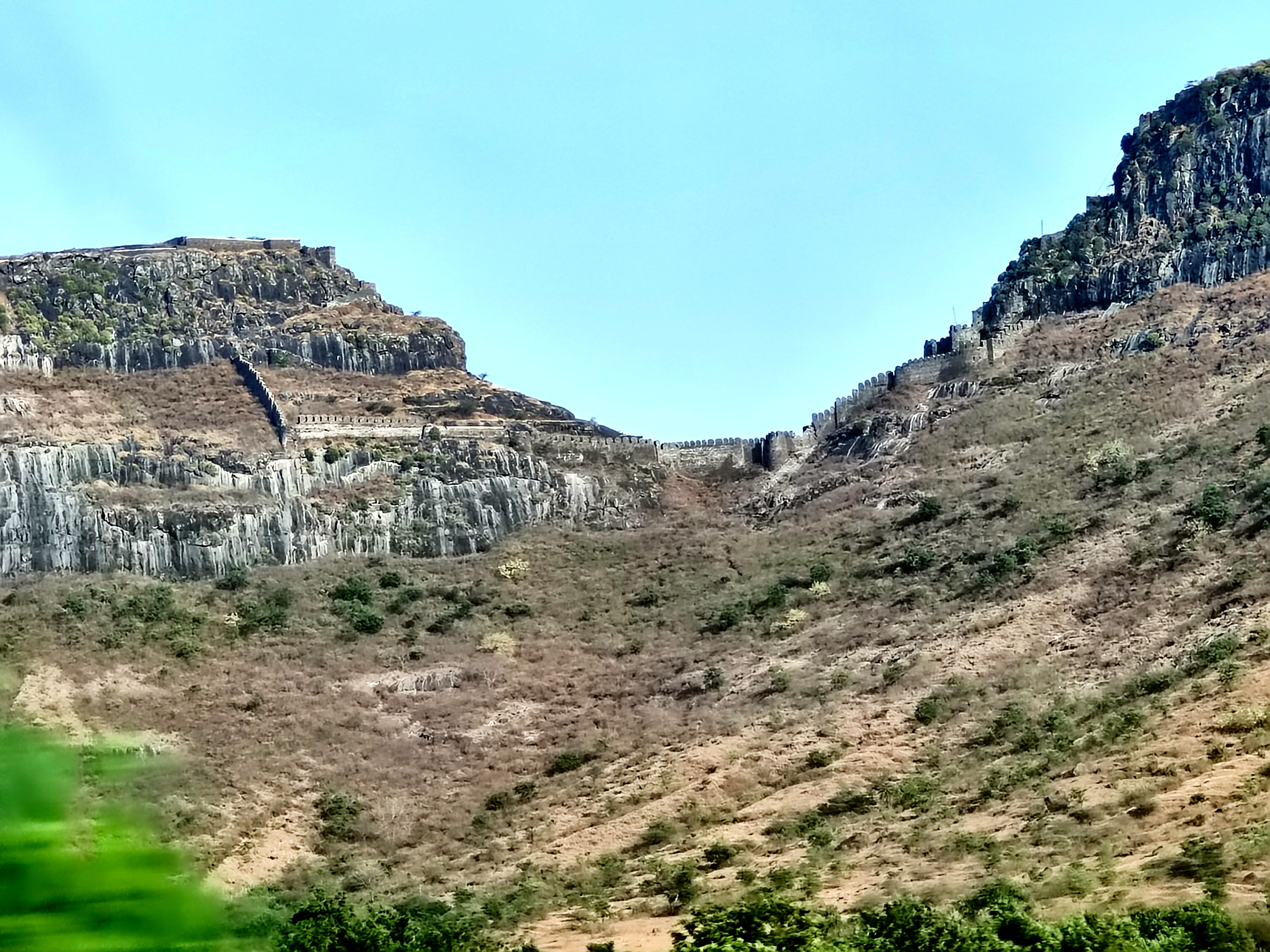
Ankai Fort from Train

== Places to see ==
There are a lot of places to be seen around the fort, including:

The Jain caves located at the foothills of the fort, spanning two levels. On the lower level there are two caves, neither of which has idols. On the upper level, there are five caves which feature Mahavir idols in good condition. They are secured by lock and key at night to avoid vandalism. There are carvings of Yaksha, Indrani, lotus and Lord Mahavir in the main cave.

The Main Gate is located south of the hill, featuring well preserved woodwork.

The Manmad Gate is on the Northern side of the col facing Manmad city.

The Brahmani (Hindu) Caves are near the entrance gate to the upper plateau of Ankai fort. They are in ruins, but the idols of Jai and Vijay carved out of rock and the Shivinga can still be seen.

The Palace and Kashi Pond On the western edge of the plateau is a large palace in a dilapidated condition. Only the walls of the palace remain. Among the rock cut cisterns on the way to the palace is the Kashi pond, with a holy Tulsi pot engraved in rock placed in the center of the pond.

There is a series of rock-cut water cisterns on the southern side of the fort. It takes about two hours to visit all the attractions on the fort.

== Gallery ==
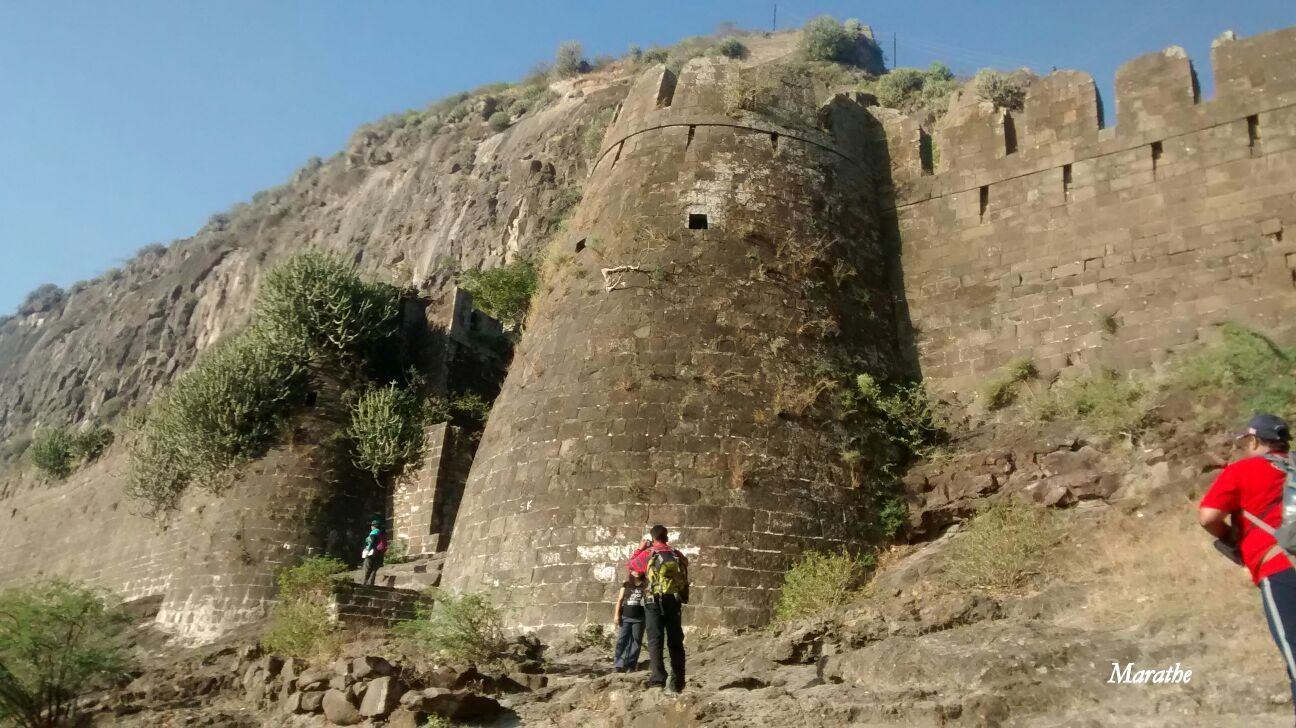
Main gate of the Fort

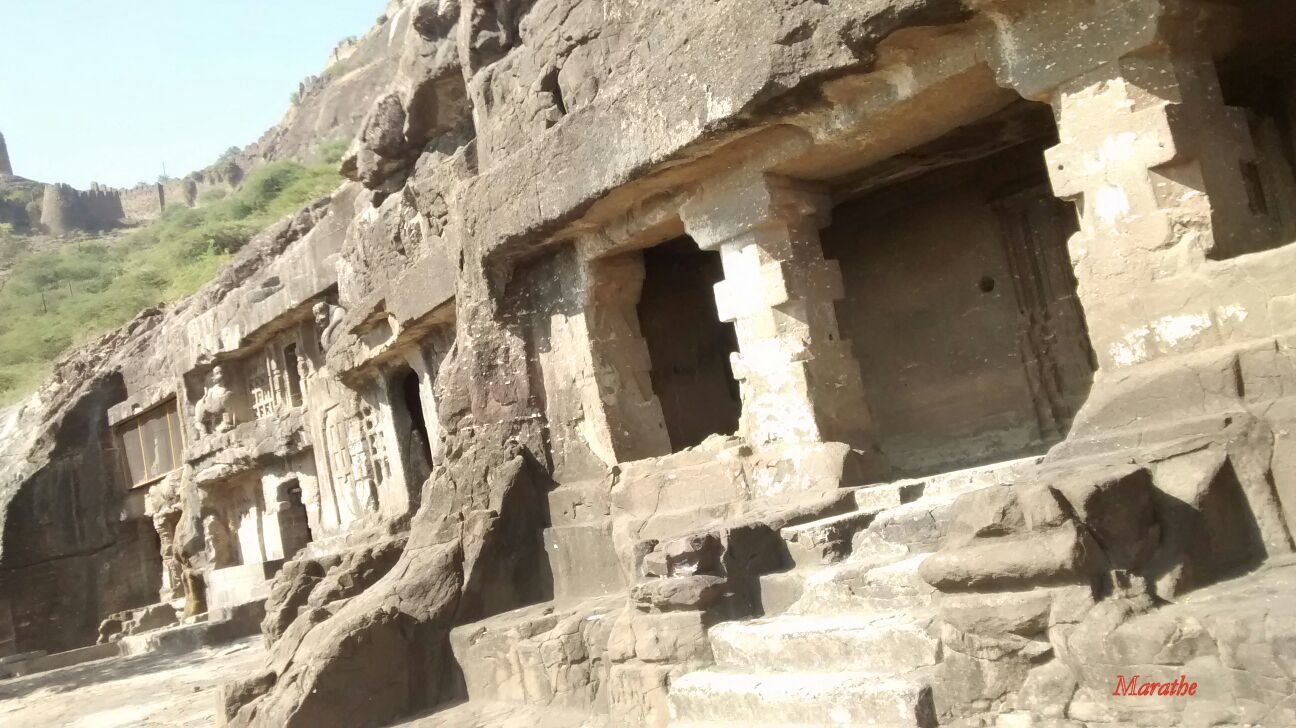
Jain caves

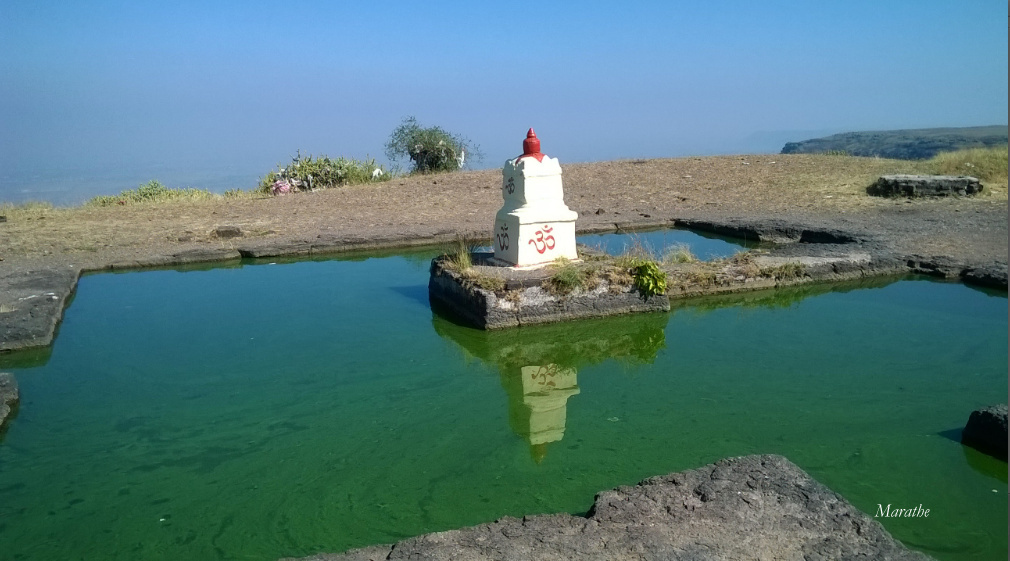
Kashi Pond

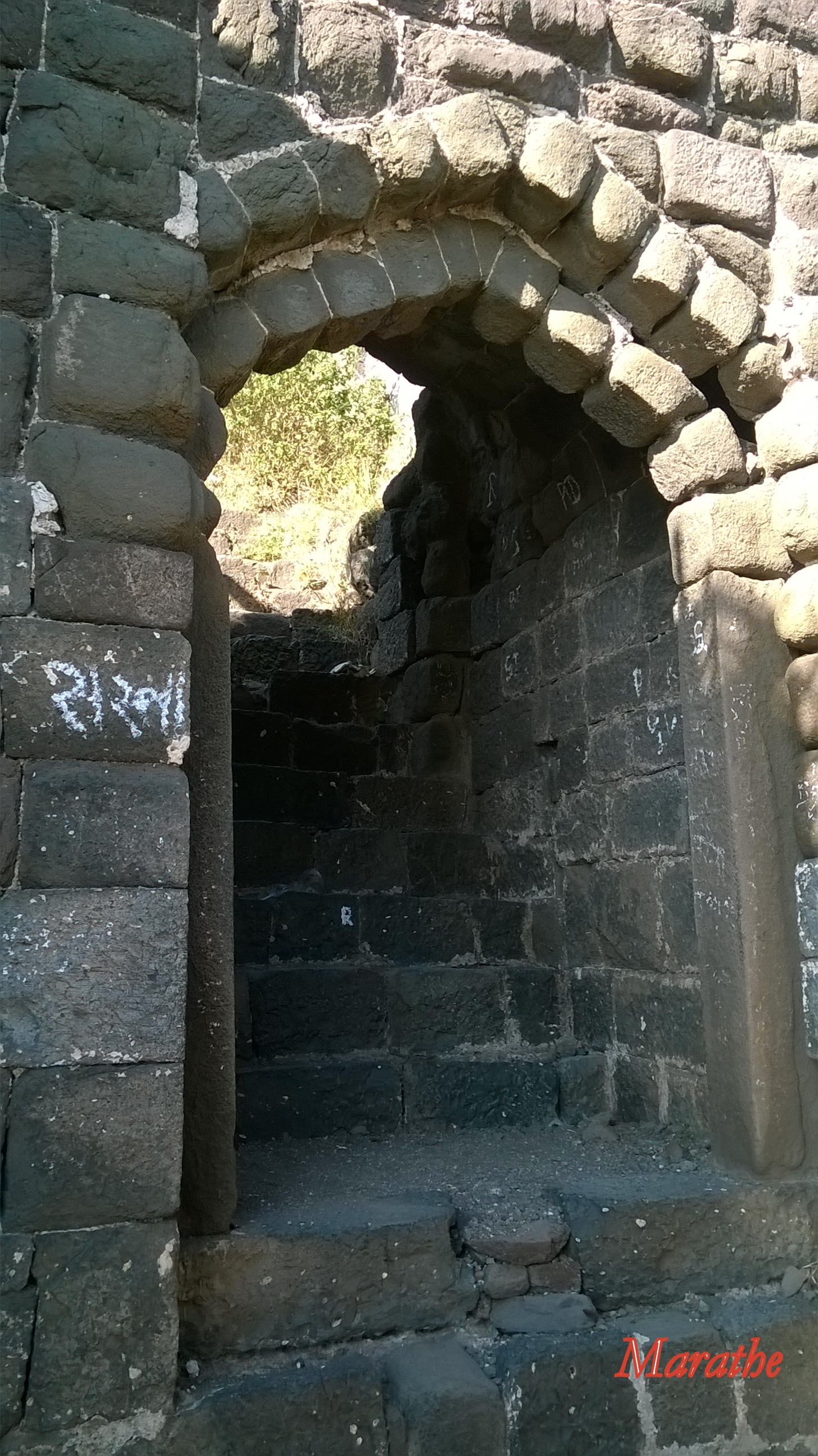
Entrance gate

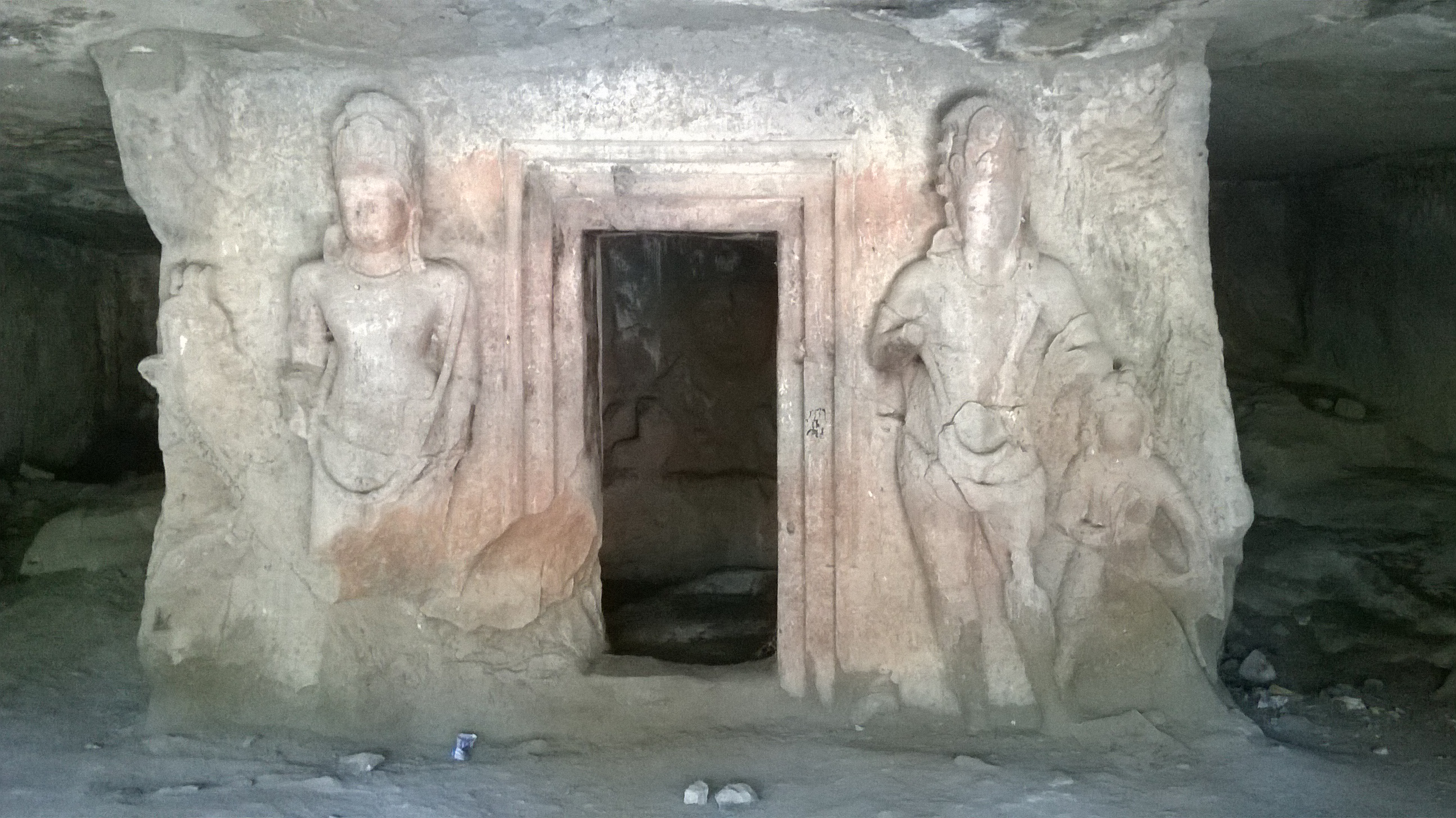
The Hindu cave with jai-Vijay

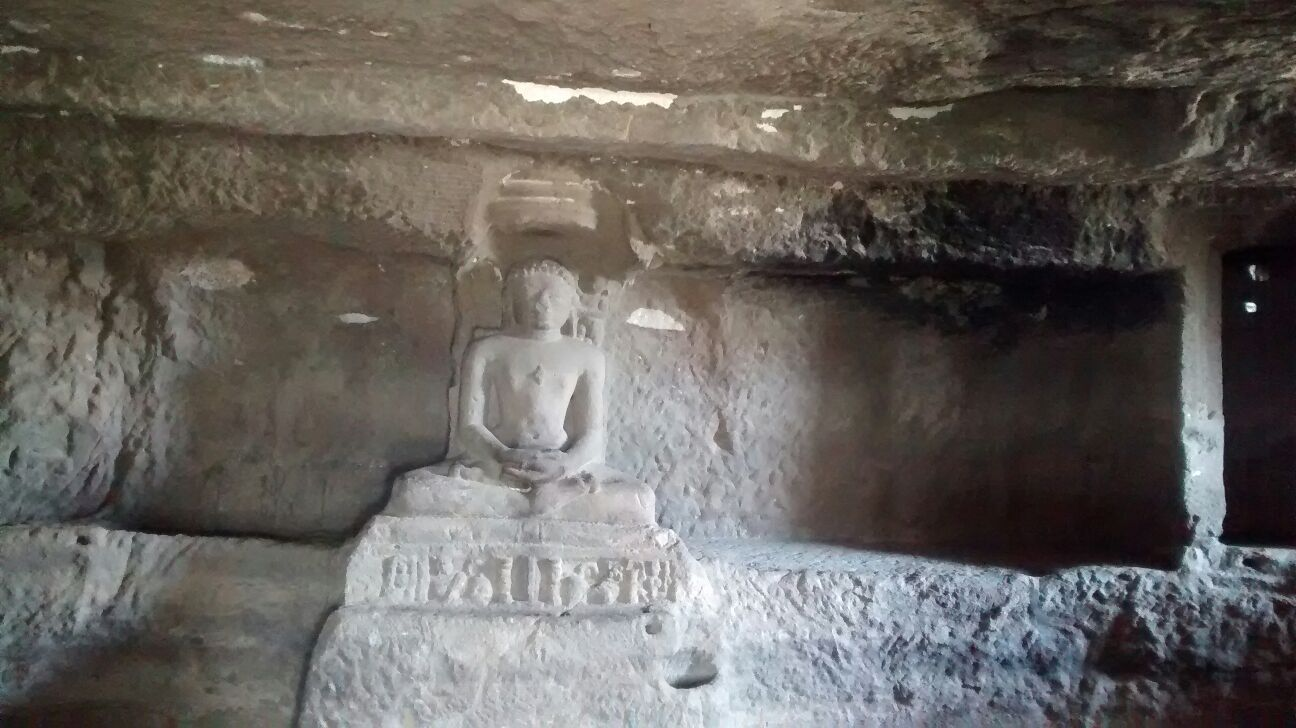
The Jain Cave

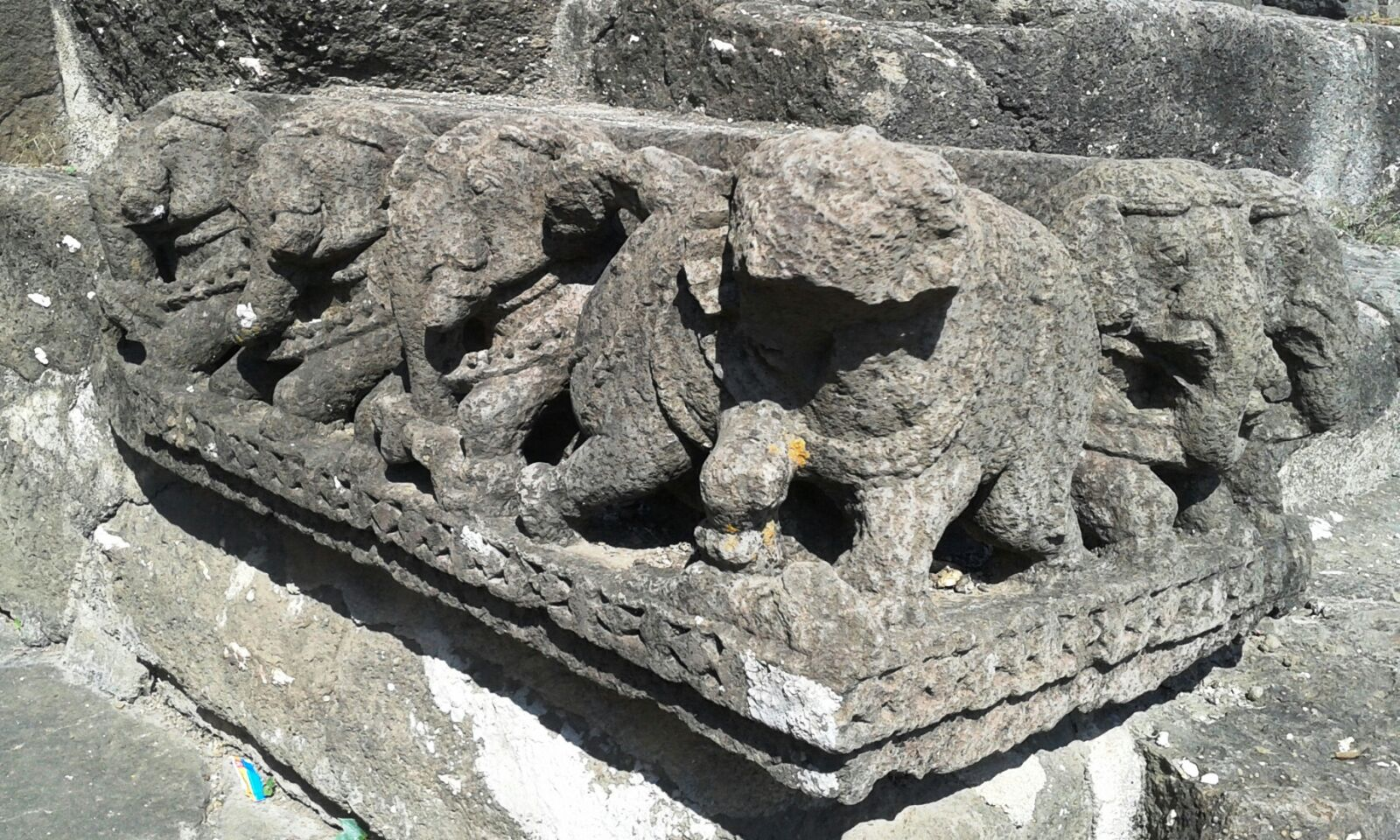
Wada or Palace

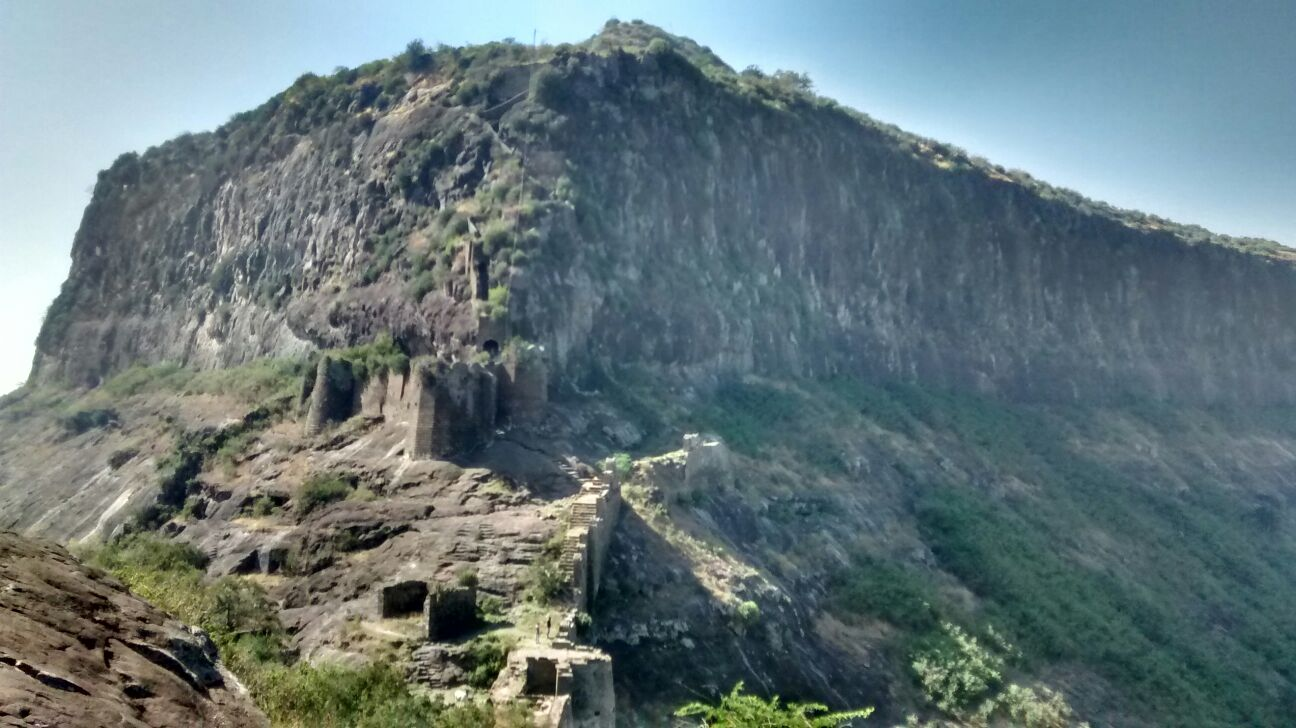
Ankai fort from Tankai

== See also ==
- List of forts in Maharashtra
- List of forts in India
- List of Maratha dynasties and states
- Maratha War of Independence
- Battles involving the Maratha Empire
- Military history of India
