= Tankai fort =

Hill fort in Maharashtra, India

Tankai Fort
- Nashik district, Maharashtra
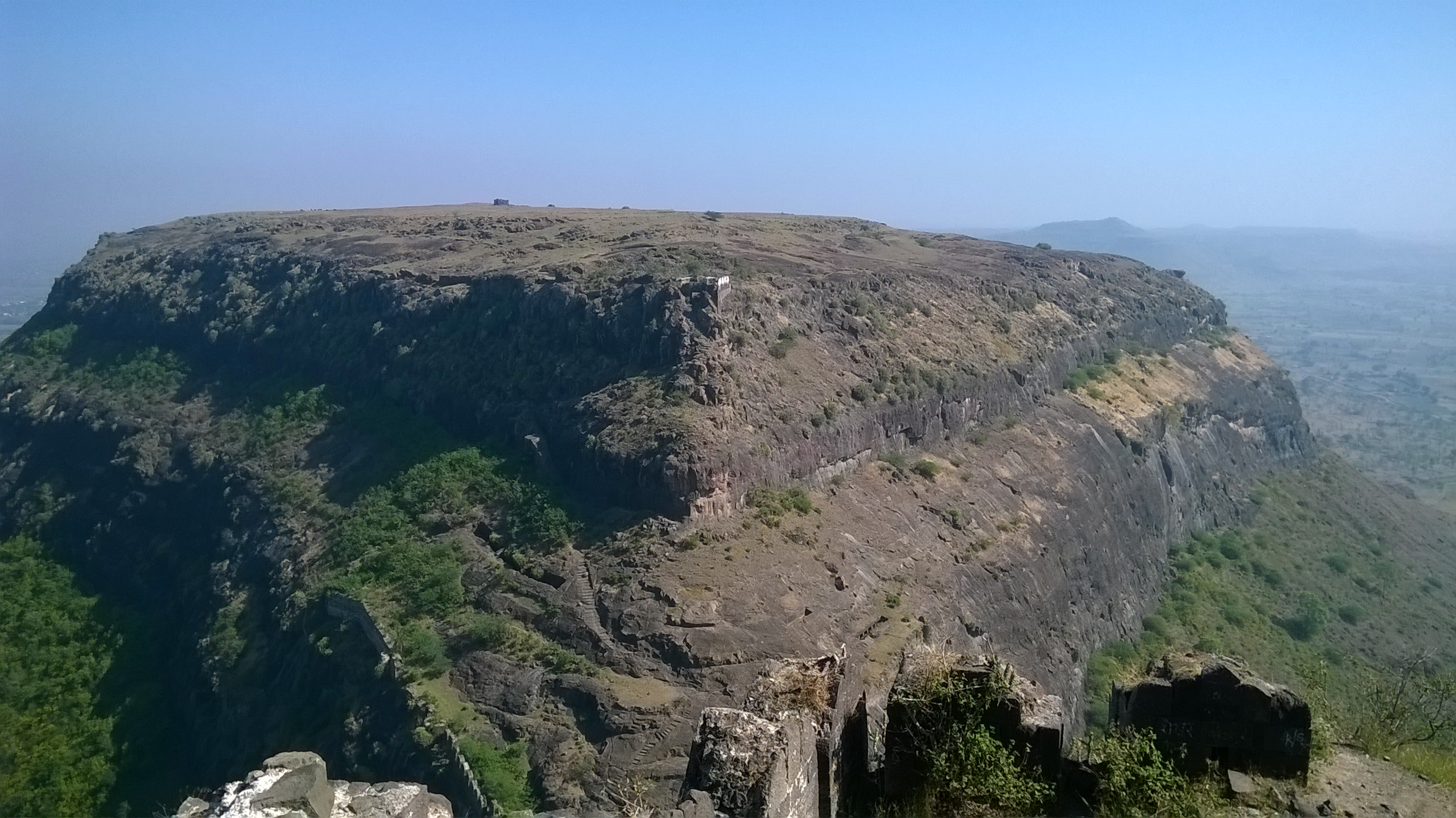
- Tankai fort viewed from Ankai

Site information
- Type: Hill fort
- Owner: Government of India
- Open to the public: Yes
- Condition: Ruins

Location
- Shown within Maharashtra
- Coordinates: 20°11′28.6″N 74°27′16.4″E
- Height: 966.22 M (3170 Ft)

Site history
- Built: 12th century
- Built by: Yadav of Devgiri
- Materials: Stone

Tankai fort is a hill, part of the Satmala Range, with the ruins of a large Maratha hill fort on the peak. With Ankai Fort near this fort are known as Ankai-Tankai, the strongest hill fort in the Nashik district, rises about 900 feet above the plain and 3200 feet above the sea. It is located from Manmad in Yeola taluka of Nashik district in Maharashtra, India.
