= Tringalwadi =

Fort named after the Tringalwadi Village

Tringalwadi Fort
- Nashik district, Maharashtra
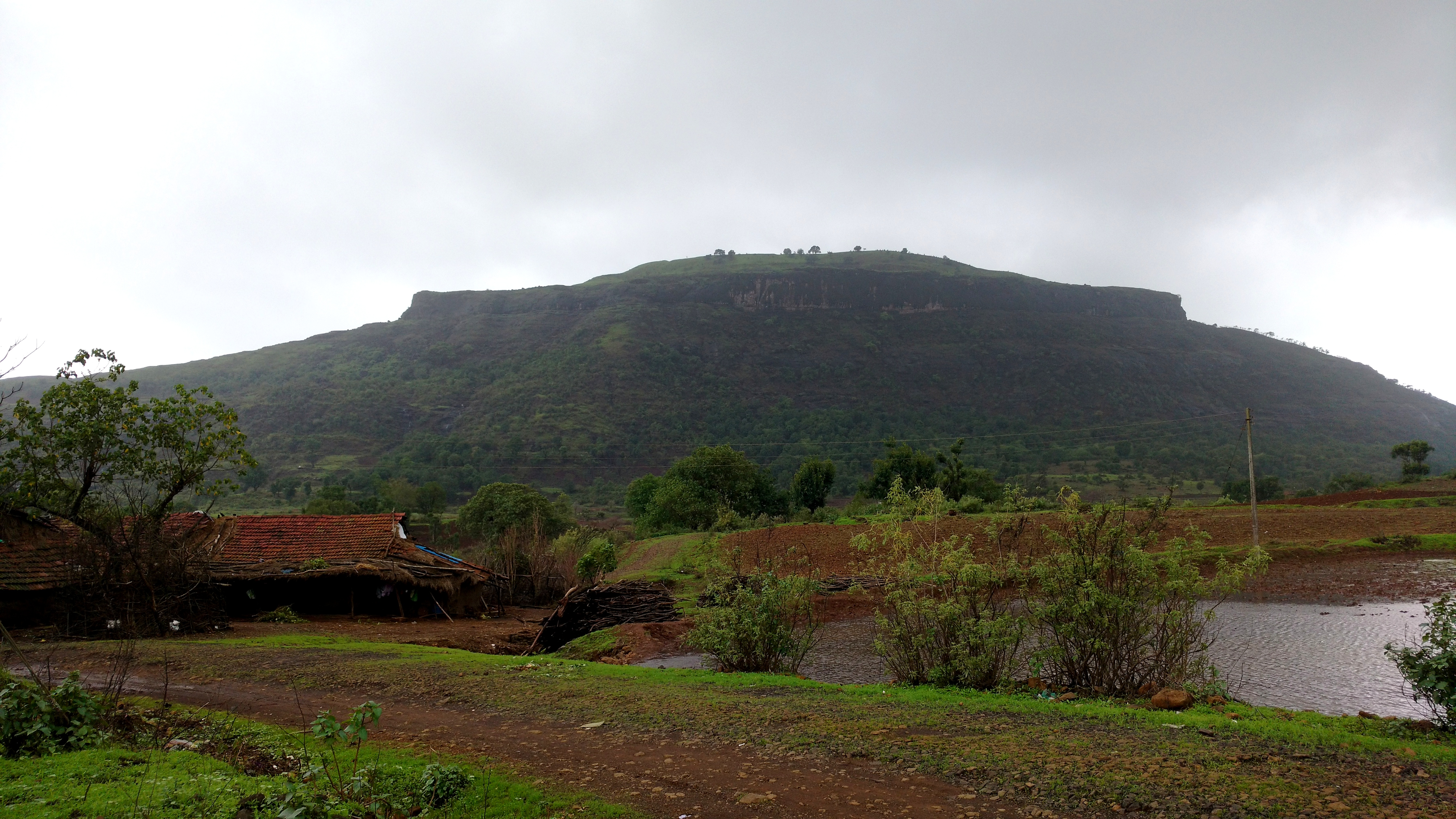
- Tringalwadi fort from Tringalwadi village

Site information
- Type: Hill fort
- Owner: Government of India
- Open to the public: Yes
- Condition: Ruins

Location
- Shown within Maharashtra
- Location within Maharashtra
- Coordinates: 19°44′16″N 73°32′10.8″E
- Height: 3238 feet

Site history
- Materials: Stone
- Demolished: 1818

Tringalwadi Fort is located in the Igatpuri taluka of Nashik district. It lies on an ancient trade route passing through the Thal Ghat, near the Tringalwadi village. The village also has an irrigation dam built in 1978.

== How to reach ==
The village Tringalwadi is located 7 km from Igatpuri. Igatpuri is located on Mumbai-nashik Railway route as well as National Highway NH 160. There are two routes to reach the village Tringalwadi from Igatpuri first one passes through Igatpuri town and the other is by taking a northern exit to NH160 at Ghoti, further passing through village Balayaduri. The Tringalwadi fort is located on a hill which runs north-south. It is a mesa rock formation. The climb is very easy and takes about 30 minutes to reach the top of the fort from the village.

== History ==
The presence of the caves indicate that the caves and the fort might be constructed around 10th century. The fort was built to overlook the trade route which connected Konkan to Nashik area. In 1636 the Shahaji (father of king Shivaji) had to cede it to the Mughals after the defeat at Mahuli fort. It is not known when his son Shivaji took control of this fort, but in 1688 this fort was won by Mughals. It is one of the 16 forts which was surrendered to the British in 1818 after the fall of Trymbakgad fort.

== Places to see ==
At the foothills of the fort is a Jain cave temple with a beautifully carved entrance and a stone idol of the first Jain Tirthankara Rishabhanatha in the garbha gruha (sanctum sanctorum). The cave has a large sabha mandapa (assembly hall). The western entrance to the fort is a unique structure of architecture. The steps and the entrance gate are carved from a single rock.

There is an idol of Hanuman near the entrance gate and two Sharabha idols carved on the top of the entrance gate. On the fort are ruins of old buildings and a small Goddess Bhavani temple. There is a cave and a rock cut water cistern on the western side of the hillock on the fort.

== See also ==
- List of forts in Maharashtra
- Nashik

== Gallery ==
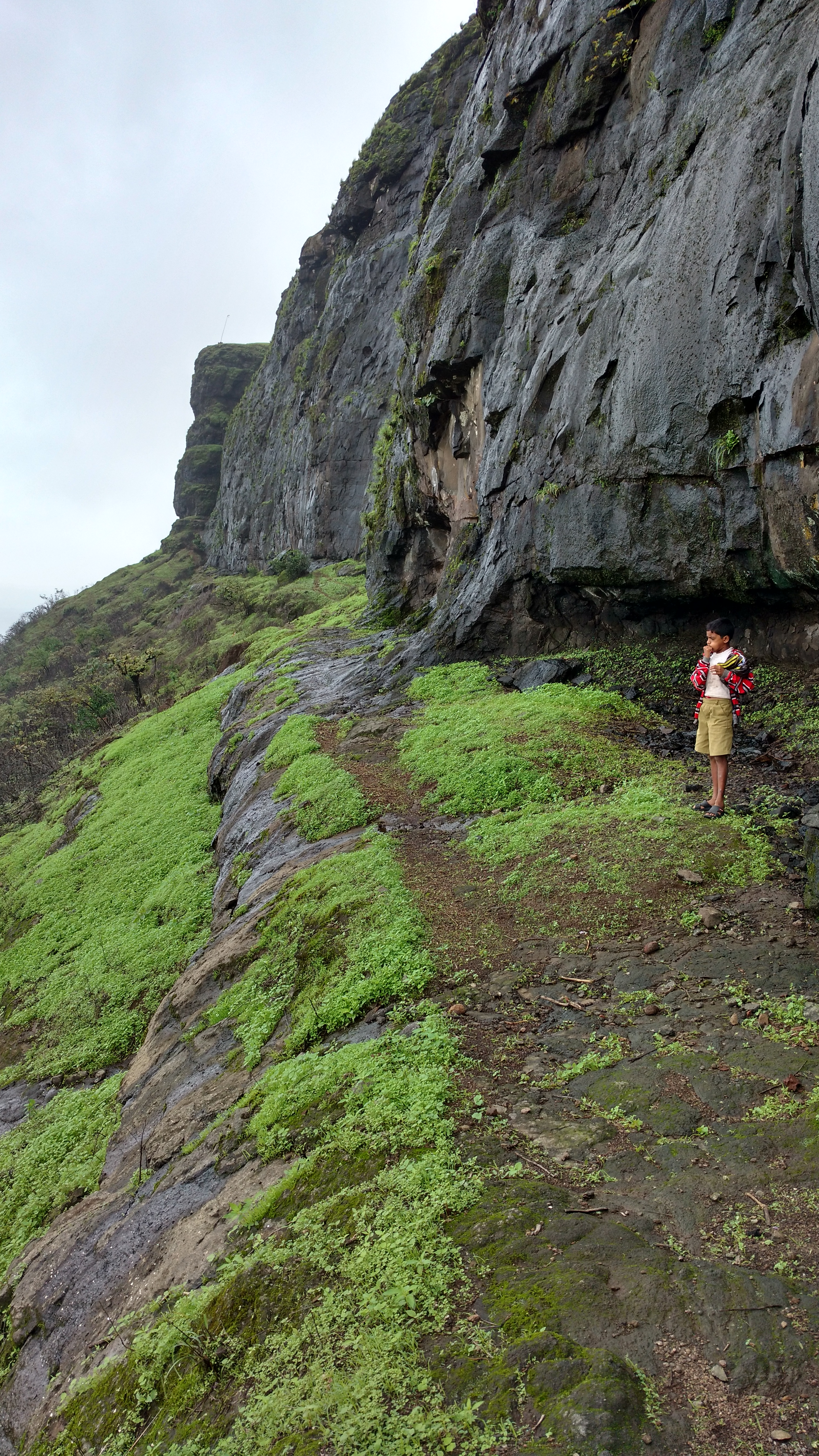
The walk way below the scarp

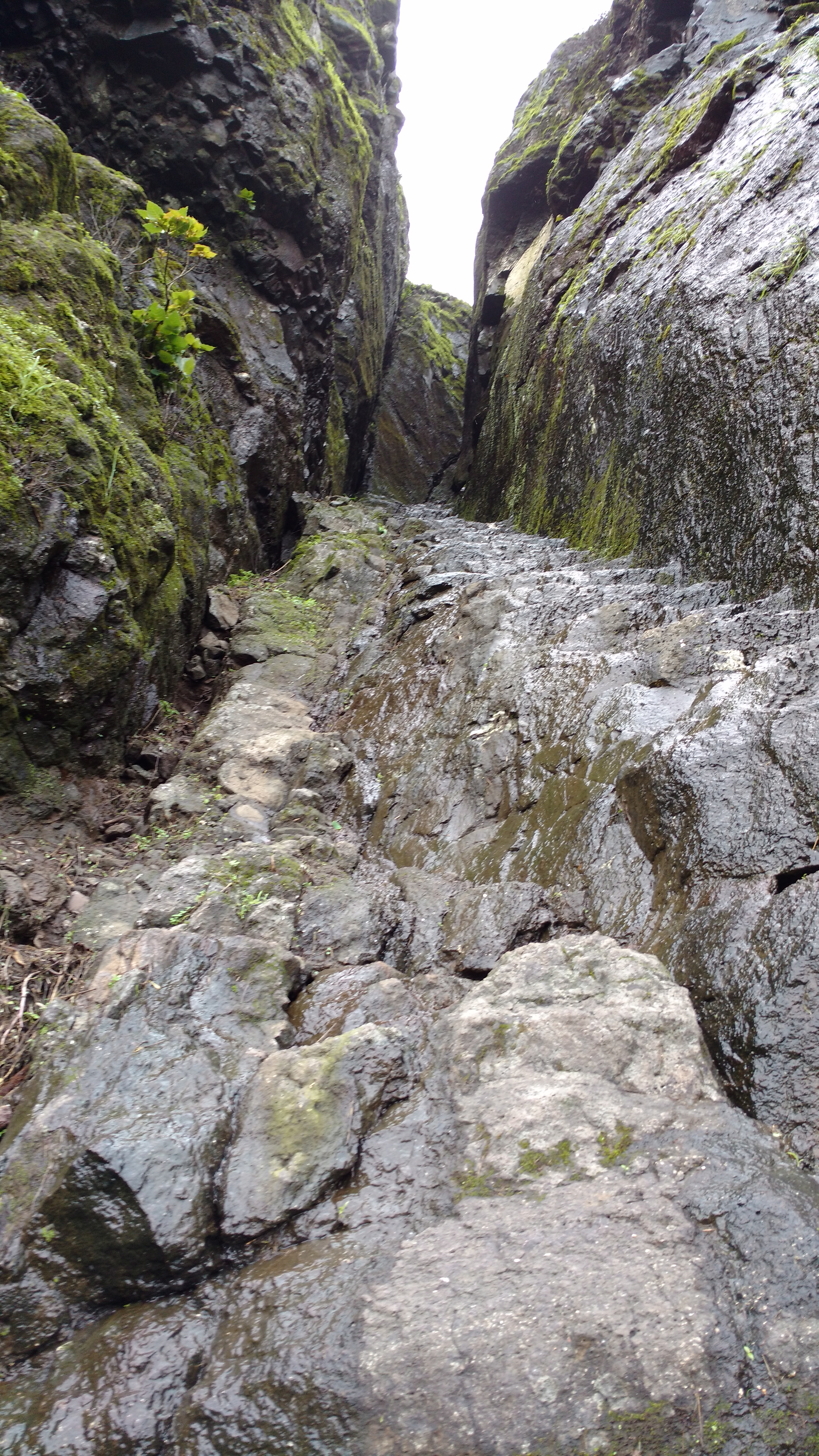
The western entrance gate

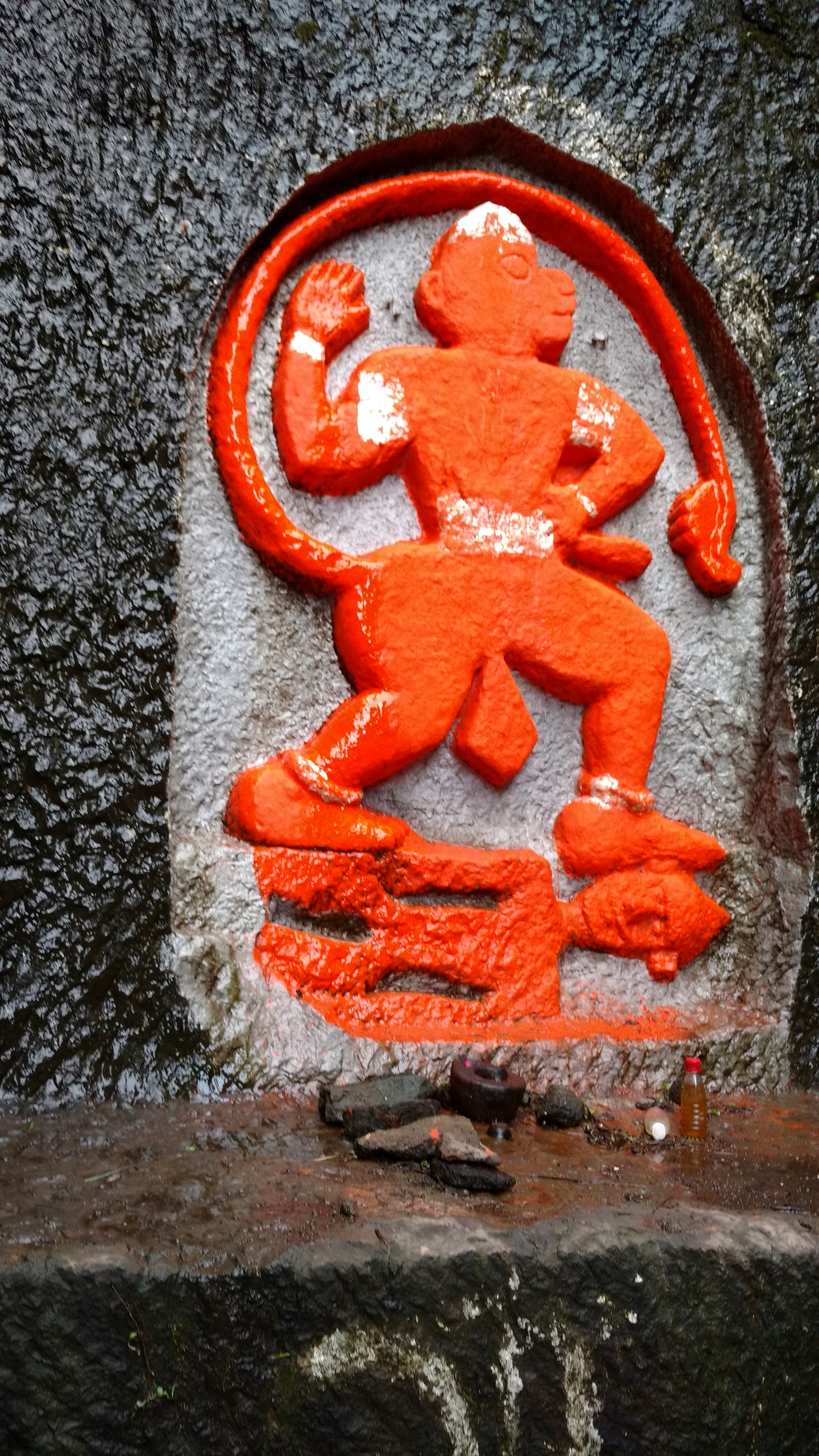
Veer maruti idol

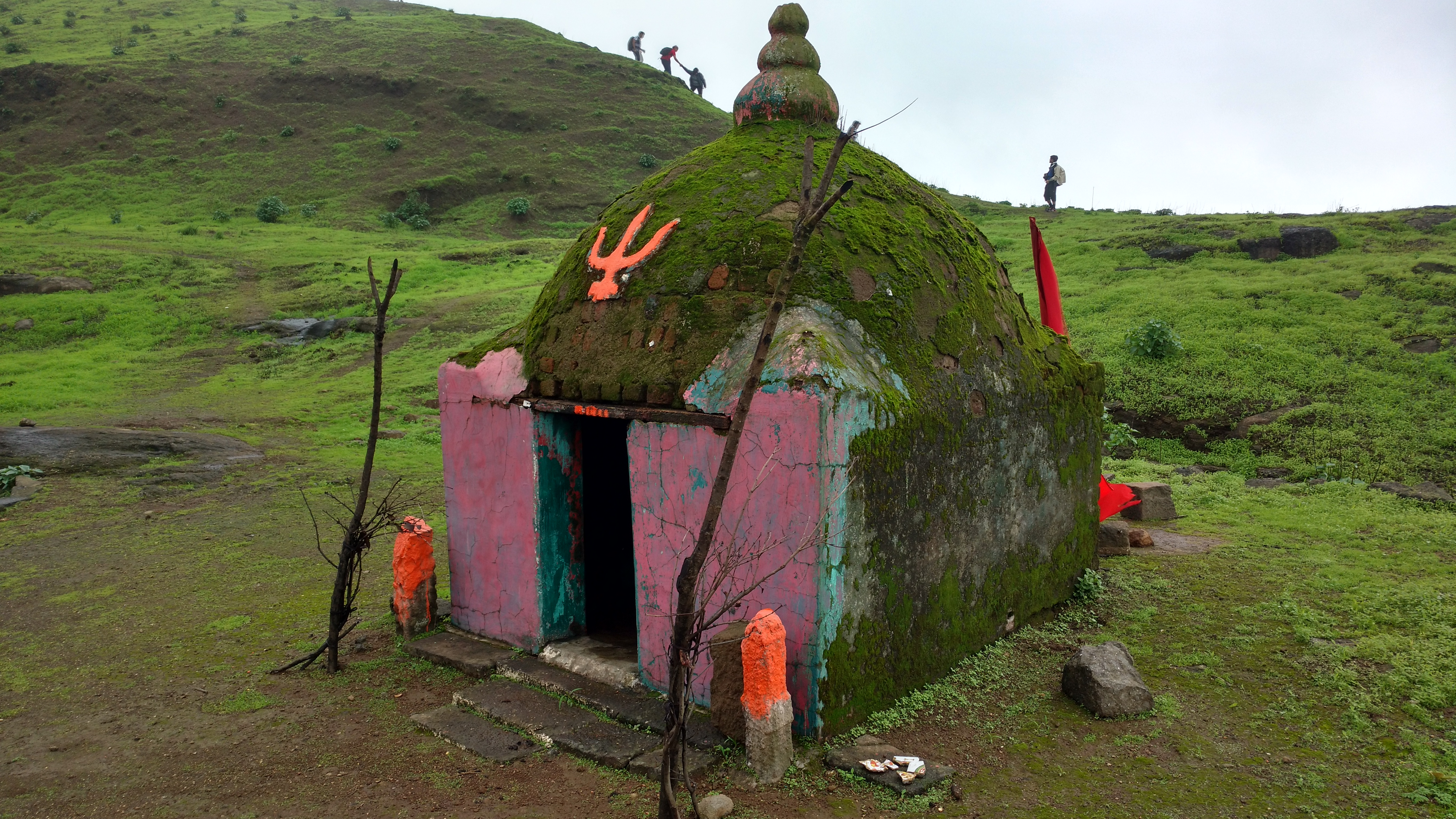
Bhavani mata temple

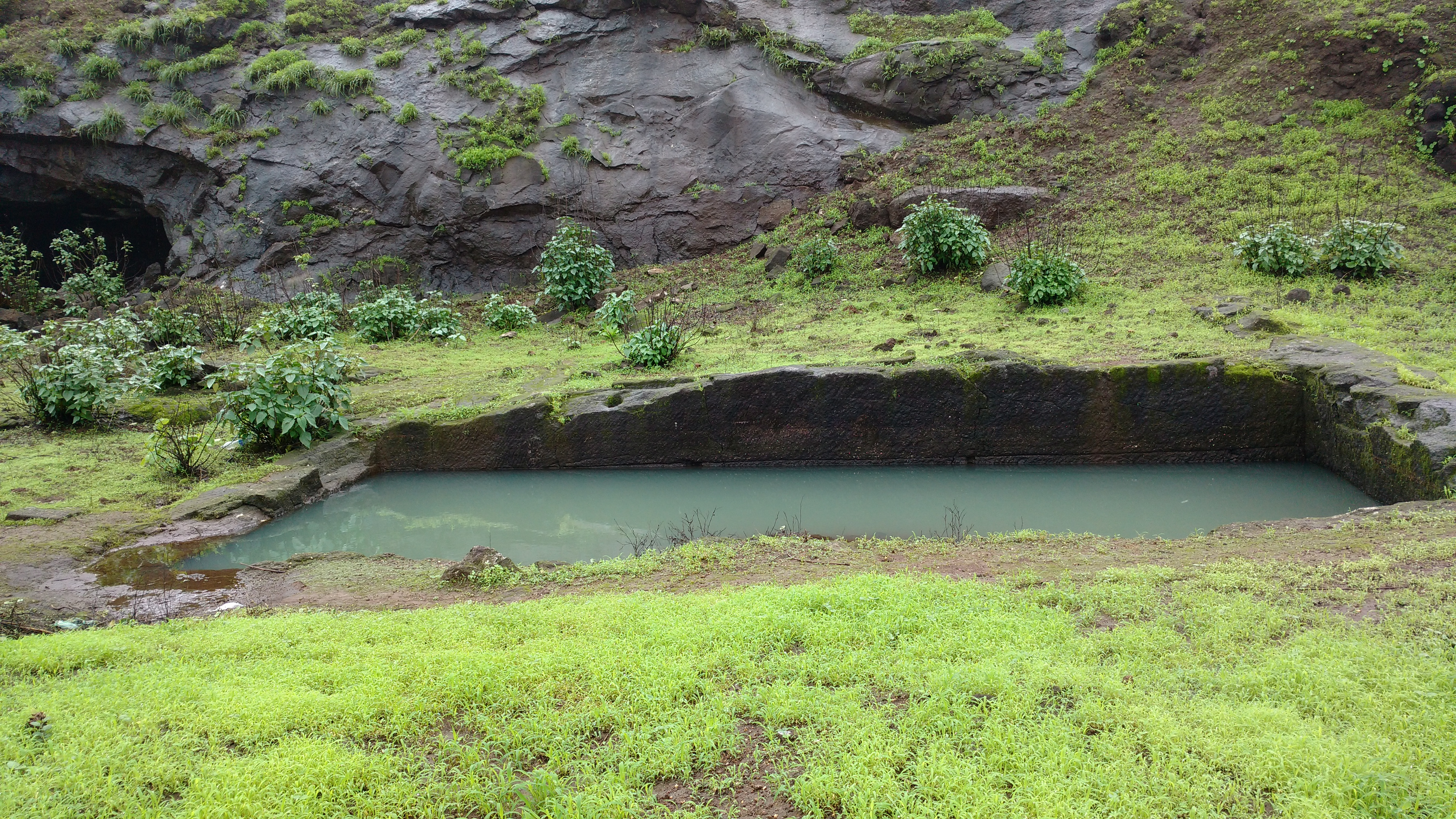
Rock cut water cistern
