= JAC Sunray =

Chinese van

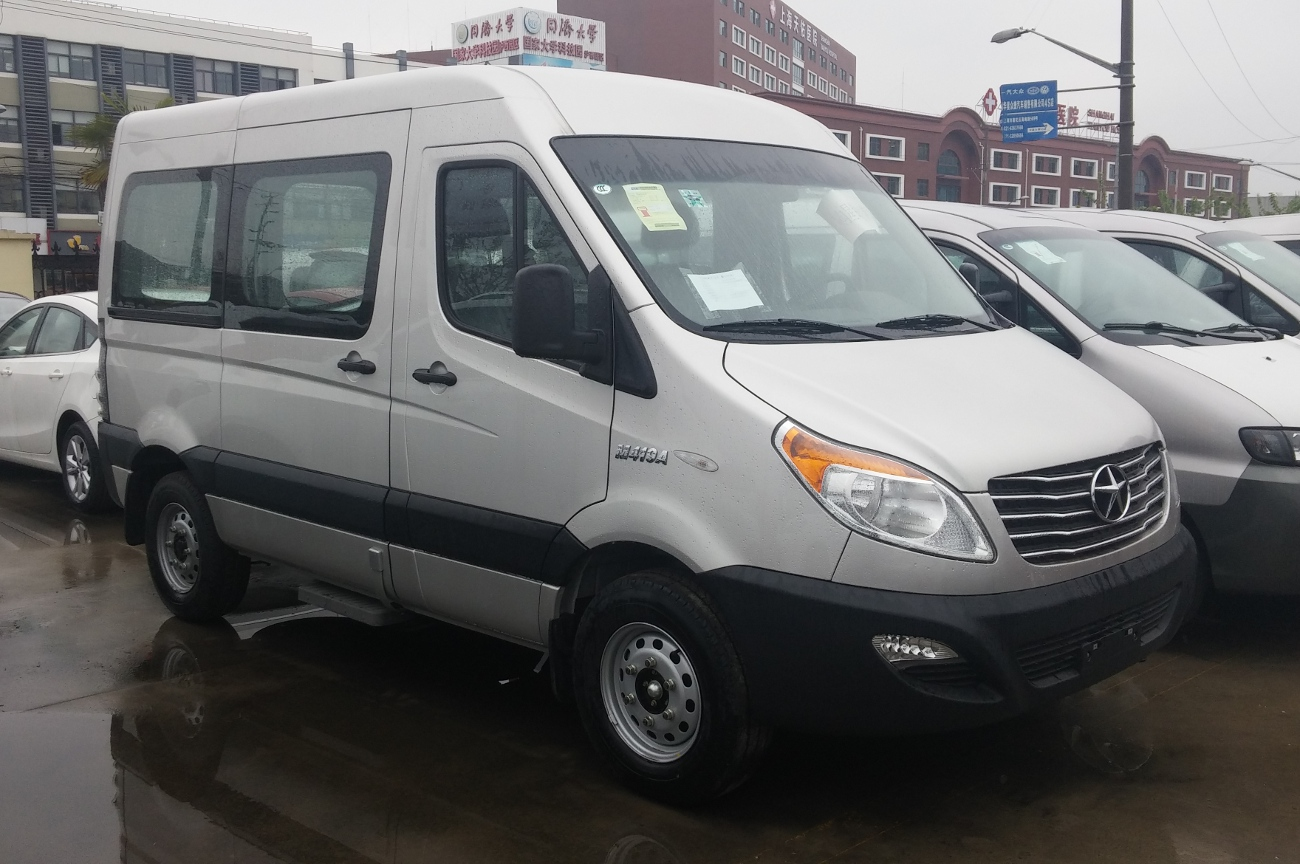
- JAC Sunray (SWB)

Overview
- Manufacturer: JAC Group
- Also called: MAZ 281; MAZ 3650; Ankai T5/Q5; Sollers Atlant/SF5 (Russia)
- Production: 2010–present
- Assembly: China: Hefei

Body and chassis
- Body style: 4-door van 4-door minibus 2-door pickup truck

Powertrain
- Engine: 2.0 L I4 (diesel); 1.9 L 'D19TDIE11' I4 (turbo diesel); 2.7 L I4 (turbo diesel); 2.8 L I4 (turbo diesel)
- Transmission: 6-speed manual

The JAC Sunray (Chinese: 星锐) is a van produced by JAC Group from China.

== History ==
The Sunray was introduced in China in 2010 during the 2010 Guangzhou Auto Show with prices ranging from 168,000 yuan to 198,000 yuan. Prices of the JAC Sunray were later adjusted to 109,700 yuan to 217,800 yuan.

The JAC Motors was announced in 2018 that the assembly of the JAC Sunray vans and minibuses will start at MAZ factory in Brest, Belarus. MAZ would produce the Sunray vehicles under their own brand, with the new models being sold as the MAZ 281 and MAZ 3650. The components for the MAZ-built Sunray vehicles will be imported from China.

== Engines ==
The engine options of the JAC Sunray includes a 2.0 liter inline-four diesel engine, a 2.7 liter inline-four turbo diesel engine, and a 2.8 liter inline-four diesel engine developed by JAC, capable of producing 122 hp (88 kW) and a torque of 280N·m.

=== Design controversies ===
Despite JAC claiming that the exterior design of the JAC Sunray model was designed by the JAC Italian design centre located in Turin, and the interior design by the JAC Japanese design studio in Tokyo using “European advanced products as the benchmark”, the exterior design is still controversial as the styling heavily resembles the Mercedes-Benz Sprinter.

== Gallery ==
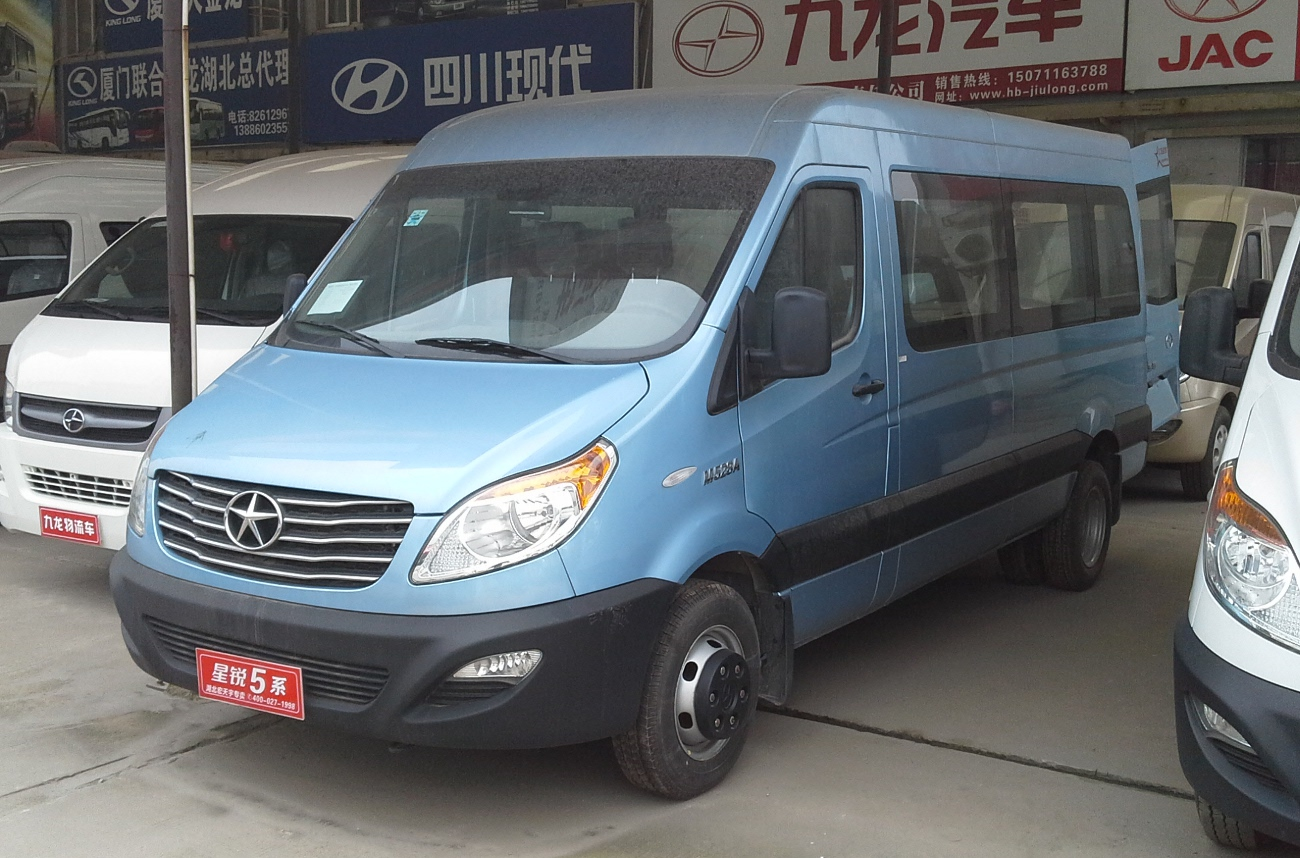
JAC Sunray (LWB)

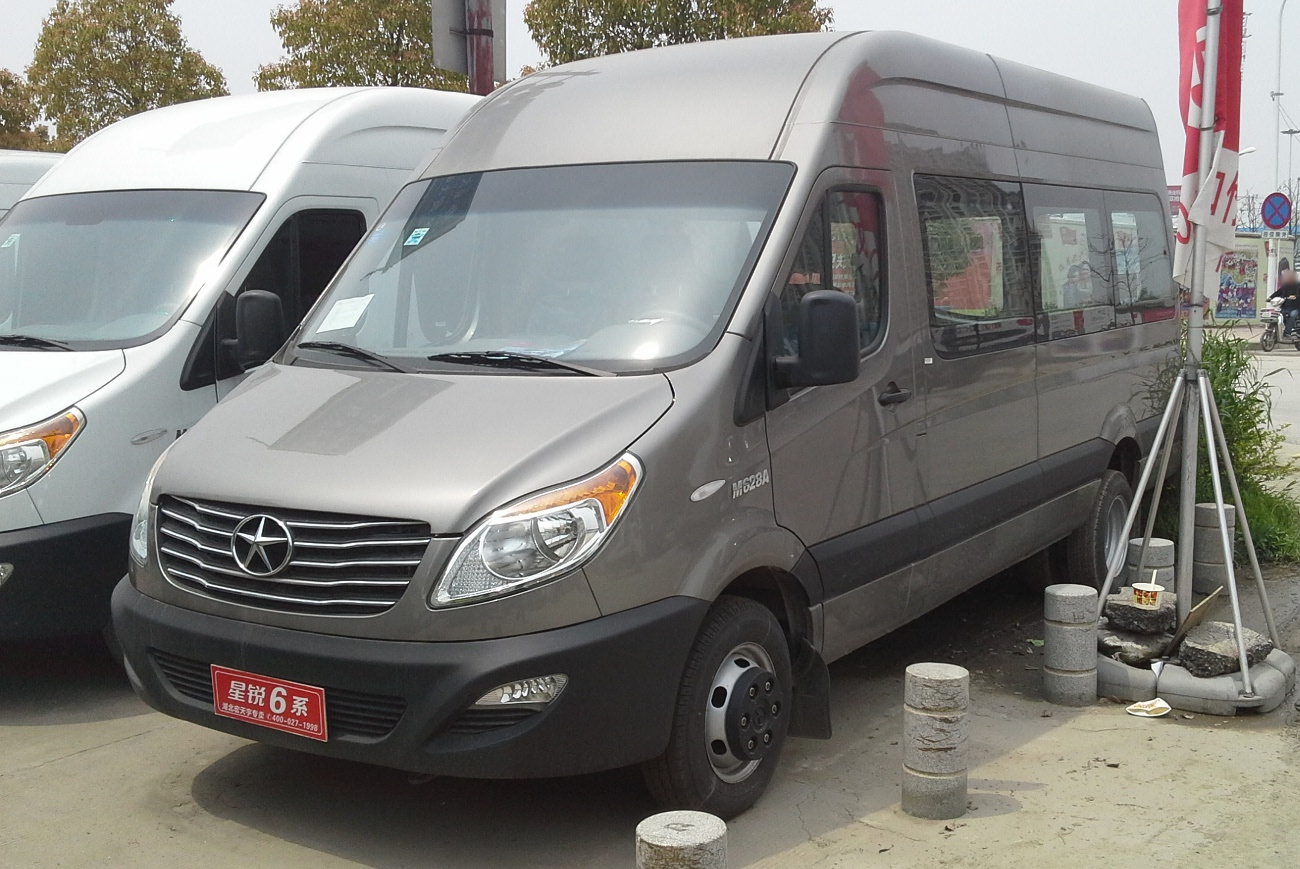
JAC Sunray (LWB, tall roof)

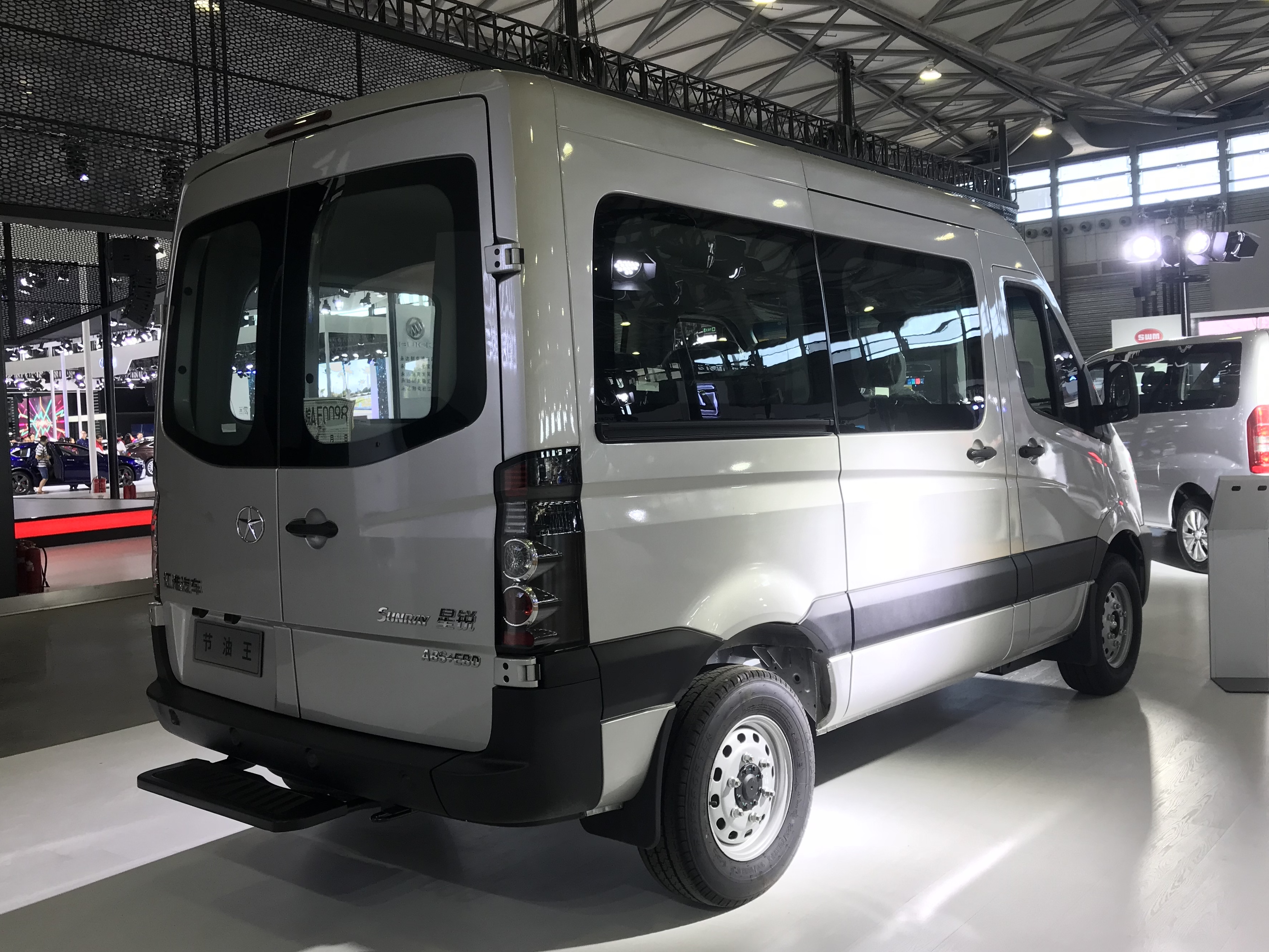
Rear view (SWB)

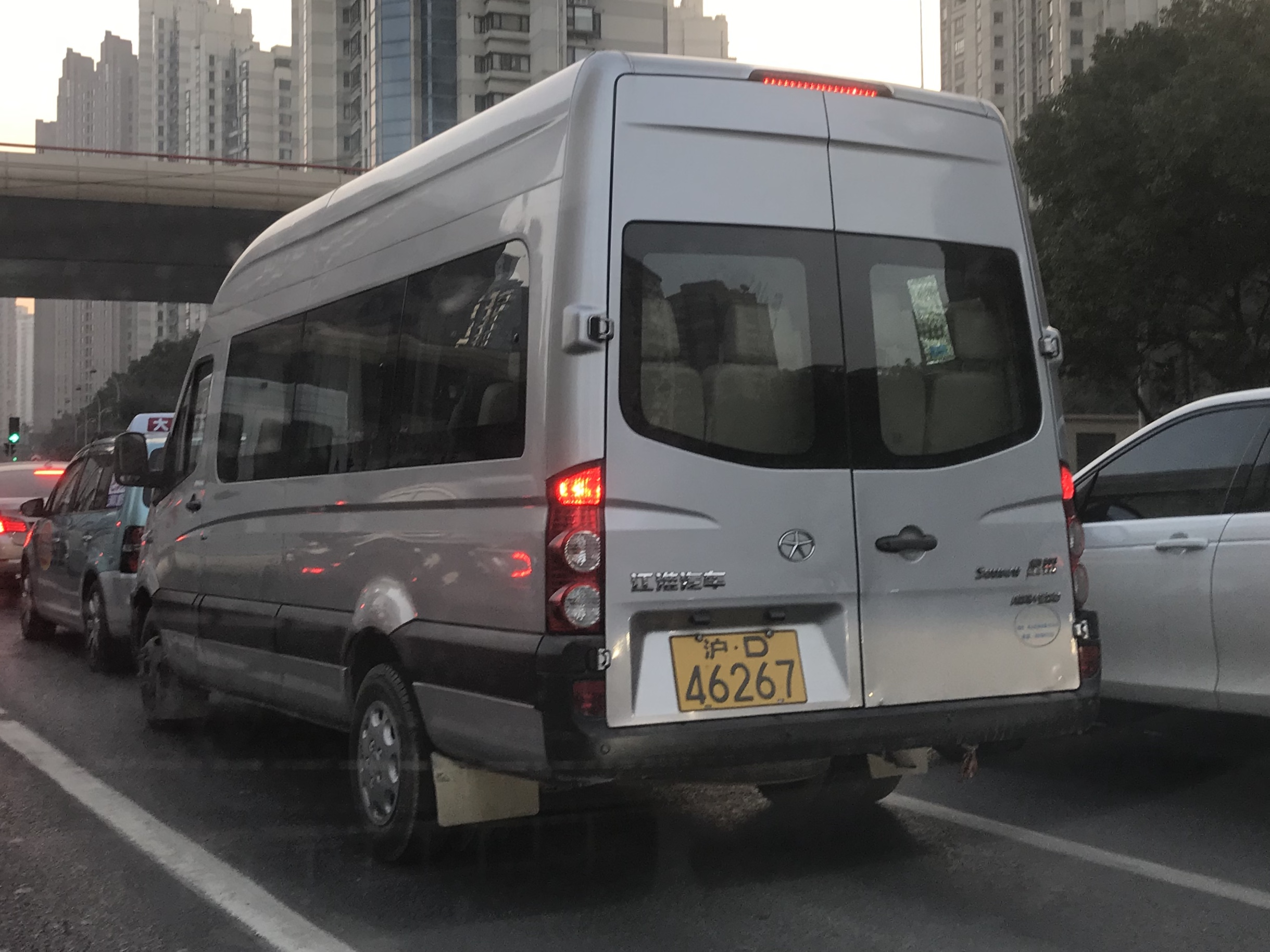
Rear view (LWB)

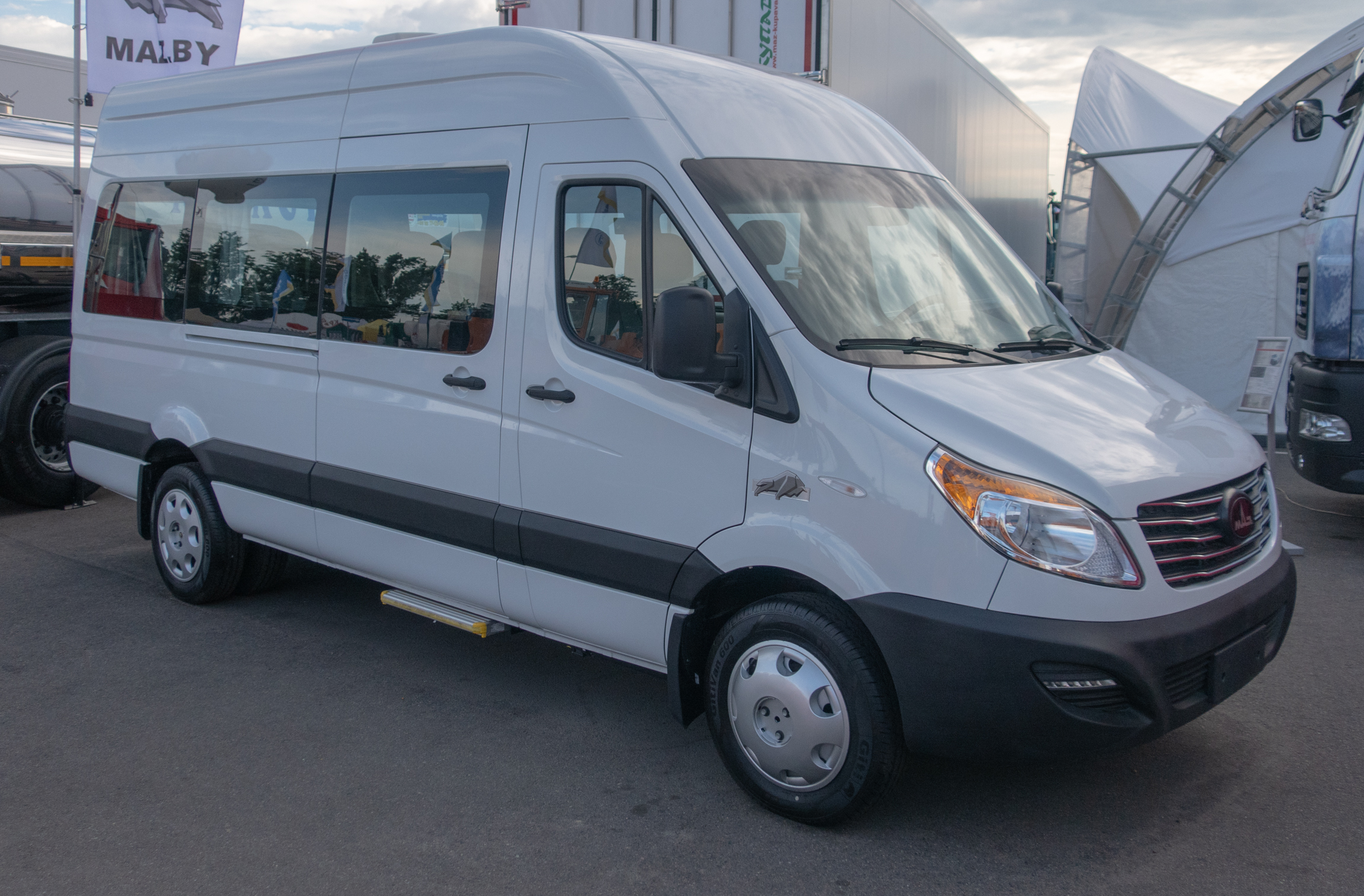
MAZ 281

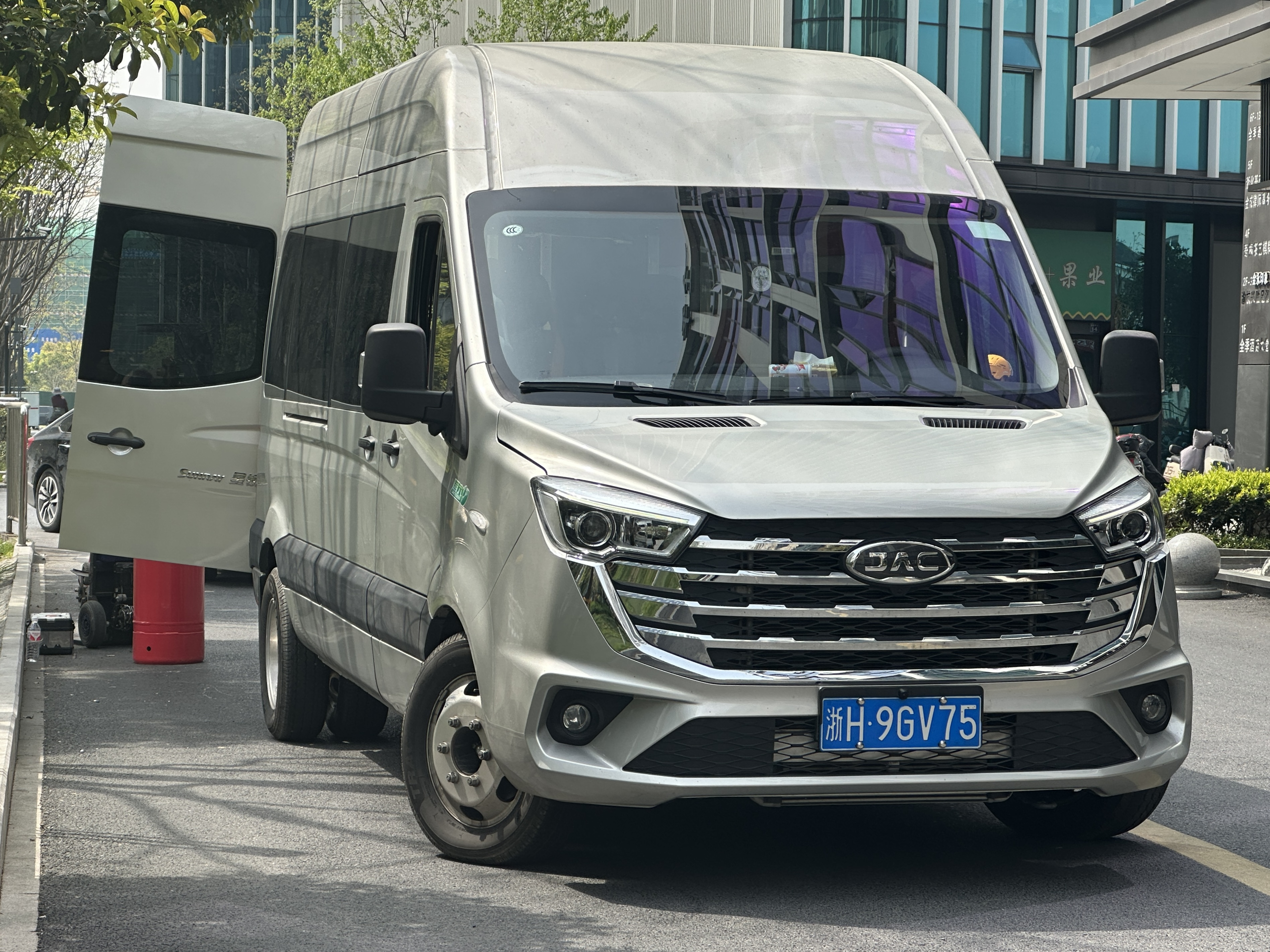
JAC Sunray (facelift)

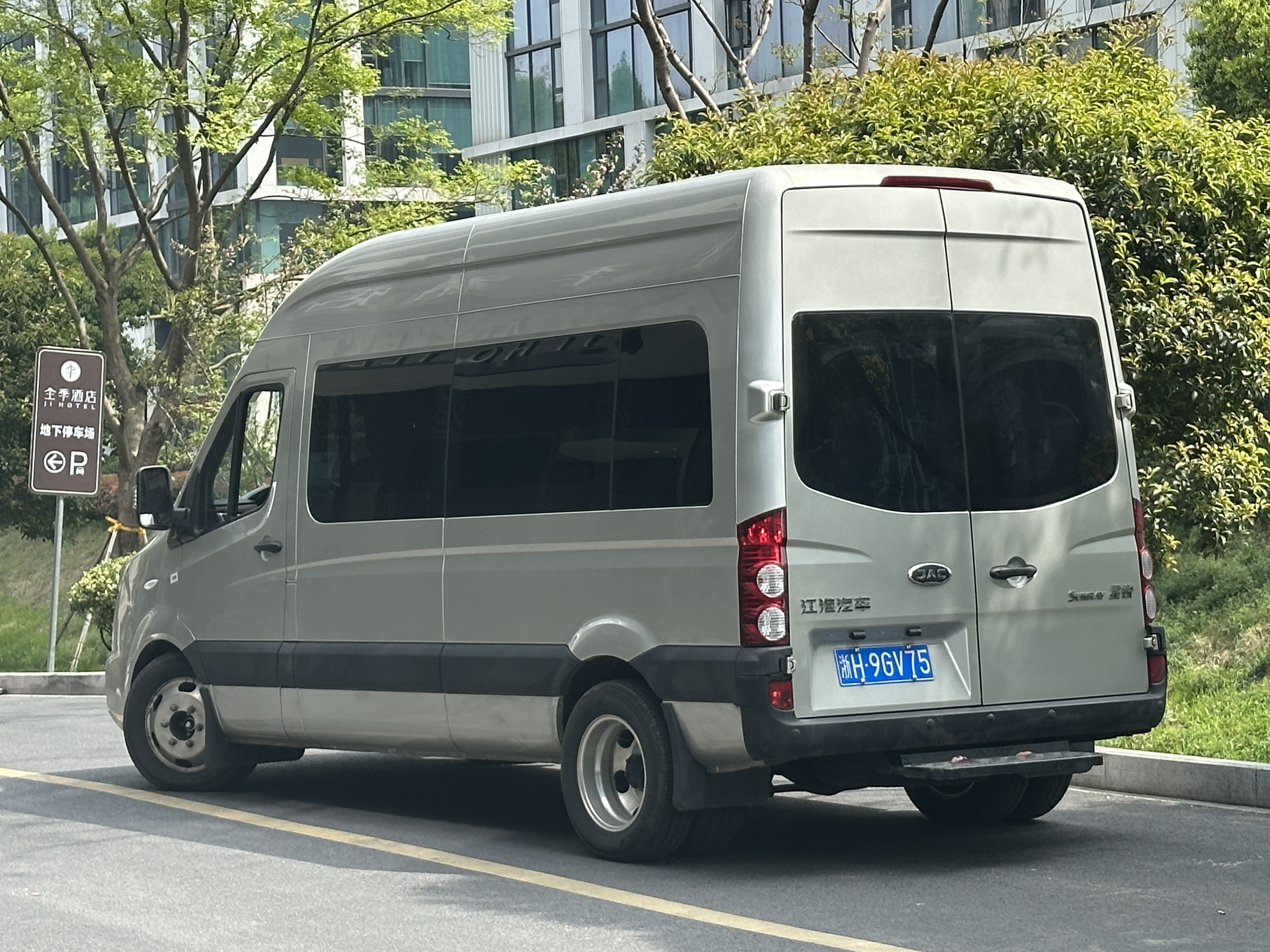
Rear view
