= Ankai =

Chinese automotive manufacturing company

Ankai Automobile
- Type: Public
- Traded as: SZSE: 000868
- Industry: Automotive
- Predecessor: Hefei Feihe Automobile Factory
- Founded: July 22, 1997; 29 years ago
- Headquarters: Hefei, Anhui, China
- Area served: Worldwide
- Products: Buses; Coaches; Automotive components
- Services: Repair and maintenance services
- Revenue: CNY3,727.44 million
- Operating income: CNY87.30 million
- Net income: CNY98.14 million
- Number of employees: Approx. 3,000
- Website: www.ankaiglobal.com

Anhui Ankai Automobile Co., Ltd.
- Simplified Chinese: 安徽安凯汽车股份有限公司
- Traditional Chinese: 安徽安凱汽車股份有限公司
Transcriptions

Ankai Automobile
- Simplified Chinese: 安凯客车
- Traditional Chinese: 安凱客車
Transcriptions

Ankai
- Simplified Chinese: 安凯
- Traditional Chinese: 安凱
Transcriptions

Anhui Ankai Automobile Co., Ltd. is a Chinese automotive manufacturing company headquartered in Hefei, Anhui, which specialises in the production of buses and coaches. Ankai's products include urban buses, regular coaches, sleeping berth coaches, bus and coach chassis and automotive components. Ankai also offers related repair and maintenance services. The company has three principal subsidiaries and distributes its products worldwide.

The name "Ankai" is the abbreviation of Anhui-Kässbohrer, marking the cooperation between Hefei Feihe Automobile Factory and Kässbohrer from 1993.

As of 9 November 2016, Ankai was a constituent of SZSE 1000 Index (as well as sub-index SZSE 700 Index) but not in SZSE Component Index, making the company was ranked between the 501st to 1,000th by free float adjusted market capitalization.

== History ==
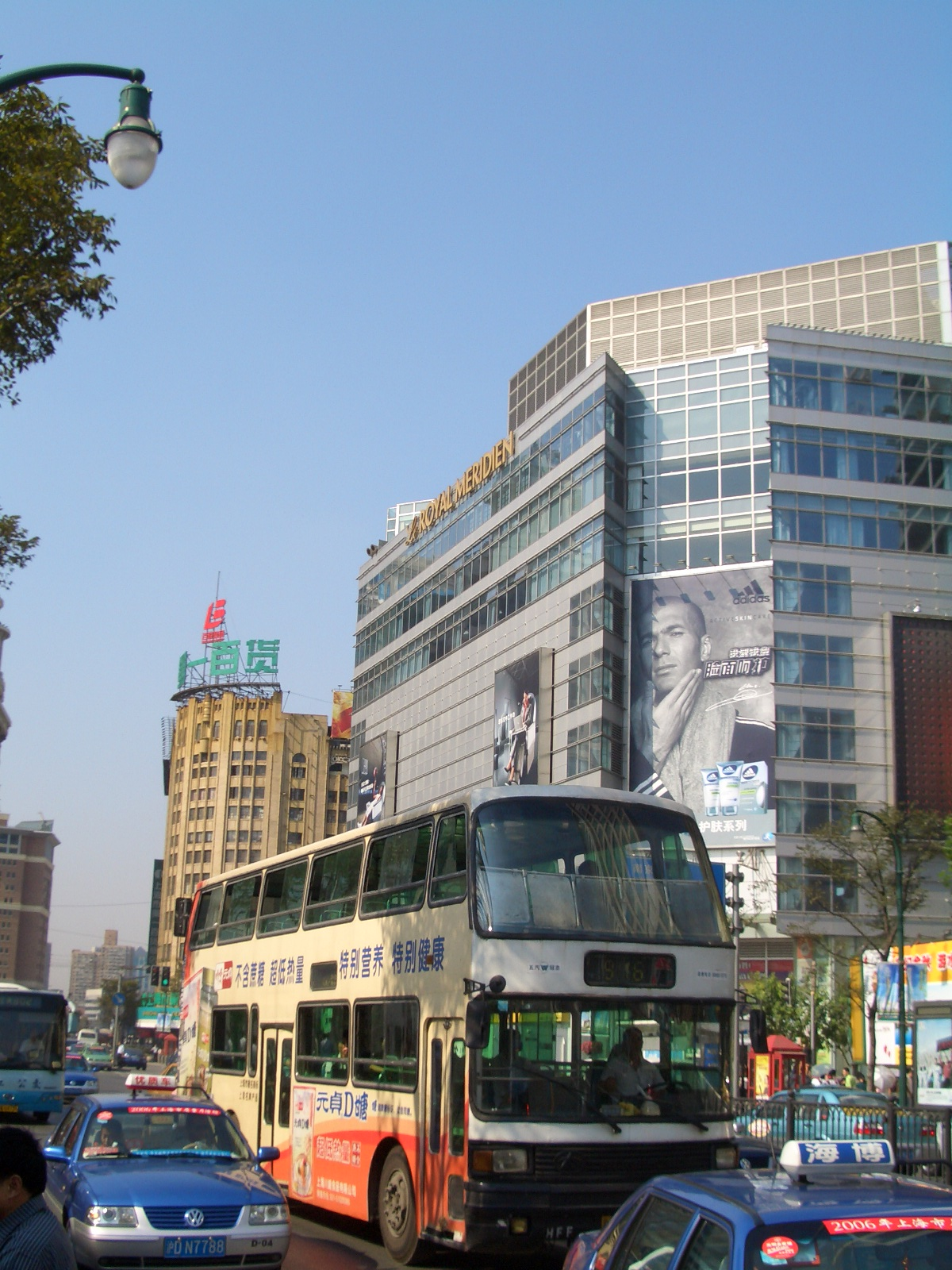
HFF6100SK02 bus produced by Feihe after the introduction of Setra technology

Anhui Ankai Automobile Co., Ltd was founded on July 22, 1997, and was listed on the Shenzhen Stock Exchange, China's second largest stock exchange, three days later. A license agreement for the construction of buses with a self-supporting body was signed with the Setra bus brand, which now belongs to the Daimler subsidiary EvoBus. This made Ankai the first company in Asia to produce this type of body, also known as a monocoque. Just one year later, in November 1998, the 500th bus was manufactured.

In 2001, the license agreement with EvoBus was extended for an additional ten years. The contract permitted Ankai to produce the SETRA S 315 coach model, which won the Coach of the Year award. That same year, construction began on a new automobile factory in Hefei. With an initial production capacity of 1,000 vehicles per year, this facility became the largest production site for comfort buses in China. Licensed production of the S 315, under the name Ankai Setra HFF6120K35(S315), commenced as early as November 2002. In the years that followed, Ankai played a crucial role in developing the nationwide long-distance bus network with modern vehicles that meet Western comfort and safety standards. In September 2002, scheduled bus services from Inner Mongolia to the capital, Beijing, commenced using Ankai-Setra buses. This also marked one of the first fast and comfortable long-distance bus routes in China.

In March 2008, an Ankai bus, the first bus manufactured by a Chinese company, received safety and environmental certification from the Australian Transport Authority. This certificate, which largely aligns with the stringent requirements of the ECE regulations, marked a decisive step in the company's further development. It enabled access to the lucrative European markets, which are heavily regulated concerning technical specifications. Another milestone in the company's history was the sale of 11 Ankai double-decker buses to the Big Bus Company in June 2010. This marked the first time that buses from China entered the US market, following lengthy negotiations with the approval and import authorities. The unit price was RMB 2 million. The buses were painted with oversized USA flags and are used as tourist buses in Las Vegas and San Francisco. In the same year, double-decker buses were sold on the South African market, which had previously been dominated by British models.

In 2022, Ankai partnered with JAC Motors and BYD to build a power battery plant.

== Products ==
- Buses:
  - A5
  - A6
  - A8
  - A9
  - Baositong K7
  - K8
  - F7
  - G7
  - G9
  - N7
- School bus:
  - S6
  - S7
  - S9
- EV buses and vans:
  - G6
  - G7
  - G9
  - A6
  - K7
  - E6
  - E9
  - T3/ Kuaileyun (快乐运)
  - T5

== Gallery ==
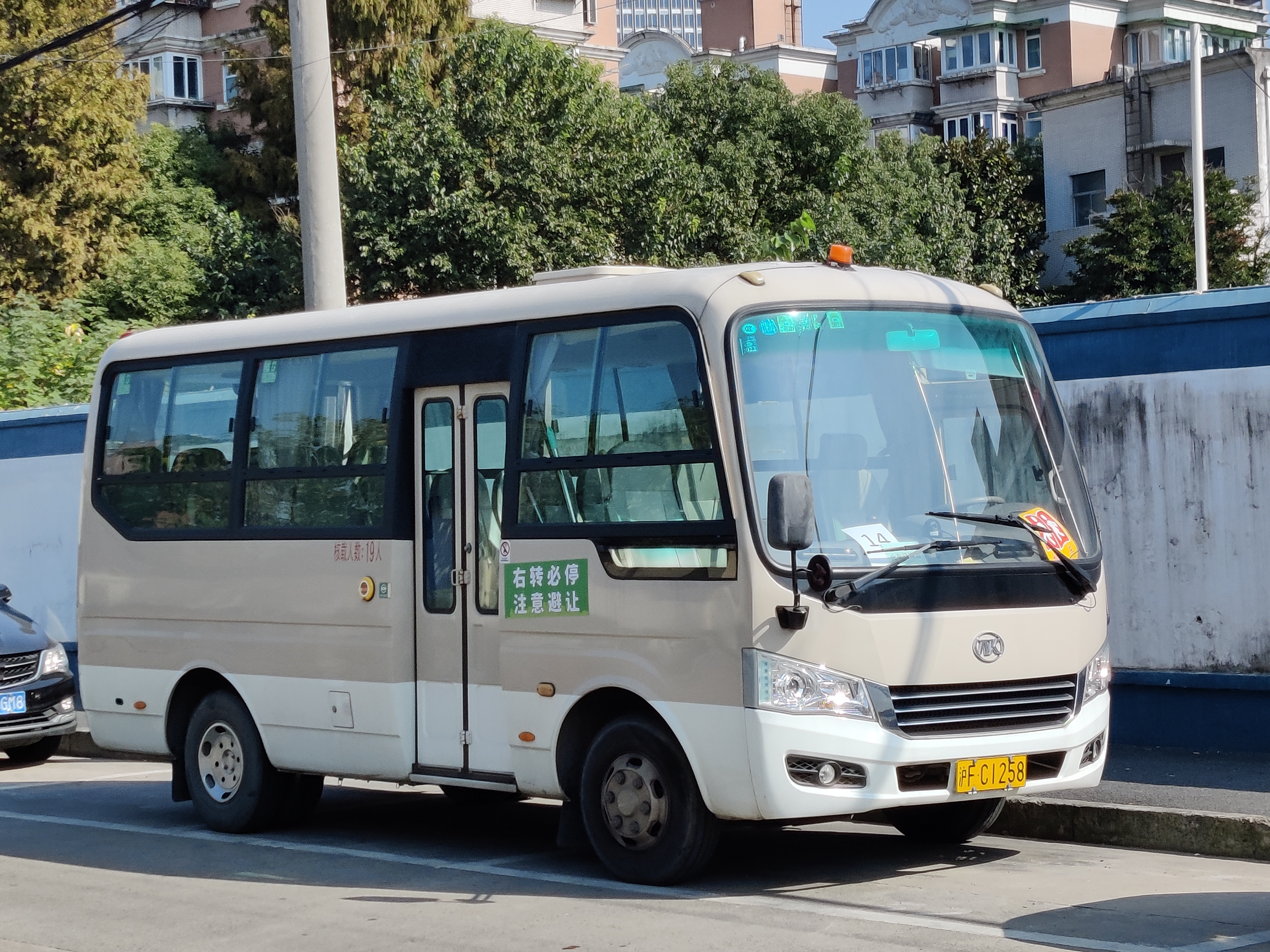
An Ankai HFF6609KDE5FB minibus in Shanghai, China

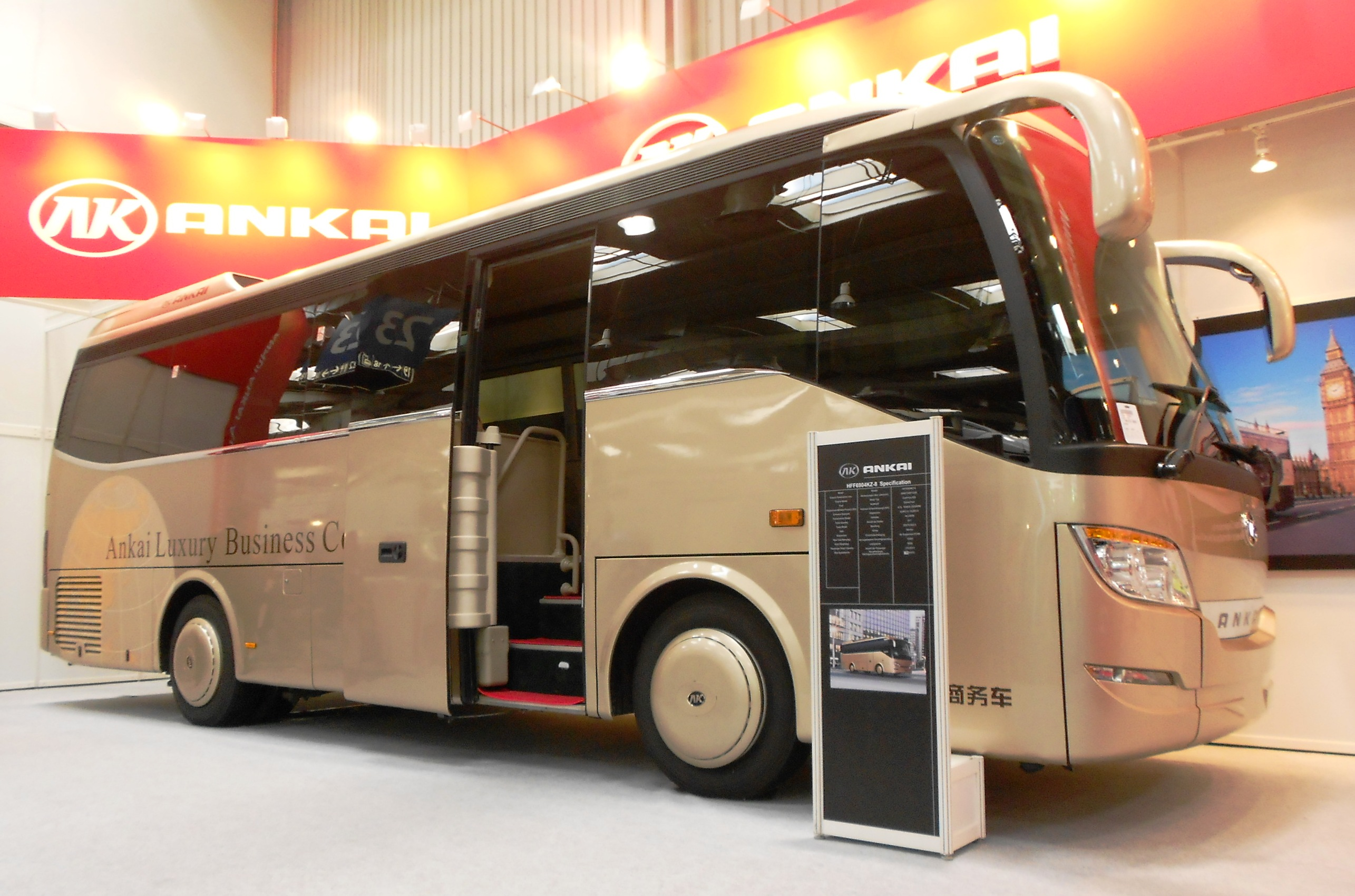
An Ankai HFF 6904KZ 8 coach on display at IAA 2012 in Hannover, Germany

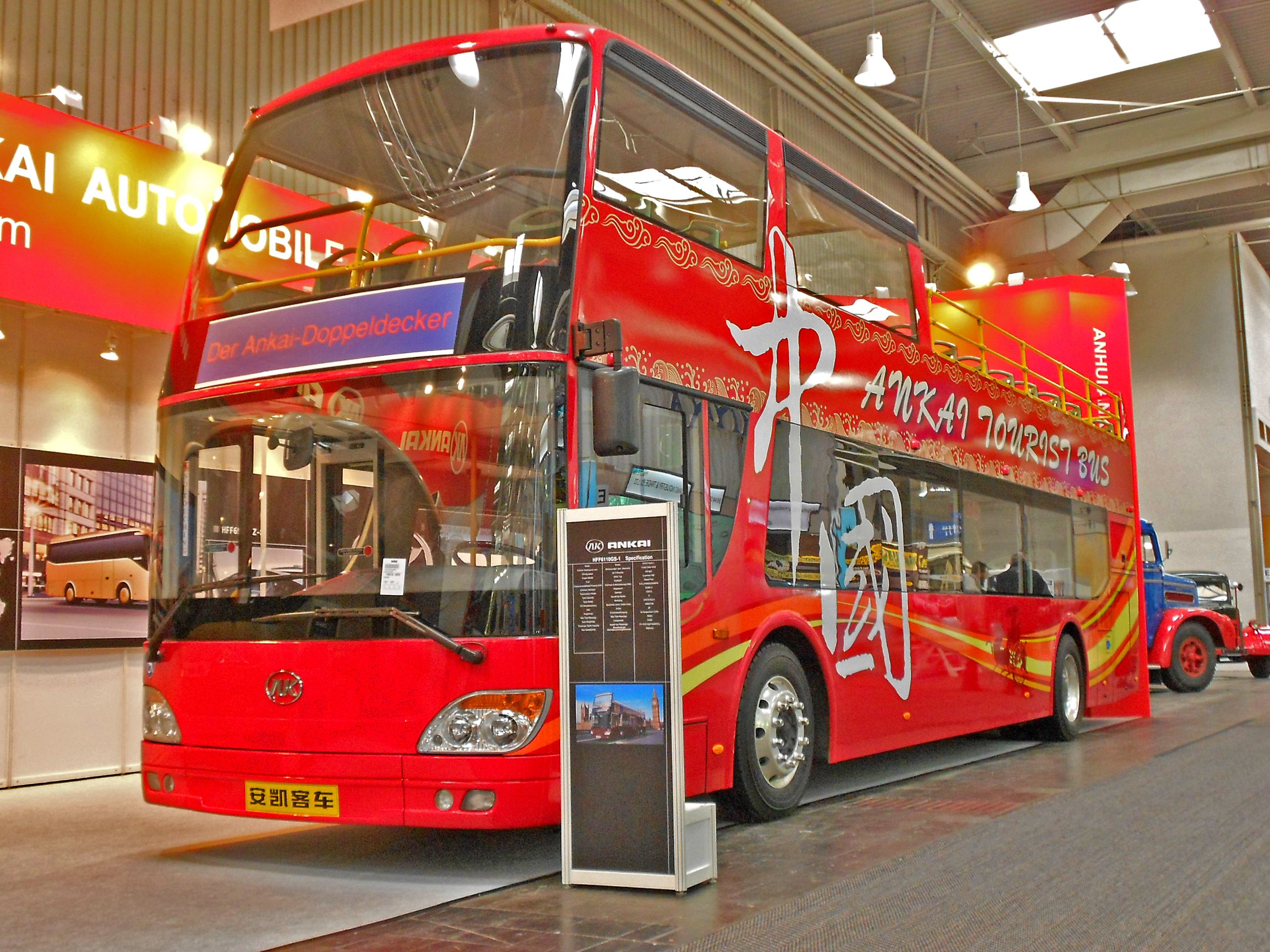
An Ankai HFF 6110GS

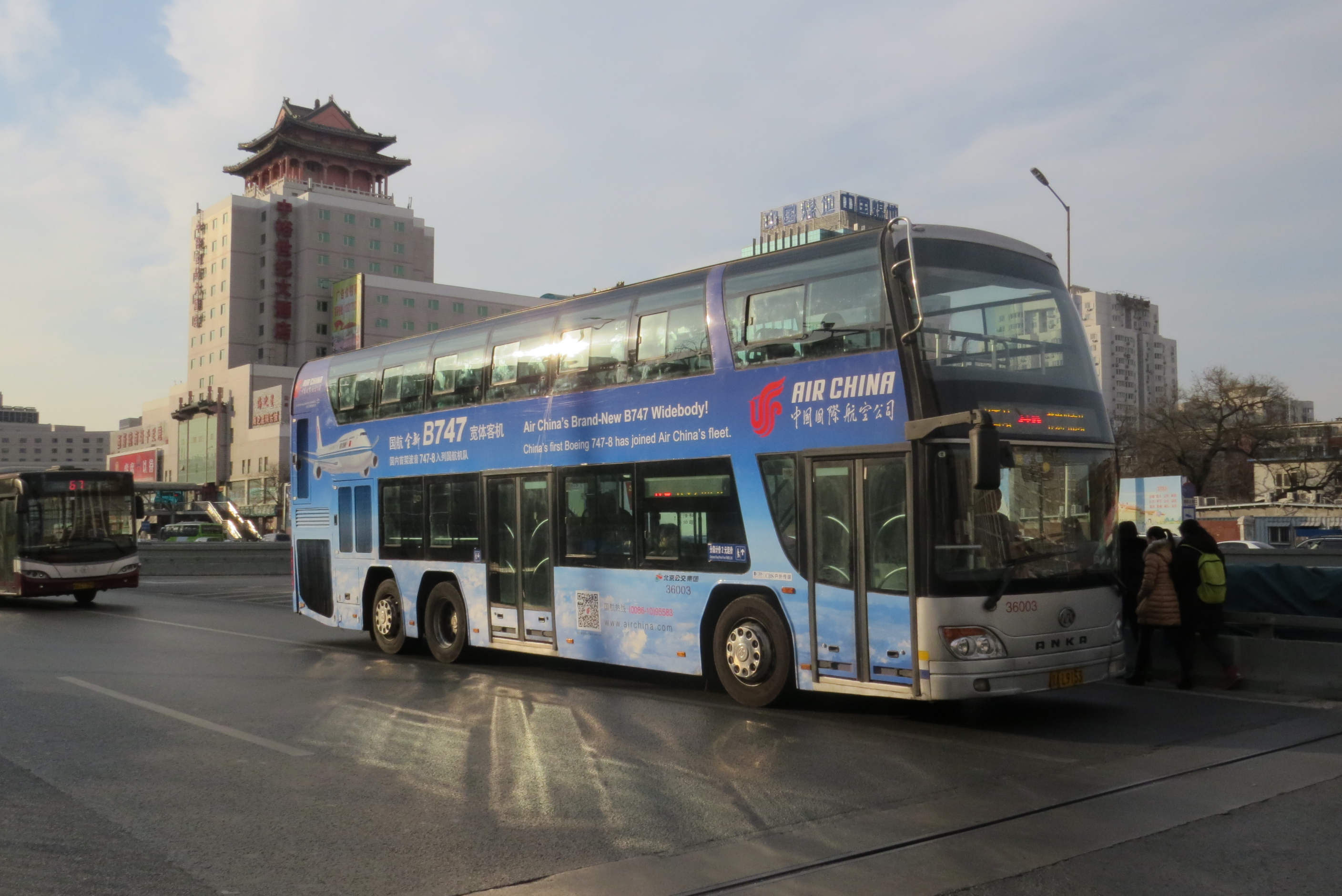
An Ankai HFF 6120GS01C at Beijing West railway station

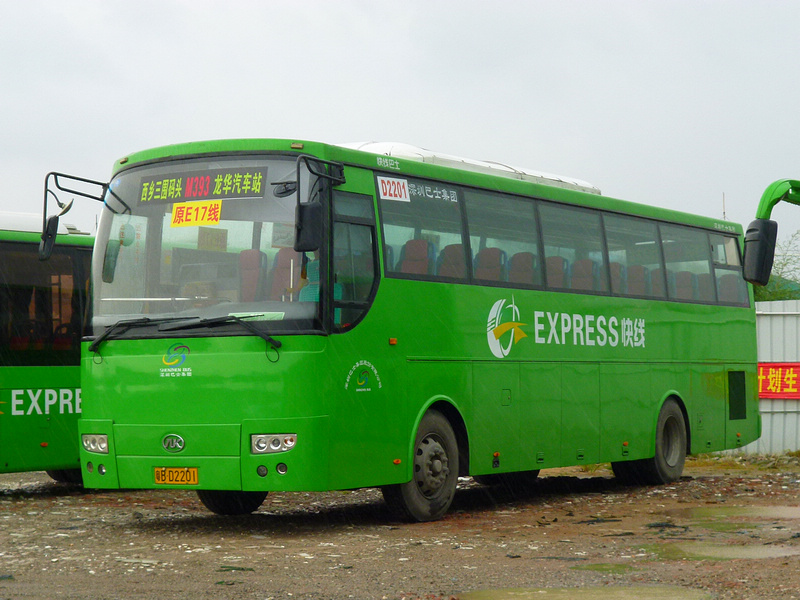
An Ankai bus in service in Shenzhen

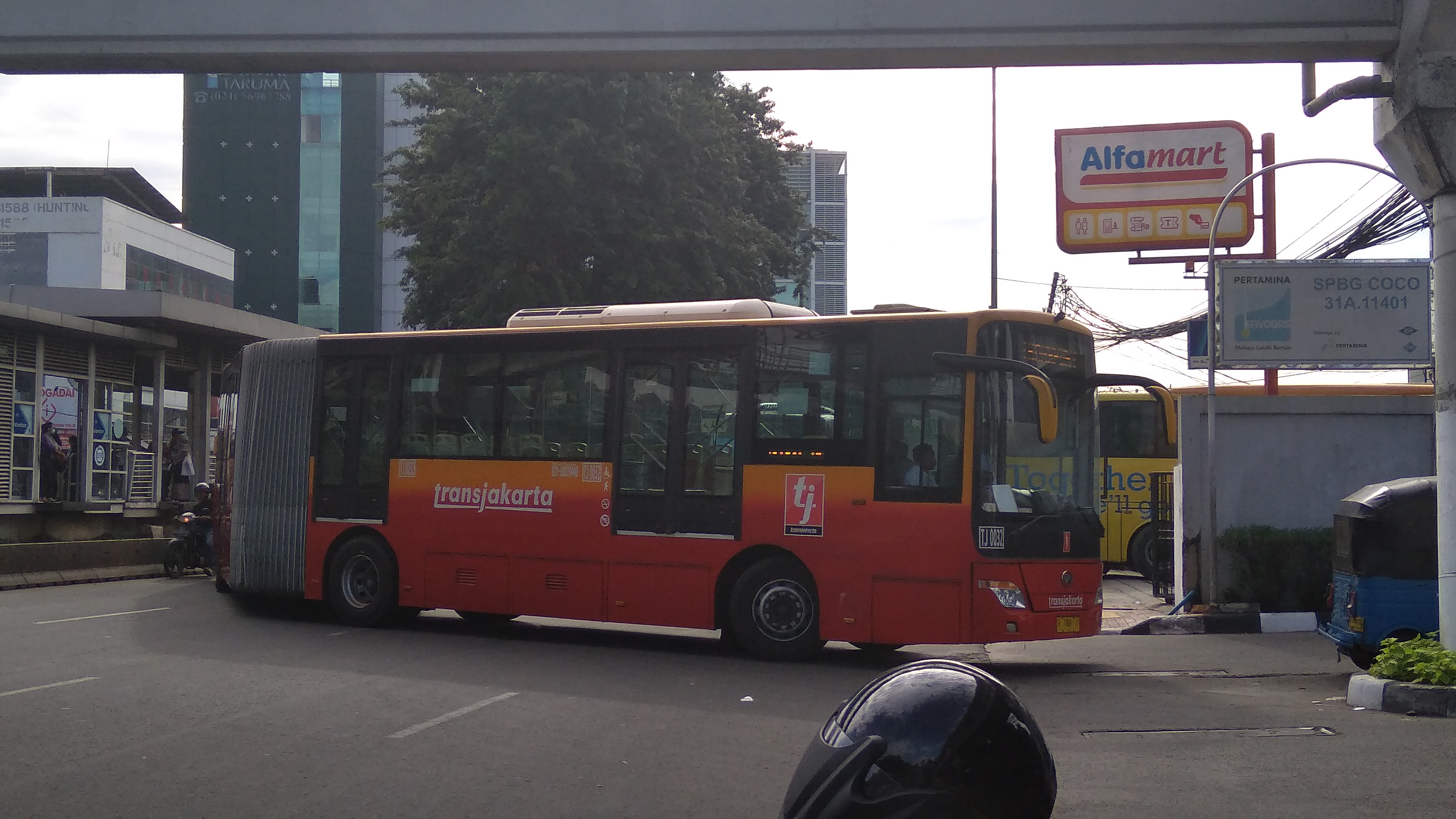
TransJakarta HFF6180G02D bendy bus.

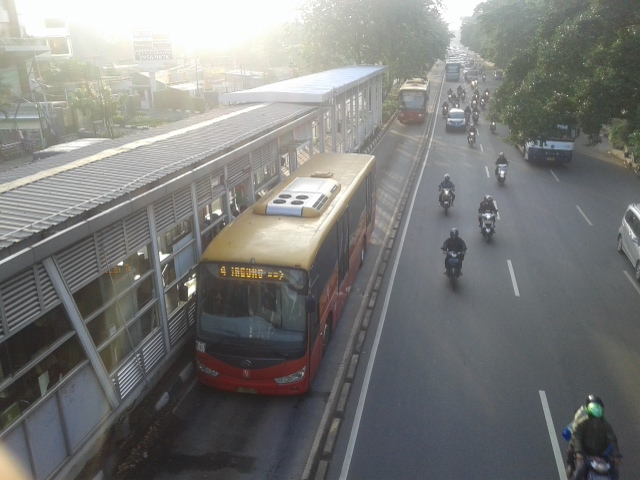
TransJakarta Ankai HFF6120D17D bus with body from New Armada.

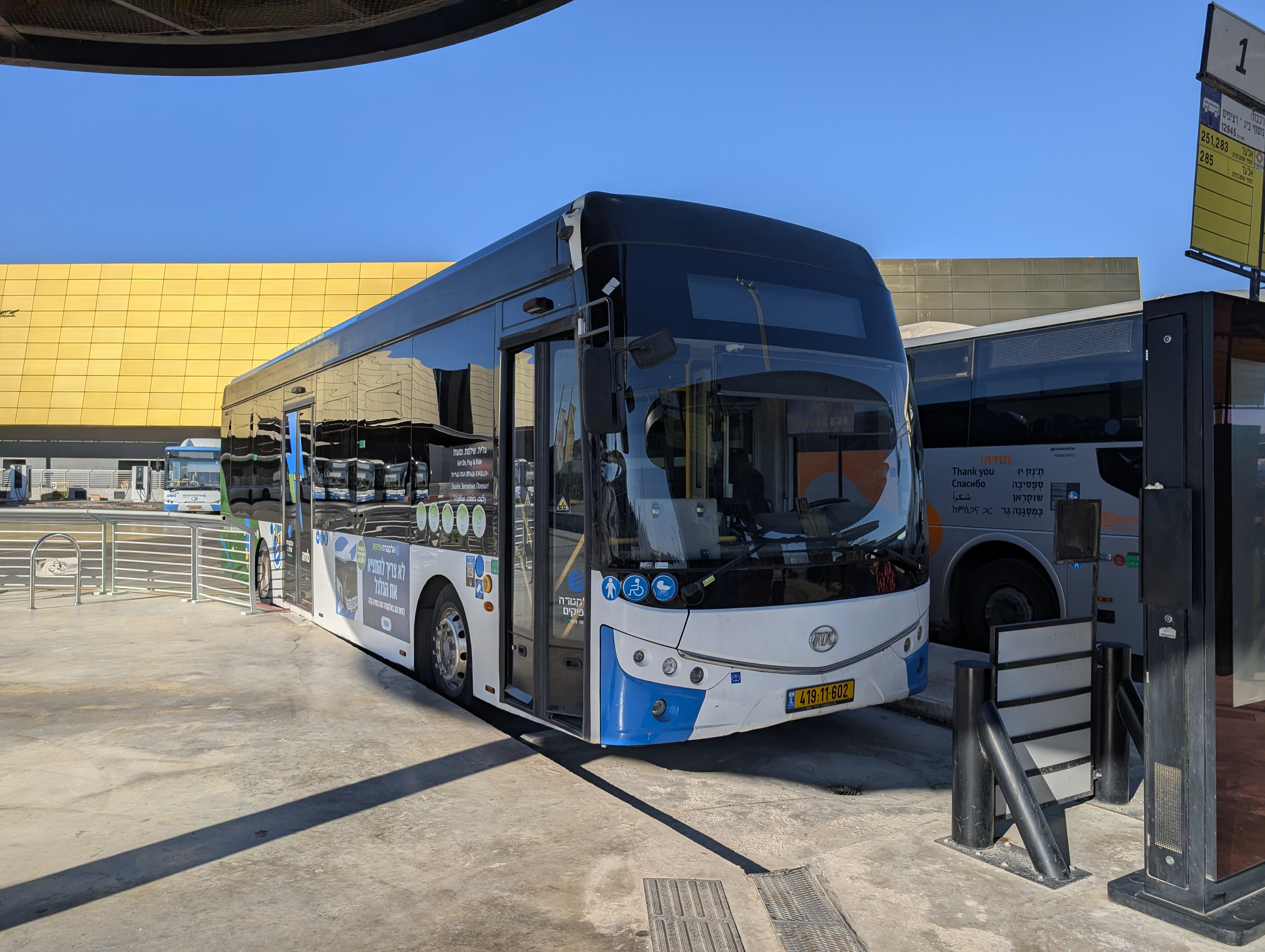
Electric transit bus operated by Electra-Afikim at BIG Terminal, Ashdod, Israel, 2025

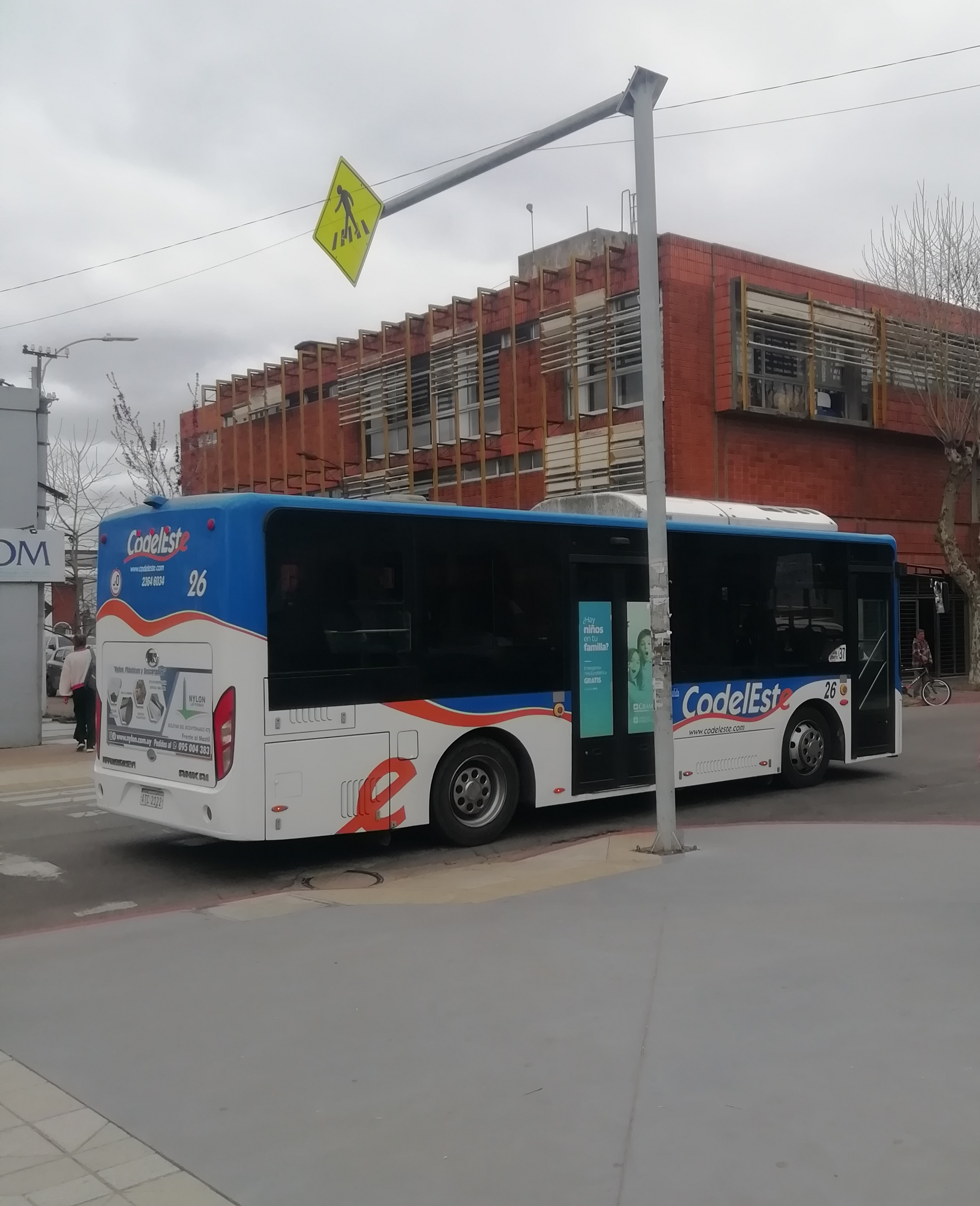
Las Piedras, Uruguay

== See also ==
- Setra
