= List of Maratha rulers =

Chhatrapati of Maratha Empire
- मराठा छत्रपती Marāṭhā Chatrapatī
- Imperial
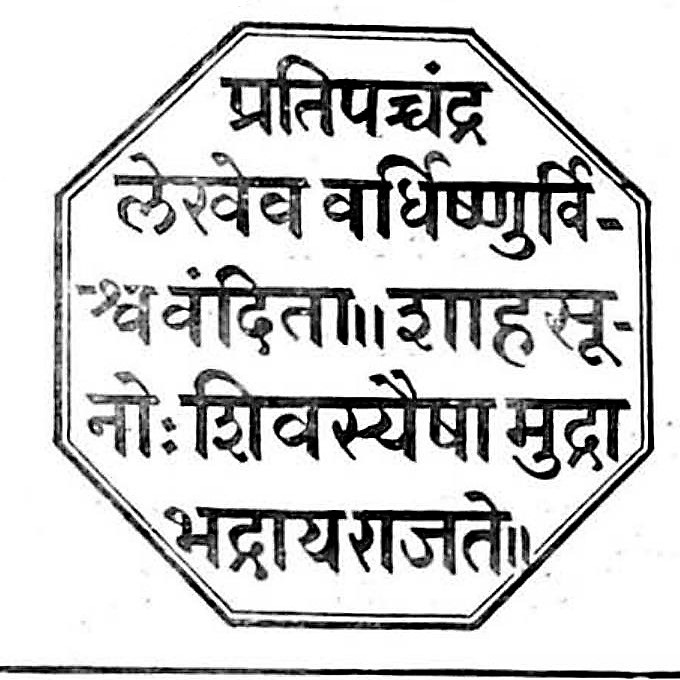
- Imperial seal (Rajmudra)

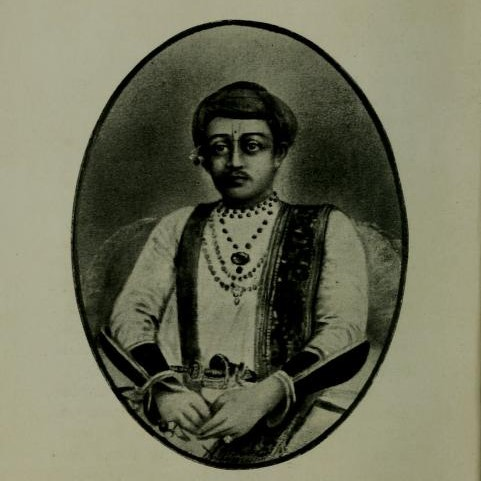
- Last to reign Pratap Singh; 3 May 1808 – 3 June 1818

Details
- Style: His Imperial Majesty (राजे); Kshatriyakulavanta (क्षत्रियकुलवंता); Sinhasanadhishwara (सिंहसनधीश्वर)
- First monarch: Shivaji I
- Last monarch: Pratap Singh
- Formed: 6 June 1674
- Abolished: 3 June 1818
- Residences: Raigad Fort (1674–1708); Ajinkyatara Fort (1708–1818); Gingee Fort (1708–1745; de jure)
- Appointer: Hereditary
- Pretenders: Udayanraje Bhonsale of Satara; Shahu II of Kolhapur

The Chhatrapati was the absolute monarch of the Maratha Empire, from the late 17th century to the early 19th century, on the Indian subcontinent, mainly corresponding to the modern countries of India, Pakistan, Afghanistan and Bangladesh. (Note: Many historians consider Peshawar to be the final frontier of the Maratha Empire) Starting in 1720s, the Peshwas were instrumental in expanding the Maratha Empire to cover large areas of the Indian subcontinent. Peshwas served as subordinates to the Chhatrapati, but later, they became the generals of the Maratha Army, and the Chhatrapati was reduced to a nominal ruler. Their power rapidly dwindled during the 19th century and later Peshwas also were reduced to nominal ruler under various Maratha nobles and later British East India Company. The last Peshwa was deposed in 1818.

== Chhatrapatis ==
=== Shivaji and his early descendants ===
This is the list of the initial Chhatrapatis.

Image	Name	Birth	Reign	Death	Notes
	Shivaji	19 February 1630	6 June 1674 – 3 April 1680	3 April 1680	The founder of the Maratha Kingdom, which eventually grew into the Maratha Empire . He defeated formidable enemies with a small, skilled army using guerrilla warfare. Known as the Father of the Indian Navy, he established a strong Maratha Navy, securing coastal trade routes and defending against foreign invaders like the Portuguese and Siddis. His well-planned sea forts, warships, and strategic naval tactics helped the Marathas dominate the Arabian Sea. He appointed Kanhoji Angre as the Maratha naval chief. His spy network was highly efficient, well-organized, and deeply embedded within enemy territories. He appointed Bahirji Naik as the head of the intelligence department in the army. Backed by a strong spy network and precise intelligence, he strategically planned and executed the swift and successful Sack of Surat. His assassination of the Mughal general Afzal Khan in the Battle of Pratapgad during a parlay was achieved through deception.
	Sambhaji	14 May 1657	16 January 1681 – 11 March 1689	11 March 1689	
	Rajaram	24 February 1670	11 March 1689 – 3 March 1700	3 March 1700	
	Shivaji II (Regent Tarabai)	9 June 1696	March 1700 – 1707, 1710–2 August 1714 (Kolhapur State)	14 March 1726	
	Shahu	18 May 1682	12 January 1708 – 15 December 1749	15 December 1749	
	Pratap Singh	18 January 1793	3 May 1808 – 3 June 1818	14 October 1847	

=== Chhatrapatis of Satara ===
This is the list of the Chhatrapatis of Satara.

Image	Name	Birth	Reign	Death	Notes
	Shahu I	18 May 1682	12 January 1708 – 15 December 1749	15 December 1749	
	Rajaram II	June 1726	15 December 1749 – 11 December 1777	11 December 1777	
	Shahu II	1763	11 December 1777 – 3 May 1808	3 May 1808	
	Pratapsingh	18 January 1793	3 June 1818 – 5 September 1839	14 October 1847	
	Shahaji	1802	5 September 1839 – 5 April 1848	5 April 1848	

=== Chhatrapatis of Kolhapur ===
This is the list of the Chhatrapatis of Kolhapur.

Image	Name	Birth	Reign	Death	Notes
	Shivaji II	9 June 1696	1700–1707, 1710–1714 (Kolhapur State)	14 March 1726	
	Sambhaji II	1698	1714–1760	18 December 1760	
	Shivaji III	1756	22 September 1762 – 24 April 1813	24 April 1813	
	Sambhaji III	1801	24 April 1813 – 2 July 1821	2 July 1821	
	Shivaji IV	1816	July 2, 1821 – Jan 03 1822	January 3, 1822	
	Shahaji I	22 January 1802	3 January 1822 – 29 November 1838	29 November 1838	
	Shivaji V	26 December 1830	1838–1866	4 August 1866	
	Rajaram II	April 13, 1850	August 18, 1866 – November 30, 1870	November 30, 1870	
	Shivaji VI	April 5, 1863	1871–1883	December 25, 1883	
	Shahu IV (overall); Shahu I of Kolhapur	26 June 1874	2 April 1894 – 6 May 1922	6 May 1922	
	Rajaram III	31 July 1897	1922–1940	26 November 1940	
	Shivaji VII	22 November 1941	31 December 1941 – 28 September 1946	28 September 1946	
	Shahaji II	4 April 1910	1947–1971	9 May 1983	

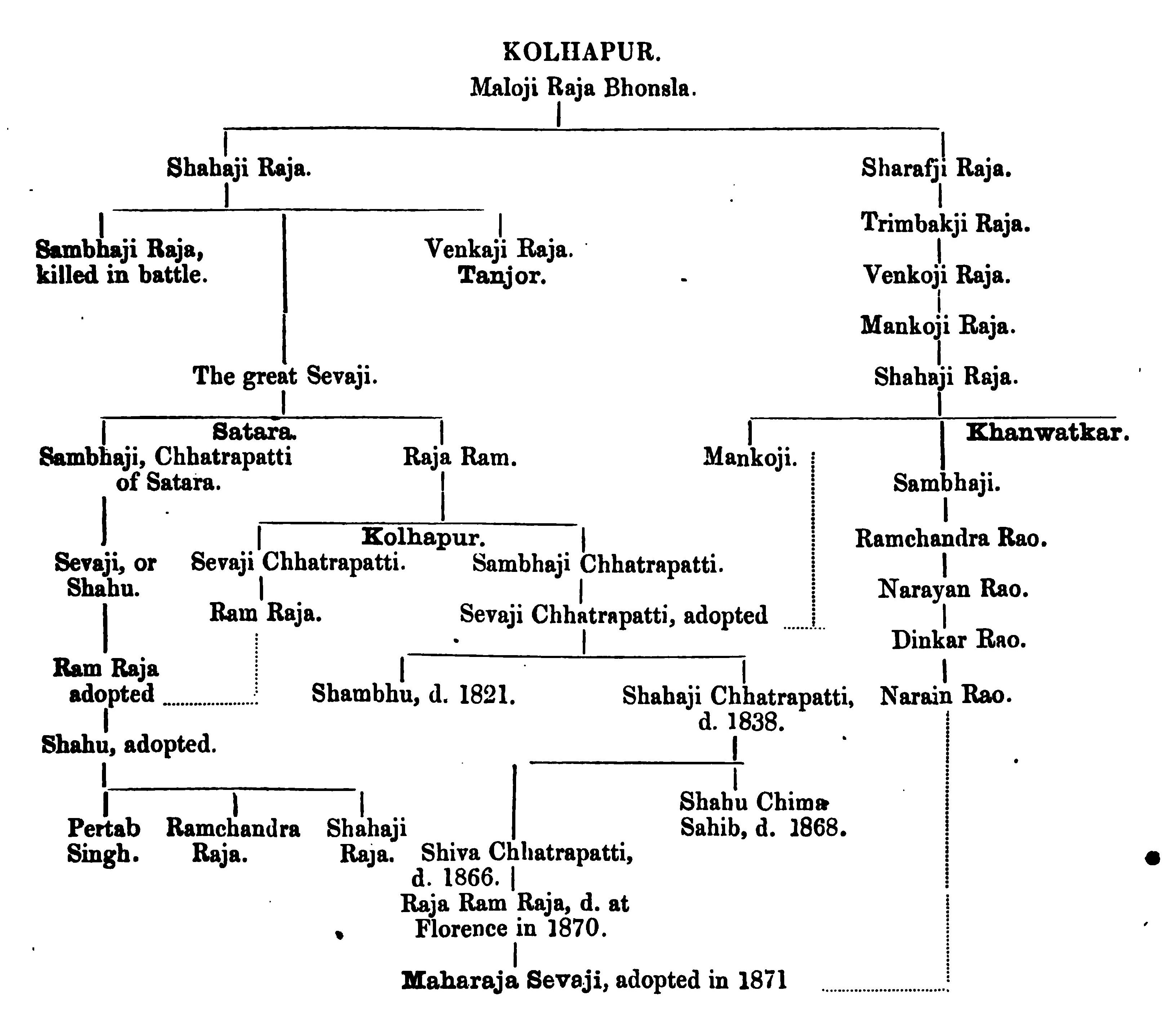
Genealogy of Kolhapur Chhatrapatis

== Peshwas (Prime Minister) ==
=== Early Peshwas ===
Image	Name	Birth	Reign	Death	Notes
	Moropant Trimbak Pingle	1620	1674–1683	1683	
	Nilakanth Moreshvar Pingale		1683–1689	1689	
	Ramchandra Pant Amatya	1650	1689–1708	1716	
1708–1711	Bahirojipant Pingale				
	Parshuram Trimbak Kulkarni	1660	1711–1713	1718	

=== Peshwas (Bhat family) ===
Image	Name	Birth	Reign	Death	Notes
	Balaji Vishwanath (Sixth appointed Peshwa)	1 January 1662	16 November 1713 – 12 April 1720	12 April 1720	Assisted the Syed Brothers in deposing the Mughal Emperor Farrukhsiyar in 1719
	Baji Rao I (Seventh appointed Peshwa)	18 August 1700	17 April 1720 – 28 April 1740	28 April 1740	Known as Thorle (elder) Bajirao and acknowledged as the most influential of the nine Peshwas. Said to have fought for the establishment of "Hindu Pad Padshahi"(Hindu Empire). Helped conquer Central India (Malwa) and Rajputana and extended his dominions into Gujarat in the northwest and Deccan in the south. Attacked Delhi in 1737. Fought in over 41 battles and is one of the few to have never lost a single battle. Died at the age of 40 of sudden fever in camp en route to Delhi; he has been commemorated in the form of an equestrian statue erected at Shaniwar Wada in Pune.
	Balaji Bajirao (Eighth appointed Peshwa)	8 December 1720	August 1740 – 23 June 1761	23 June 1761	Known as Nanasaheb Peshwa. Managed to extend the Maratha territories into most of North-West, East and Central India. Captured Attock on the banks of the Indus River and Peshawar in 1758 in the Battle of Attock, 1758. Under his leadership, the Maratha Empire reached its peak but his general and cousin lost the Third Battle of Panipat against Ahmad Shah Abdali in 1761. Contributed to the development of the city of Pune which was the seat of the Peshwas. Built the famous Parvati Temple, Lakdi Pool and established Nana Peth (area) in Pune. Built a water reservoir near Katraj to provide clean water to Pune city; this 250-year-old system is still functioning.
	Madhavrao I (First hereditary Peshwa)	15 February 1745	23 June 1761 – 18 November 1772	18 November 1772	Fraught with internal dissensions and successful Wars with the Nizam. During his tenure, Maratha power recovered from the losses suffered during the Third Battle of Panipat, a phenomenon known as Maratha Resurrection. Repaired the recently weakened administration, treasury, and accounts of the Maratha Empire. He died of tuberculosis in 1772; a memorial commemorating his greatness stands at Peshwe Park in Pune. One of the theory says that he was assassinated by her aunt, Anandi Bai (wife of Raghunath Rao).
	Narayan Rao	10 August 1755	13 December 1772 – 30 August 1773	30 August 1773	Assassinated by Gardi guards. Raghunath Rao was in favor of just kidnapping him and accordingly he used the code "DHARA". But Anandi Bai (wife of Raghunath Rao) changed the code to "MAARA". Narayan Rao was assassinated in Shanivar Wada. Nowadays, it is considered one of the haunted place in Maharashtra.
	Raghunathrao	18 August 1734	5 December 1773 – 28 May 1774	11 December 1783	Responsible for extending the Maratha empire to the zenith in the North as a General and also saw the decline of Maratha power in North India. Deposed by Nana Phadnis and 11 other administrators in what is now called "The Baarbhai Conspiracy"
	Madhavrao II	18 April 1774	28 May 1774 – 27 October 1795	27 October 1795	Appointed Peshwa as an infant with a council of Maratha Generals and ministers as regents. Era dominated by the political intrigues of Nana Phadnis. Saw the resurgence of Maratha power in North India.
	Baji Rao II	10 January 1775	6 December 1796 – 25 October 1802	28 January 1851	1st Reign – Was defeated by Yashwantrao Holkar, ruler of Indore, at the Battle of Poona. Fled to British protection, and in December 1802, concluded the Treaty of Bassein with the British East India Company, ceding territory for the maintenance of a subsidiary force and agreeing to treaty with no other power. This provoked the Second Anglo-Maratha War that began the breakup of the Maratha confederacy.
	Amrut Rao (Appointed as Peshwa by Yashwantrao Holkar)	c. 1770	25 October 1802 – 13 May 1803	6 September 1824	Appointed Peshwa by Yashwantrao Holkar after defeating Baji Rao II and Daulat Rao Sindhia in Battle of Poona.
	Baji Rao II	10 January 1775	13 May 1803 – 3 June 1818	28 January 1851	2nd Reign – During his second reign began the Third Anglo-Maratha War. After the defeat at the Battle of Koregaon in January 1818, he was on the run from the British. Eventually, the British took over his dominion and made the Maratha King Pratap Singh of Satara declare in favour of the British. This ended the Peshwa's legal position as head of the Maratha confederacy. On 3 June 1818, Baji Rao surrendered to the British; he was banished to Bithur near Kanpur.
	Nana Sahib (Pretender of the position of the Peshwa)	19 May 1824	1 February 1851 – 30 June 1857 (unrecognized)	after 1857	Was a leader during the Indian Uprising of 1857. As the adopted son of the exiled Maratha Peshwa Baji Rao II, he sought to restore the Maratha confederacy and the Peshwa tradition.
