= Bhonsle dynasty =

Indian Marathi house

Bhonsle
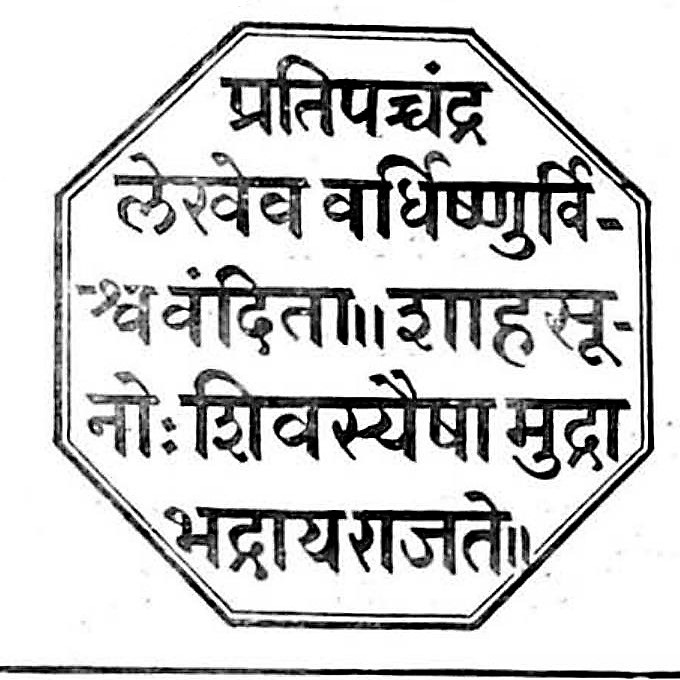
- Rajmudra (royal seal) of Shivaji I

- Bhagwa Dhwaj, the flag of the Maratha Empire
- Parent house: Sisodia dynasty (claimed)
- Country: Maratha Empire (1674–1818); Sawantwadi State (1729–1947); Thanjavur State (1674–1855); Kolhapur State (1710–1947); Nagpur State (1739–1853); Satara State (1818–1849); Akkalkot State (1840–1947)
- Origin: Verul, Maharashtra, India
- Founded: 1577; 449 years ago
- Founder: Maloji Bhosale
- Current head: Udayanraje Bhosale (Satara branch); Shahu II (Kolhapur branch); Khem Sawant VI Bhonsle Bahadur (Sawantwadi branch); Sumitrabai Raje Bhonsle (Akkalkot branch); Shivaji Rajah Bhosle (Thanjavur branch); Raje Mudhoji Bhosale III (Nagpur branch)
- Titles: List: Chhatrapati of the Maratha Empire; Raja of Sawantwadi (1729-1947); Raja of Thanjavur (1674-1855); Raja of Kolhapur (1710-1947); Raja of Nagpur (1739-1853); Raja of Satara (1818-1849); Raja of Akkalkot (1840-1947); Raja of Verul, Derhadi and Kannarad (1595 or 1599 - 1608 or 1620); Jagirdar of Supa (1599 - 1664); Jagirdar of Pune (1599 - 1664); Jagirdar of Bangalore (1538 - 1664); Patil of Hingni Berdi and Devalgaon
- Motto: हर हर महादेव "Har Har Mahadev" ("Praises to Mahadev (Shiva)")
- Estates: List: Jalmandir Palace, Satara (1838-present); Raigad Fort, Maratha Empire (1656–1689; 1707–1818); Gingee Fort, Maratha Empire (1677-1698); Ajinkyatara Fort, Maratha Empire (1706-1818); Red Fort, Maratha Empire (1771-1803); Nagardhan Fort, Nagpur (1740-1853); Senior Bhonsle Palace, Nagpur (1861-present); Aranmanai Palace, Thanjavur (1674-present); New Palace, Kolhapur (1877-present)
- Deposition: List: Maratha Empire; 1713: Chatrapati Shahu I becomes a puppet of the Peshwas (Bhat Family); 1818: Third Anglo-Maratha War leads to British East Indian Company control of Maratha territory and the creation of Satara State under British suzerainty; Bhonsle States; 1849: annexation of the Satara State by the East India Company; 1853: annexation of the Nagpur State by the East India Company; 1855: annexation of the Thanjavur State by the East India Company; 1947: annexation of the Akkalkot State by the Dominion of India; 1947: annexation of the Sawantwadi State by the Dominion of India; 1949: annexation of the Kolhapur State by the Dominion of India
- Cadet branches: Bhonsles of Nagpur; Bhonsles of Sawantwadi; Bhonsles of Satara; Bhonsles of Kolhapur; Bhonsles of Akkalkot; Bhonsles of Thanjavur

The Bhonsle dynasty (or Bhonsale, Bhosale, Bhosle) is an Indian Marathi royal house of the Bhonsle clan. The Bhonsles claimed descent from the Rajput Sisodia dynasty, but were likely Kunbi Marathas.

They served as the Chhatrapatis or kings of the Maratha Empire from 1674 to 1818, where they gained dominance of the Indian subcontinent. They also ruled several states such as Satara, Kolhapur, Thanjavur, Nagpur, Akkalkot, Sawantwadi and Barshi.

The dynasty was founded in 1577 by Maloji Bhosale, a predominant general or sardar of Malik Ambar of the Ahmadnagar Sultanate. In 1595 or 1599, Maloji was given the title of Raja by Bahadur Nizam Shah, the ruler of the Ahmadnagar Sultanate. He was later granted was given the jagir of Pune, Elur (Verul), Derhadi, Kannarad and Supe. He was also given control over the first of the Shivneri and Chakan. These positions were inherited by his sons Shahaji and Sharifji, who were named after a Muslim Sufi Shah Sharif.

== Origins ==
The origins of the Bhonsles in unclear. According to Jadunath Sarkar and other scholars, Bhonsles were predominantly Deccani tiller-plainsmen from the Shudra caste; they were part of the Marathas/Kunbis, an amorphous class-group. (Note: Susan Bayly and Eraly however emphasize that the Marathas were located outside the peripheries of Brahminism and people thereof did not form any rigid caste.) Scholars have however disagreed about the agricultural status of Bhosles. Rosalind O'Hanlon notes that the historical evolution of castes grouped under the Maratha-Kunbis is sketchy. Ananya Vajpeyi rejects the designation of Shudra, since the category has remained in a state of flux across centuries; she instead notes them to be a Marathi lineage, who enjoyed "reasonably high" social status as landholders and warlords, being in the service of Deccan Sultanate or Mughals. (Note: Vajpeyi however notes that the Bhonsles almost-certainly never featured in the traditional list of 96 families, which allegedly composed the Maratha identity.)

According to R. C. Dhere's interpretation of local oral history and ethnography, Bhonsles descend from the Hoysalas and Yadavas of Devagiri, who were cow-herding Gavli sovereigns. (Note: This was published in "Sikhar Singanapurca Sri Sambhu Mahadev" (2002) for the first time.) (Note: The caste-status of these Yadavas and whether they were a part of Bahminical hiearchy is disputed.) In early thirteenth century, "Baliyeppa Gopati Sirsat", a Hoysala cousin of Simhana migrated from Gadag to Satara along with his pastoral herd and kul-devta; the Sambhu Mahadev was thus installed at a hill-top in Singhnapur. (Note: The Hoysalas as well as the Yadavas were competing feudatories of the Chalukyas with battles being as much common as matrimonial alliances. The migration was prob. motivated by pervasive droughts in the region and an opportunity to seek out some independence for himself.) (Note: The shrine continues to serve as one of the most significant Shaivite shrine in modern Maharashtra.) Historical records indicate that this shrine received extensive patronage from Maloji onwards. (Note: Texts produced under patronage of Shahaji make explicit connection between the Bhosales and Balip. Also, the "samadhi" (memorial) of Sambhaji, Shivaji, and Shahuji neighbor the shrine. However, for a span of about 250 years — from Balip to Kheloji — the history of the shrine is not clear.) Further, there exists a branch of the Bhosles named "Sirsat Bhosles" and Bhosle (or "Bhosale") is linguistically similar to "Hoysala". M. K. Dhavalikar found the work to convincingly explain the foundation of the Bhosle clan (as well as Sambhu Mahadev cult). Vajpeyi too advocates that Dhere's theory be probed in greater detail — "[f]rom pastoralist big men to warlords on horseback, is not an impossible distance to cover in two to three centuries."

=== Accuracy ===
Vajpeyi notes the "veridical status" of Chitnis' finds to be not determinable to "historical certainty" — the links were tenuous at best and inventive at worst. Shivaji was not a Rajput and the sole purpose of the lineage was to guarantee Shivaji's consecration as a Kshatriya, in a tactic that had clear parallels to Rajputisation. (Note: She however cautions that the summary rejection of Shivaji's ancestry claims in contemporary historiographical literature often stemmed from a Brahminical anti-Maratha perspective, imbibed from the Peshwas.) Jadunath Sarkar deemed that the genealogy was cleverly fabricated by Balaji Awji and after some reluctance accepted by Gaga Bhatt, who in turn was "rewarded with a huge fee". V. K. Rajwade, Dhere, Allison Busch, John Keay and Audrey Truschke also agree with Sarkar about the fabrication. G. S. Sardesai notes that the descent is "not authentically proved". (Note: Sardesai noted that the claims were supported by some 'firman's in possession of the Raja of Mudhol but many scholars [unidentified] considered them to be forged.) Stewart N. Gordon does not pass any judgement but notes Bhatt to be a "creative Brahmin". (Note: Gordon however points out that Shivaji might have "thought of himself as a Rajput" since long back. He evidences a letter (1656) sent by Shahji to Adil Shah II where they had boasted of Rajput pride and another letter (18 July 1666) from Parkaldas (an officer under Jai Singh) to Kalyandas, where three Rajput chieftains are noted to be admiring of Shivaji as a great Rajput with all the "characteristic qualities." Vajpeyi interprets the former use to signify an exalted royal status rather than any connection with the Rajput clans. A. Sievler deems the latter translation to be dubious; Mehendale comments that "Rajput" simply meant a Kshatriya in the context. In another contemporary source—a letter from Jai Singh himself to his Prime Minister—, we see Shivaji being regarded to belong from a low caste (and pedigree), who was not even fit for inter-dining with Rajputs.) André Wink deems that the Sisodia genealogical claim is destined to remain disputed forever. (Note: In a footnote, Wink mentions of two letters before the coronation ceremony, where Shivaji had referred to himself as a Rajput.)

== Establishment ==
=== Ahmadnagar Sultanate ===
The earliest accepted members of the Bhonsles are Mudhoji Bhonsle and his kin Rupaji Bhonsle, who were the village headman (pāṭīl) of Hingani — this branch has been since known as Hinganikar Bhonsles. A branch seem to have split soon, who went on to claim an ancestral right to the post of district steward (deśmukhī) of Kadewalit: Suryaji Bhonsle during the reign of Ahmad Nizam Shah I (early 1490s), and his son Sharafji Bhonsle during the conquest of the region by Daniyal Mirza (1599). (Note: The precise familial relation between Mudhoji/Rupali and Suryaji is unclear.) (Note: Stewart Gordon and other scholars deem the "deśmukhī" to have served as a 'hinge' between the local populace and the royal authority which frequently changed. Without their loyalty, commanding authority in newly conquered territories was difficult.) This branch has been since known as Kadewalit Bhonsles.

The next significant Bhonsle was probably Maloji Bhosale from the Hinganikar branch. He was the great-grandson of one Kheloji (c. 1490).

The dynasty was founded by Maloji Bhosale who initially served as a patil (chief) of the Hingni Berdi and Devalgaon villages around Pune. Later, along with his brother Vithoji, he migrated to Sindkhed and served as a Horseman.

In 1577, they joined the service of the Ahmadnagar Sultanate, under Sultan Murtaza Nizam Shah I. Maloji became a trusted General of the Peshwa Malik Amber fighting against rival powers such as the Mughals and Bijapur Sultanate the parganas (administrative units) of Elur (Verul), Derhadi and Kannarad. In 1595 or 1599, Maloji was given the title of raja by Bahadur Nizam Shah, officially establishing the dynasty. On the recommendation of Malik Ambar, he was given the jagir of Pune and Supe parganas, along with the control of the Shivneri and Chakan forts. Maloji carried out the restoration of the Grishneshwar temple near Verul, and also constructed a large tank at the Shambhu Mahadev temple in Shikhar Shingnapur. Maloji and his wife Uma Bai had 2 sons: Shahaji and Sharifji, named Sufi Pir Hazrat Shah Sharif.

According to Shivabharata, composed by Shivaji's court poet Paramananda, Maloji's wife Umabai prayed to the Sufi Pir Shah Sharif of Ahmadnagar to bless her with a son. She gave birth to two sons, who were named Shahaji and Sharifji after the Pir.

=== Shivaji's Coronation ===
By 1670s, Shivaji had acquired extensive territory and wealth from his campaigns. But, lacking a formal crown, he had no operational legitimacy to rule his de facto domain and technically, remained subject to his Mughal (or Deccan Sultanate) overlords; in the hierarchy of power, Shivaji's position remained similar to fellow Maratha chieftains. (Note: Most of the great Maratha Jahagirdar families in the service of Adilshahi strongly opposed Shivaji in his early years. These included families such as the Ghadge, More, Mohite, Ghorpade, Shirke, and Nimbalkar.) Also, he was often opposed by the orthodox Brahmin community of Maharashtra. A coronation sanctioned by the Brahmins was thus planned, in a bid to proclaim sovereignty and legitimize his rule.

On proposing the Brahmins of his court to have him proclaimed as the rightful king, a controversy erupted: the regnal status was reserved for those belonging to the kshatriya varna. Not only was there a fundamental dispute among scholars on whether any true Kshatriya survived in the Kali Yuga, (Note: Madhav Deshpande notes that one of the oldest texts in support of such a viewpoint was drafted by Kamalakara Bhatta, a paternal uncle of Gaga Bhatta. However, he was hardly a radical (unlike Nagesbhatta, to whom even the Rajputs were Shudras) and allowed expiatory rites for the rare "fallen" Kshatriya-Shudras, provided he did not exceed the upanayana age-limit of 22 years. In his judgement, he was following his father Ramkrsna Bhatta as well as grandfather Narayana Bhatta.) having been all destroyed by Parashurama but also Shivaji's grandfather was a tiller-headman, Shivaji did not wear the sacred thread, and his marriage was not in accordance with the Kshatriya customs. Thus, the Brahmins had him categorised as a shudra.

Compelled to postpone his coronation, Shivaji had his secretary Balaji Avji Chitnis sent to the Sisodiyas of Mewar for inspection of the royal genealogies; Avji returned with a favorable finding — Shahji turned out to be a descendant of Chacho Sisodiya, a half-Rajput uncle of Mokal Singh. (Note: Chacho was born of a Khati concubine and in contemporary times, was pejoratively referred to as a khātanvālā. People like Chacho were categorized into separate caste-groups at the lower end of the hierarchy—even unfit for inter-dining with—, and excluded from Rajput ganayats.) Gaga Bhatt, a famed Brahmin of Banaras, (Note: Gaga Bhatt was a preeminent legal scholar, whose scholarship focused on the relative status of different varnas across different regions. Shivaji was already in contact with him since 1664, when he was asked to adjudicate upon whether the Saraswat Brahmins (then, Syenavis) were indeed Brahmins. It is very plausible that the idea of coronation was Bhatt's suggestion — during the previous encounter, he had already proclaimed Shivaji to have been born into a "pure royal family.") was then hired to ratify Chitnis' find, and the Bhonsles were now permitted to stake a claim to Kshatriya caste. (Note: Susan Bayly views the episode to reflect fluidity in the caste system.) The coronation would be re-executed in June 1674 but only after going through a long list of preludes. (Note: Contemporary Dutch East India Company archives indicate that even then, Shivaji's upgradation of status was only accepted by Brahmins after he had promised them to not rule tyrannically anymore.)

Led by Bhatt, who employed traditional Hindu imagery in an unprecedented scale, the first phase had Shivaji penance for having lived as a Maratha despite being a Kshatriya. Then came the sacred thread ceremony ('maunjibandhanam') followed by remarriage according to Kshatriya customs ('mantra-vivah') and a sequence of Vedic rituals before the eventual coronation ('abhisheka') — a public spectacle of enormous expense that heralded the rebirth of Shivaji as a Kshatriya king. (Note: The expense was huge enough to impose a coronation tax on his subjects for the next few years.) Panegyrics composed by court-poets during these spans (and afterward) reinforced onto the public memory that Shivaji (and the Bhonsles) indeed belonged from the Sisodiyas.

However, the Kshatriyization was not unanimous; a section of Brahmins continued to deny the Kshatriya status. Brahmins of the Peshwa period rejected Bhatt's acceptance of Shivaji's claims and blamed the non-dharmic coronation for all ills that plagued Shivaji and his heirs—in tune with the general Brahminical sentiment to categorize all Marathas as Shudras, carte-blanche; there have been even claims that Bhatt was excommunicated by Maratha Brahmins for his role in the coronation of Shivaji! Interestingly, all claims to Rajput ancestry had largely vanished from the family's subsequent projections of identity.

=== Maratha Empire ===
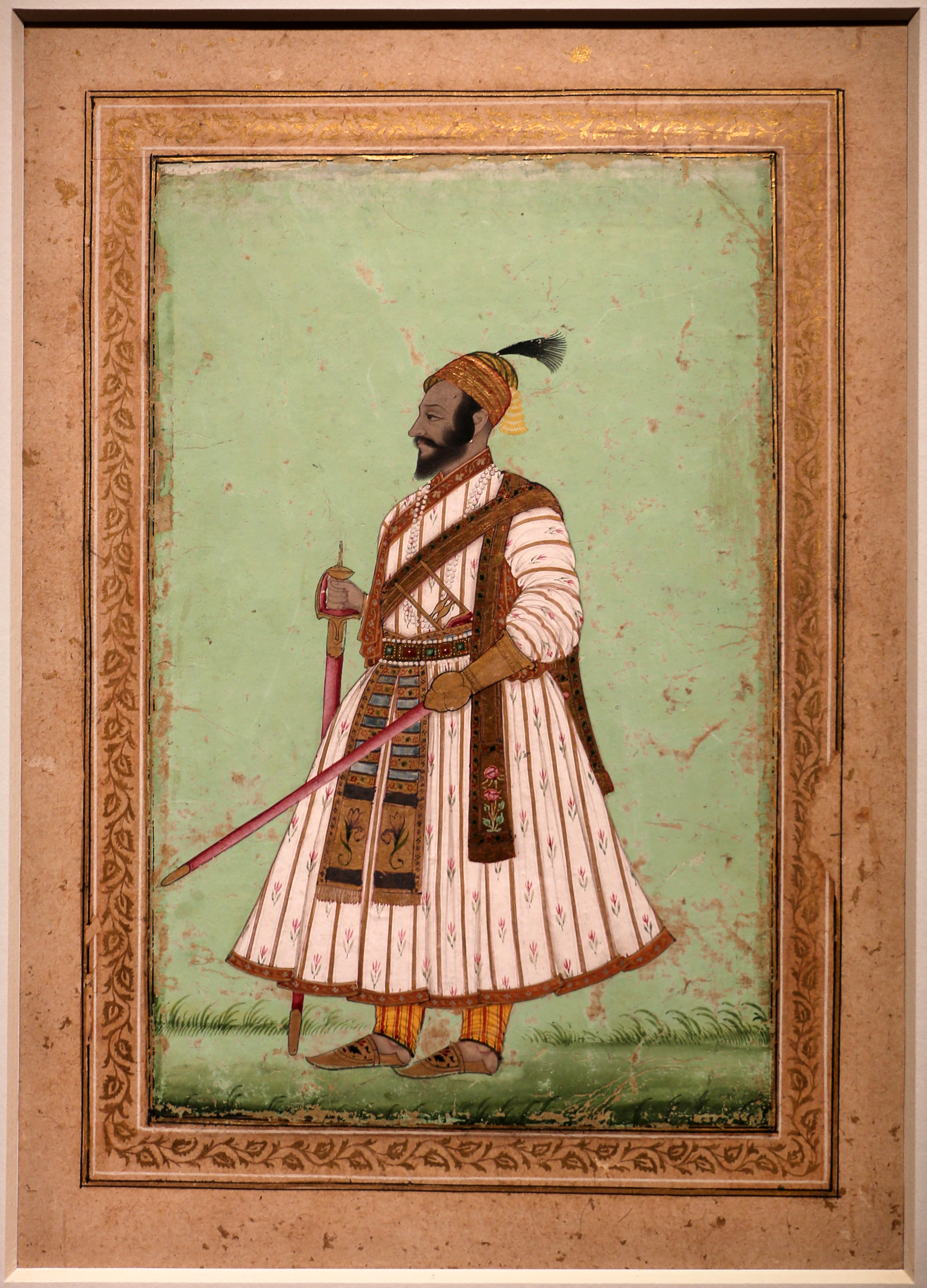
Portrait of Shivaji Bhonsle, later known as Shivaji I, the first Chhatrapati of the Maratha Empire.

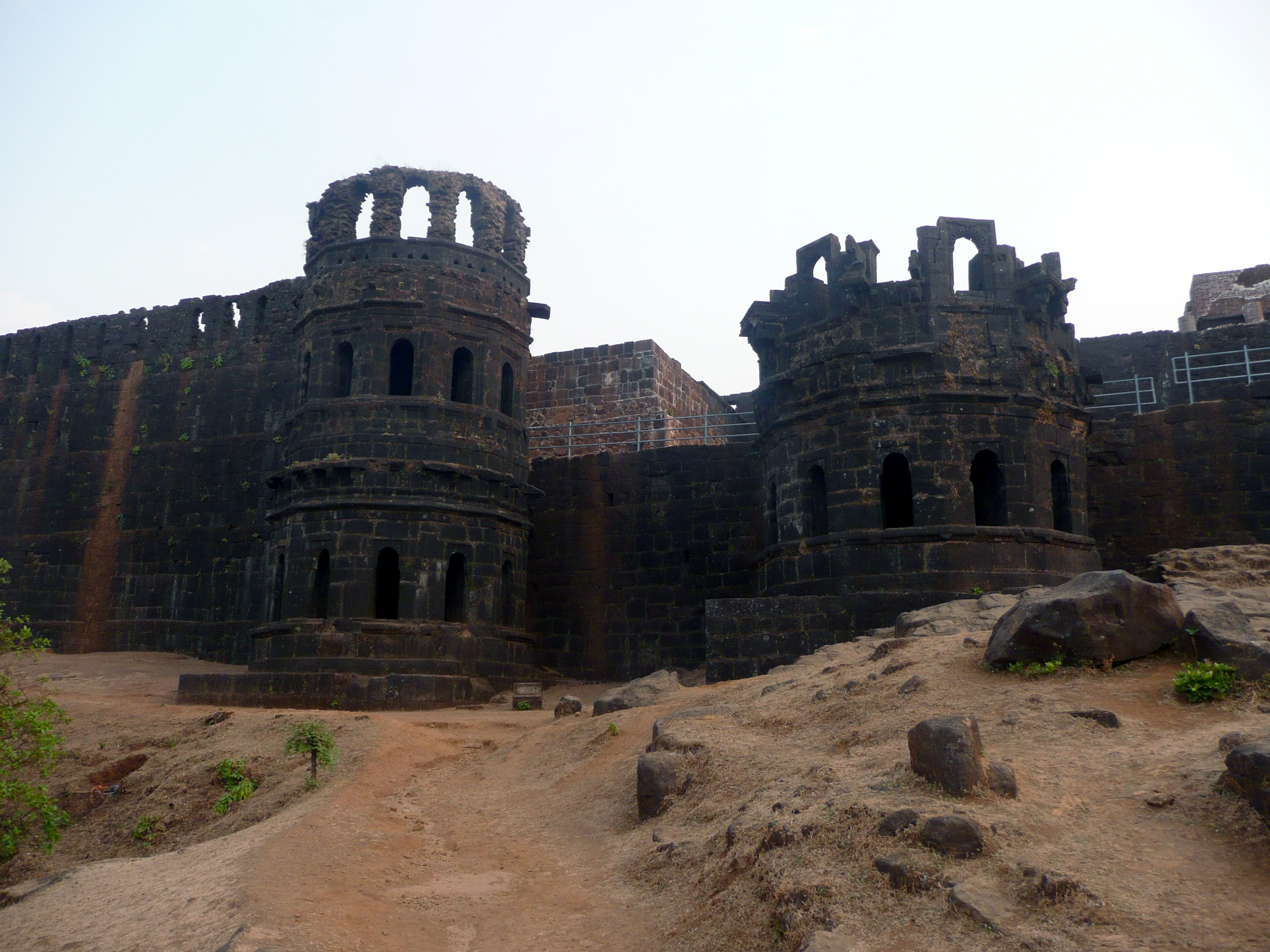
Raigad Fort served as the initial capital of the Bhonsles.

The Maratha Empire was established by Shivaji I the grandson of Maloji in 1674. This was established to invasions from the Mughal Empire and the Bijapur Sultanate. Shivaji's forces initially occupied the Fort of Torna in 1642. He had expanded his kingdom to Raigad by 1674. he crowned himself He was crowned as Chhatrapati, meaning emperor.

Shivaji wanted to establish his government based on his Philosophy of Hindavi Swarajya. (The Rule of the People) This advocated for more representation of the people and less power of the elites. He later established the Ashta Pradhan, (Modern council of ministers) an institution of a council of eight ministers to guide the administration of his nascent state. Each of the ministers was placed in charge of an administrative department; thus, the council heralded the birth of a bureaucracy. Shivaji appointed Moropant Trimbak Pingle as the Peshwa, the leader of the council.

Shivaji was succeeded by his son Sambhaji I. In early 1689, Sambhaji and his commanders met at Sangameshwar. Mughal forces, under Emperor Aurangzeb attacked Sangameshwar when Sambhaji was accompanied by just a few men. Sambhaji captured by the Mughal troops on 1 February 1689. Aurangzeb had charged Sambhaji with attacks by Maratha forces on Burhanpur. He and his advisor, Kavi Kalash, were taken to Bahadurgad by the imperial army, where they were executed by the Mughals on 21 March 1689.

After the execution of Sambhaji, Rajaram I was crowned at Raigad on 12 March 1689. During the Mughal started siege on Raigad on 25 March 1689, the widow of Sambhaji (Maharani Yesubai) and Peshwa Ramchandra Pant Amatya sent young Rajaram to the stronghold of Pratapgad through Kavlya ghat. Rajaram to escape through Kavlya ghat to the fort of Jinji through the Pratapgad and Vishalgad forts, Rajaram reached Keladi in disguise and pursued assistance from Keladi Chennamma - who kept the Mughal attack in check to ensure safe passage and escape of Rajaram to Jinji where he reached after a month and a half on 1 November 1689.

Aurangzeb sent Uzbek general Ghazi-ud-din Firoze Jung against the Marathas in the Deccan. He then sent Zulfiqar Khan Nusrat Jung to capture the Jingi Fort. He laid siege to it in September, 1690. After three failed attempts, it was finally captured after seven years on 8 January 1698. Rajaram, however, escaped and fled first to Vellore and later to Vishalgad. Rajaram returned to jinji and occupied the fort 11 November 1689, but left before it fell in 1698, setting up his court at fort Satara. Then, Maratha commanders, Santaji Ghorpade and Dhanaji Jadhav, defeated the Mughal forces, therefore cutting off their lines of communication in Jingi.

=== Kolhapur Branch ===
In 1707, Mughal Emperor Muhammad Azam Shah released Shahu Bhosale, the son of Sambhaji. However, his mother was kept as a hostage of the Mughals, in order to ensure that Shahu adhered to the release conditions. Immediately the Maratha throne was claimed his aunt Tarabai, claiming the throne for her son Shivaji II. After his victory at the Battle of Khed, Shahu established himself at Satara, forcing her to retire with her son to Kolhapur. This resulted in the creation of the Kolhapur branch in 1709 under Tarabai, splitting from the main Satara branch under Shahu.. Shivaji II and Tarabai were soon deposed by Rajasbai, the other widow of Rajaram. She installed her own son, Sambhaji II as the new ruler of Kolhapur. Sambhaji then made alliance with the Nizam. The defeat of the Nizam by Bajirao I in the Battle of Palkhed in 1728 led to the former ending his support for Sambhaji. Sambhaji II signed the Treaty of Warna in 1731 with his cousin Shahuji to formalize the two separate seats of Bhonsle family.

== Maratha Confederacy ==
=== Confederacy era ===
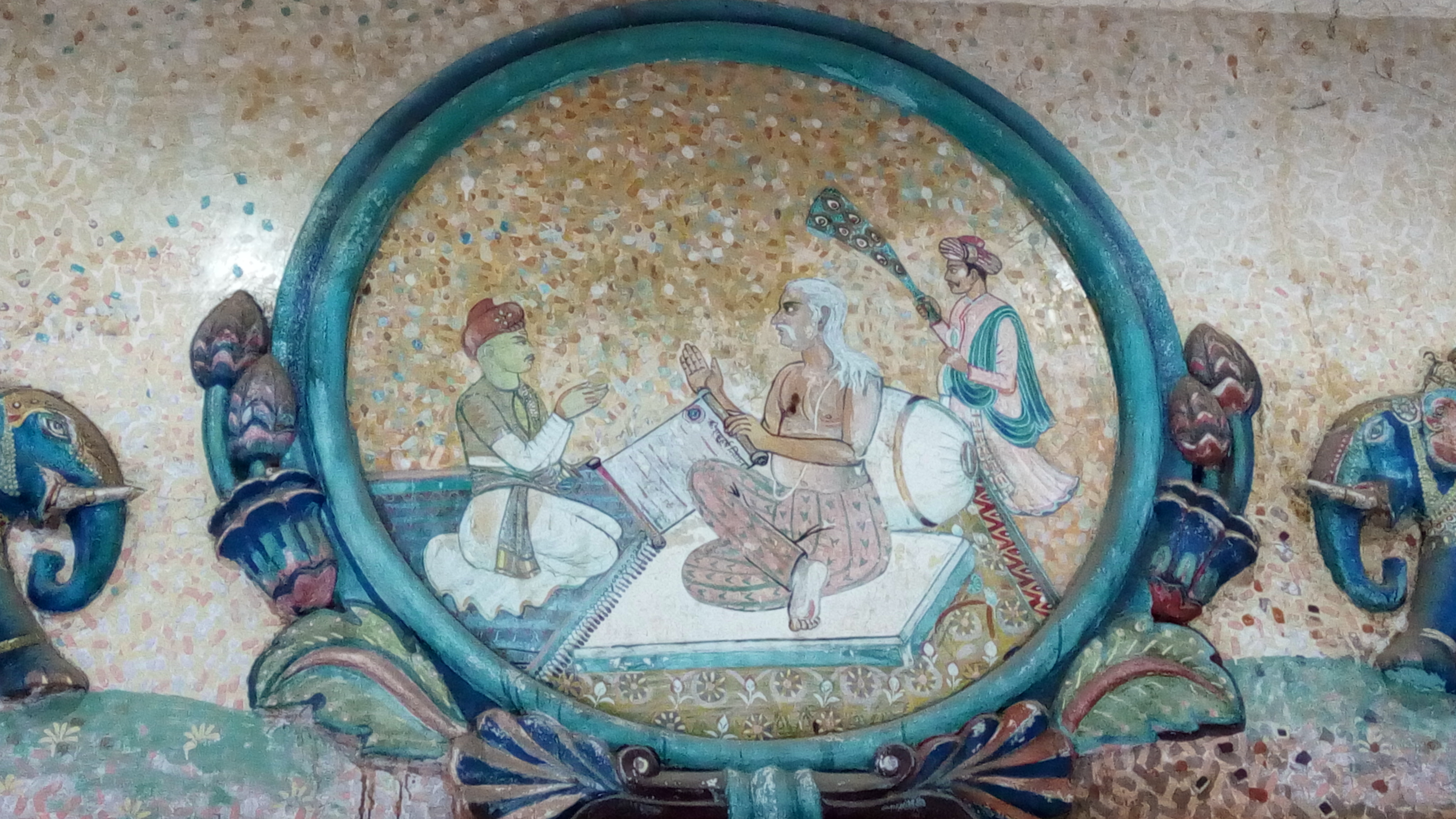
Emblem depicting Chatrapati Shahu I of the Maratha Confederacy.

Shahu appointed Balaji Vishwanath a member of the Bhat Family as his Peshwa. The Peshwa was instrumental in securing Mughal recognition of Shahu as the rightful heir of Shivaji and the Chhatrapati of the Marathas. Balaji also gained the release of Shahu's mother, Yesubai, from Mughal captivity in 1719.

The Peshwas later became de facto rulers of the Maratha Empire. Under the Peshwas, Chhatrapati was limited to simply a monarchial figurehead. Maratha Empire dominated most of the Indian subcontinent.

Under the Peshwas the Marathas expanded to their greatest extent. 1737, Under Bajirao I invaded Delhi in a blitzkrieg manner at the Battle of Delhi (1737). The Nizam set out from the Deccan to rescue the Mughals from the invasion of the Marathas, but was defeated decisively in the Battle of Bhopal. The Marathas extracted a large tribute from the Mughals and signed a treaty which ceded Malwa to the Marathas. The Battle of Vasai was fought between the Marathas and the Portuguese in Vasai, a village lying on the northern shore of Vasai creek (Part of modern-day Mumbai).

After Shahu's death, he was succeeded by Rajaram II When Peshwa Balaji Baji Rao left for the Mughal frontier, Tarabai urged Rajaram II to remove him from the post of Peshwa. When Rajaram refused, she imprisoned him in a dungeon at Satara, on 24 November 1750. She claimed that he was an imposter from Gondhali caste and she had falsely presented him as her grandson to Shahu. His health deteriorated considerably during this imprisonment. On 14 September 1752, Tarabai and Balaji Rao took an oath at Khandoba temple in Jejuri, promising mutual peace.

=== Nagpur Branch ===
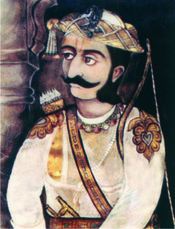
Raghuji I, the first ruler of Nagpur, expanded the state to its greatest extent.

After the death of Chand Sultan, the Gond ruler of Deogarh, in 1739, there were quarrels over the succession, leading to the throne being usurped by Wali Shah, an illegitimate son of Bakht Buland Shah. Chand Sultan's widow Ratan Kunwar invoked the aid of the Maratha leader Raghoji Bhonsle of Berar in the interest of her sons Akbar Shah and Burhan Shah. Wali Shah was put to death and the rightful heirs placed on the throne. Raghoji I Bhonsle was sent back to Berar with a plentiful bounty for his aid. Raghoji then declared himself the King of Nagpur and the 'protector' of the Gond king. Thus in 1743, Burhan Shah was practically made a state pensionary, with real power being in the hands of the Maratha ruler. After this event the history of the Gond kingdom of Deogarh is not recorded.

During Shahu's reign, Raghoji Bhosale of Nagpur expanded the empire Eastwards, invading Bengal in 1740, which was a major confrontation with the Nawab of the Carnatic, Dost Ali Khan . Raghoji was victorious and increased Maratha Influence in the Carnatic.

after the successful campaign in Carnatic at the Battle of Trichinopolly. Raghoji invaded Bengal. Raghoji was able to annex Orissa permanently as he successfully exploited the chaotic conditions prevailing in the region after the death of their Governor Murshid Quli Khan in 1727. Nawab of Bengal ceded territory up to the river Suvarnarekha to the Marathas, and agreeing to pay Rs. 20 lacs as chauth for Bengal (includes both West Bengal and Bangladesh) and 12 lacs for Bihar (including Jharkhand), thus Bengal becoming a tributary to the Marathas.

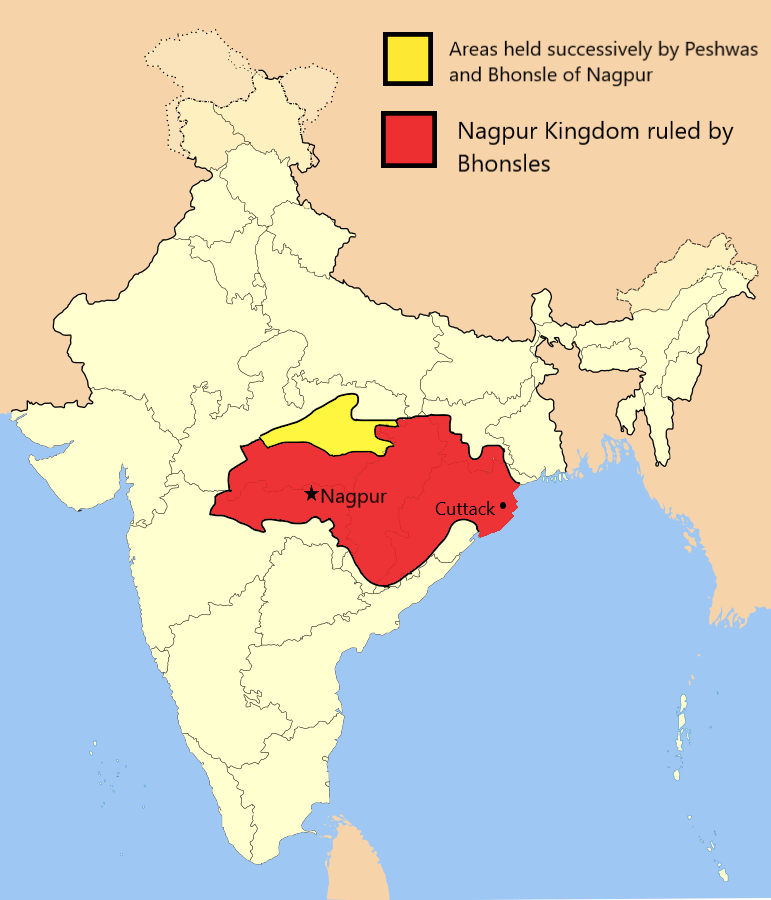
the Kingdom of Nagpur at its greatest extent in 1751.

On 17 December 1803, after the Second Anglo-Maratha War, Raghoji II signed the Treaty of Deogaon which resulted in Nagpur becoming a Protectorate of the East India Company.

On 11 December 1853, the last Raja of Nagpur Raghuji III died without a male heir. Nagpur was annexed by the British under the doctrine of lapse. The former kingdom was administered as Nagpur Province, under a commissioner appointed by then Governor-General of India, James Broun-Ramsay.

=== Thanjavur Branch ===
The Bhonsoles were also influential in the Carnatic Region. In 1675, the Sultan of Bijapur sent a force commanded by the Maratha general Venkoji a half-brother of the Shivaji, to Capture the city of Thanjavur and Established the Thanjavur Maratha Kingdom. Venkoji defeated Alagiri, and occupied Thanjavur. He did not, however, place his protege on the throne as instructed by the Bijapur Sultan, but seized the kingdom and made himself king. Thus began the rule of the Marathas over Thanjavur.

Shivaji Maharaj also invaded Gingee and Thanjavur in 1676–1677 and made his brother Santaji the ruler of all lands to the north of the Coleroon.

=== Princely States ===
Satara State, Kolhapur State, Thanjavur State, Nagpur State, Akkalkot State, Sawantwadi State and Barshi were amongst the prominent states ruled by the Bhonsles.

== List of Members ==
=== Maratha Confederacy ===
Image	Name	Birth	Reign	Death	Notes
	Shivaji I	19 February 1630	1674–1680	3 April 1680	
	Sambhaji	14 May 1657	16 January 1681 – 11 March 1689	11 March 1689	
	Rajaram I	24 February 1670	11 March 1689 – 3 March 1700	3 March 1700	
	Shivaji II	9 June 1696	1700 – 1707, 1710 – 1714 (Kolhapur State)	14 March 1726	
	Shahu I	18 May 1682	12 January 1707 – November 16, 1713	15 December 1749	
	Rajaram II	June 1726	15 December 1749 – 11 December 1777	11 December 1777	Became a Puppet ruler under Balaji Bajirao in 1749
	Shahu II	1763	11 December 1777 – 3 May 1808	3 May 1808	A ceremonial ruler with the actual power resting with the leaders of Maratha confederacy around India.
	Pratapsingh	18 January 1793	3 May 1808 – 3 June 1818	14 October 1847	Last Chhatrapati of the Maratha Confederacy

=== Satara State ===
Image	Name	Birth	Reign	Death	Notes
	Pratapsingh	18 January 1793	3 June 1818 – 5 September 1839	14 October 1847	Became Raja of the Satara state. He was deposed by the East India company in 1839.
	Shahaji	1802	5 September 1839 – 5 April 1848	5 April 1848	Satara state abolished after the death of Appasaheb by the East India Company under the policy of Doctrine of lapse

=== Kolhapur State ===
Image	Name	Birth	Reign	Death	Notes
	Tarabai	1675	1709 – 1710 (Unofficial)	1761	Established the Branch of Kolhapur.
	Shivaji II	9 June 1696	1710 – 1714	14 March 1726	First Official Raja of kolhapur.Deposed by his stepmother, Rajasbai in favour of her own son, Sambhaji II
	Sambhaji II	1698	1714–1760	18 December 1760	Signed treaty of Varna with Shahu I to formalize the existence of two seats of the dynasty at Satara and Kolhapur respectively.
	Shivaji III	1756	22 September 1762 – 24 April 1813	24 April 1813	
	Sambhaji III	1801	24 April 1813 – 2 July 1821	2 July 1821	
	Shivaji IV	1816	July 2, 1821 – Jan 03 1822	January 3, 1822	
	Shahaji I	22 January 1802	3 January 1822 – 29 November 1838	29 November 1838	
	Shivaji V	26 December 1830	1838–1866	4 August 1866	
	Rajaram II	April 13, 1850	August 18, 1866 – November 30, 1870	November 30, 1870	
	Shivaji VI	April 5, 1863	1871–1883	December 25, 1883	
	Shahu IV (overall)Shahu I of Kolhapur	26 June 1874	2 April 1894 – 6 May 1922	6 May 1922	
	Rajaram III	31 July 1897	1922–1940	26 November 1940	
	Shivaji VII	22 November 1941	31 December 1941 – 28 September 1946	28 September 1946	
	Shahaji II	4 April 1910	1947–1971	9 May 1983	

=== Nagpur state ===
Image	Name	Birth	Reign	Death	Notes
	Raghoji I	1695	1739 – 14 February 1755	14 February 1755	First Bhonsle ruler of Nagpur.
	Janoji		14 February 1755 – 21 May 1772	21 May 1772	
	Mudhoji I		21 May 1772 – 19 May 1788	19 May 1788	
	Raghoji II		19 May 1788 – 22 March 1816	22 March 1816	
	Parsoji	1788	22 March 1816 – 2 Feb 1817	2 Feb 1817	
	Mudhoji II	1796	2 Feb 1817 – 15 Mar 1818	15 Mar 1818	
	Raghuji III	1808	15 Mar 1818 – 11 Dec 1853	11 Dec 1853	Last Bhonsle ruler of Nagpur.

== Family tree ==
Family tree of Maratha Chhatrapatis
Biological Child
Adopted Child

Maloji; Bhosale
Shahaji; Bhosale
Shivaji I Chhatrapati^{(1)} r. 1674-1680	Vyankoji I Raja of Thanjavur r. 1675-1684
Thanjavur; Branch
Sambhaji I Chhatrapati^{(2)} r. 1681-1689	Tarabai	Rajaram I Chhatrapati^{(3)} r. 1689-1700
Shahu I Chhatrapati^{(5)} r. 1707-1749	Shivaji II; Chhatrapati^{(4)} r. 1700-1707; Raja of Kolhapur r. 1710-1714	Sambhaji II; Raja of Kolhapur r. 1714-1760
?	Kolhapur; Branch
Rajaram II; Chhatrapati^{(6)} r. 1749-1777
Shahu II; Chhatrapati^{(7)} r. 1777-1808
Pratap; Singh; Chhatrapati^{(8)} r. 1808-1818; Raja of Satara r. 1818-1839	Shahaji; Raja of Satara r. 1839-1848

== See also ==
- List of Maratha dynasties and states

== Sources ==
- Montgomery, Bernard Law (1972). A Concise History of Warfare. Collins. ISBN 9780001921498.
- Sen, Sailendra Nath (2010). An Advanced History of Modern India. Macmillan India. pp. 1941–. ISBN 978-0-230-32885-3.
