= Pratap Singh of Satara =

Chhatrapati of the Marathas (r. 1808–1818) and Raja of Satara (r. 1818–1839)

Pratap Singh
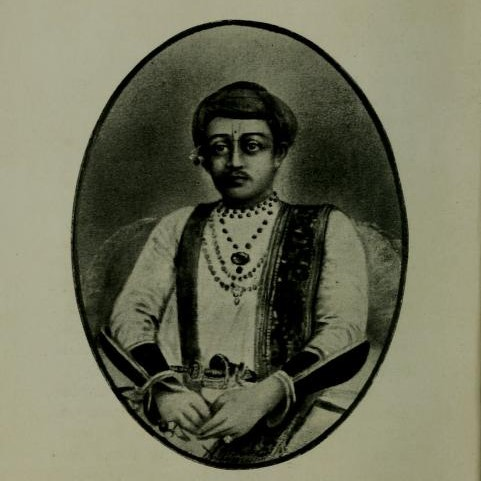
- Pratap Singh in 1808

Chhatrapati of the Maratha Empire
- Reign: 3 May 1808 – 3 June 1818
- Coronation: 12 April 1808
- Predecessor: Shahu II
- Successor: Monarchy abolished
- Regent: Baji Rao II

Raja of the Satara State
- Reign: 3 June 1818 – 5 September 1839
- Coronation: 9 April 1818
- Predecessor: Position established (Note: Satara State was formed after the overthrow of the Maratha Empire in 1818)
- Successor: Shahaji

Head of the Bhonsle family
- Predecessor: Shahu II
- Successor: Shahaji
- Born: 18 January 1793; Ajinkyatara Fort, Satara, Maratha Empire
- Died: 14 October 1847 (aged 54); Varanasi, Company Raj
- Burial: 15 October 1847; Manikarnika Cremation Ground, Varanasi, India
Names
- Fateh Singh Pratap Khan Bhonsle
- Dynasty: Bhonsle
- Father: Shahu II
- Religion: Deccan Shaivite Hinduism
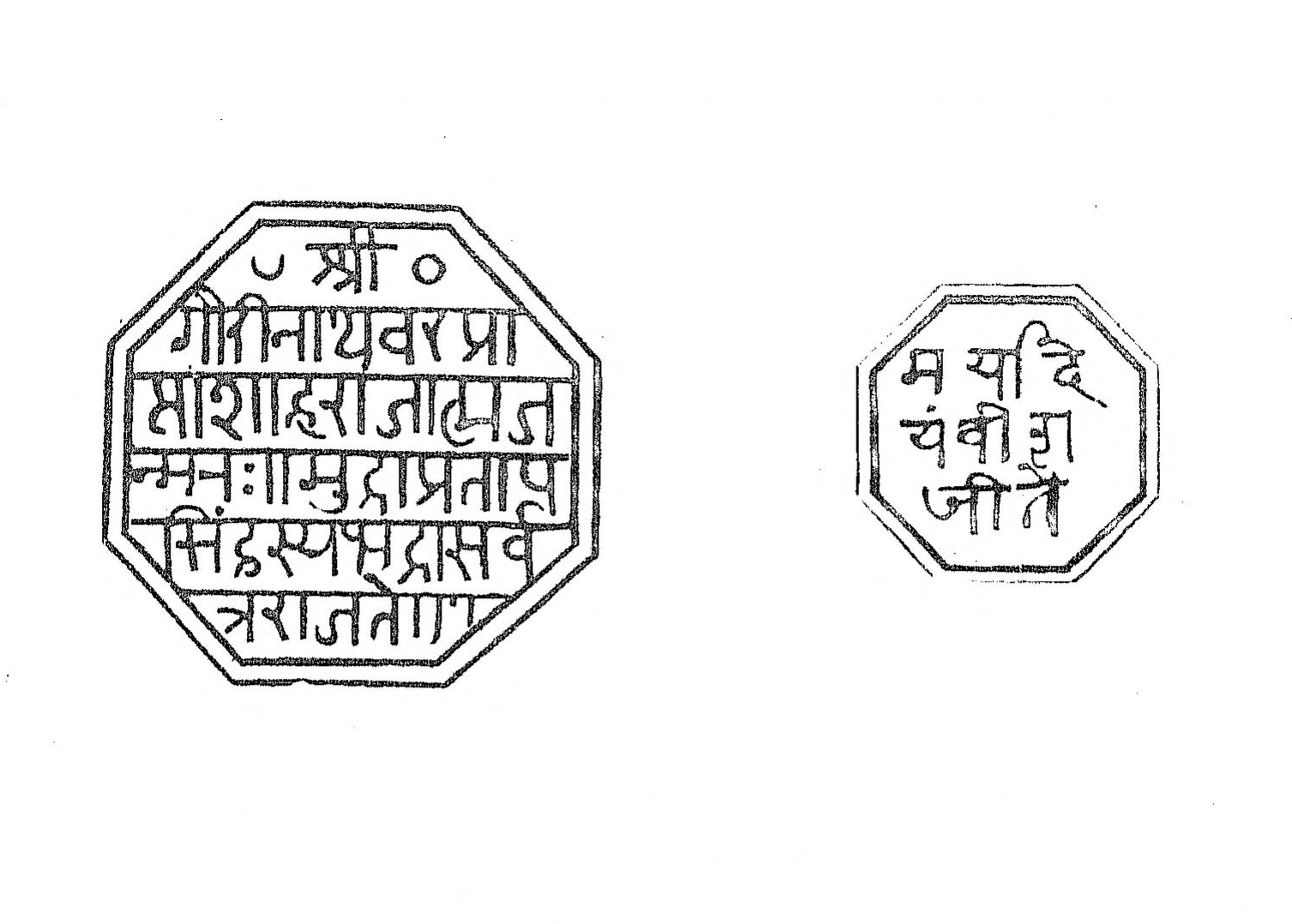
- Imperial Seal
- Military career
- Conflicts: Third Anglo-Maratha War

Pratap Singh Bhonsle (Note: Hindustani (Hindi): प्रतापसिंह भोंसले, Pratāpasingh Bhonsle; Marathi: प्रतापसिंह भोसले, Pratāpasinh Bhosale; also known as Pratap Singh of India.) (18 January 1793 – 14 October 1847) was the last Chhatrapati of the Maratha Empire from 1808 until the empire's overthrow and his abdication in 1818, following the Third Anglo-Maratha War. He was later made the Raja of Satara State until 1839 in his retire. Pratap Singh was a Marathi poet and scholar but was also a patron of Hindi.

Pratap Singh was the son and successor of Shahu II, who died in 1808 and Singh was crowned as the new Maratha emperor. He was recognized as the Emperor of Hindustan (India) by the time Bahadur Shah's sovereignty was limited within the Old Delhi, who was later declared as the Emperor of Hindustan, following Maratha Empire's overthrow. He was the Chhatrapati of India during the Third Anglo-Maratha War, the last war fought for the succession of power in India by Marathas and the East India Company. After the empire was overthrown by the Company on 3 June 1818, Pratap Singh was ultimately dethroned However the East India Company made him as Raja of Satara which functioned as their puppet state onwards. on 5 September 1839, the East India Company forced Pratap Singh to exile at Varanasi after he was found guilty in conspiring against the Britishers.The company made his brother Shahaji I as the newly crowned Raja of Satara. Pratap Singh died in 1847 due to natural causes, in his exile in Varanasi.

== Descent ==
He was born in the Bhonsle clan of Maratha caste.

== Early life ==
Pratap Singh was the eldest son of Shahu II of Satara, whom he succeeded, and a descendant of Chatrapati Shivaji Maharaj, the founder of the Maratha Empire.

== Raja ==
Pratap Singh was dethroned and stripped of his powers and personal possessions by the British in 1839. He was exiled to Benares and granted an allowance for his maintenance. Rango Bapuji Gupte, a loyal Sardar to him, long fought unsuccessful legal battles in London on his behalf.

He was succeeded by his brother, Appa Saheb, under the title Shreemant Maharaj Shaji Raja Chhatrapati of Satara. Appa Saheb then became known as Raja Shahaji.

== Reign ==
During his reign, Pratap Singh undertook significant administrative, infrastructural, and educational reforms that contributed to the development of modern Satara.

One of his major contributions was the construction of the Pune–Satara Road, improving connectivity between Satara and Pune. He also built the Satara–Medha–Mahabaleshwar Road, facilitating access to Mahabaleshwar, which later became a prominent hill station during British rule. At Mahabaleshwar, he established Malcolm Peth (now part of Mahabaleshwar), named in honour of the contemporary Governor of Bombay.

In Satara, Pratap Singh constructed the ‘Rajwada’ palace, which functioned as the royal court for approximately 150 years. The palace is presently in the possession of his descendants. He also developed the Rajpath, a two-way road connecting the Rajwada to Powai Naka, contributing to the planned urban layout of the city.

Following the destruction of the Rang Mahal of Shahu I in a fire, Pratap Singh built the Jal Mandir Palace as a new royal residence for himself and his family. Much of modern Satara’s foundational urban structure is attributed to his initiatives.

In the field of education, he established two schools in Satara offering instruction in English, Persian, Marathi, and Sanskrit. Around 1851, Pratap Singh High School was founded; notably, B. R. Ambedkar studied there until the fourth standard.

In the same year, his wife founded a private library in Satara that was open to the public. This institution later became known as the Nagar Vachanalaya and was formerly called Chhatrapati Pratap Singh Maharaj (Thorle) Nagar Vachanalaya, Satara.

== Notes ==
| Preceded by Shahu II of Satara | Chhatrapati of the Maratha Empire; 1808–1818 | Succeeded by Lapsed |

| Preceded by New creation | Raja of Satara; 1818–1839 | Succeeded by Shahaji |
