= Satara State =

Princely state in India

- 1818–1849
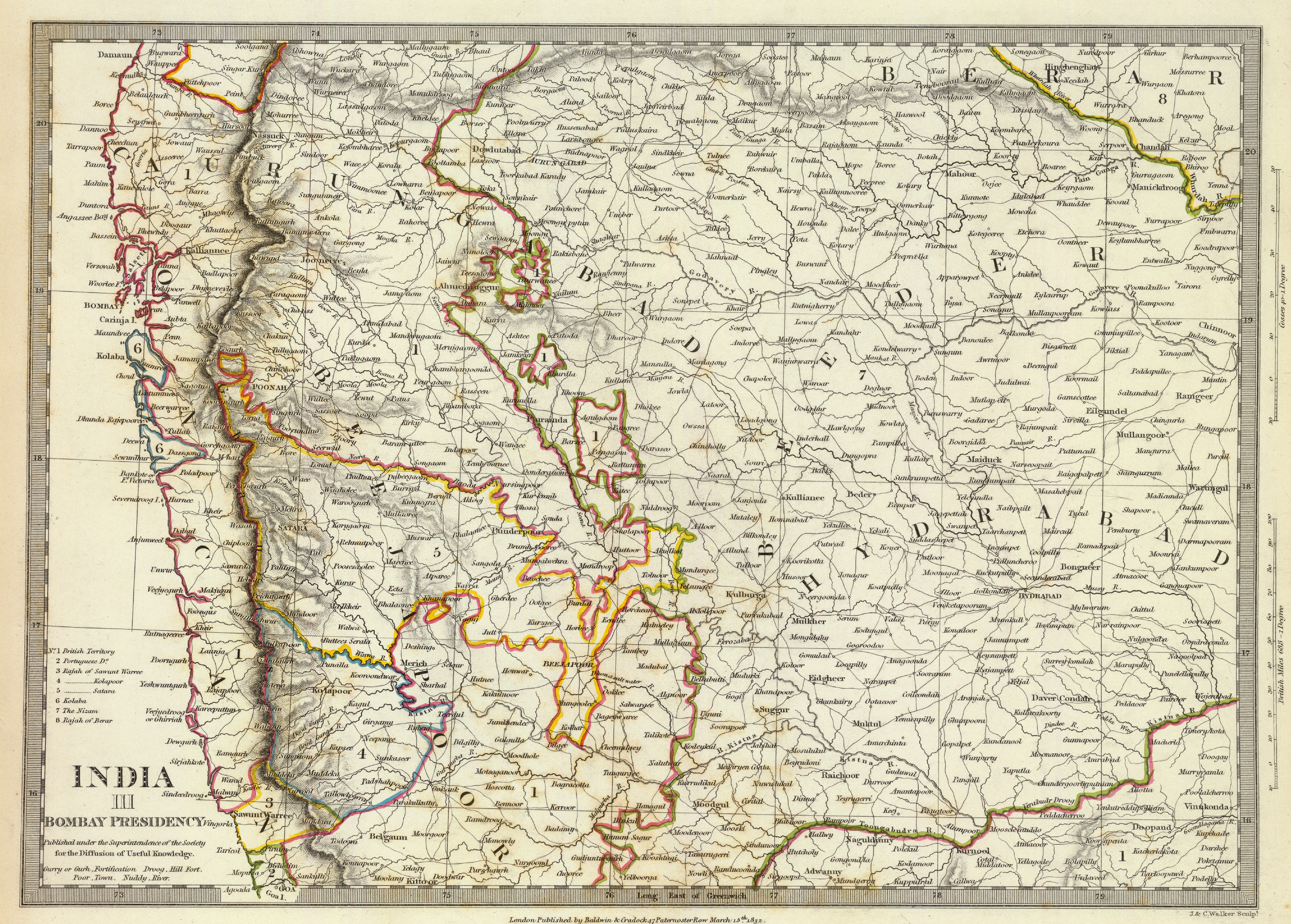
- Satara State in 1832
- Status: Princely state of the British East India Company
- Capital: Satara
- Official languages: Marathi
- Religion: Hinduism and other minority religions
- Government: Monarchy
- Chhatrapati/Raja
  - 1818 – 1839: Pratap Singh (first)
  - 1839 – 1849: Shahaji (last)
- History
  - Established: 1818
  - Disestablished: 1849

Area
- 1901: 11,144 km^{2} (4,303 sq mi)
- 1848: 7,924 km^{2} (3,059 sq mi)

Population
  - 1901: 671,000
- Currency: Rupee, Paisa, Shivrai
| Preceded by | Succeeded by |
| Maratha Empire | Company rule in India |
- Today part of: India

The Satara State was a Maratha rump state in India created after the fall of the Maratha Confederacy in 1818 following the Third Anglo-Maratha War, and annexed by the British in 1849 using the Doctrine of lapse. The state was ruled by the Bhonsle dynasty, descendants of Shivaji, the founder of the Maratha kingdom.

The first Raja of the state was Pratap Singh who was installed on the throne by the British after they defeated Peshwa Bajirao II in 1818. Pratap Singh was deposed in 1838. His brother, Shahaji succeeded him but died without a natural heir in 1848 and At that time the Revenue of entire satara princely state was 15,00,000 rupees just before its annexation under the Doctrine of Lapse (1848). Afterward the revenue was 30,00,000 rupees around 1901. At that time, the East India Company government refused to accept Shahaji's adopted son as his successor under the company's Doctrine of lapse, a policy introduced by the then Governor, Lord Dalhousie, and absorbed the territory into the growing British dominion.

== Rulers of Maratha Empire ==
Satara State:

- Shivaji I (r. 1674–1680) (Founder of the Maratha Empire and Crowned as Chhatrapati in 1674 at Raigad Fort.)
- Sambhaji (r. 1680–1689) (Son of Shivaji & Fought against Aurangzeb but was captured and executed in 1689.)
- Rajaram I (r. 1689–1700) (Younger son of Shivaji and Rajaram Maharaj died of lung disease in 1700.)
- Shivaji II (r. 1700–1708) (Grandson of Shivaji Maharaj and Released by the Mughals in 1707 after Aurangzeb’s death. His reign saw the rise of the Peshwas, who became the de facto rulers of the Maratha Empire.)
- Shahu I (r. 1708–1749) (son of Sambhaji and grandson of Chhatrapati Shivaji, he was the first ruler of Satara after the Mughal emperor released him from captivity)
- Rajaram II (r. 1749–1777) (nominally, grandson of Rajaram I) and (Queen Tarabai ruled after Shahu I but had little real power as the Peshwas controlled the administration)
- Shahu II (r. 1777–1808) (His reign saw increasing British interference)
- Pratap Singh (r. 1808–1839) – After the fall of the Peshwas in 1818, He signed a treaty with the East India Company ceding part of the sovereignty of his kingdom to the British company
- Shahji III (Appa Saheb) (r. 1839–1848) (The last ruler before the British annexed Satara under the Doctrine of Lapse)
- Venkatji (Bhau Saheb) (r. 1848–1864)
- Pratapsinhji I (Bhau Saheb) (r. 1865–1874)
- Rajaram III (Abba Saheb) (r. 1874–1904)
- Shivaji Rajaram (Anna Saheb) (r. 1904–1914)
- Pratapsinh II (Bhau Saheb) (r. 1914–1925)
- Shahu (Bala Saheb) (r. 1925–1950)
- Pratapsinh (Baba Saheb) (r. 1950–1978)
- Udayanraje Bhosale (r. 1978–present)

== Territory ==
The state comprised the modern day Satara district, and parts of the Pune district, the Sangli district, the Solapur district and the Bijapur district, Karnataka.

== See also ==
- Kolhapur State
