= Sambal (drum) =

Folk drum from western India

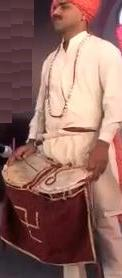
Sambal drum

The sambal is a drum of the Gondhali people. It is a folk drum found among the Kokna people of Dadra, Nagar Haveli, Maharashtra, Goa and North Karnataka in Western India.

The instrument consists of two connected wooden drums with skin membranes stretched over their tops. Two wooden sticks, one of which has a curved end, are used to play the sambal.

Sambal is a traditional instrument used by people who are devotees of Mahalaxmi Devi and used in the gondhal (a ritual).
