= Raja Shahaji of Satara =

Last Raja of Satara from 1839–1848

Shahaji
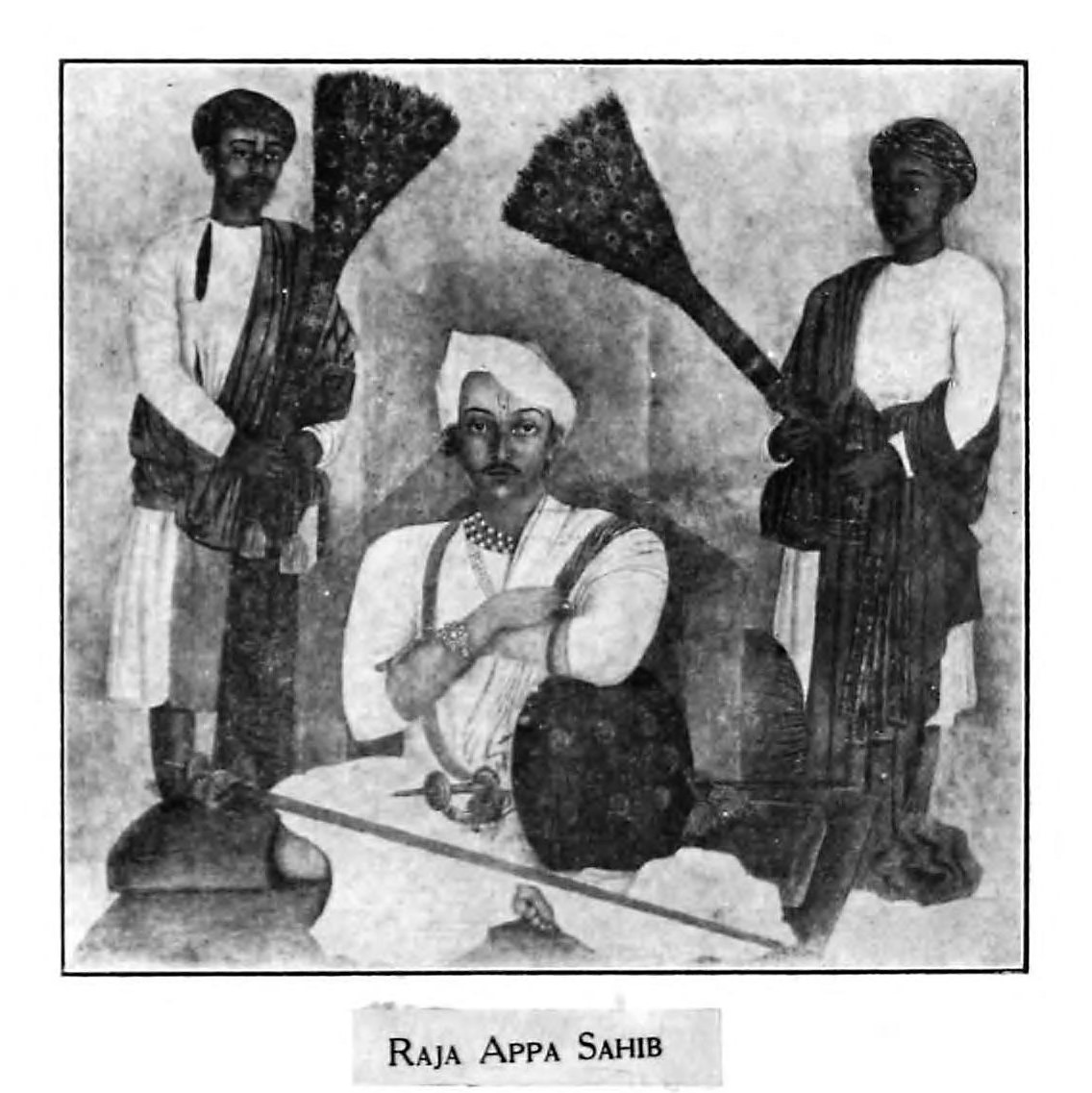

Raja Chhatrapati of Satara
- Reign: 5 September 1839 – 5 April 1848
- Predecessor: Pratap Singh
- Successor: Position abolished Venkatji Bhosale (as pretender)
- Born: 1802; Jangli, Satara, Maratha Confederacy (present-day Maharashtra, India)
- Died: 5 April 1848 (aged 46); Satara, Satara State, British India (present-day Maharashtra, India)
- Issue: Venkatji Bhonsale (adoptive son)
Names
- Shreemant Maharaj Shahaji Bhosale Raja Chhatrapati of Satara
- House: Bhonsale
- Father: Trimbukji Bhonsale
- Religion: Hinduism

Shahaji (Shahaji Bhonsale, Marathi pronunciation: [ʃaːhaːdʑiː ˈbʱos(ə)le]; 1802 – 5 April 1848) ruled the Indian princely state of Satara from 1839 until his death in 1848. He was also known as Appa Saheb, and his full titles were Shreemant Maharaj Shahaji Bhonsle Raja Chhatrapati of Satara. He was descendant of Chhatrapati Shivaji and Sambhaji.

His elder brother Raja Pratap Singh, Raja of Satara was dethroned and stripped of his powers and personal possessions by the British East India Company in 1839. Appa Sahib succeeded his brother under the title Raja Chhatrapati of Satara.

== See also ==
The rest of the list of titular kings of Satara can be found by clicking here: Chhhatrapatis of Satara

Preceded by Raja Pratap Singh, Raja of Satara	Raja of Satara; 1839–1848	Succeeded by Lapsed
