= Rajaram II of Satara =

Chhatrapati of the Marathas from 1749 to 1777

Rajaram II
- Maharaj

Chhatrapati of the Marathas
- Reign: 15 December 1749 – 11 December 1777
- Predecessor: Shahu I
- Successor: Shahu II
- Peshwa: Balaji Baji Rao; Madhavrao I; Narayan Rao; Raghunath Rao; Madhavrao II
- Born: June 1726; Kolhapur, Maratha Empire (present-day Maharashtra, India)
- Died: 11 December 1777 (aged 51); Satara, Maratha Empire (present-day Maharashtra, India)
- Issue: Shahu II of Satara (adopted)
- House: Bhonsale
- Father: Shahu I (adoptive); Shivaji II (claimed biological)
- Mother: Bhavani Bai
- Religion: Hinduism

Rajaram II (Rajaram Bhonsale, Marathi pronunciation: [[ɾaːd͡ʒaɾaːm ˈbʱos(ə)le]; June 1726 – 11 December 1777), also known as Ramaraja, was the sixth Chhatrapati of the Maratha Empire. He was an adopted son of Chhatrapati Shahu I. Tarabai had presented him to Shahu as her own grandson and used him to grab power after Shahu's death. However, after being sidelined, she stated that Rajaram II was only an impostor. Nevertheless, Balaji Baji Rao retained him as the Chhatrapati. In reality, Peshwa and other chiefs had all the executive power, while Rajaram II was only a nominal head of the Marathas.

== Early life ==
After Shahu's death, Rajaram II was appointed as the new Chhatrapati, the King of Marathas. When Peshwa Balaji Baji Rao left for the Mughal frontier, Tarabai urged Rajaram II to remove him from the post of Peshwa. When Rajaram refused, she imprisoned him in a dungeon at Satara, on 24 November 1750. She claimed that he was an imposter from Gondhali caste and she had falsely presented him as her grandson to Shahu. His health deteriorated considerably during this imprisonment. Tarabai later signed a peace treaty with Balaji Rao, acknowledging his superiority. On 14 September 1752, Tarabai and Balaji Rao took an oath at Khandoba temple in Jejuri, promising mutual peace. At this oath ceremony, Tarabai also swore that Rajaram II was not her grandson, but an impostor from the Gondhali caste. Nevertheless, the Peshwa retained Rajaram II as the titular Chhatrapati and a powerless figurehead.

== Reign ==
During Rajaram II's reign, the power of the Chhatrapati based in Satara was almost totally overshadowed by his hereditary Peshwas belonging to the Bhat family in Pune and other commanders of the confederacy such as the Holkars, Gaekwad, Scindia and Bhonsale (Nagpur). During this period, the Marathas were engaged in a continual conflict with the Durrani Empire based in Afghanistan. the Third Battle of Panipat took place in his time. The Marathas and the Mughals signed an agreement in 1752. The Marathas agreed to help the Mughals defeat external aggression as well as internal rebellions. The Mughals agreed to appoint Peshwa Balaji Rao as the Subahdar of Ajmer and Agra subah. The Marathas were also granted the right to collect chauth from Lahore, Multan, Sindh subahs as well as some districts of Hissar and Moradabad. However, the Mughal emperor had also ceded Lahore and Multan to Ahmad Shah Durrani in order to pacify him. In addition, he did not ratify the transfer of Rajput-ruled territories like Ajmer to the Marathas. This brought the Marathas in conflict with Durranis as well as Rajputs. Madho Singh sought help from Shuja-ud-Daula as well as the Afghan king Ahmad Shah Durrani (Abdali). The Maratha-Jat relations also worsened during Rajaram's reign.

He was succeeded by Shahu II of Satara, another adopted titular ruler.

| Preceded by Shahuji | Chhatrapati of the Maratha Empire; 1749–1777 | Succeeded by Shahu II |
