= Rajsitapur =

Rajsitapur રાજસીતાપુર
- Village
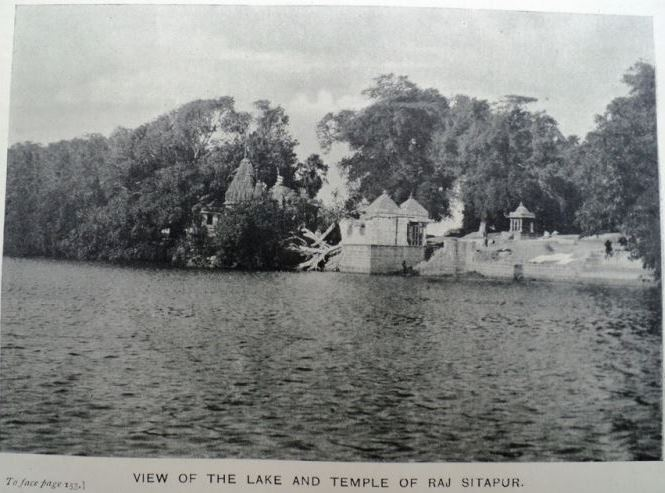
- Rajsitapur lake and Ambaji Temple

- Location in Gujarat, India Rajsitapur (India)
- Coordinates: 22.8678°N 71.5848°E
- Country: India
- State: Gujarat
- District: Surendranagar

Area
  - Total: 3,026.17 ha (7,477.8 acres)
- Elevation: 54 m (177 ft)

Population (2011)
  - Total: 3,701
  - Density: 122.3/km^{2} (316.8/sq mi)
- Time zone: UTC+5:30 (IST)
- PIN: 363320
- STD Code: 02754

Rajsitapur is a village in the Dhrangadhra block of the Surendranagar district in Gujarat, India. It is 18 kilometres (11 mi) north of the Surendranagar district headquarters. Sanjay Gadhvi, the director of Dhoom, came from the village.

== Demographics ==
The census of 2011 found 771 families residing in the Rajsitapur Village, with 3701 people. 1936 are males while 1765 are females. The predominant religion is Hindu.

== Government ==
Rajsitapur village is administrated by Sarpanch (Head of Village) who is the elected representative of village.
