= Shahu II of Satara =

Chhatrapati of the Marathas from 1777 to 1808

Shahu II
- Maharaj
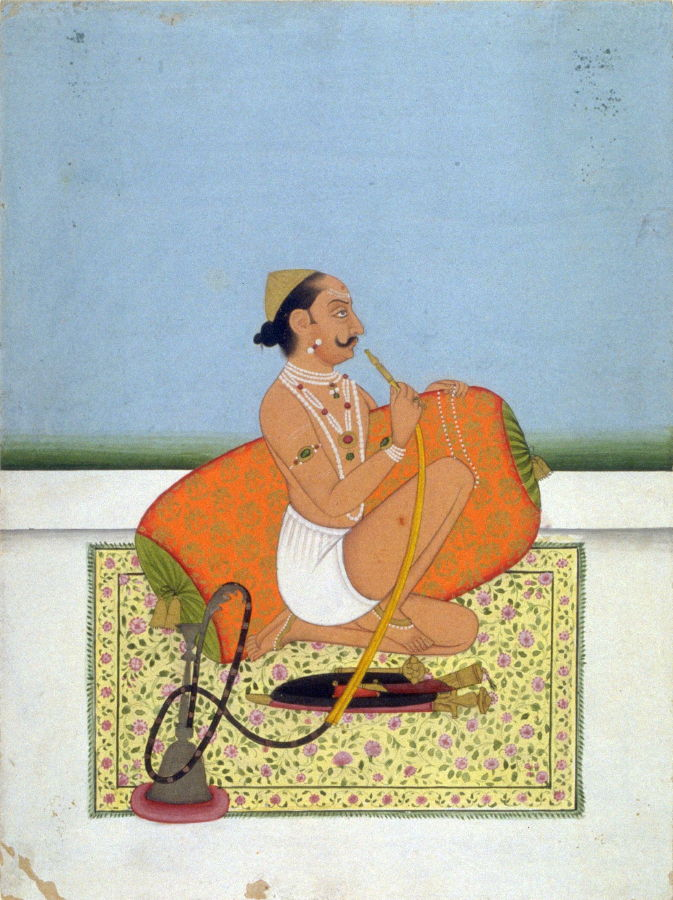
- Early 19th century portrait of Shahu II.

Chhatrapati of the Marathas
- Reign: 11 December 1777 – 3 May 1808
- Predecessor: Rajaram II
- Successor: Pratap Singh
- Peshwa: Baji Rao II
- Born: 1763; Wavi, Nashik, Maratha Confederacy (present-day Nashik district, Maharashtra, India)
- Died: 3 May 1808 (aged 44–45); Satara, Maratha Confederacy (present-day Maharashtra, India)
- Spouse: Girijabai Bhosle
- Issue: Pratap Singh of Satara
- House: Bhonsale
- Father: Trimbakjiraje Bhonsle; Rajaram II (adoptive)
- Religion: Hinduism

Shahu II (Shahu Bhonsle, Marathi pronunciation: [Śāhū Bhoṅsle]; 1763 – 3 May 1808) was the seventh Chhatrapati of the Maratha Confederacy from 1777 until his death in 1808. During his reign, the Marathas won the First Anglo-Maratha War, but lost the Second Anglo-Maratha War. Mahadaji Shinde and the Peshwa were his closest counterparts. He died shortly afterwards.

== Early life and accession to the throne ==
He was the son of Trimbakjiraje Bhosle.He was adopted by Rajaram II of Satara months before his death and after his death, Shahu became Chattrapathi in 1777 and ruled till his death in 1808.
