= Shahu I =

Chhatrapati of the Marathas from 1708 to 1749

- Chhatrapati; Ajatashatru; Emperor
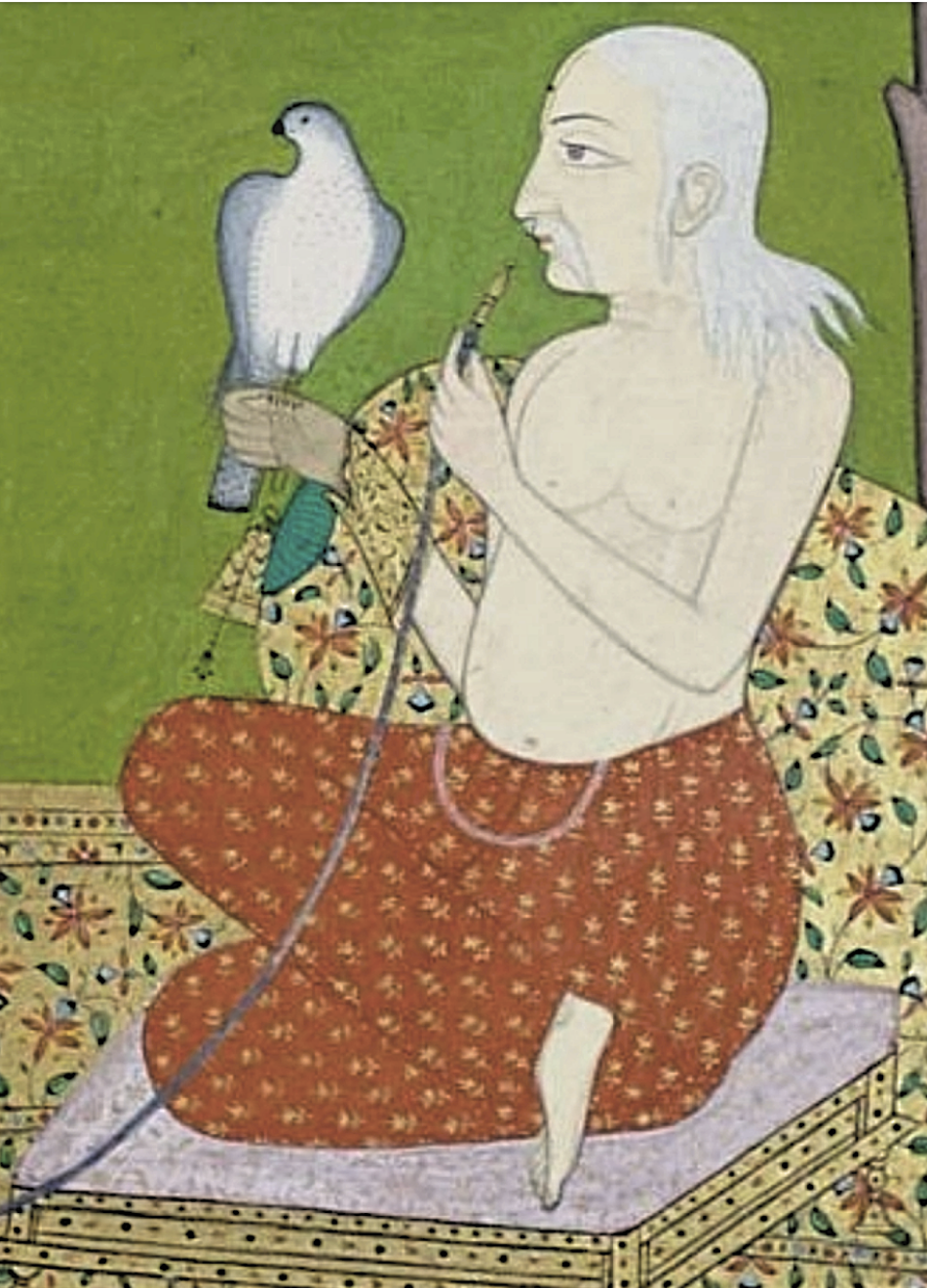
- Shahu I holding a falcon by Shivram Chitari c. 1750

Chhatrapati of the Maratha Empire
- Reign: 12 January 1708 –15 December 1749
- Coronation: 12 January 1708, Satara
- Predecessor: Shivaji II
- Successor: Rajaram II
- Peshwa: Bahiroji Pingale; Balaji Vishwanath; Baji Rao I; Balaji Baji Rao

Subahdar of the Bijapur Subah
- Reign: 23 January 1700–18 May 1707
- Predecessor: Muzaffar Jang Hidayat
- Successor: Position abolished
- Emperor: Aurangzeb; Bahadur Shah I
- Born: 18 May 1682; Gangwali, Bijapur Subah, Mughal Empire
- Died: 15 December 1749 (aged 67); Rangmahal Palace, Satara, Satara Subah, Maratha Empire
- Cause of death: Heart attack
- Burial: 16 December 1749; Sangam Mahuli Fort, Shahpur, Maharashtra, India
- Spouse: Ambikabai II (m. 1700; died 1707) Savitribai Jadhav (m. 1707; died 1719) Sakvarbai Shirke (m. 1709; died 1749) Sagunabai II (m. 1721; died 1748)
- Issue: Yuvraj Sambhajiraje; Fateh Singh I; Rajaram II; Gajrabai; Rajasbai; Parvatibai
Names
- Shahuraje Sambhajiraje Bhosale
- Dynasty: Bhonsle
- Father: Sambhaji I
- Mother: Yesubai
- Religion: Deccan Shaivite Hinduism
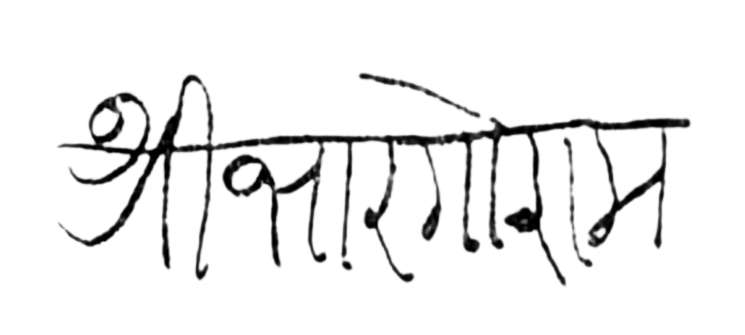
- Signature

Shahu I (Note: Hindustani (Hindi): शाहू प्रथम, Sāhū Prattam; Marathi: शाहू ले प्रथम, Sāhu lē Prtham; 18 May 1682) (18 May 1682 – 15 December 1749) was the fifth Chhatrapati of Maratha Empire from 1708 to 1749, the longest reign among the Maratha rulers. He was also the last subahdar of the Bijapur Subah, before being annexed by the Maratha Empire. During Shahu's reign, driven largely by the strategic vision and military leadership of his Peshwas, the Maratha Empire expanded across much of the Indian subcontinent and emerged as the leading power in South Asia.

Shahu, his father Sambhaji I and his grandfather Shivaji Maharaj, all belonged to the Bhonsle dynasty. He, along with his mother Yesubai Bhonsle, was under the capture of Aurangzeb during the Deccan Wars. For nearly 18 years, Shahu was under captive but was treated with royal courtesy and he was often involved in Mughal politics. By 1707, Shahu was released by Aurangzeb's son Bahadur Shah I, in order to strengthen Mughal relations with the Marathas. Shahu held military and administrative posts during his captive days in the Mughal Empire eventually becoming the governor of the Bijapur Subah. Shahu succeeded his cousin Shivaji II by 1708 at the age of 26, shortly after Aurangzeb's death and his release. Then, Shahu launched military campaigns on the regions of Khed, Adilabad, Konkan, Bengal, Bihar and western Indian subcontinent. He also successfully brought them under control of the Marathas, with the exception of Bengal which was only partly incorporated into the empire. One of his most successful and famous campaigns were during at the Afsharid invasion of India in which the Afsharid Empire, under the rule of Nader Shah, occupied Delhi and the remaining western territories of an insignificant Mughal Empire. Marathas, under the rule of Shahu, helped the Mughals against the Persian Afsharid dynasty. By 1740, the combined forces of the Marathas and Mughals and other smaller regional powers defeated the Persians in the subcontinent and thereby, forcing Nader Shah's huge army to retreat from Lahore and western Indian subcontinent (Afghanistan, Khyber Pakhtunkhwa, Pakistan and Punjab) and ceded all their territories in India to the Marathas. Thus, the Maratha Empire eventually captured Delhi and became the sole dominant power in South Asia, replacing the Mughals which had been the dominant power in the region for over three centuries, and making them puppets of the Marathas.

Shahu also introduced Mughal and western-styled form of administration into the Maratha Empire. He divided his empire into subahs (provinces), a system which was introduced by Akbar in the Mughal Empire. During Shahu's reign, the central authority of the empire became much stronger and the empire was highly centralized, with the Chhatrapati being the head of the state. Shahu was a great patron of many Indian languages, such as Marathi, Hindustani, Persian, Sanskrit, Prakrit and Tamil. He also made Hindustani as the dominant language in the empire's court, alongside his dynastic language, Marathi. He also issued coins in Persian, Prakrit, Sanskrit and French languages. The empire, under Shahu, started making trade contacts and strong relations with powers outside South Asia such as Britain, France, Iran and others. Because of all these reforms, he is called as Maharaj e-Hind (مهاراجِ هند) or Padishah e-Hind (پادشاه هند) (Note: This title was previously used by the Mughal emperors, mainly Babur, Akbar and Aurangzeb) in Persian and Hindustani languages, making him the only Maratha emperor to carry these titles.

Shahu died in 1749 at the age of 67, due to a sudden heart attack and was succeeded by his son, Rajaram II. Some historians often claims that the decline of the Maratha Empire took place after his death but these citations are often dismissed as the empire still continued to be an effective power in Asia during the reign of Rajaram II. However, Shahu's death was a significant blow to the empire. After his death, the power was passed into the hands of the Peshwa and the Chhatrapati was reduced to a figurehead. The central authority grew weaker and the Maratha Empire was decentralized into several houses of powers such as Holkars in Indore and Delhi, Scindias in Gwalior and Sind and Gaekwads in Baroda and Bhopal, which were ruled by the Peshwa and the Ashta Pradhan.

== Early life ==
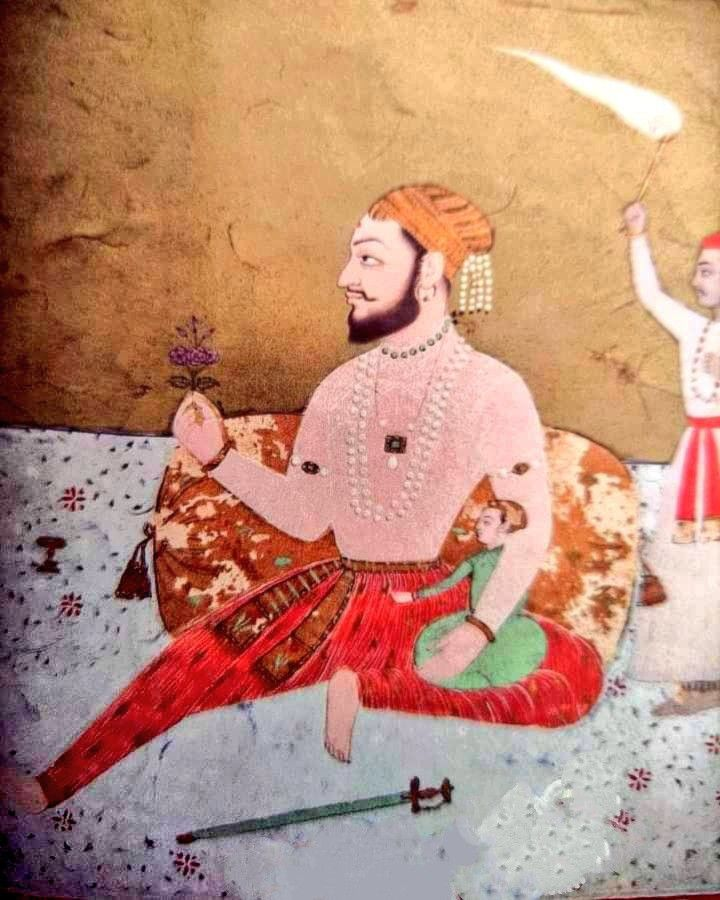
Chhatrapati Sambhaji with Prince Shahu c. 1685

In 1689, at the age of seven, Shahu was taken prisoner along with his mother by the Mughals after the Battle of Raigarh. Aurangzeb was fighting the decentralised Marathas and hoped to use the crown heir Shahu as a pawn in his battle. Therefore, he treated Shahu and his mother well. Even in Mughal captivity, Shahu's mother, Queen Yesubai, continued to rule her private territories as a Deshmukh. Aurangzeb regarded Shahu, whose real name was Shivaji as 'Sav or Sadhu Shivaji' in contrast to his grandfather Shivaji I, resulting in his popular title 'Raja Shahu' meaning Honest or Saint King.

Shahu was married to two daughters of high ranking Maratha Sardars in the Mughal service. Aurangzeb gifted Shahu the Bhavani sword of Shivaji, the sword of Afzal Khan, and another gold-hilted sword. Aurangzeb also granted him Sanads to lands and revenue rights around the Parganas of Akkalkot, Supa, Baramati, and Nevase for his maintenance. After Aurangzeb's death in 1707, one of his sons, Prince Azam Shah, released Shahu in the hope of starting an internecine conflict among the Marathas, and also to have Shahu on his side for his own succession battle for the Mughal throne. At that time, his aunt Tarabai, who governed the Maratha realm in the name of her son (also named Shivaji), denounced Shahu as an impostor substituted by the Mughals for the son of Sambhaji. Shahu then waged a civil war against Tarabai to gain the Chhatrapati's throne in 1708 and emerged victorious.

== Ancestry ==
Ancestors of Shahu I

8.Shahaji
4.Shivaji I
9. Jijabai
2. Sambhaji
10. Mudhoji Rao Naik Nimbalkar
5.Sai Bhonsale
11. Reubai
1. Shahu I
6. Pilajirao Shirke
3. Yesubai Bhonsale

== Accession ==
=== Early reign ===
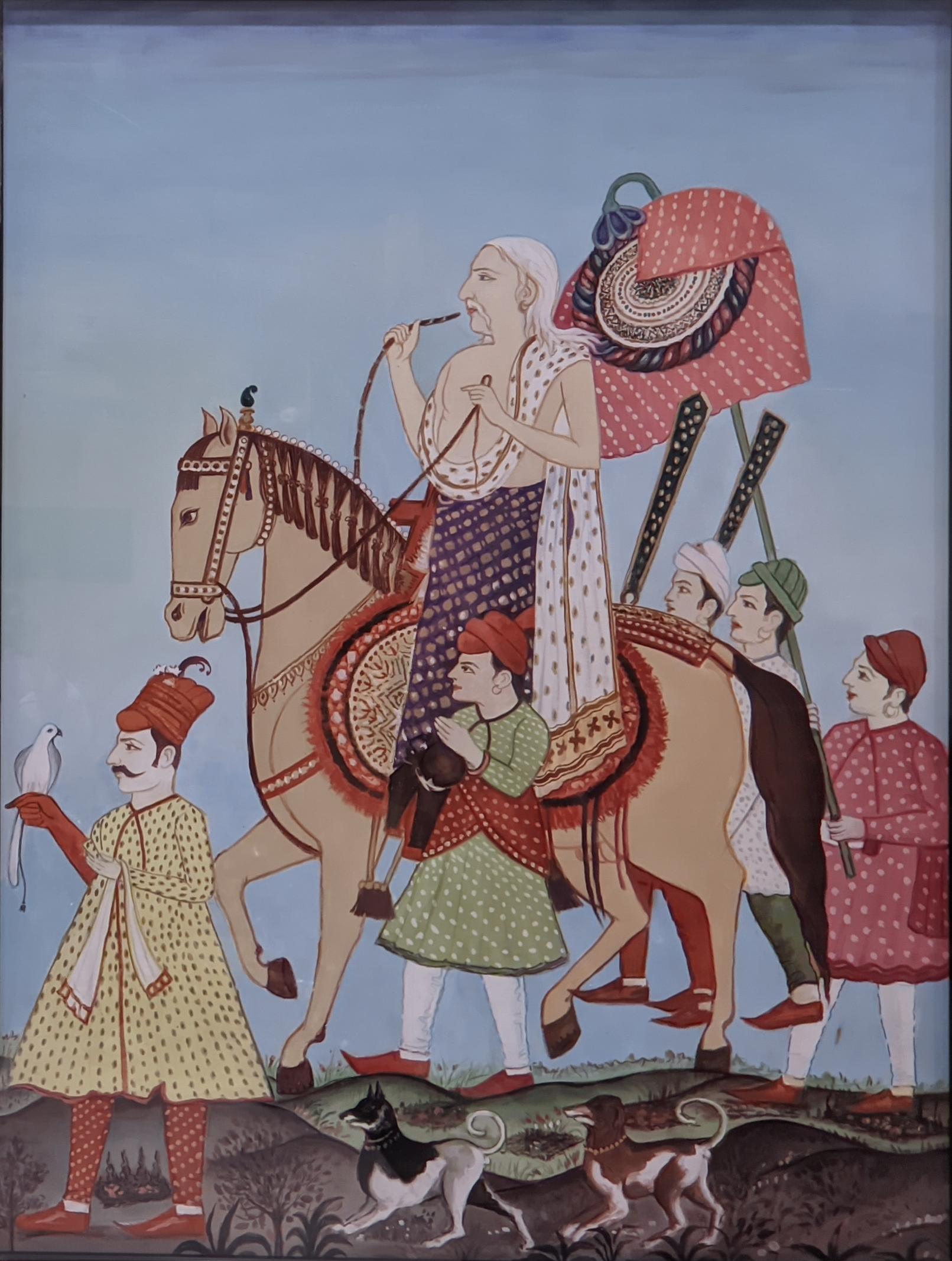
Painting of Shahu I with his imperial guards, c. 18th century

Following the death of Aurangzeb, Shahu grew impatient about returning to his homeland. He was advised by princess Zinat-un-Nissa (Aurangzeb's daughter) and Zulfiqar Khan to not wait for formal sanads of appointment from Azam Shah, but to quit the Mughal camp at once and proceed to his home country. He readily acted upon this advice and left the Mughal camp at Doraha on 8 May 1707. The rulers of Bharatpur, Jaipur, Jodhpur and Udaipur received Shahu on his way to Pune with warm hospitality. Shahu visited the sacred city of Ujjain and paid his obeisance to Shri Mahakaleshwar. At Burhanpur, Jotyaji Kaskar was left behind by Shahu to receive the sanads from the Mughals. Shahu then arrived at Bijagad, about thirty miles south of Narmada, and was joined by its ruler Rawal Mohansinh, who had long rebelled against Aurangzeb and cooperated with the Marathas. Mohansinh was the first to espouse the cause of Shahu and help him with troops and funds. From Bijagad, Shahu proceeded to Sultanpur, where he was joined by several Maratha chiefs such as Amritrao Kadambande, Rawal Sujansinh of Lamkani, the Bokils, the Purandares and other Brahmin families.

== Kolhapur succession ==
=== Early conflicts ===
After reaching Maharashtra, Senasahibsubha Parsoji Bhonsle, commander of 15,000 troops, pledged himself to Shahu. Parsoji’s example was quickly followed by Sardar Nimaji Shinde, Sarlashkar Haibatrao Nimbalkar, Rustamrao Jadhavrao (Shahu’s father-in-law), Sekhoji Thorat and Chimnaji Damodar who were all operating in Baglana, Khandesh and Nashik region. The forces of Tarabai assembled near Kudas Khed for a confrontation.

On 3 August 1707, Jotyaji Kesarkar received the formal sanads for Raja Shahu at Burhanpur from the new Mughal emperor, Bahadur Shah, who had got the throne by killing his half-brother and rival, emperor Azam Shah in the Battle of Jajau. While Bahadur Shah granted Marathas sardeshmukhi of the Deccan, he failed to grant them chauth and thus to satisfy them fully. He also did not recognise Shahu as the rightful Maratha Chhatrapati. He thus let Tara Bai and Shahu fight for supremacy over the Maratha Kingdom. The Battle of Khed would be a major development in the ensuing civil war.

== Battle of Khed ==
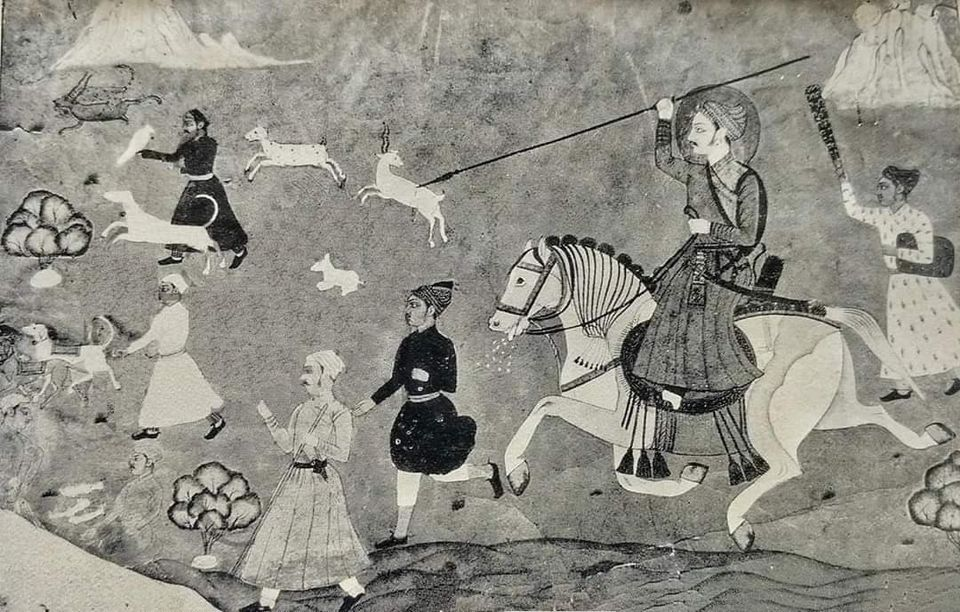
Chhatrapati Shahu I on horseback

On his march from Pune to the field of Khed Kudus, Shahu faced resistance from the town of Parad(village in Jalna district), which had a small fortress from which a feeble cannonade was directed upon his forces by the Patil Sayaji Lokhande. The fortress was stormed and levelled to the ground, and the besieged were put to the sword. The Patil Sayaji's widow placed her son Ranoji in Shahu's palanquin. Shahu, who regarded this as his first victory, named the boy Fatesinh and adopted him as his own son. Upon reaching Khed, Shahu sneaked into Dhanaji Jadhav's camp in disguise and had an interview with Dhanaji's comptroller Naroram Ranga Rao, who held favour of his master. Naroram represented the legitimacy of Shahu's claims to the Maratha throne and persuaded Dhanaji to espouse the right cause at the right time. Thereafter, Dhanaji also pledged his allegiance to Shahu. The Battle of Khed then took place on 12 October 1707 between the forces of Tarabai and Raja Shahu, who personally commanded his contingents. Tarabai's forces were led by Pratinidhi Parshuram Trymbak and Sarsenapati Khanderao Dabhade and suffered major casualties, while Dhanaji Jadhav only engaged in nominal skirmishes due to his prior oath of allegiance to Shahu. Shahu thus achieved a resounding victory causing Parshuram Trymbak Pratinidhi to flee to Satara Fort. Following the battle, Shahu visited the Khandoba Temple at Jejuri to pay homage and assumed the title "Kshatriyakulavatansa Sriyut Raja Shahu Chhatrapati".

Shahu, riding on a wave of success, went on to capture Raigad, Torna, Vichitragad, and Chandan-Vandan forts, along with a few minor ones, in record time. Within a month of the Battle of Khed, he then appeared before Satara. Camped at the foot of Satara Fort, in almost the exact place where Aurangzeb had camped seven years earlier, Shahu sent off a peremptory demand to Tarabai's Pratinidhi to surrender the fort without resistance. However, since the latter would not yield, Shahu laid siege to it. Determined to conquer it in eight days, Shahu discovered that the military commander (Havaldar) of the fort, Sheikh Mira, had kept his family in Wai, a village not far from his camp. Shahu decided to apply a judicious ploy and threatened Sheikh Mira, saying that he would blow off the Sheikh's wife and children from the mouth of cannons if he did not surrender the fortress. Sheikh Mira then showed his readiness to do the bidding of Shahu. However, since the Pratinidhi resisted, Sheikh Mira, in a minor coup, threw him into prison and opened the gates to Shahu on 1 January 1708. It is said that even Dhanaji Jadhav, who had seen Aurangzeb’s vast army battering the fort of Satara for nine months before it capitulated, is said to have expressed surprise at the ease and rapidity with which Shahu managed to conquer it. Satara thus became the capital of Shahu's realms.

== Expansion ==
=== Consolidation ===
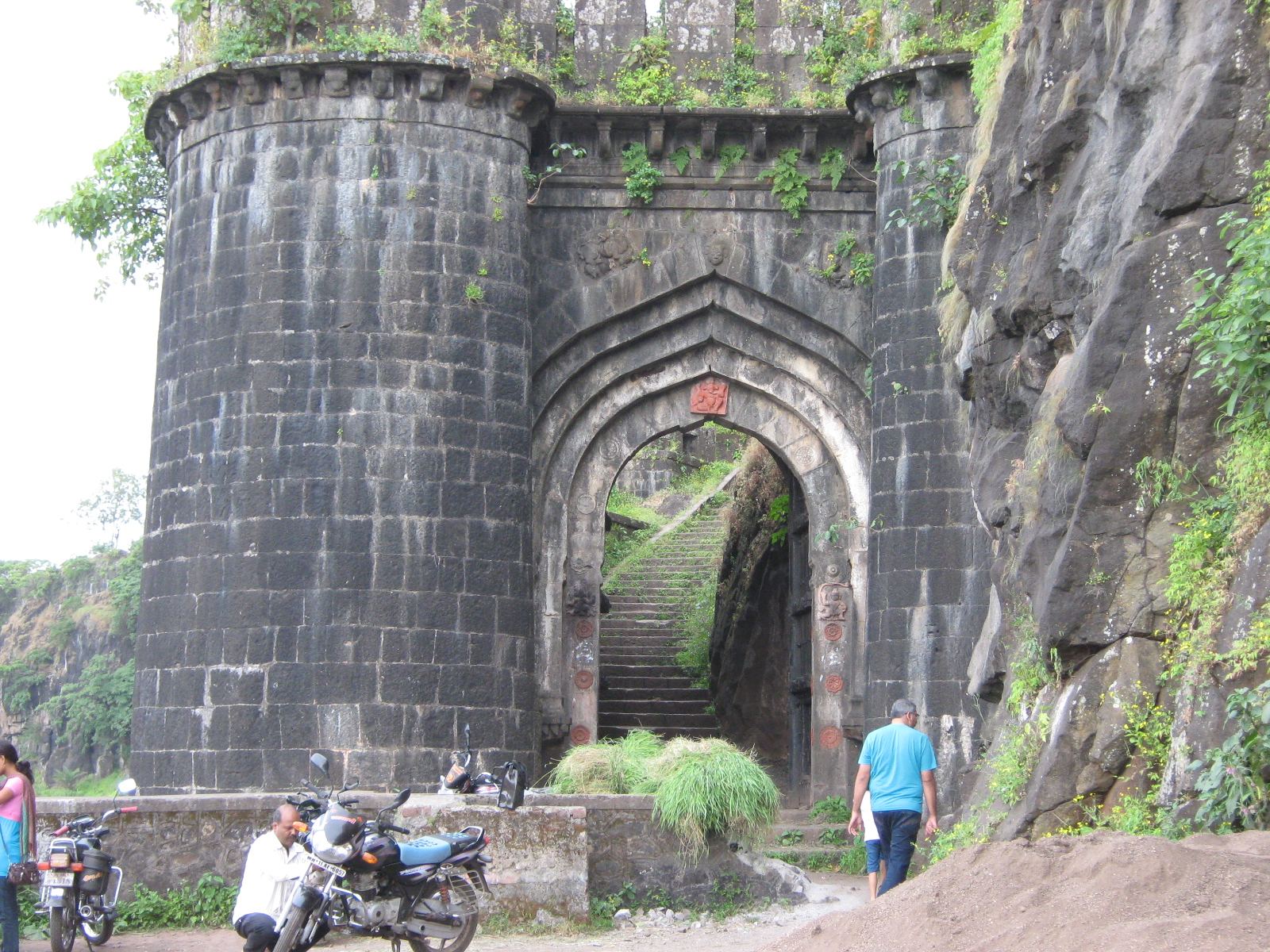
Entrance of the Ajinkyatara Fort

Kanhoji Angre seized the opportunity of warring between Tarabai and Shahu to effectively free himself of the suzerainty of either. Instead, he captured the major trading centre of Kalyan, and the neighbouring forts of Rajmachi and Lohagad. Shahu sent a large force under his Peshwa, or Prime Minister, Bahiroji Pingale. Kanhoji defeated Pingale, imprisoned him at Lohagad, and started to advance towards Shahu's capital of Satara. Shahu commanded his Senakarta Balaji Vishwanath to raise another standing army (Huzurat) to subdue opponents. Balaji preferred the path of negotiation and was appointed as Shahu's plenipotentiary to negotiate with the admiral. Balaji and Kanhoji met at Lonavala. The newly appointed Peshwa appealed to the old sailor's patriotism for the Maratha cause. Kanhoji Angre agreed to become the Sarkhel (grand admiral) of Shahu's navy with control of the Konkan. Balaji and Kanhoji then jointly attacked the Muslim Siddis of Janjira. Their combined contingents captured most of the Konkan coast, including Balaji's birthplace of Shrivardhan, which then became part of the Angre fiefdom. Delighted with Balaji's success, Shahu dismissed Bahiroji Pingale, and appointed Balaji Vishwanath as Peshwa on 16 November 1713.

Upon the death of Athani's Maratha lord Himmat Bahadur Vithoji Chavan, his son Udaji Chavan succeeded to his fief and his title of Himmat Bahadur. During the Maratha-Mughal Wars, Udaji's father had been a close friend of Ramchandra Amatya, and Udaji had joined the faction of Tarabai (and thereby of her son Sambhaji). From his castle at Battis Shirale, Udaji frequently mounted raids in Shahu's territories, terming the exactions as the "Chavan Chauth". In the 1730s, after the death of Senapati Trymbakrao Dabhade and Bajirao's distant campaigns, Udaji Chavan obtained sanction from Tarabai's son Sambhaji to lead a force across the Warana river against Shahu. He pitched his camp at Shirol and began to plunder the countryside. Shahu, who was hunting in the neighborhood, sent for Udaji Chavan, promising him a safe conduct. After receiving bitter chiding by Shahu for his actions, Udaji Chavan decided to having him assassinated. A few days later, four assassins entered Shahu's tent, who was seated alone. Shahu was so indifferent to the danger posed by the assassins that the assassins lost heart and threw down their guns at his feet, pleading for mercy. Shahu enquired about their employer and they admitted that they had been sent by Udaji Chavan. Shahu gave each of the assassins a gold bracelet, and made them pick up their arms and take them back to Udaji along with a certificate from himself that stated they were good and faithful servants while deciding to mount up the conflict against Sambhaji. Shambhusimha Jadhav and Pratinidhi launched a rapid assault on Sambhaji's camp at Warana riverbanks and wiped out most of the Kolhapur army. All of Sambhaji’s military chest and stores were captured by the Pratinidhi. Tarabai, Rajasbai, Sambhaji’s wife Jijabai, Bhagwantrao Ramchandra, and Vyankatrao Joshi were taken as prisoners to Chhatrapati Shahu who chivalrously sent Sambhaji’s mother and wife to Panhala. The dispirited Tarabai chose to reside with Shahu in the palace prepared for her at Satara, concluding her role in the civil war. Shahu's forces took Vishalgad next, compelling Sambhaji to agree to a conclusive treaty.

An open field known as the Jakhinwadi plain was chosen as the meeting place of the two cousins. Jakhinwadi was bedecked with pavilions and equipage of the nobles of Maharashtra, who on this occasion, vied with each other in the splendour of their trappings and the profusion of their jewelry. There were over 200,000 soldiers, alone with horses and countless baggage trains. On the appointed day, Shahu and Sambhaji set out from their respective camps on elephants with jewel-studded howdahs. When they came in sight of each other, their elephants kneeled and their riders left them to mount richly saddled Arab steeds. When the horses met, the two princes alighted. Sambhaji put his head on Shahu’s feet as a visible token of submission. Chhatrapati Shahu bent down and lifting up his cousin and embraced him. Then, Shahu and Sambhaji decked each other with golden coins and garlands of flowers bringing the ceremony to a close. The formal treaty was concluded two months later at Satara known as "Treaty of Warana", which terminated the Maratha Civil War, and made Kolhapur a firmly subordinate sector of Satara Chhatrapati's realm. Fatehsingh Bhonsle was ordered to escort Sambhaji back to Panhala. Shahu accompanied Sambhaji for eight miles, and the path was set ablaze with the jewels and silks of the Maratha nobles in the train of the two monarchs. According to scholar C. A. Kincaid: "Even the splendours of the French nobles, when Henry met Francis on the Field of the Cloth of Gold, would have paled before the magnificence of Sambhaji’s reception by Shahu."

=== Reign of Chhatrapati Shahu ===
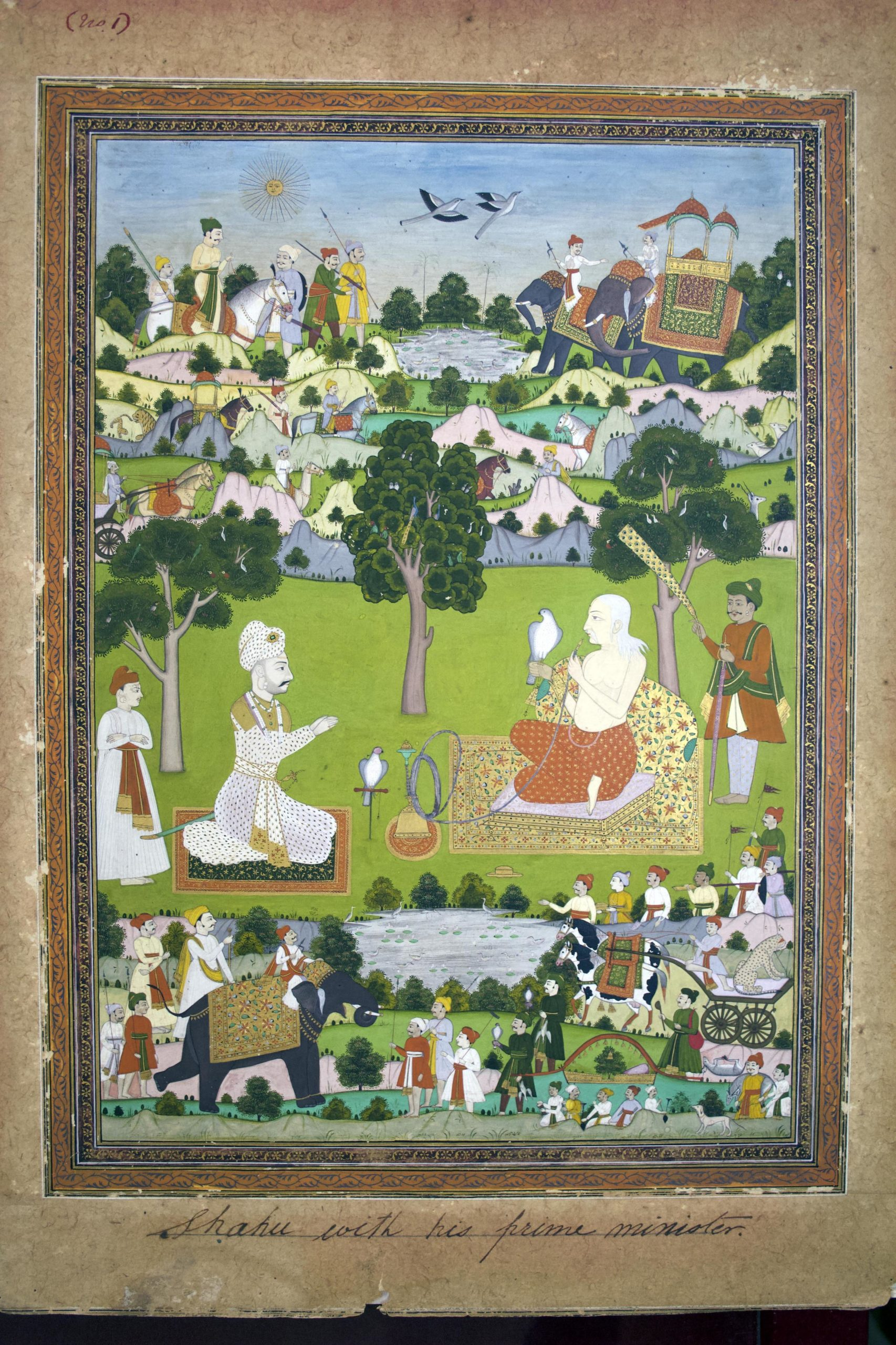
Shahu I accompanied by his Peshwa Balaji Bajirao by Shivram Chitari c. 1750

Over the next fifty years, Peshwa Balaji's son, Bajirao I, and grandson, Balaji Bajirao, expanded Maratha power in all directions of the Indian subcontinent on the order of Chatrapati Shahu I. The Battle of Palkhed was fought on 28 February 1728 at the village of Palkhed, near Nashik, Maharashtra, India, between the Maratha Empire and the Nizam-ul-Mulk, Asaf Jah I of Hyderabad, wherein the Marathas defeated the Nizam. After the Battle of Bundelkhand, the Marathas became major players in the Ganga-Yamuna Doab. During Shahu's lifetime, Marathas conquered Bundelkhand, Bundi, Malwa, Gujarat, Gwalior, Kota, and the Ganga-Yamuna Doab.

Shahu advanced the interests of the ryots and brought barren tracts under cultivation, encouraged the plantation of trees, and relieved the suffering of the poor classes by abolishing irksome taxes.

Shahu, widely regarded as "Bhola Shankar" (benevolent incarnation of Shiva), was reputed for his proverbial equitable disposition, and freely socialised with civilians. During festivals, celebrations, dinners, and marriage ceremonies, Shahu was famous for taking an active role and observing how his people fared. People across all classes felt entitled to invite him for their intimate life events like marriages or other celebrations, and he heartily joined them, spent for them, and aided them whenever help was needed. Shahu was titled "Punyashloke" (of pious legacy) by more than one contemporary writer. He was extolled for appointing qualified officers and delegating due authority while also censuring misdeeds appropriately. He appeared in public dressed in the same plain white garments as in private life, with long grey hairs which hung down gracefully on his shoulders. There was virtually nothing private about his life and he was approachable for any civilian. He travelled around his kingdom on horseback, or his palanquin with a slender retinue, with his secretary and clerks always accompanying him.

His daily routine was a permanent fixture. The poor had free access to him and received quick and impartial justice. He never disregarded any impromptu lowest-class applicants, and on his tours, he stopped his palanquin whenever he saw anyone appealing to him. As a rule, Shahu went out hunting every morning, which was his only exercise and mode of recreation. Breakfast was followed by office work, where the Chhatrapati carefully disposed of every matter that came before him, and patiently heard every petition that was submitted. At the lighting time in the evening, a full Court was held, after formal obeisance had first been made to Agni. Music and dancing concluded the day. It was computed that Chhatrapati Shahu passed orders on at least 500 matters or cases every day.

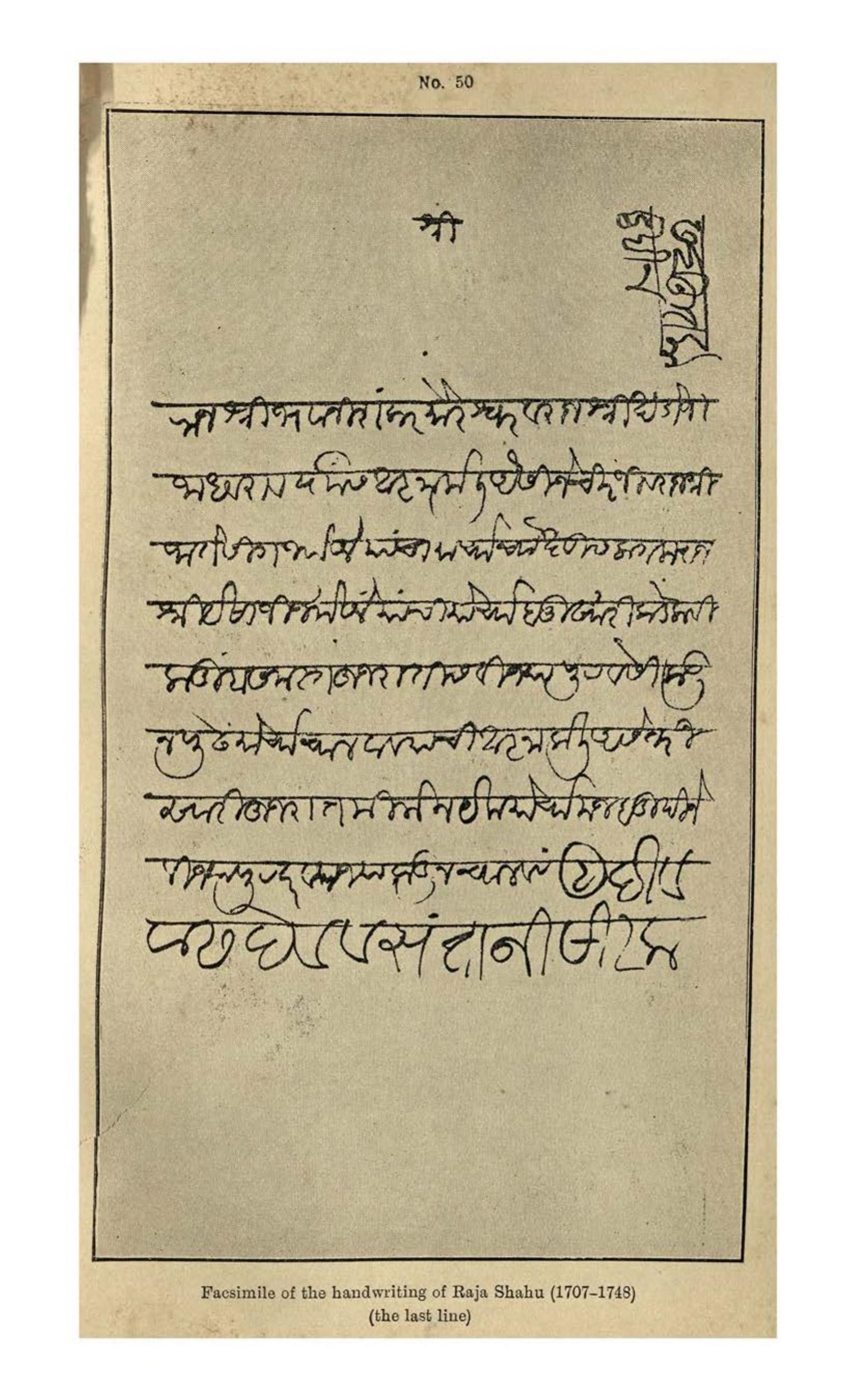
Letter of Shahu I written after the Siege of Bhupalgad. Shahu enjoins Bhavani Shankar and Khandoji Jadhavrao to lead a determined assault on the side of the Bijapur gate, the Chaukadi, and the Bukhari sides having been attacked by Fatehsingh and Yesaji Bhonsle respectively. c. 1738-39

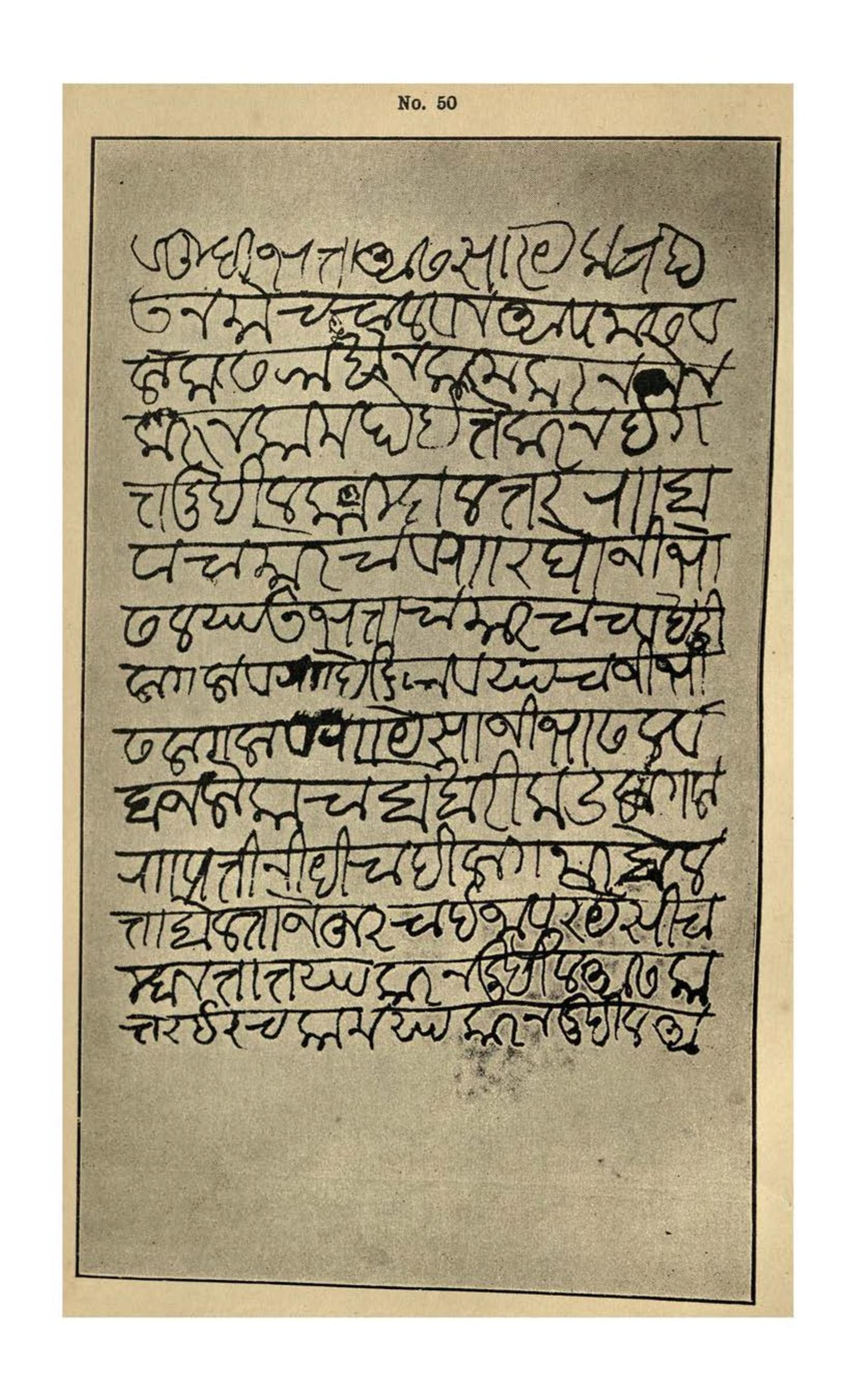
Siege of Bhupalgad letter

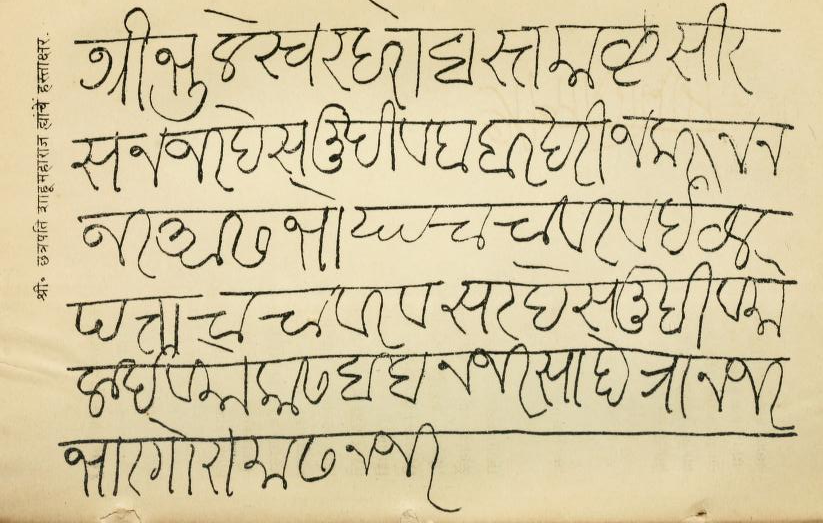
Handwriting of Chhatrapati Shahu I

== Family ==
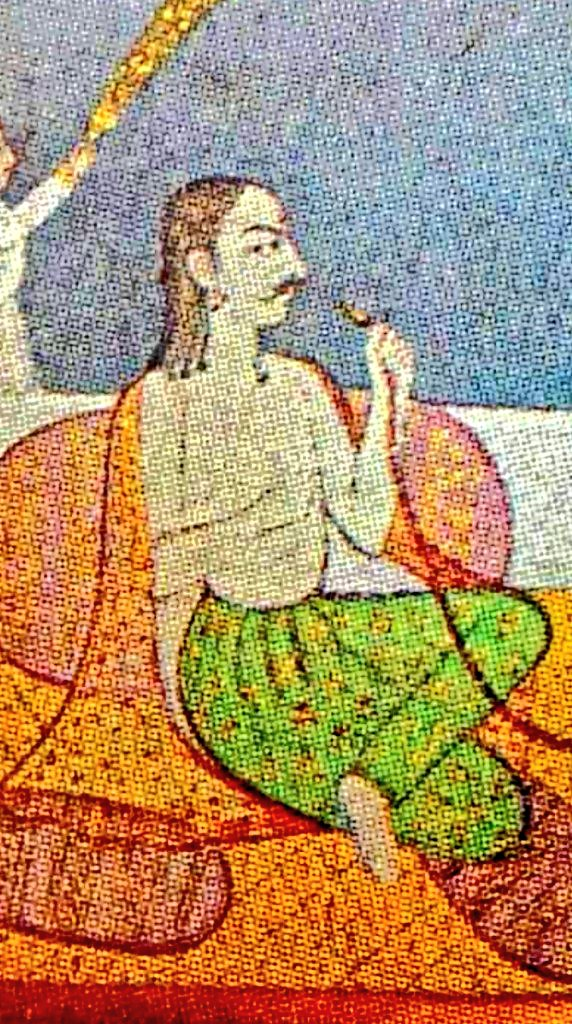
Portrait of Shahu c. 1719

Shahu had four wives, two sons, and four daughters.

His Shirke queens, Sakwarbai and Sagunabai, owned their own residences called 'Dareemi Mahal' and 'Dhakta Mahal', respectively. They had their own 'Chitnis/Chitnavis' ministers to look after their establishments. They derived their income from the 'watans', certain privileges and trade revenue being carried on in ports of Colaba district called 'Khadi of Kundalika'. They had also received 'Sanads' from the Chhatrapati to carry on the trade in different precious commodities such as fish, salt, rice, spices, and cocoa-nuts to and from their tax-free ports of Roha and Ashtami. Disturbances, attacks, and onslaughts by Abyssinians, Europeans were frequent. The queens were often requested to check the nefarious activities of many upstarts with military support. Accounts reveal that the queens were well informed of the events taking place on the Western Indian coast, and that they maintained close contact with influential Maratha Sardars and other figures like Brahmendra Swami to maintain their hold over the political situation of Konkan sphere.

Shahu adopted Parvati Kolhatkar when she was 3 years old. She was the daughter of a Konkanastha Brahmin mamledar of Pen, Raigad. He trained her in warfare and administration. He later had her married to Sadashivrao Bhau when she was 15 years old. Even though her father was alive, he performed her kanyadan. He also adopted two sons, Ranoji Lokhande who was renamed Fatehsinh I, and Rajaram II of Satara (who succeeded him as Ramaraja Chhatrapati). Rajaram II had been brought to him by Shahu's paternal aunt, Tarabai, who initially claimed that the young man was her grandson and thus a descendant of Shivaji, but later disowned him as an imposter when he would not be a pawn for her politics. Ultimately, she admitted to his legitimacy in the presence of other Maratha Sardars. Due to the controversy of this event, after Shahu's death, Tarabai vengefully arrested Ramaraja Chhatrapati to take over Satara court. Thus, the executive powers were indirectly legitimised with the Pune-based Peshwa Balaji Bajirao.

Shahu had adopted Ranoji Lokhande, later known as Fatehsinh I Raje Sahib Bhonsle, the son of Meherban Sayaji Lokhande, the Patil of Parad Budruk(village in Jalna District now). Sayaji Patil had died in Chhatrapati Shahu's sack of Parad during the Maratha civil war, and his mother handed him over to Shahu who was seated on his palanquin. Fatehsinh thus became the first Raja of Akkalkot around the year 1708. Upon his adoption, Fatehsinh received the town of Akkalkot and surrounding areas. The descendants of Fatehsinh later went on to establish the Lokhande Bhonsle dynasty in Akkalkot state of Maharashtra.

== Legacy, death and succession ==
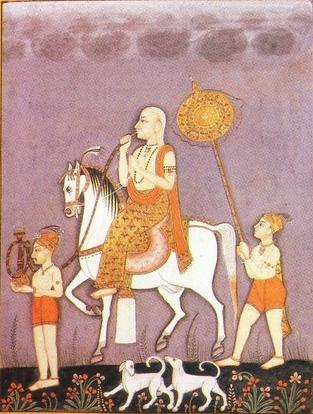
Shahu I riding a horse

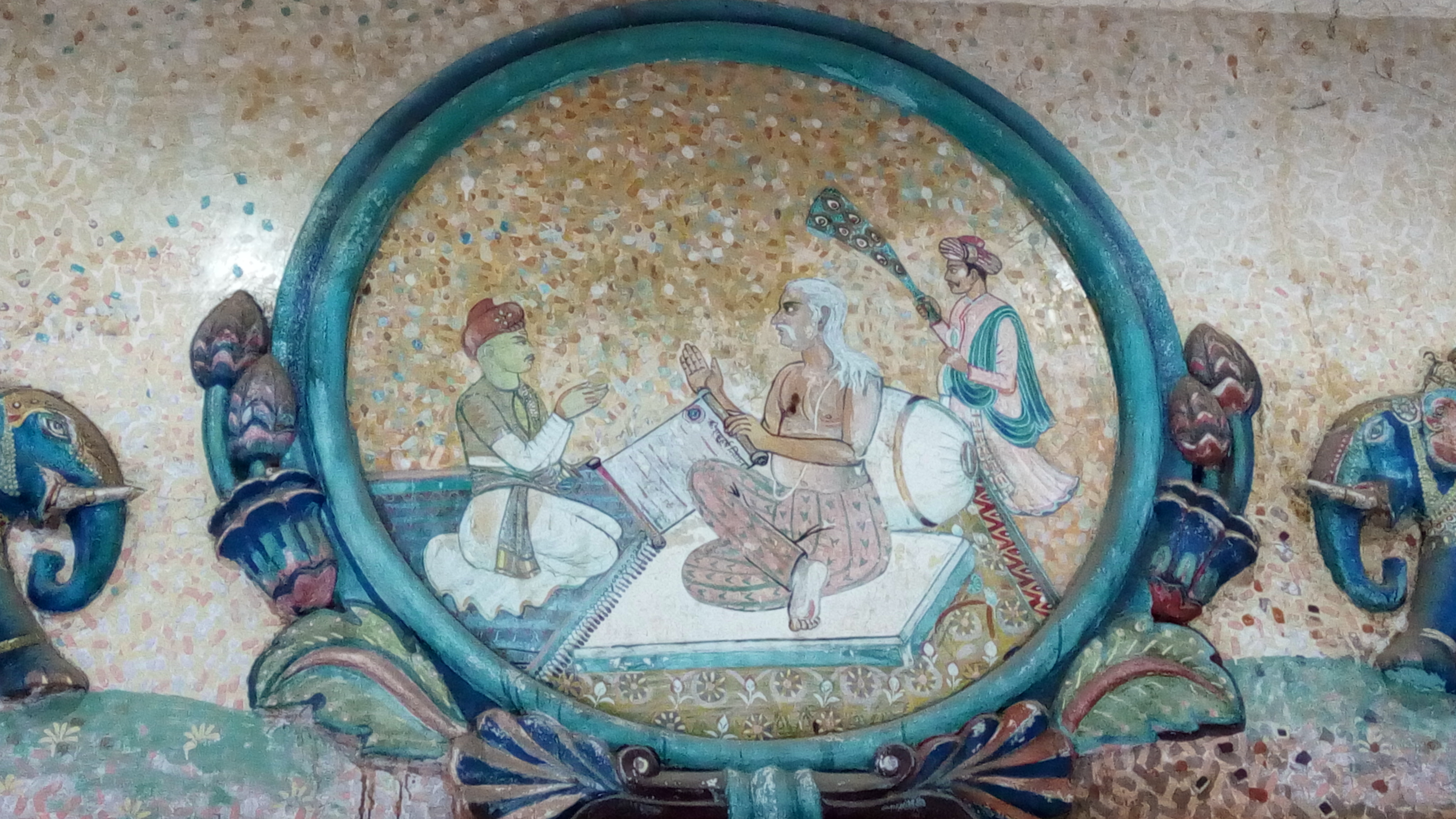
Chhatrapati Shahu I issuing orders to Peshwa Balaji Bajirao

Satara (Sapta Tara) was the name of the citadel, while the capital city below the fort was actually named Shahunagar. Shahu shifted his throne from the citadel to the city's Rangmahal Palace in 1721. He supplied the new city with good drinking water brought in pipes from the Mahadara and Yavteshvar hills. There was also a mint established in the city.

Shahu was fond of sports such as hunting wild game and shooting birds, and used to have a daily ride outside Satara into the jungles for this purpose, thereby getting both fresh air and exercise. During the monsoon season this was accompanied by fishing. Shahu patronised singers, instrument-players, bards, and actors. He kept well-trained hounds and was particular about their pedigree. He was equally fond of well bred horses and birds, and knew their qualities and features. Rarities of various kinds such as candles, scents, knives, swords, tobacco, gunpowder used to be ordered by him through his admiral Kanhoji Angre from European traders. He also purchased elephant tusks. He was equally fond of good gardens, and ordered the planting of rare fruit and flower trees imported from different places.

Chhatrapati Shahu died on 15 December 1749 in Shahunagar. In his records after Shahu's death, Malhar Chitnis states, "He was a father and protector to young and old, to man and woman, to nobles and servants, great and small. Such a King never lived before. Under his government even criminals were not harshly treated. He had no enemy. Unprecedented lamentations were heard."

A statue of Chhatrapati Shahu was erected over his cremation spot.

Many stories were told of Shahu's lavish generosity, and his court would compare him with Karna, a character of the Indian epic Mahabharata.

Muzaffar Jang, Nizam-ul-Mulk's grandson, is recorded to have spoken the following eulogy when he heard of Shahu's death. "Shahu at the Maratha Court, and Nizam-ul-mulk at the Mughal Court, are the only two great men, the like of whom is hardly to be met with. He carefully looked after the interests of his State: There has been no equal to him. He rightly deserves the title of "enemy-less" (Ajatashatru). By selecting right men for right duties Shahu increased the valour of his soldiers and giving them ample field for expansion, extended the Maratha dominions in all quarters of India, thus fulfilling the ardent wishes of his grandfather Shivaji. One peculiar trait of Shahu's character was that he felt the highest pleasure in making others happy, not only his dependents and subjects, but even aliens in race, religion and rule. Himself living a plain frugal ascetic's life, he felt highly rejoiced in seeing people enjoying their various trades and avocations. Indeed he could be called a saint in this respect. Even when faced with murderers that came to attack him, he let them go unpunished and thus created a genuine feeling of reverence for his personality in the minds of the public."

At that time of his death, his widow Sakvarbai and his concubines committed sati because of political intrigues between Tarabai and Peshwa Balaji Baji Rao regarding succession at the Satara court. His adopted son Rajaram II of Satara, claimed by Tarabai to be her grandson, succeeded the Satara throne. However, actual power was held first by Tarabai, and then by Peshwa Balaji Baji Rao.

== See also ==
- List of battles involving the Maratha Empire

== Bibliography ==
- Mehta, Jaswant Lal (2005). Advanced Study in the History of Modern India 1707–1813. Sterling Publishers. ISBN 9781932705546.

Preceded by Shivaji II	Chhatrapati of the Maratha Confederacy; 1707–1749	Succeeded by Rajaram II of Satara
