= Gondhali =

Community in Maharashtra, India

Gondhali is a community in Maharashtra, India. Their occupation is to sing songs of the Goddesses and Gods of Maharashtra preaching them for mythogical reasons like mannat or kasam after accomplishment. Their songs are usually the mythological stories of their Gods. They use sambal, a set of drums tied to their neck and rested on their thighs to bring rhythm to their songs.

This singing and dancing in front of the God is called Gondhal and people who do Gondhal are called Gondhali.
