= Chhatrapati =

Indian royal title

Chhatrapati is a royal title from Sanskrit used to denote a king. The word "Chhatrapati" is a Sanskrit language compound word of chhatra (parasol or umbrella) and pati (master/lord/ruler).

== Usage examples ==
Sangita Raga-Kalpa-druma (1842) by Krishnananda Vyasa contains dhrupad lyrics in which Tansen addresses Man Singh Tomar (r. c. 1486-1516), the ruler of Gwalior, as a Chhatrapati: "छत्रपति मान राजा, तुम चिरंजीव रहौ जौलो ध्रुव मेरू तारो".

The 1644 CE Rajsitapur inscription, issued by Amarasimha I of Jhalavad, uses the epithet Chhatrapati for the Mughal emperor Shahjahan.

The Maratha ruler Shivaji adopted the title Chhatrapati at the time of his coronation in 1674. His descendants - the members of the House of Bhonsle - also used the title, as the rulers of the Maratha Confederacy and the princely states of Satara and Kolhapur.

== See also ==
- List of Maratha rulers
- House of Bhonsle
- Maratha Empire
- Maratha
- Maratha titles
