= Kolhapur State =

Maratha princely state of India (1710–1949)

Coordinates: 16°41′N 74°14′E

State of Kolhapur
- 1710–1949
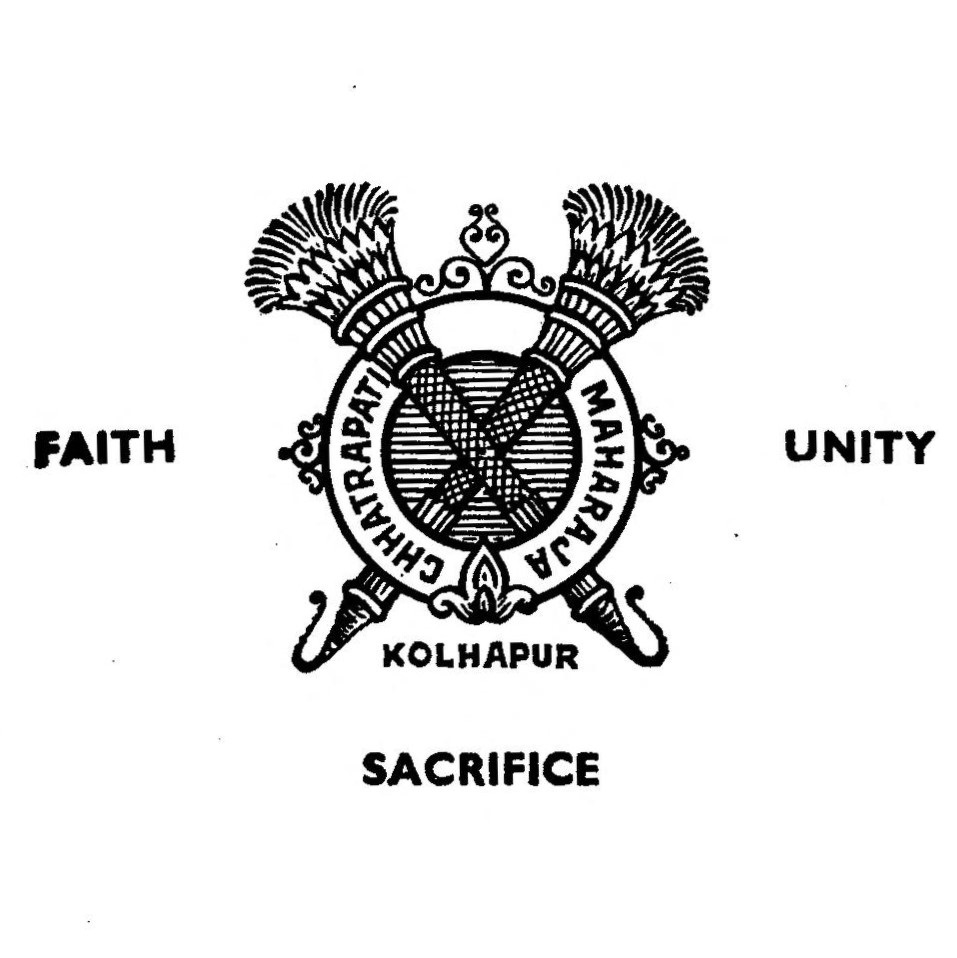
- Flag State Emblem

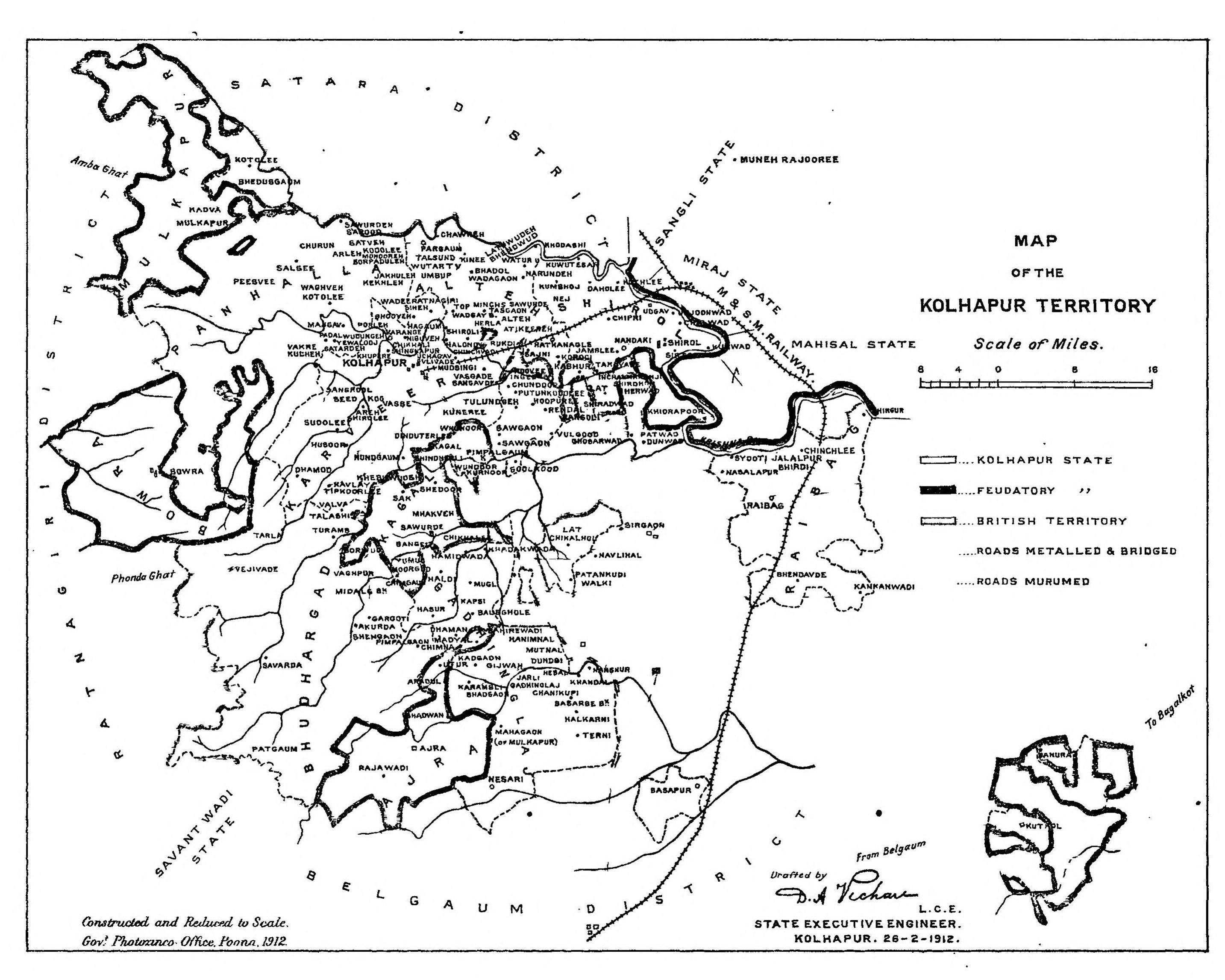
- Kolhapur State Map, 1912
- Status: Principality within the Maratha Confederacy (1707–1818); Protectorate of the East India Company (1818–1857); Princely State of the British Raj (1857–1947); State of the Dominion of India (1947–1949)
- Capital: Kolhapur
- Raja/Maharaja
  - 1710–1714 (first): Shivaji II
  - 1947–1949 (last): Shahaji II
- History
  - Established: 1710
  - Acceded to Dominion of India: 1947
  - Merged into Bombay State: 1949

Area
- 1901: 8,332 km^{2} (3,217 sq mi)

Population
  - 1901: 865,000
Preceded by	Succeeded by
Maratha Confederacy	India
- Today part of: Maharashtra, India

The Kolhapur State was a Maratha princely state in the Deccan region of India, under the Kolhapur and Southern Maratha Agency and later the Deccan States Agency. It was considered the most important of the Maratha principalities with the others being Baroda State, Gwalior State and Indore State. Its rulers, of the Bhonsle dynasty, were entitled to a 19-gun salute. The state flag was a swallow-tailed saffron pennant.

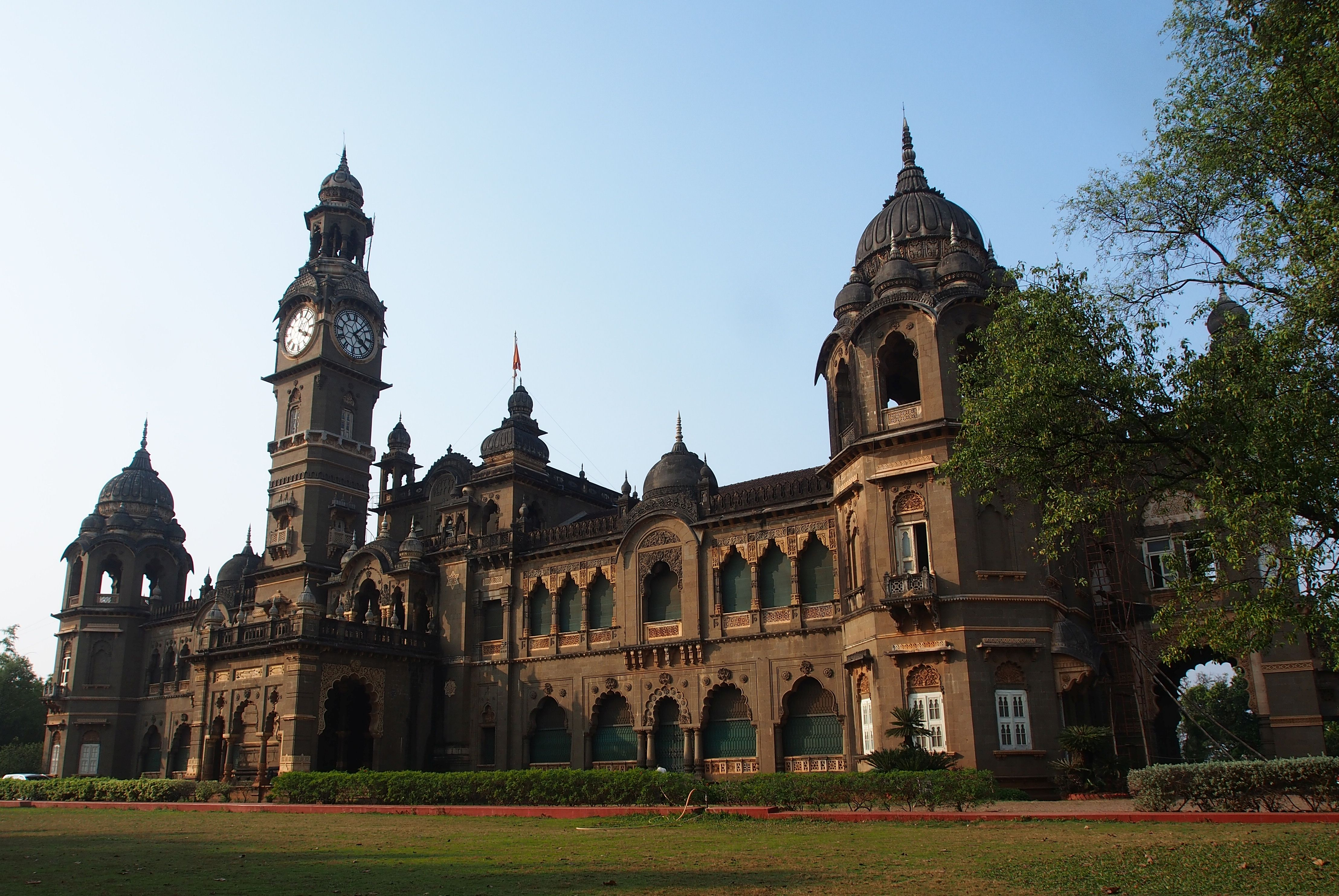
New Palace, Kolhapur

Kolhapur State, together with its jagirs or feudatory vassal estates (including Ichalkaranji), covered an area of 3,165 square miles (8,200 km^{2}). According to the 1901 census, the state population was 910,011, of which 54,373 resided in Kolhapur Town. In 1901, the state enjoyed an estimated revenue of £300,000.

== History ==
The Maharajas of Kolhapur have a common ancestry with the Bhonsle dynasty of Satara, being direct descendants of the Maratha King Shivaji. The states of Satara and Kolhapur came into being in 1707, because of the succession dispute over the Maratha throne. Shahuji, the heir apparent to the Maratha kingdom, captured by the Mughals at the age of nine, remained their prisoner at the death of his father Sambhaji, the elder son of Shivaji the founder of the Maratha Empire, in 1689. The Dowager Maharani Tarabai (widow of Rajaram I) proclaimed her son Shivaji II, as Chhatrapati under her regency. The Mughals released Shahu under certain conditions in 1707, and he returned to claim his inheritance. He defeated the regent at the Battle of Khed and established himself at Satara, forcing her to retire with her son to Kolhapur. By 1710, two separate principalities had become an established fact. Shivaji II and Tarabai were soon deposed by Rajasbai, the other widow of Rajaram. She installed her own son, Sambhaji II as the new ruler of Kolhapur. In the early years of his rule, Sambhaji made an alliance with the Nizam to wrest the Maratha kingdom from his cousin, Shahu. The defeat of the Nizam by Bajirao I in the Battle of Palkhed in 1728 led to the former ending his support for Sambhaji. Sambhaji II signed the Treaty of Warna in 1731 with his cousin Shahuji to formalize the two separate seats of Bhonsle family.

The British sent expeditions against Kolhapur in 1765 and 1792; Kolhapur entered into treaty relations with the British, after the collapse of the Maratha confederacy in 1818. In the early years of the 19th century the British invaded again, and appointed a political officer to temporarily manage the state.

A regent called Daji Krishna Pandit was installed by the British to govern the state in 1843 at a time when the natural heir to the throne was underage. He took direction from a political agent of the East India Company and among their actions were reforms to the tax of land. These reforms caused much resentment and, despite Kolhapur having refrained from involvement in the previous Anglo-Maratha Wars, a revolt against the British began in 1844. The rebellion began with soldiers locking themselves into hill-forts such as those as Panhala and Vishalgad, and then spread to Kolhapur itself. Both the regent and the political agent were captured by the militia forces led by Babaji Ahirekar. Ahirekar was killed in December 1844 and the revolt crushed.

The last ruler of Kolhapur was Maharaja Shahaji II. After Indian independence in 1947, Kolhapur acceded to the Dominion of India on 14 August 1947 and merged into Bombay State on 1 March 1949. In 1960 Bombay state was divided by languages into the states of Maharashtra and Gujarat. The boundaries of former Kolhapur state correspond very closely with those of modern-day Kolhapur district in Maharashtra state.

== Rulers of Kolhapur ==
All rulers have the personal title of 'Chhatrapati'.

=== Rajas of Kolhapur ===
Raja of Kolhapur
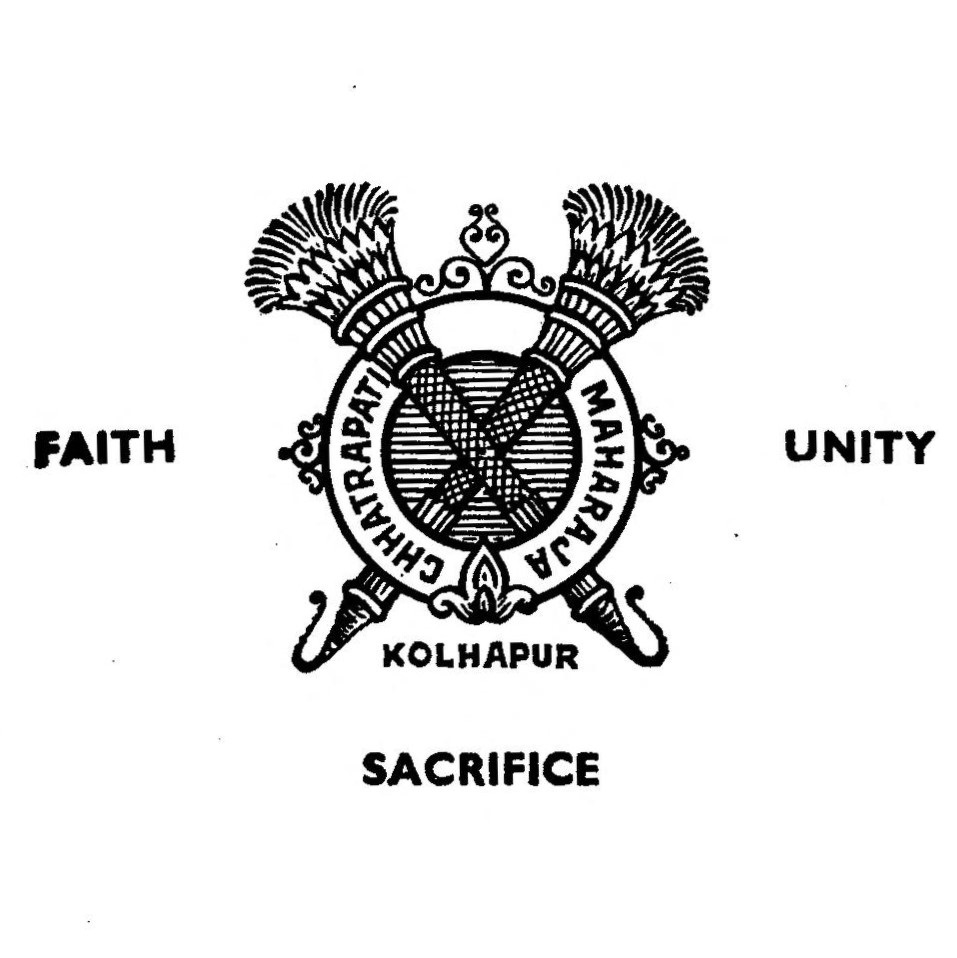
- State emblem

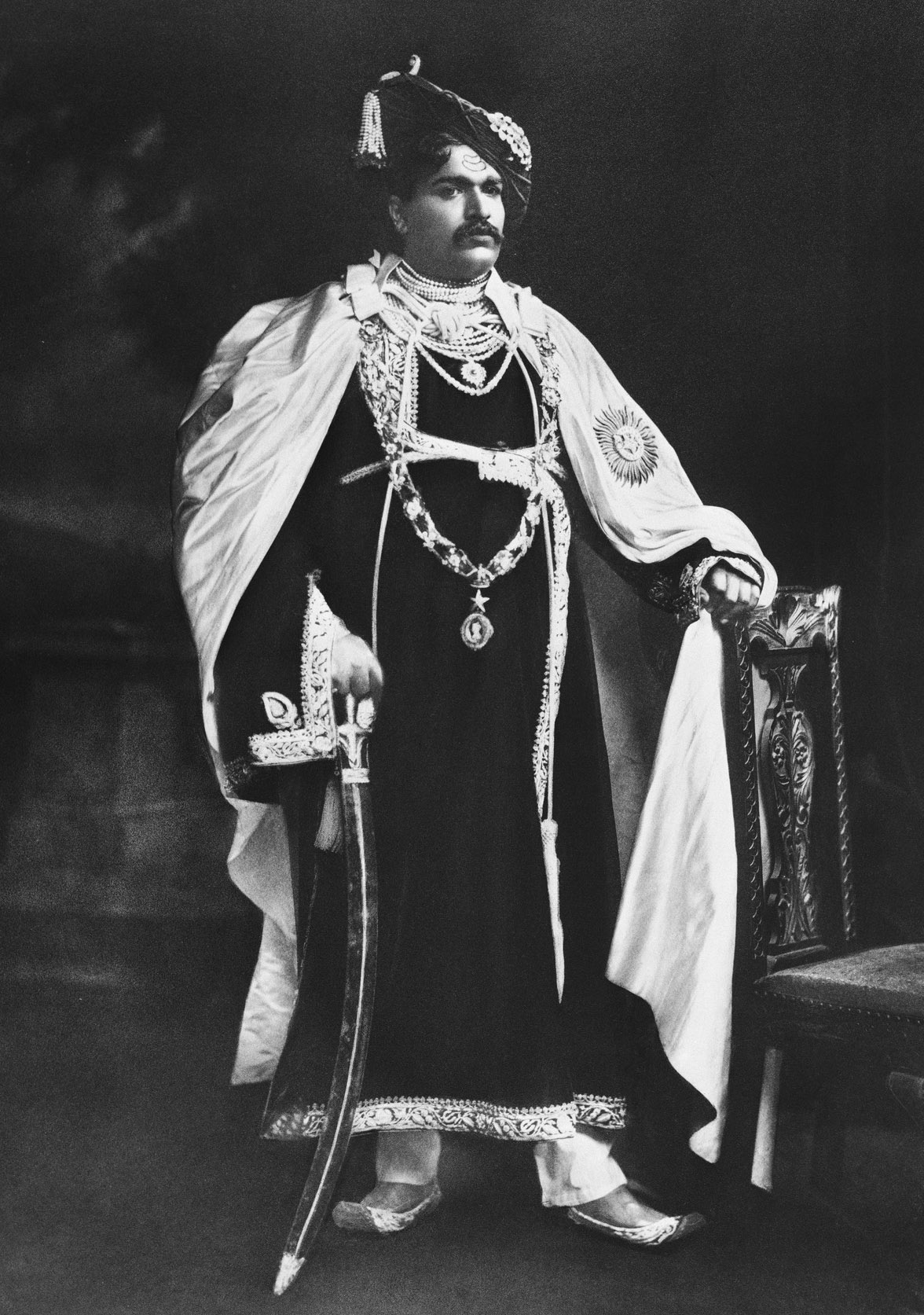
- Last to reign Shahu; 2 April 1894 – 1900

Details
- Style: His Majesty
- First monarch: Shivaji II
- Last monarch: Shahu
- Formed: 1710
- Abolished: 1900 (succeeded by Maharaja of Kolhapur)
- Pretender: Shahu II of Kolhapur (1983–present)

- 1710 – 2 Aug 1714 Shivaji I of Kolhapur (b. 1696 – d. 1726)
- 2 Aug 1714 – 18 Dec 1760 Sambhaji I of Kolhapur (b. 1698 – d. 1760)
- 20 Dec 1760 – 17 Feb 1773 Rani Jiji Bai (f) – Regent (b. 1716 – d. 1773)
- 22 Sep 1762 – 24 Apr 1813 Shivaji II of Kolhapur (b. 1756 – d. 1813)
- 24 Apr 1813 – 2 Jul 1821 Sambhaji II of Kolhapur (b. 1801 – d. 1821)
- 2 Jul 1821 – 3 Jan 1822 Shahaji -Regent (b. 1802 – d. 1838)
- 3 Jan 1822 – 29 Nov 1838 Shahaji
- 29 Nov 1838 – 4 Aug 1866 Shivaji III of Kolhapur (b. 1830 – d. 1866)
- 29 Nov 1838 – 1845 Rani Sai Bai (f) -Regent (d. 1861)
- 4 Aug 1866 – 30 Nov 1870 Rajaram I of Kolhapur Nagaji Rao (b. 1850 – d. 1870)
- 30 Nov 1870 – 12 Oct 1871 Rani Tara Bai (f) – Regent (b. 1855 – d. 1874)
- 12 Oct 1871 – 25 Dec 1883 Shivaji IV Chhatrapati Narayana Rao (b. 1863 – d. 1883)
- 25 Dec 1883 – 17 Mar 1884 Rani Anand Bai (f) – Regent
- 17 Mar 1884 – 1900 Shahu Chhatrapati Jashwant (b. 1874 – see below)

=== Maharajas of Kolhapur ===
Maharaja of Kolhapur
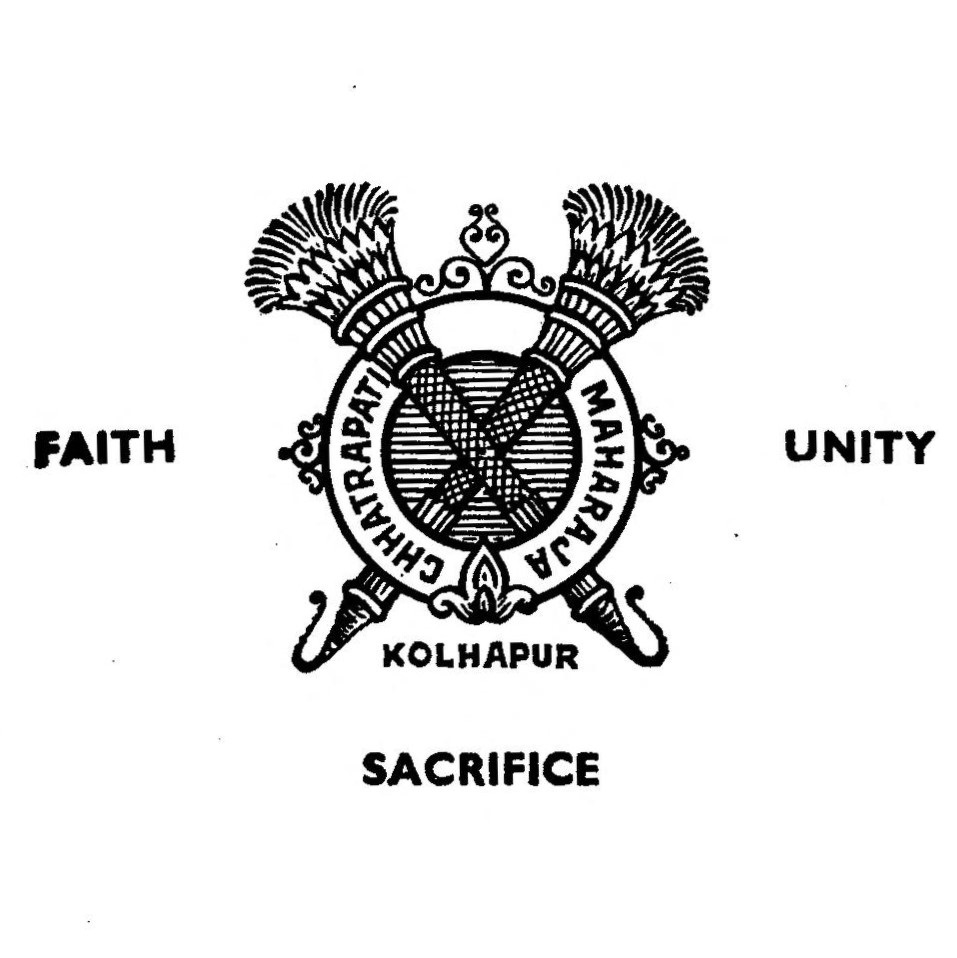
- State emblem

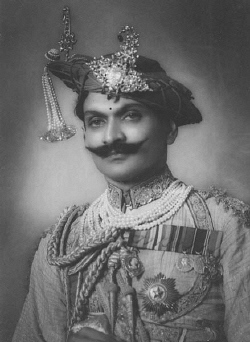
- Last to reign Shahaji II; 1947 – 1949

Details
- Style: His Majesty
- First monarch: Shahu
- Last monarch: Shahaji II
- Formed: 1900 (preceded by Maharaja of Kolhapur)
- Abolished: 1949
- Pretender: Shahu II of Kolhapur (1983–present)

- 1900 – 6 May 1922 Shahu Chhatrapati (see above; d. 1922)
- 6 May 1922 – 26 Nov 1940 Rajaram II of Kolhapur Chhatrapati (b. 1897 – d. 1940)
- 26 Nov 1940 – 18 Nov 1942 Tara Bai (f) -Regent (1st time) (b. 1904 – d. ....)
- 18 Nov 1942 – 28 Sep 1946 Shivaji VII Chhatrapati (b. 1941 – d. 1946)
- 22 Nov 1942 – 31 Mar 1947 Tara Bai (f) -Regent (2nd time) (s.a.)
- 31 Mar 1947 – 14 Aug 1947 Shahaji II Chhatrapati (b. 1910 – d. 1983)

=== Titular Maharajas ===
- 15 Aug 1947 – 9 May 1983 Shahaji II
- 1983 – present Shahu II

=== Family tree ===
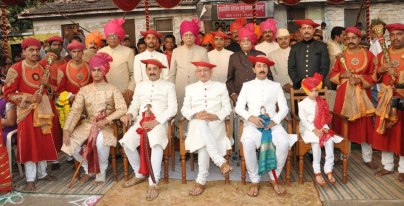
Royal family of the erstwhile Kolhapur state in 2011

- Babaaji Bhonsle
  - Maloji Bhosale (1552–1606/20/22)
    - Shahaji Bhonsle (c. 1594–1664)
      - Shivaji The king of the Maratha Kingdom (r. 1674–1680)
        - Sambhaji, King of the Maratha kingdom (1657–1689; r. 1680–1689)
        - Rajaram, King of the Maratha Kingdom (1670–1700; r. 1689–1700)
          - I. Shivaji II, Raja of Kolhapur (1696–1726; Raja of Kolhapur: 1710–1714)
          - II. Sambhaji II, Raja of Kolhapur (1698–1760; r. 1714–1760)
    - Sharifjirao
      - Trimbukjirao
        - Venkatjirao
          - Mankojirao
            - Shahajirao
              - III. Shivaji III, Raja of Kolhapur (1756–1813; r. 1762–1813)
                - IV. Sambhaji III, Raja of Kolhapur (1801–1821; r. 1813–1821)
                  - V. Shivaji IV, Raja of Kolhapur (1816–1822; r. 1821–1822)
                - VI. Shahaji I, Raja of Kolhapur (1802–1838; r. 1822–1838)
                  - VII. Shivaji V, Raja of Kolhapur KCSI (1830–1866; r. 1838–1866)
                  - Shrimati Akhand Soubhagyavati Aubai Patankar m. (1845) Shrimant Sardar Ramchandrarao Patankar, Patil of Patan
                    - VIII. Rajaram I, Raja of Kolhapur (1850–1870; r. 1866–1870)
                  - Shrimati Akhand Soubhagyavati Balabai Maharaj Ghatge (d. 1867), m. (1848) Meherban Shrimant Chiranjiva Rajashri Narayanrao Ghatge, Sarjerao, Chief of Kagal Junior (c. 1833–1881)
                    - HH Meherban Shrimant Rajamanya Rajashri Jaisinhrao Ghatge, Sarjerao, Vazarat, Ma-ab, Chief of Kagal Senior (1857–1885) m. (2nd; 1878) Shrimant Akhand Soubhagyavati Radhabai Sahib Ghatge
                      - X. Shahu I, Maharaja of Kolhapur GCSI, GCIE, GCVO (1874–1922; r. 1884–1922; Raja of Kolhapur: 1884; Maharaja of Kolhapur: 1900)
                        - HH Shrimant Akhand Soubhagyavati Maharani Radhabai Maharaj Puar, Maharani of Dewas Senior (1894–1973) m. (1908) HH Tukojirao III, Maharaja of Dewas Senior KCSI (1888–1937)
                          - XIII. Shahaji II, Maharaja of Dewas Senior, Maharaja of Kolhapur GCSI (1910–1983; Maharaja of Dewas Senior: 1937–1947; Maharaja of Kolhapur: 1947–1949; titular ruler: 1949–1971; family head: 1971–1983)
                            - Shrimant Akhand Soubhagyavati Maharajkumari Shaliniraje Sahib Maharaj Bhonsle (b. 1929) m. (1945) Shrijut Raje Rajaramsinhrao Laxmanrao Bhonsle (d. 1970)
                              - XIV. Shahu II, Maharaja of Kolhapur (b. 1948; family head: 1983–present)
                        - XI. Rajaram III, Maharaja of Kolhapur GCSI, GCIE (1897–1940; r. 1922–1940)
              - Sambhajirao
                - Ramchandrarao
                  - Narayanjirao
                    - Dinkarrao (b. 1832)
                      - IX. Shivaji VI, Raja of Kolhapur KCSI (1863–1883; r. 1871–1883)
              - Swarupjirao
                - Mankojirao
                  - Yashwantrao (1832–1884)
                    - Appa Sahib
                      - Shivajirao
                        - Shankarrao (b. 1922)
                          - XII. Shivaji VII, Maharaja of Kolhapur (1941–1946; r. 1941–1946)

=== Family tree (Simplified) ===
Family tree of Maratha Rajas and later Maharajas of Kolhapur
Biological Child
Adopted Child

Tarabai	Rajaram I Chhatrapati r. 1689-1700	Rajasbai
Shivaji II^{(1)} r. 1710-1714	Sambhaji II^{(2)} r. 1714-1760
Shivaji III^{(3)} r. 1762-1813
Sambhaji III^{(4)} r. 1813-1821	Shahaji I^{(6)} r. 1822-1838
Shivaji IV^{(5)} r. 1821-1822	Shivaji V^{(7)} r. 1838-1866	Ramchandra; Rao; Patankar	Narayan Rao; Ghatge
Rajaram II^{(8)} r. 1866-1871	Jai Singh; Rao Ghatge
Shivaji VI^{(9)} r. 1871-1883	Shahu I^{(10)} r. 1884-1922
Shivaji VII^{(12)} r. 1941-1946	Rajaram III^{(11)} r. 1922-1940	Radhabai
Shahaji II^{(13)} r. 1947-1949 – Titular – r. 1949-1983
Rajaram; Singh Rao
Shahu II^{(14)} – Titular – r. 1983-present

== Feudatory Jagirs ==
There were Eleven Feudatory Jagirdars of Kolhapur. They all paid Nazar on succession equal to a year's net income of their Jagirs and also an annual contribution towards the maintenance of military force. They are:

- Vishalgad
- Bavda
- Kagal (Senior)
- Kagal (Junior)
- Kapshi
- Torgal
- Ichalkaranji
- Himmat Bahadur
- SarLashkar Bahadur
- Shahi Sarnobat
- Raovishvasrao

== See also ==
- Maratha
- Maratha Empire
- List of Maratha dynasties and states
- List of princely states of British India (alphabetical)
- Maharajas of Kolhapur
- Panhala Fort
