= Monumento all'Indiano, Florence =

Monumento all'Indiano
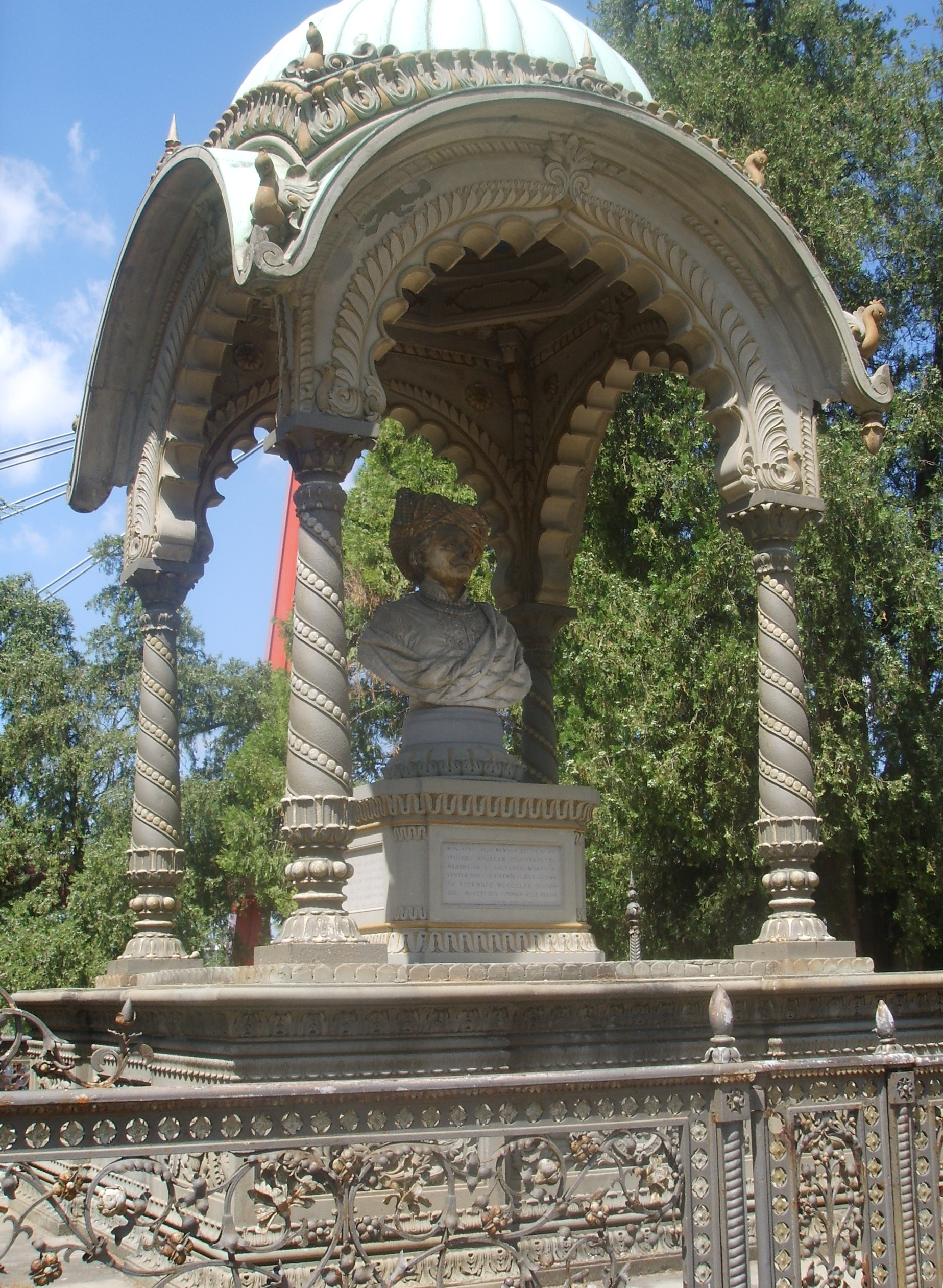
- Monumento all'Indiano
- Interactive map of Monumento all'Indiano
- Location: Parco delle Cascine, Florence, Tuscany, Italy
- Coordinates: 43°47′25.59″N 11°11′52.18″E
- Designer: Charles Francis Fuller
- Type: Monument
- Dedicated to: Maratha Maharajah of Kolhapur, Rajaram Chhatrapati

The Monumento all'Indiano or Monument to the Indian Prince, more specifically "Monument to the Maratha Maharajah of Kolhapur, Rajaram Chhatrapati" consisting of a chhatri or small raised dome, in Italian terms a baldacchino, over the bust of the Indian prince, at the west end of the Parco delle Cascine in Florence, Tuscany, Italy.

== Description ==
This is an unusual monument attached to an unusual event. In 1870, returning from London after paying his respects to Queen Victoria, the 20-year-old Maharajah Rajaram II died from a febrile illness in his hotel room in the "La Pace Hotel". His courtiers asked to conduct a cremation, or Antyesti ceremony, at the confluence of two rivers. They were able to perform a ceremony at the confluence of the Arno and stream of the Mugnone, near this site in the park. The events and the ceremony elicited a great deal of curiosity in the public.

The act of cremation, banned in Florence, led to a fierce argument among doctors and scientists as to the merits and morals of the funeral technique. The costs of the monument were financed by the British government, partly by The Regency Council of Kolhapur who employed the sculptor Charles Francis Fuller, Charles Mant was the architect who used an Indian form in a version of Indo-Saracenic architecture. The base has inscriptions in English, Italian, and Marathi.

In 1972, a modern bridge was built near the site and takes the name of Ponte all'Indiano.
