= Shivaji IV of Kolhapur =

Raja of Kolhapur from 1871 to 1883

Shivaji IV
- Chhatrapati and Raja of Kolhapur; KCSI
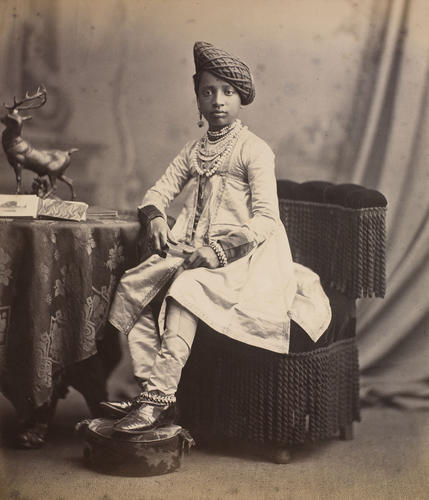
- Shivaji IV in c. 1875
- Reign: 23 October 1871 – 25 December 1883
- Predecessor: Rajaram I of Kolhapur
- Successor: Shahu of Kolhapur
- Born: Naranayao Bhosle; 5 April 1863
- Died: 25 December 1883 (aged 20)
- Father: Dinkarrao Bhosle (biological)
- Mother: Radhabai (biological); Rani Tarabai (adoptive)

Shivaji IV (5 April 1863 – 25 December 1883) (Note: Most sources including historians Manohar Malgonkar, Shruti Kapila, Avanish Kapil, and others refer to him as Shivaji IV, as he was the fourth Raja/Maharaja of Kolhapur with the regnal name Shivaji. A few websites refer to him as Shivaji VI or Shivaji V.) was Raja of Kolhapur from 1871 to 1883. On 1 January 1878, at age 14, he was knighted with the title of Knight Commander of the Order of the Star of India (KCSI). Diagnosed by British doctors as mentally ill, he was subjected to mistreatment and died under mysterious circumstances at the age of 20.

== Early life ==
Born on 5 April 1863, Narayanao was the son of Dinkarrao Bhosle, an inamdar, and Radhabai. A descendant of Shivaji, he was from the Sawardekar branch of the Bhosle family.

=== Adoption as heir ===
On 23 October 1871, at the age of eight and a half, he was adopted as heir to the Kolhapur State, and became known as Shivaji IV. He was chosen from as many as eight candidates to succeed Rajaram I of Kolhapur, who had died childless in 1870. His accession as Raja followed an interregnum of ten months and twenty-two days during which there was technically no ruler of Kolhapur.

Shivaji IV was subsequently treated as an official ward of the British colonial authorities due to his young age. His adoptive mother, Rani Tarabai, was barely twelve years old herself. The political agent Colonel Anderson appointed Captain Edward West, who had been the guardian of the late Rajaram, as his guardian. They sought to keep the Raja away from the palace, far from the influence of the royal court attendants and female family members.

Two young princes close in age to Shivaji were selected and brought to Kolhapur to study and play with him. After West was transferred out of Kolhapur in January 1873, the assistant political agent S. Hammick took over as his guardian.

=== Early education ===
In the early years, Yeshwantrao Wasudev Athale was engaged as his tutor. Shivaji IV and the two princes – Basaheb Sardesai of Sawantwadi and Balasaheb Ghorpade of Mudhol – attended Kolhapur High School during the day and were expected to do homework in the mornings and evenings, according to a strict timetable.

When Hammick took over as guardian in 1873, he arranged to have a special school set up for children of the nobility, with its own building and staff. Three more boys from noble families of Mhaisal, Nippani, and Wadi joined the Raja and the two princes at the new Rajaram High School. Following Anderson's departure in 1874, Colonel Schneider took his place as political agent. Schneider appointed a new tutor, Achyat Narayan Ajgaonkar, after the first tutor retired.

== Relations with British royalty ==
=== Prince of Wales ===
In October 1875, the Prince of Wales visited Bombay. Shivaji IV travelled to the city, where he presented the Prince with a jewelled sword and dagger. In return, the Prince of Wales presented the Raja with a British officer's sword, a gold medal, a snuff box, an atlas and a photograph of himself. During the visit, the Prince also acquired a portrait of Shivaji IV. To commemorate the visit, the Albert Edward Hospital was later built in Kolhapur.

=== Knighthood ===
During the Great Famine of 1876–1878, the new governor of Bombay, Sir Richard Temple, visited Kolhapur twice. Impressed with the relief work performed in the region, he announced that Shivaji IV would be awarded a knighthood. Originally it was planned to confer the Raja with the knighthood in 1877 at a durbar in Delhi to celebrate Queen Victoria's assumption of the title Emperor of India. However, due to the ongoing famine, his trip to Delhi was cancelled.

Instead, Shivaji IV was conferred as a Knight Commander of the Order of the Star of India at a durbar in Kolhapur on 1 January 1878. Accounts from this time indicate that the Raja was healthy, both mentally and physically, and that he had made "commendable" progress in his studies.

== Marriage ==
Shivaji IV was married on 21 May 1878. His bride was Yamanubai, the daughter of Waghojirao Shirke of Satara, who was ten-and-a-half years old. She took the married name Anandibai.

Dowager Sakwarbai, the second wife of Chhatrapati Rajaram, and other family elders had pushed for the Raja to be married in recognition of his coming of age. According to the historian Shruti Kapila, while his British wards had prioritised the prince's education, marriage was a priority in the Indian context. Schneider, who obtained the consent of the Bombay colonial government in February 1878, had stipulated that the bride should be chosen "from amongst the many Maratha families of distinction but in reduced circumstances". Yamanubai was chosen from as many as forty-five proposals of marriage from high-ranking Maratha families. Out of sensitivity to the ongoing famine, the wedding of Shivaji IV and Anandibai was not a lavish affair, unlike most princely weddings.

== Further education ==
In October 1878, Shivaji IV was sent by British officials to Rajkumar College, also known as the Princes' College, at Rajkot. The intention was to provide the Raja with an Etonian-style education and to help him overcome his "shyness". Founded in 1870 and led by principal Chester Mcnaughton, Rajkumar College emphasised physical exercise as well as sermons on "gentlemanly duty and benevolent rule". A special tutor, B. P. Modak, was selected to accompany Shivaji. Also joining were two of his companions, Sidhojirao Appasaheb Desai Nipanikar and Appasaheb Shinde Mahisalkar.

School records graded Shivaji's performance as "average" and do not indicate that he was struggling. He played in a cricket match and participated in other sports. Although he did not win any awards, he also avoided getting into trouble. In April 1879, Shivaji returned to Kolhapur at the end of the term. After the summer holidays, Shivaji briefly went back to Rajkumar College in June with his tutor and two companions. Apparently ill, within a few weeks, he was taken back to Bombay for a medical examination and assessment of his mental state.

== Illness and maltreatment ==
The question of the mental state of Shivaji IV is a matter of significant controversy and ultimately became known as the Kolhapur Affair (Kolhapur Prakaran). According to British officials, upon his return from Rajaram College in April 1879, the Raja began to show signs of mental illness. Upon examining him, three British doctors – Hunt, Cook and Murphy – recommended a "change of air". In October 1879, Shivaji was sent to Mahabaleshwar station, where the air was cooler. Initially he was accompanied by his tutor Modak, as well as Rambhau Ainarpurkar, a clerk from the office of the Karbhari. In December 1879, they were joined by Shivaji's new guardian Edmund Cox, who had been appointed assistant political agent. The Indian author Manohar Malgonkar described Cox as "an arrogant jingo in the worst Kipling tradition, a man who implicitly believed in race-superiority" and "the sort of abrasive individual whose enforced companionship would have driven most normal Indians to insanity".

In July 1880, Hunt, Cook and Murphy reported that Shivaji IV was suffering from "delusions" and recommended replacing all his Indian servants with Europeans, implying that this would protect him from "harmful" or "evil tendencies". According to Cox, Shivaji was exhibiting a crisis of identity, denying that he was the Maharaja of Kolhapur and claiming on different occasions to be the Prince of Wales or an Ottoman soldier defending the Khyber Pass. Shivaji was moved to the Fort of Ahmednagar with two custodians, Cox and the soldier Private Thomas Green. According to his successor Shahu of Kolhapur, while Shivaji was essentially being kept captive at the Fort of Ahmednagar, he was subjected to mistreatment by Green, which included withholding his food from him. Concerned for his son's welfare, his birth father Dinkarrao Bhosle tried repeatedly to see him, but was denied. Finding his situation intolerable, Shivaji IV twice tried to escape from Cox and Green. On one occasion, he tried to slip away disguised as a cart driver, using cigar ash to blacken his face. On another, he tried to gallop away during his daily horse ride.

=== Newspaper coverage ===
In 1881, Indian-owned newspapers led by the Kesari started publishing critical articles demanding an inquiry into Shivaji's mental health and welfare, significantly influencing public opinion. In contrast, Anglo-Indian newspapers such as The Times of India and the Bombay Gazette published editorials arguing that Shivaji IV was insane and that Cox and Green were doing whatever they could to help him.

Asserting that his mental illness was "incurable", the Anglo-Indian newspapers made the case for designating a new prince to replace Shivaji. The Kesari and other Indian-owned newspapers countered that replacing Shivaji was unnecessary because his mental state was the result of the cruel treatment he had been subjected to by Cox, Green and Mahadev Barve, the Karbhari of Kolhapur. On 17 January 1882, the Kesari published three letters allegedly written by Barve to subordinate officials "which indicated his involvement along with some British officials and native servants in a plot to poison Shivaji IV." The article argued that keeping the Raja in their custody was dangerous and that Shivaji might even try to harm himself in desperation.

=== Defamation suit and testimony ===
As public opinion intensified, the British colonial government asked Barve to file a defamation lawsuit in the courts to clear his name. The lawsuit named five individuals. Nana Bhide, the lawyer for Shivaji's birth mother, and Keshav Bakahale, were accused of sending false letters, while Agarkar, Tilak, and Vaman Ranade, the editors of the Kesari, Mahratta, and Dnyan Prakash, were accused of publishing them. The trial began in January 1882. In July 1882, the Bombay High Court ruled in favour of Barve, sentencing the editors to four-months' imprisonment.

Although they lost the legal case, the proceedings received considerable interest in western Maharashtra and exposed many facts about the maltreatment of Shivaji IV. Murphy testified that he had beaten the Raja in front of his servants two or three times, deeming such beatings to be "necessary". Green also admitted physically abusing Shivaji. In the end, the jury decided to ignore the question of maltreatment and decided the case purely on the question of whether the letters were authentic. Barve claimed that the signatures on the letters did not resemble his handwriting. Although several witnesses testified they recognised his signature, convincing many in the broader public about the authenticity of the letters, the jury determined that there was no evidence that they were genuine and could have been traced.

== Death and legacy ==
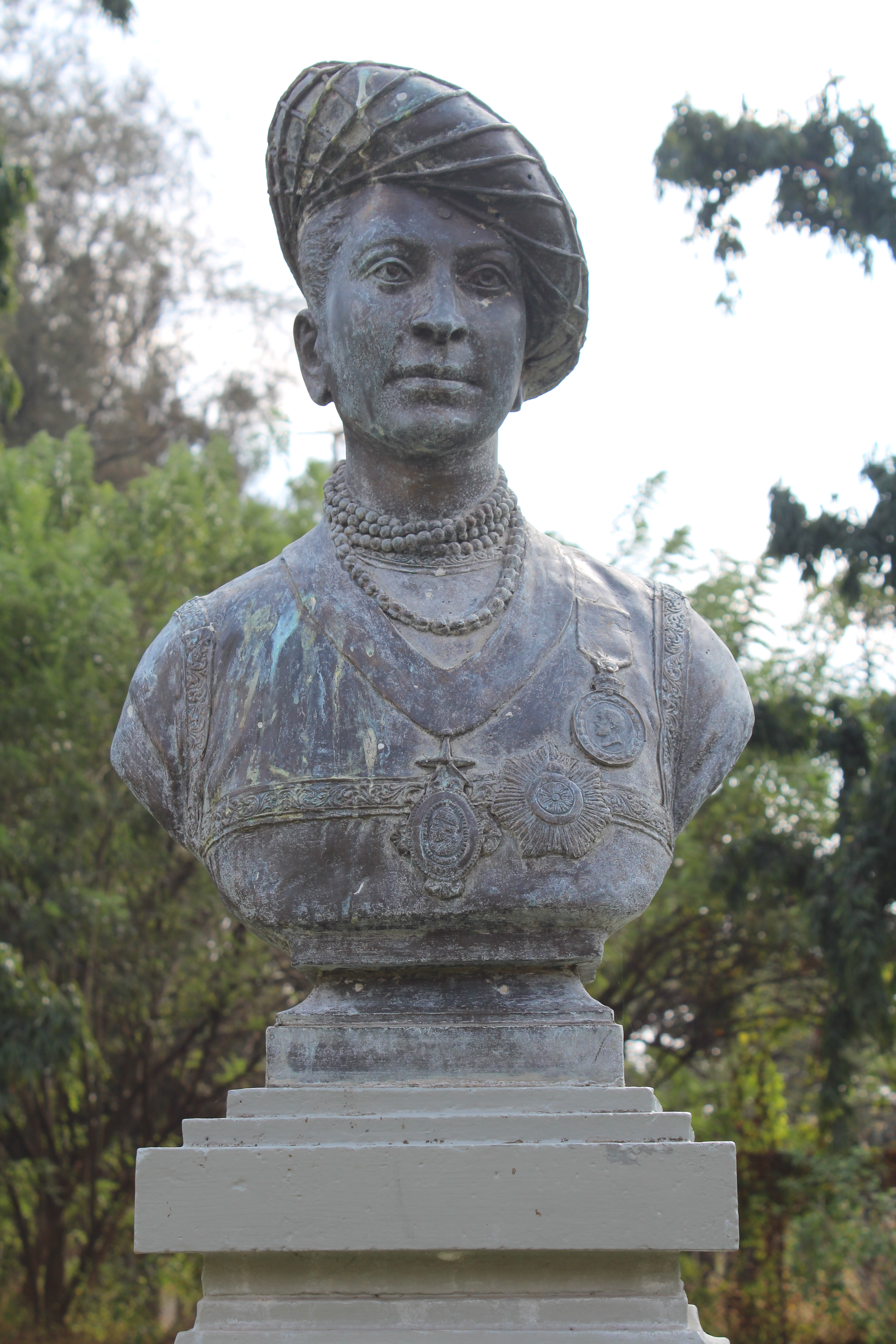
Bust of Chh. Shivaji IV of Kolhapur in the gardens of New Palace, Kolhapur

On 25 December 1883, Shivaji IV died following a physical altercation with Green. The coroner's report returned a verdict of accidental death due to the rupture of the Raja's enlarged spleen during the altercation, though a doctor who had examined Shivaji IV a week earlier did not report any enlargement of his spleen. The academic Avanish Patel noted that claims of ruptured spleens were often used in late-19th century India to let Europeans off the hook for murdering Indians. His medical records from one week prior did not mention anything wrong with his spleen. His widow, Rani Anandibai, adopted his successor, Shahu of Kolhapur, in 1884.

== Titles ==
- 1863–1871: Shrimant Narayanrao Dinkarrao Bhonsle
- 1871–1877: His Highness Shrimant Rajashri Shivaji IV Chhatrapati Maharaj Sahib Rao Bahadur, Raja of Kolhapur
- 1878–1883: His Highness Shrimant Rajashri Sir Shivaji IV Chhatrapati Maharaj Sahib Bahadur, Raja of Kolhapur, KCSI

== Notes ==
Shivaji IV of Kolhapur Bhonsle dynasty (Kolhapur line)
Regnal titles
Preceded by Rajaram of Kolhapur (as Raja of Kolhapur)	Raja of Kolhapur; 1871–1883	Succeeded by Shahu of Kolhapur
