= Parco delle Cascine =

Park in Florence, Italy

Coordinates: 43°46′55.44″N 11°13′5.41″E

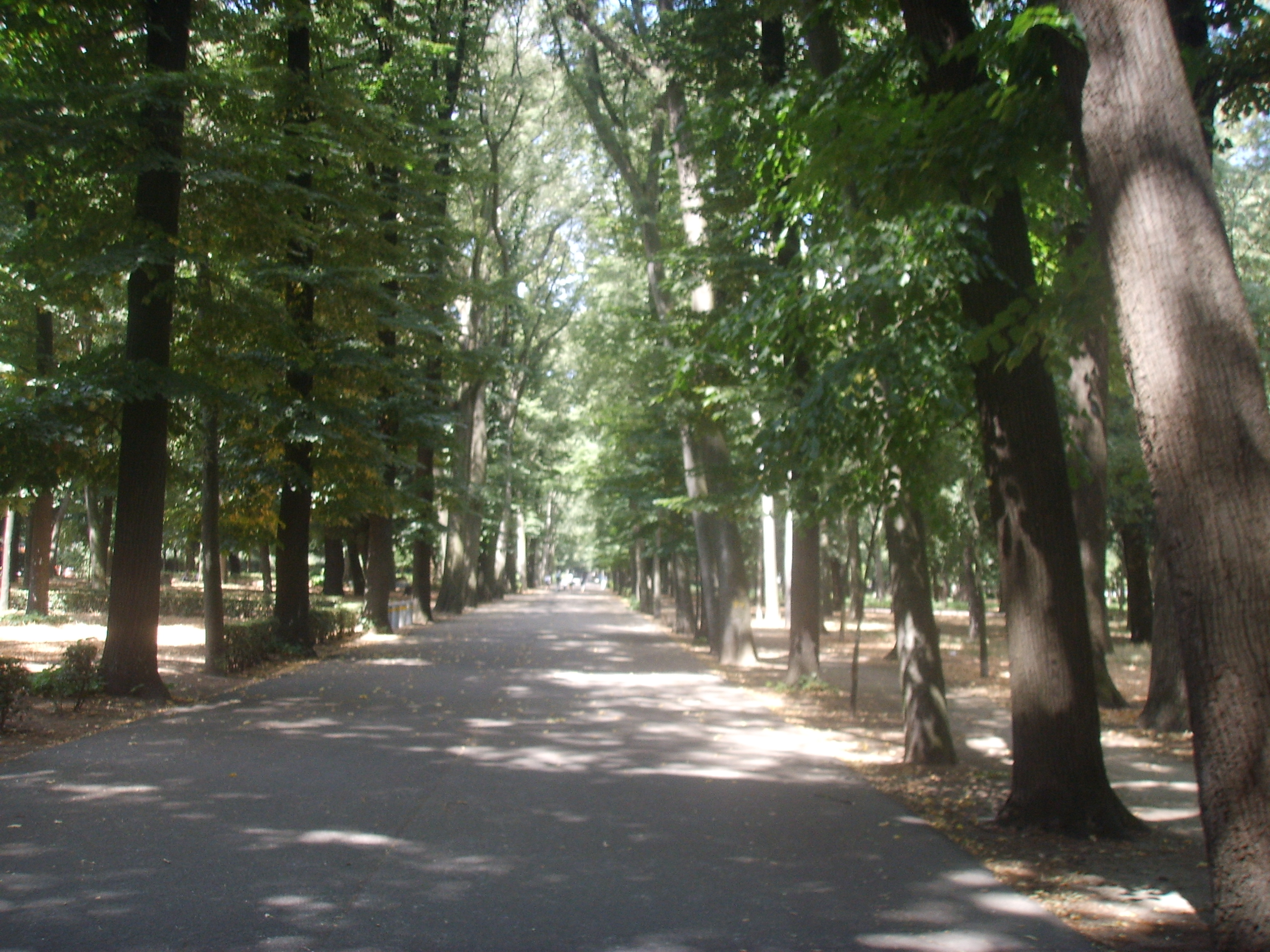
Typical boulevard

The Parco delle Cascine (Cascine Park) is a monumental and historical park in the city of Florence. The park covers an area of 160 hectares (395 acres). It has the shape of a long and narrow stripe, on the north bank of the Arno river. It extends from the centre of Florence until the point where the Mugnone flows into the Arno.

== History ==
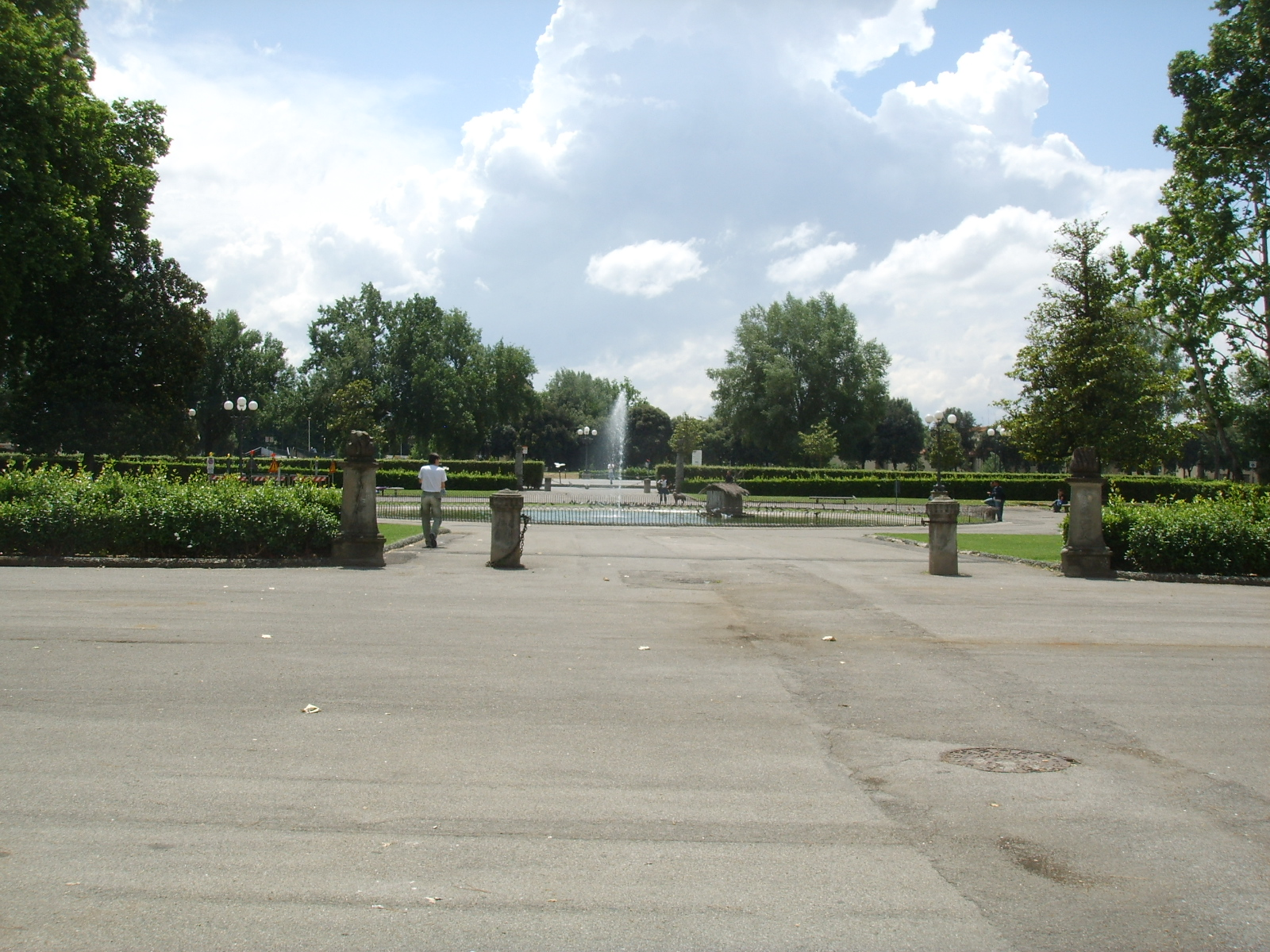
Piazzale Kennedy

The building of the Park began in 1563, under the rule of Cosimo I de' Medici, as a farming and hunting estate of the Medici family, ruling the city of Florence since 1434. The very name of the Park derives from the ancient Italian word "cascio", meaning cheese. The farm and parklands were well cared by the Medicis. Rare and exotic plants were chosen for the park, also for scientific reasons.

In the 18th century, with the Grand Duchy transferring to the Habsburg-Lorraines, the park gradually acquired a recreative function in the urban system, conserved until the present days. However, until the beginning of the 19th century, the park remained usually closed to the public, with the exception of some particular events.

The Grand Duke Pietro Leopoldo commissioned from the architect Giuseppe Manetti, the design construction of a model farming estate, centered around the Palazzina Reale delle Cascine (small casino-palace now housing the Agronomy faculty of the University of Florence). Other structures added were the Abbeveratoio del Quercione fountain, the pyramid-shaped ice-house, the amphitheatre and two neoclassical Pavoniere (originally ornamental peacock cages). Among the fountains was the Narcisus Fountain, from which the English poet Percy Bysshe Shelley putatively draw inspiration writing the Ode to the West Wind, in 1820. Giuseppe Manetti was also responsible for organizing celebrations and receptions in the park, such as the ceremony to celebrate the arrival of Ferdinand III of Tuscany, in July 1791.

In 1809–1811, the new Grand Duchess, Elisa Bonaparte, converted the farm into a public park. The park was acquired by the Municipality of Florence in 1869, which committed the renovation of the park to the architect Felice Francolini. Sport clubs which regularly competed in the Quercione meadow were: Florence Football Club, Itala Foot Ball Club, Juventus Foot-Ball Club, Firenze FBC, Club Sportivo Firenze and PGF Libertas. However, in 1917 the municipality decided to forbid to any sport club to play football in the park.

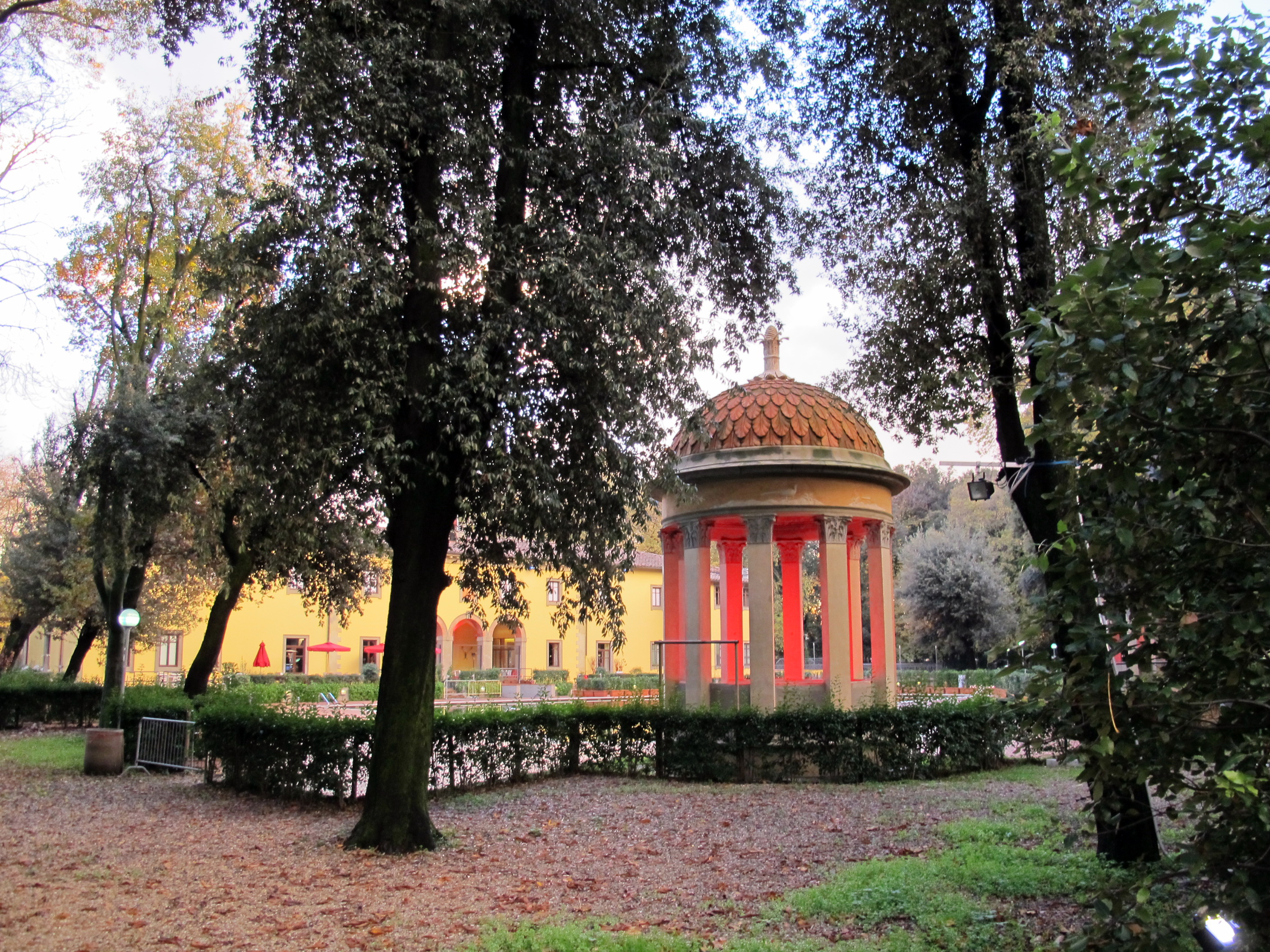
Pavoniera, formerly a peacock cage.

The last relevant monument built in the Cascine Park was the Monumento all'Indiano a monument realised by the English sculptor Fuller in honour of the young Indian (Maratha) prince Rajaram Chhatrapati, Maharaja of Kolhapur, who suddenly died while visiting Florence in 1865.

The amphitheatre was named in March 2015 after a well-known son of Florence, Ernesto de Pascale, music journalist and blues-rock musician who died 2011.

== Description ==
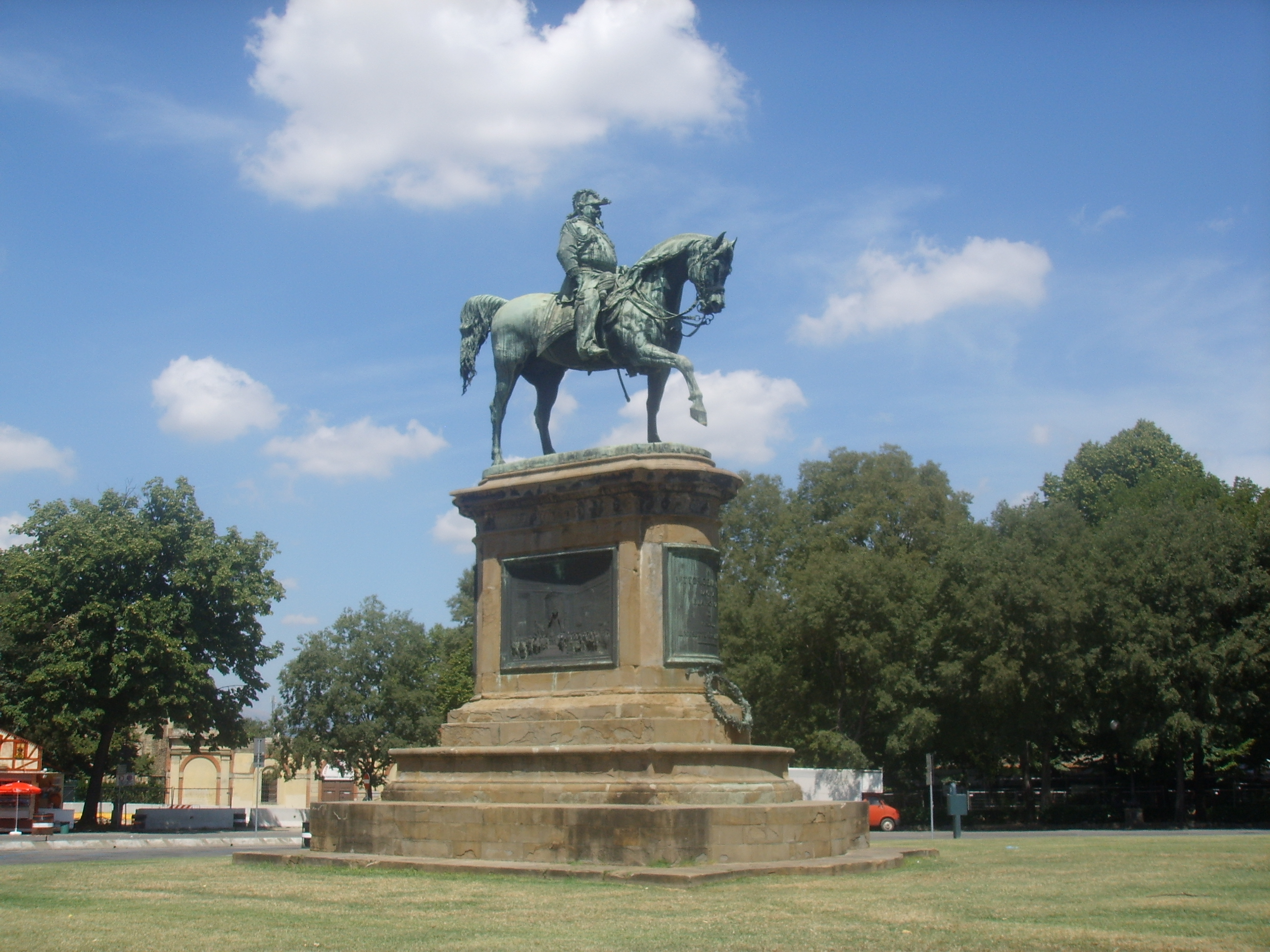
Vittorio Emanuele II Monument, once in Piazza della Repubblica.

A number of meadows of different extension, sometimes limited by wooded areas, are situated in the park: their names are Tinaia, del Quercione, delle Cornacchie. Other smaller meadows are situated within gardens or squares. Wooded areas cover more than 35 hectares. The total number of trees situated in the park is about 19.000.

The secular human presence radically modified flora, reducing its natural self-renovation.

Centuries-old English oaks, elms, maples and ashes are slowly being replaced by spontaneous vegetation, represented by acacias, trees of heaven, elders, ivy, pines and nettle trees. The highest level of species assortment can be found in the western part of the park, while in the eastern part, nearer to the city centre, mainly lindens and oaks are diffused. A botanically relevant arboretum is situated in the garden of the Scuola di Guerra Aerea (School of Air War).

The strength and luxuriance of plants show the fecundity of soil and the presence of a good water reserve, communicating with the Arno bed. Long hedges, selected to resist to dryness and to shady positions, are present everywhere in the park (their overall length is about 30 km).

The central part of the park is characterised by a monumental complex, situated in Piazzale delle Cascine, dominated by the Palazzina Reale, and its bordering areas, including Piazzale Kennedy with its circular fountain.

The Piazza Vittorio Veneto, with the Vittorio Emanuele II bronze statue, represents the monumental entrance of the park. The statue was once situated in the centre of Florence, Piazza della Repubblica, and was moved in the actual position in 1932. The square, along with the bordering Giardino della Catena, is decorated with impressive trees (pines, plane trees, Ginkgo Biloba, oaks, horse chestnuts and cedars). This variety of species gives to the area the autumn colourfulness typical of Italian style gardens.

The park hosts a number of civil and sport infrastructures, such as tennis and football fields, a velodrome, shooting and archery fields, two hippodromes, a public swimming pool, the School of Air War, a visiting centre, police offices, the Faculty of Agronomy, and a public school.

Since 2010 the Line T1 of the tramway of Florence has a stop in the park, in Viale degli Olmi, which improves accessibility in the area for visitors arriving from the city centre (Stazione SMN) or from Scandicci.

== Enhancing interventions ==
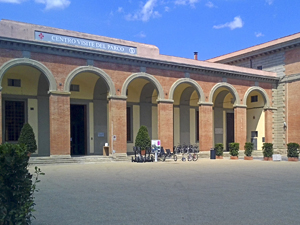
Park visiting centre, situated in Piazzale delle Cascine

A visiting centre for the park opened in August 2013, in the old stable building, Piazzale delle Cascine, to offer visitor cultural, natural and historical information about the Park. In the framework of a broader enhancing interventions plan, a number of other structural interventions are being carried out by the municipality, in order to improve usability conditions for the area. Part of the 2013 cycling UCI road world Championship took place inside the park.
