= Paolo Sica =

Italian architect and urban planner (1935–1988)

- Born: 30 April 1935; Livorno, Kingdom of Italy
- Died: 27 September 1988 (aged 53); Paris, France
- Education: University of Florence; University of Illinois Urbana-Champaign
- Occupations: Architect, urban planner, academic

Paolo Sica (30 April 1935 – 27 September 1988) was an Italian architect, urban planner, and architectural historian. He is best known for his theoretical and historical studies on urban form and for his academic activity at the University of Florence.

== Life and career ==
Born in Livorno and raised mainly in Florence, Sica graduated in architecture in 1960 under Ludovico Quaroni. He continued his training in London, working at the London County Council, and in the United States, where he earned a master's degree from the University of Illinois Urbana-Champaign in 1962.

Upon returning to Italy, he became assistant to Edoardo Detti and contributed to the Intermunicipal Plan of the Florence area (1965). His early theoretical work focused on the relationship between traffic systems and urban form, a theme explored in Traffico e forma urbana (1967). He later published L'immagine della città da Sparta a Las Vegas (1970), a major study on the historical evolution of the city image.

Sica taught territorial design and urban planning at the Faculty of Architecture in Florence, becoming full professor in 1981. He combined theoretical research with professional practice, participating in numerous architectural and urban design competitions, including the project for the new University of Florence (1972), the Bologna railway station competition (1981), and the redevelopment of the former Murate prison in Florence (1987).

Between 1976 and 1980 he published the multi-volume Storia dell'urbanistica and the Antologia di urbanistica. He also lectured internationally and served (1982–1984) as professor of Théorie et Histoire Urbaine at the Haute École du paysage, d'ingénierie et d'architecture in Geneva.

He died in Paris in 1988.

== Selected works ==
- Intermunicipal plan of the Florence area (1965), contributor
- Experimental project for the urban expressway system (1967), promoted by the Centro Studi Nicola Pistelli
- Indiano Bridge, Florence (1968), with Adriano Montemagni
- "Amalasunta" project for the new University of Florence (1972), with Edoardo Detti, Vittorio Gregotti and others – winner of the international competition
- Environmental redevelopment of the Arbia Valley and PEEP housing plan, Taverne d'Arbia (1981)
- Master plan of San Giovanni Valdarno (1981–1983)
- Competition project for the new Bologna railway station (1981)
- Studies for the rehabilitation of the Santa Maria della Scala complex, Siena (1982), with Gianfranco Di Pietro and Marco Dezzi Bardeschi
- Urban plan for the new Castello settlement, Florence (1985–1987)
- Redevelopment project for the former Murate prison, Florence (1987)

== Selected writings ==
- Traffico e forma urbana. Florence: CLUSF, 1967.
- L'immagine della città da Sparta a Las Vegas. Bari: Laterza, 1970 (2nd ed. 1991).
- Storia dell'urbanistica. Bari: Laterza, 1976–1978.
- Firenze: la questione urbanistica. Scritti e contributi 1945–1975. Florence: Sansoni, 1982.
- Scritti e progetti per Firenze 1963–1988. Venice: Marsilio, 1989.
- Firenze. Profilo di storia urbana. Florence: Alinea, 1995.
