= Sambhaji II of Kolhapur =

Raja of Kolhapur from 1813 to 1821

Abasaheb Chhatrapati (died 1821), also known as Sambhaji II, was Raja of Kolhapur of the Bhonsle dynasty. He was murdered. He ruled from 24 April 1813 to 2 July 1821.

Sambhaji II of Kolhapur Bhonsle dynasty (Kolhapur line)
Regnal titles
Preceded by Shivaji II of Kolhapur	Raja of Kolhapur; 24 Apr 1813 – 2 Jul 1821	Succeeded by Shahaji of Kolhapur
