= Indiano Bridge =

Bridge in Florence, Italy

Coordinates: 43°47′24.17″N 11°11′46.15″E

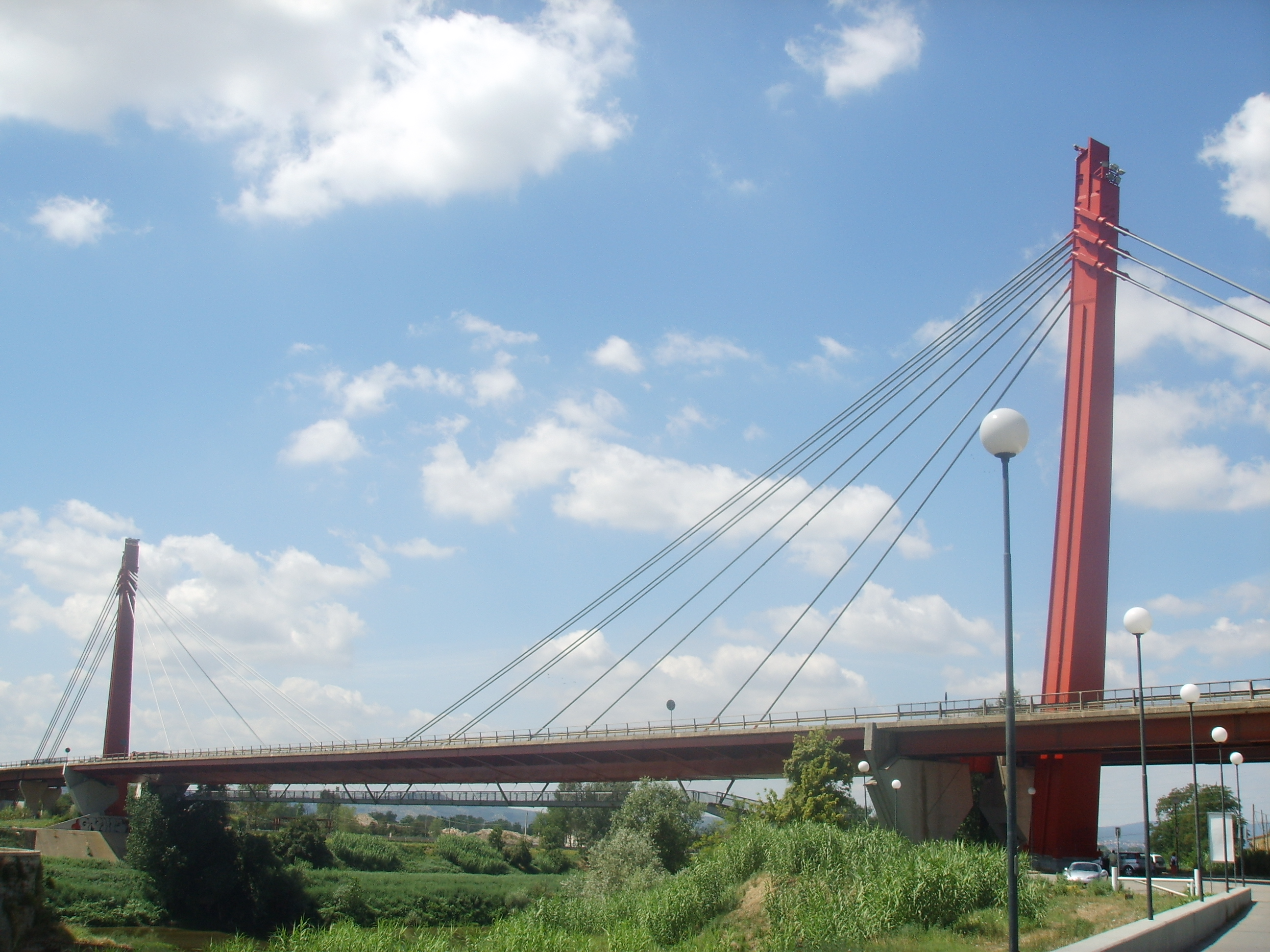
Indiano bridge

Indiano Bridge (Italian: Ponte all'Indiano) is the first earth-anchored cable-stayed bridge in the world. It is a bridge across the Arno River in Florence, Italy, near the Monument to the Indian Prince commemorating Rajaram Chhatrapati of Kolhapur.

The bridge was built between 1972 and 1978 by Società C.M.F. S.p.A. with architectural and urban architects Adriano Montemagni and Paolo Sica, and structural design engineer Fabrizio de Miranda.

The project won the national competition organized by the Municipality of Florence in 1968, and immediately attracted attention because it involved a pedestrian bridge hanging below. For the structural characteristics Fabrizio de Miranda in 1978 received the European award-CECM ECCS (European Convention for Construction Metallica). In fact it is the first cable-stayed bridge of large span anchored to the ground made the world and is one of the largest cable-stayed bridges in Italy of the twentieth century.

== Key facts ==
- Owner: Comune di Firenze (Italy)
- Contractor: C.M.F. Spa - Guasticce (Livorno - Italy)
- Structural design: Prof. Dr. ing. Fabrizio de Miranda (Milan - Italy)
- Span: 189 m (620 feet).
- Type of bridge: highway, earth anchored cable-stayed bridge with central towers and a steel stiffened plate girder composed of 2 trapezoidal box-girders connected by a cross-beams and horizontal bracings.

== Gallery ==
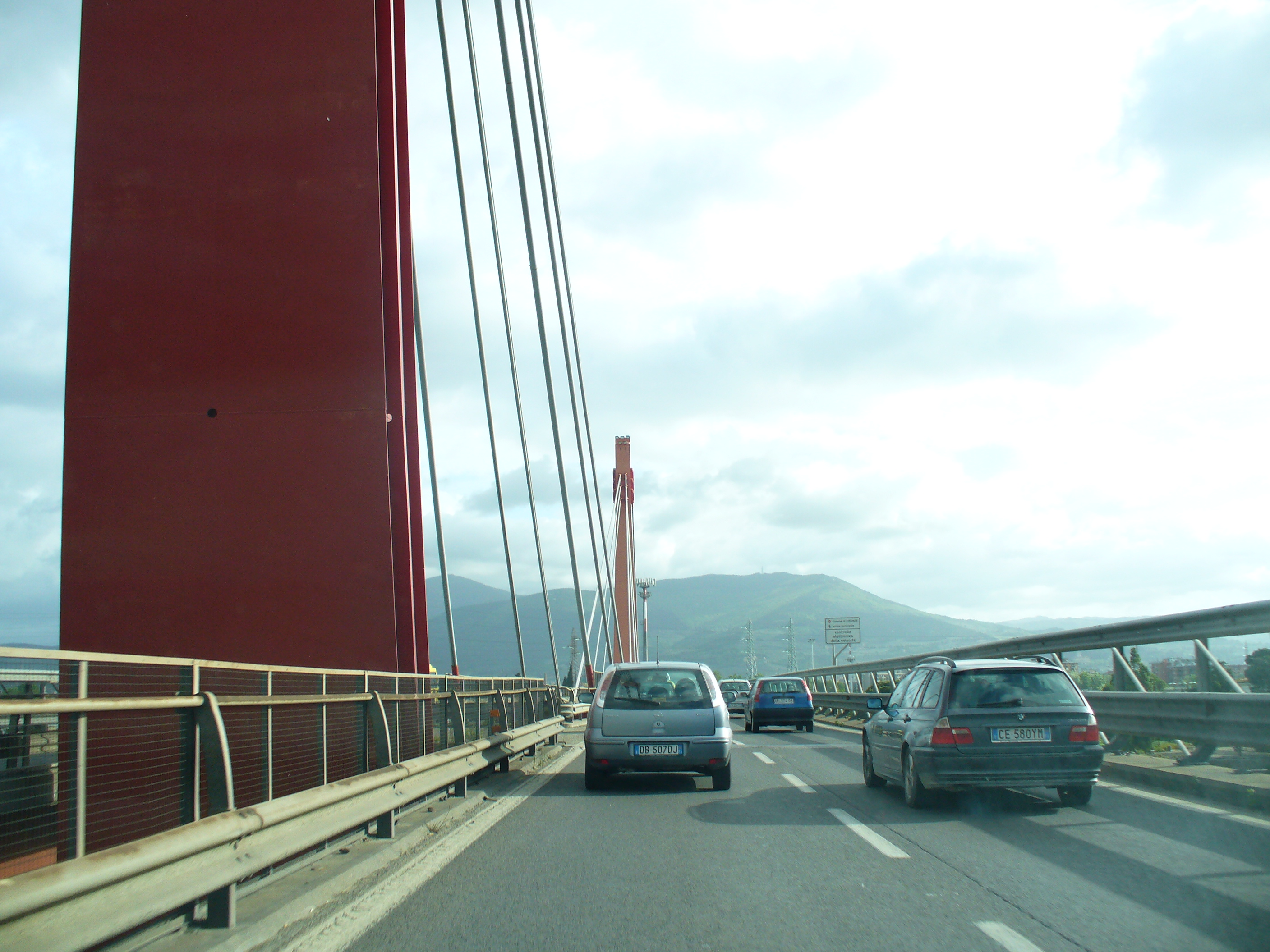
On the bridge

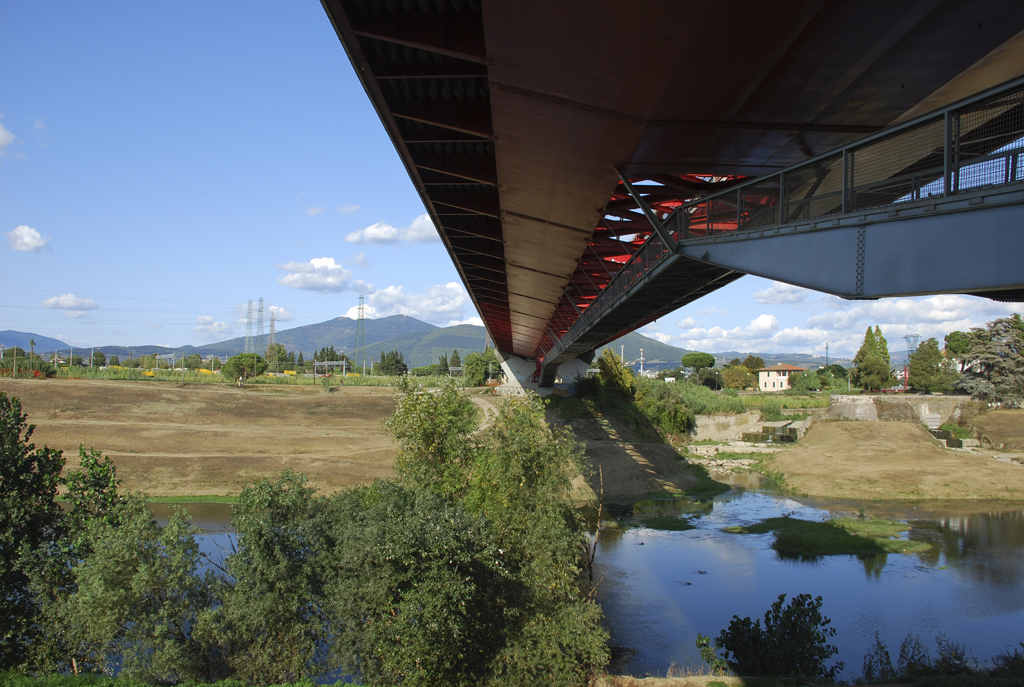
bridge

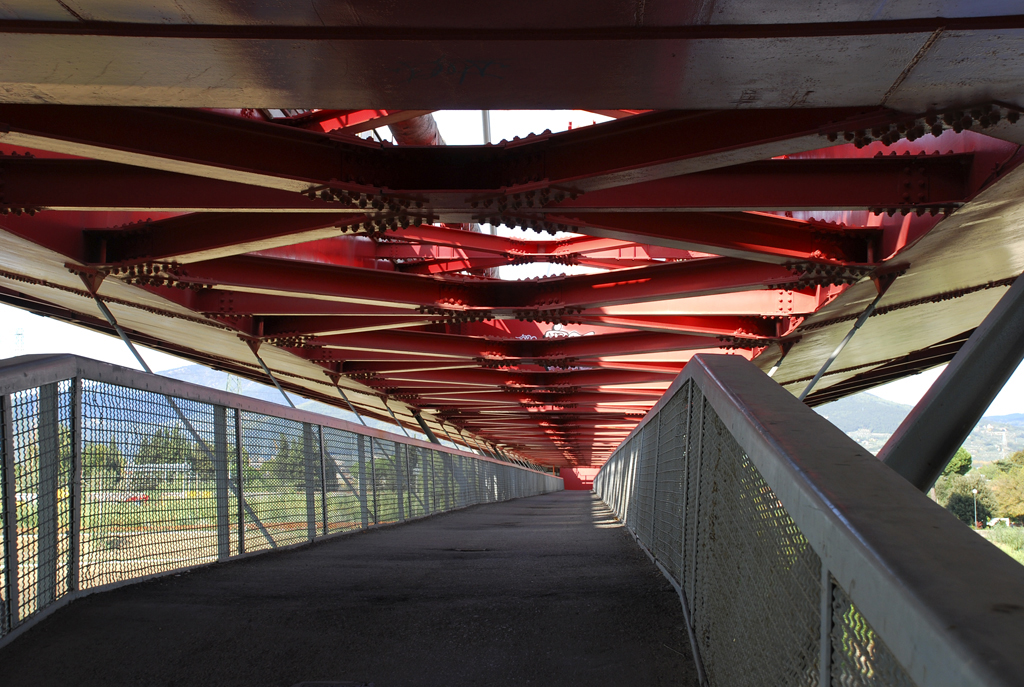
bridge

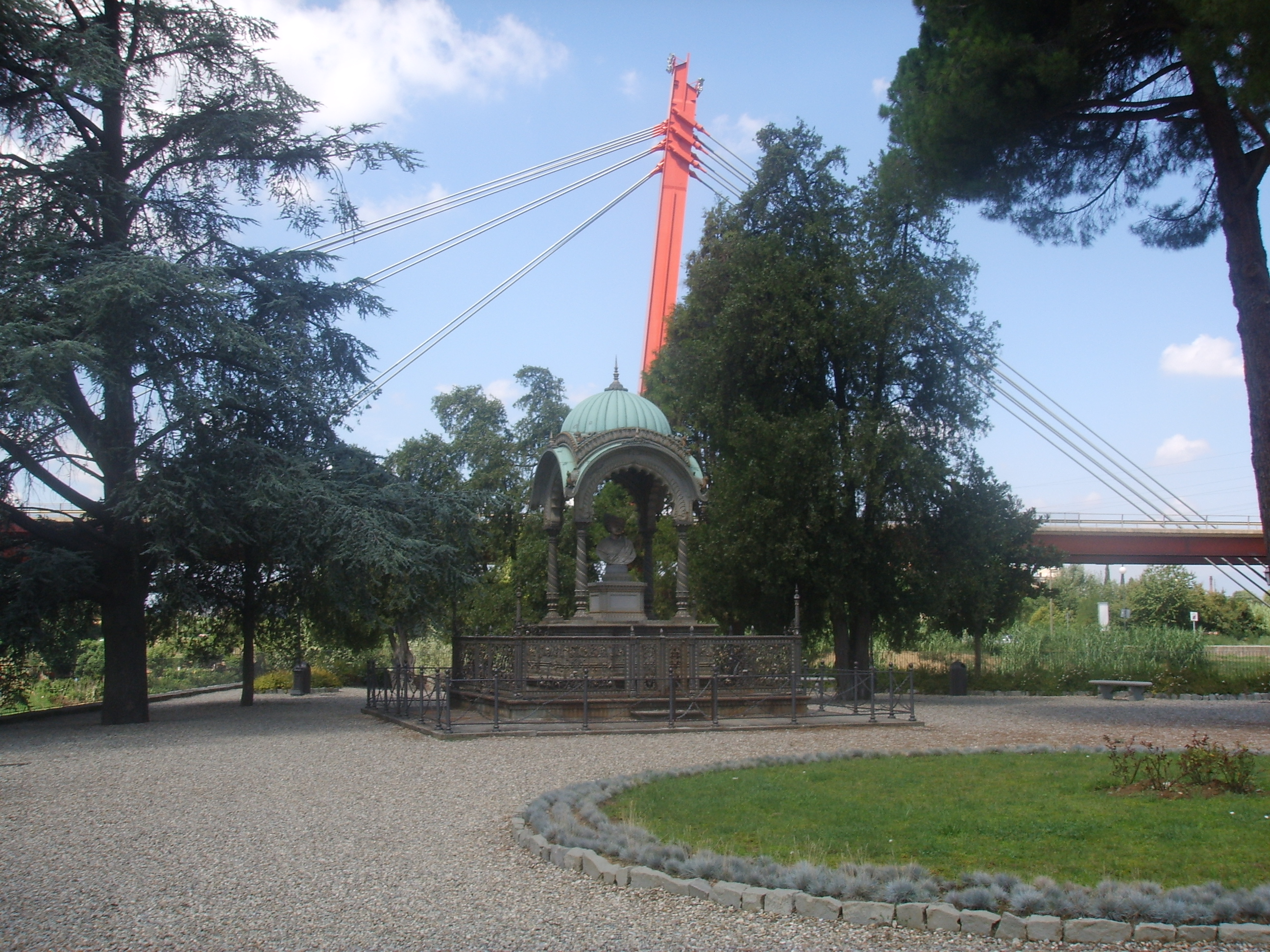
bridge

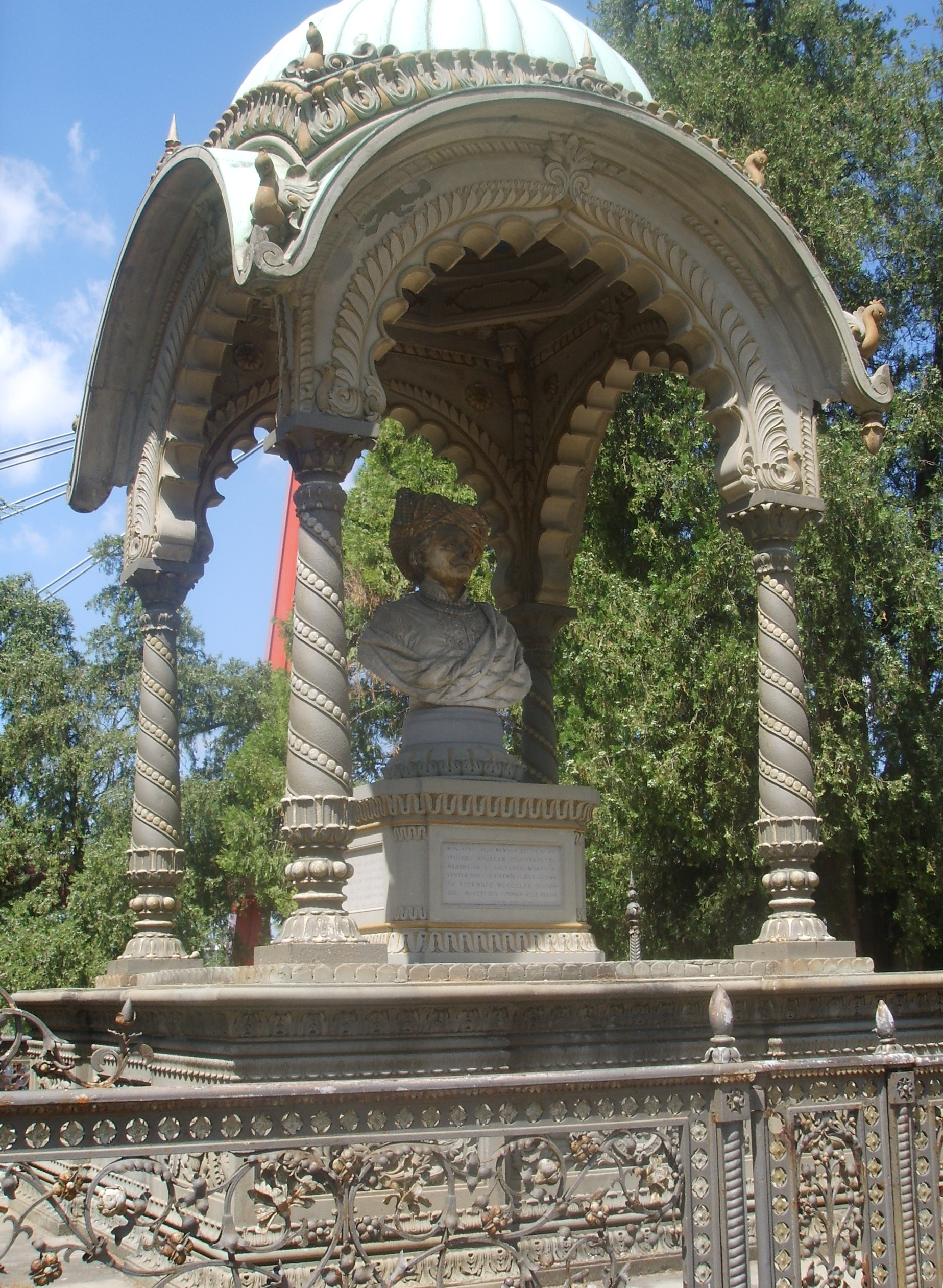
Monument to Indian prince

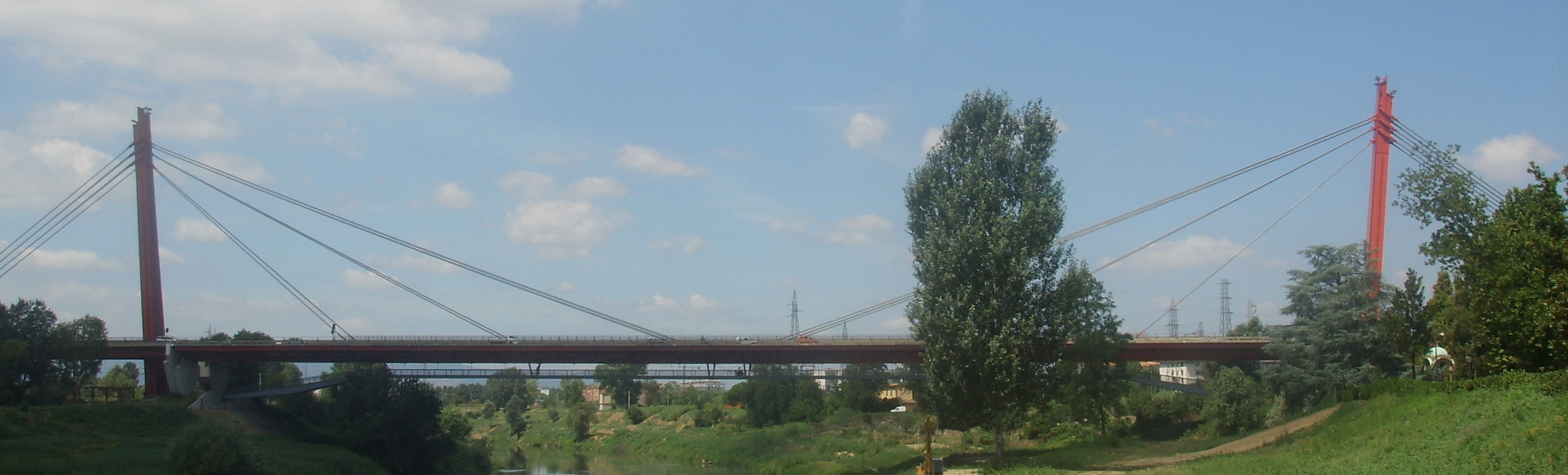
bridge
