= Shivaji I of Kolhapur =

Chhatrapati of the Marathas from 1700 to 1708

Shivaji II
- Maharaj

Chhatrapati of the Marathas
- Reign: 3 March 1700 – 12 January 1708
- Predecessor: Rajaram I
- Successor: Shahu I
- Regent: Tarabai

Raja of Kolhapur
- Reign: 1710 – 2 August 1714
- Predecessor: Position established
- Successor: Sambhaji I of Kolhapur
- Born: 6 June 1696; Gingee Fort, Maratha Kingdom (present-day Tamil Nadu, India)
- Died: 14 March 1726 (aged 29); Panhala Fort, Maratha Kingdom (present-day Maharashtra, India)
- Spouse: Bhavani Bai
- Issue: Rajaram II of Satara (disputed)
- House: Bhonsale
- Father: Rajaram I
- Mother: Tarabai
- Religion: Hinduism

Shivaji II (Shivaji Rajaram Bhonsale, Marathi pronunciation: [ʃiˈʋaːdʑiː ɾaːd͡ʒaɾaːm ˈbʱos(ə)le]; 9 June 1696 – 14 March 1726), was the fourth Chhatrapati of the Maratha Empire. He was the son of the Maratha Chhatrapati Rajaram I, and his wife Tarabai. He later became the first Raja of Kolhapur assuming the title as Shivaji I of Kolhapur.

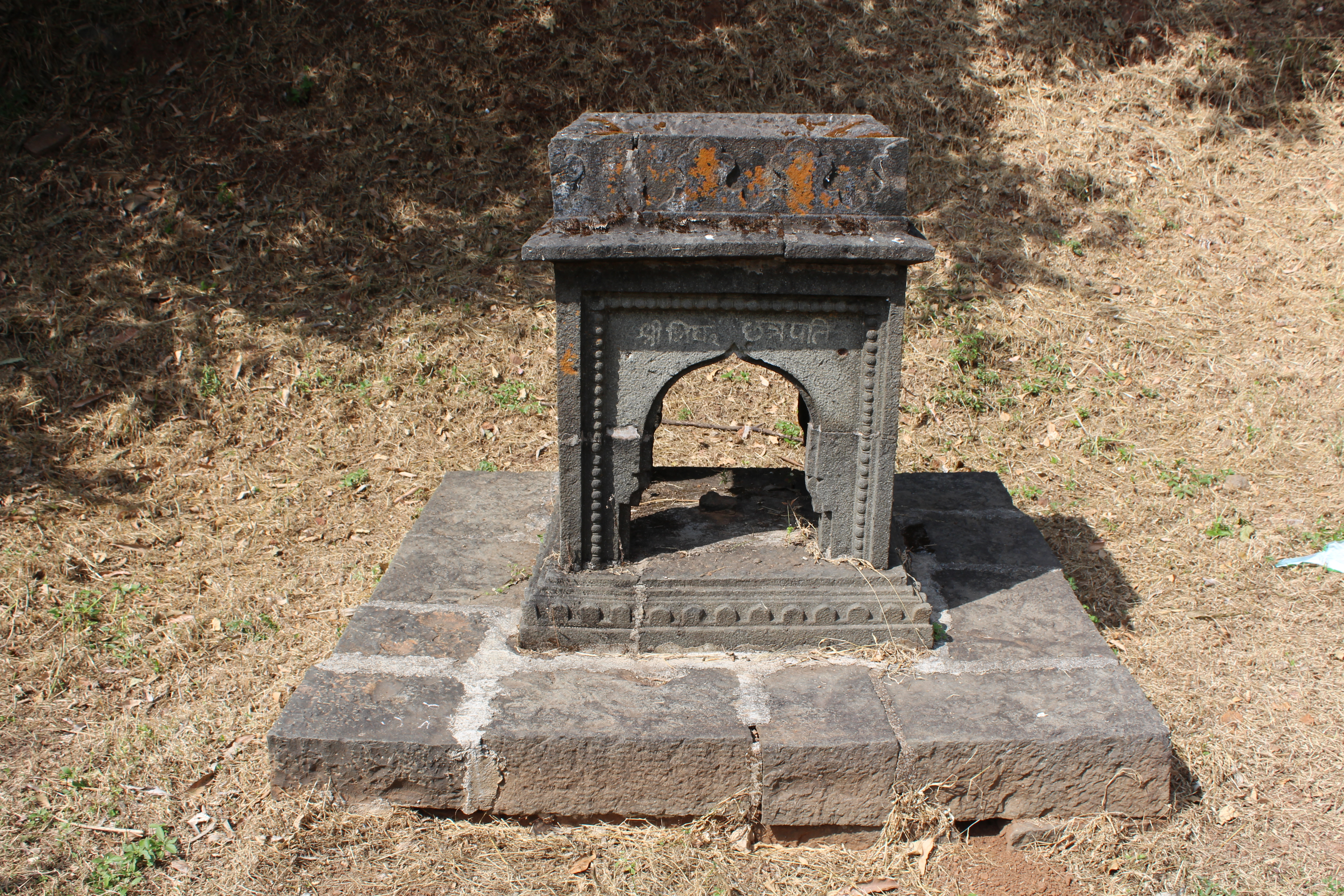
Samadhi of Shivaji I of Kolhapur, Panhala Fort

== Biography ==
He was born in Bhonsle dynasty. Upon the death of his father, the infant Shivaji was installed as the Chhatrapati of the Maratha Kingdom with his mother Tarabai serving as the regent in 1700. His cousin, Shahu I upon his release from the Mughals in 1707 successfully challenged Tarabai to become the next Chhatrapati. Tarabai then set up a rival court in Kolhapur. Shivaji II served as Raja of Kolhapur from 1710 to 1714. At that time, he was once again deposed by his step-mother Rajasbai who installed her own son, Sambhaji II on the Kolhapur throne. Shivaji died of smallpox on 14 March 1726.

== Alleged posthumous son ==
When Shahu, without a male heir to succeed to his throne, wanted to adopt a son, Tarabai disclosed in late 1740s that Shivaji II posthumously became father of a son called Rajaram II who was brought up by Nimbalkars of Phaltan, for his own protection. Shahu adopted Rajaram II who succeeded Shahu as the Chhatrapati following Shahu's death. Due to political strife between Peshwa and Tarabai, in order to delegitimise Peshwa's authority which drew from Satara Chhatrapati's own legitimacy in 1752, Tarabai made a show of oath that Rajaram II was an imposter and not her grandson. However this oath was withdrawn and Ramaraja's caste purity was asserted in public by openly dining with other Maratha lords. Ramaraja was later arrested by Tarabai and kept under house arrest until her death in 1761.

== In popular culture ==
=== Films and television ===
- In the 2017 Indian historical Peshwa Bajirao (TV series), he is portrayed by Pravisht Mishra .

Preceded by Chhattrapati Rajaram	(nominal) Chhatrapati of the Maratha Empire; 1700–1707	Succeeded by Chhattrapati Shahu

Preceded by Newly established	Raja of Kolhapur; 1710–1714	Succeeded by Sambhaji I of Kolhapur
