= Sambhaji I of Kolhapur =

Raja of Kolhapur from 1714 to 1760

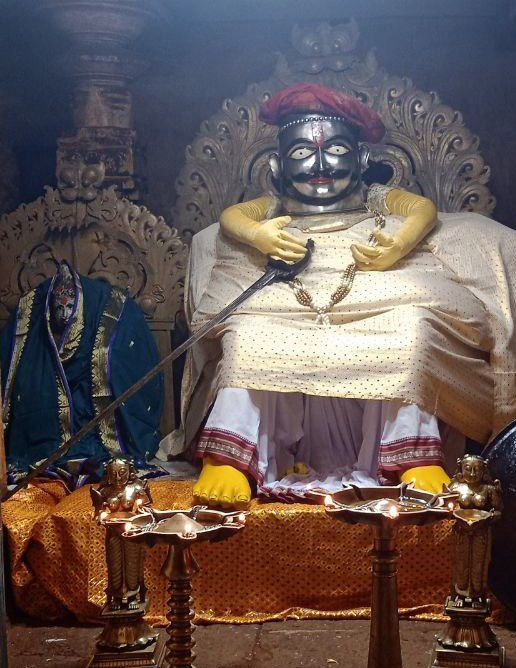
- Idols of Sambhaji I of Kolhapur with Queen Jijabai

Raja of Kolhapur
- Reign: 2 August 1714 – 18 December 1760
- Predecessor: Shivaji I of Kolhapur
- Successor: Jijabai (regent) of Shivaji II of Kolhapur
- Born: 23 May 1698; Jinji Fort (present-day Tamil Nadu, India)
- Died: 18 December 1760 (aged 62)
- Spouse: Jijibai; Kusabai
- Issue: one posthumously born daughter; Shivaji III (adopted)
- Father: Rajaram
- Mother: Rajasbai

Sambhaji I of Kolhapur (23 May 1698 – 18 December 1760) was a Raja of Kolhapur from Bhonsle dynasty. He was a grandson of Shivaji, the founder of Maratha Empire, and the second son of Chhatrapati Rajaram with his second wife, Rajasbai. After Sambhaji's stepmother, Tarabai, had been defeated by Shahu, she then set up a rival court in Kolhapur with her son Shivaji II as Raja of Kolhapur in 1710, who then ruled as Shivaji I of Kolhapur line. However, in 1714, Rajasbai instigated a coup against Tarabai and installed her own son on the Kolhapur throne. Sambhaji ruled from 1714 to 1760.

In early years of his rule, Sambhaji made alliance with the Nizam to wrest the Maratha kingdom from his cousin, Shahu. The treaty of Mungi-Shevgaon in 1728 led to the former ending his support for Sambhaji. This conflict formally came to an end in 1731 when the treaty of Warna was signed by the two sides. With this treaty both sides recognized each other claims with Shahu ceding territory between the Krishna and Tungabhadra rivers to Sambhaji. He, however, had to remain a vassal of Shahu. He was succeeded by Jijibai as a regent of Shivaji II of Kolhapur.

Sambhaji I of Kolhapur Bhonsle dynasty (Kolhapur line)
Regnal titles
Preceded by Shivaji I of Kolhapur	Raja of Kolhapur; 2 August 1714 – 18 December 1760	Succeeded by Shivaji II of Kolhapur
