= Shivaji V of Kolhapur =

Maharaja of Kolhapur from 1941 to 1946

Shivaji V
- Maharaja of Kolhapur
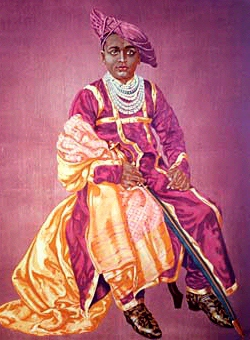

Maharaja of Kolhapur
- Reign: 31 December 1941 – 28 September 1946
- Predecessor: Rajaram II
- Successor: Shahaji II
- Born: 22 November 1941
- Died: 28 September 1946 (aged 4); Bombay, British Raj
- Religion: Hinduism

Shivaji V (22 November 1941 – 28 September 1946), also known as Pratapsing, was the Maharaja of Kolhapur from 1941 to 1946. He was adopted by Maharani Tarabai, the widow of Rajaram Chhatrapati II, who left no male heir. He was from the Khanwatkar branch of the Bhonsle dynasty.

His father was Nanahaseb Shankarrao Bhosle Chavrekar. In 1946, he died in Bombay at the age of 4, and was succeeded by Shahaji II.

Shivaji V of Kolhapur Bhonsle Dynasty (Kolhapur line) Born: 22 November 1941 Died: 28 September 1946
Regnal titles
Preceded by Rajaram II of Kolhapur (as Maharaja of Kolhapur)	Maharaja of Kolhapur; 1941–1946	Succeeded by Shahaji II
