= New Palace, Kolhapur =

Palace in Kolhapur, Maharashtra, India

Coordinates: 16.718735°N 74.233344°E

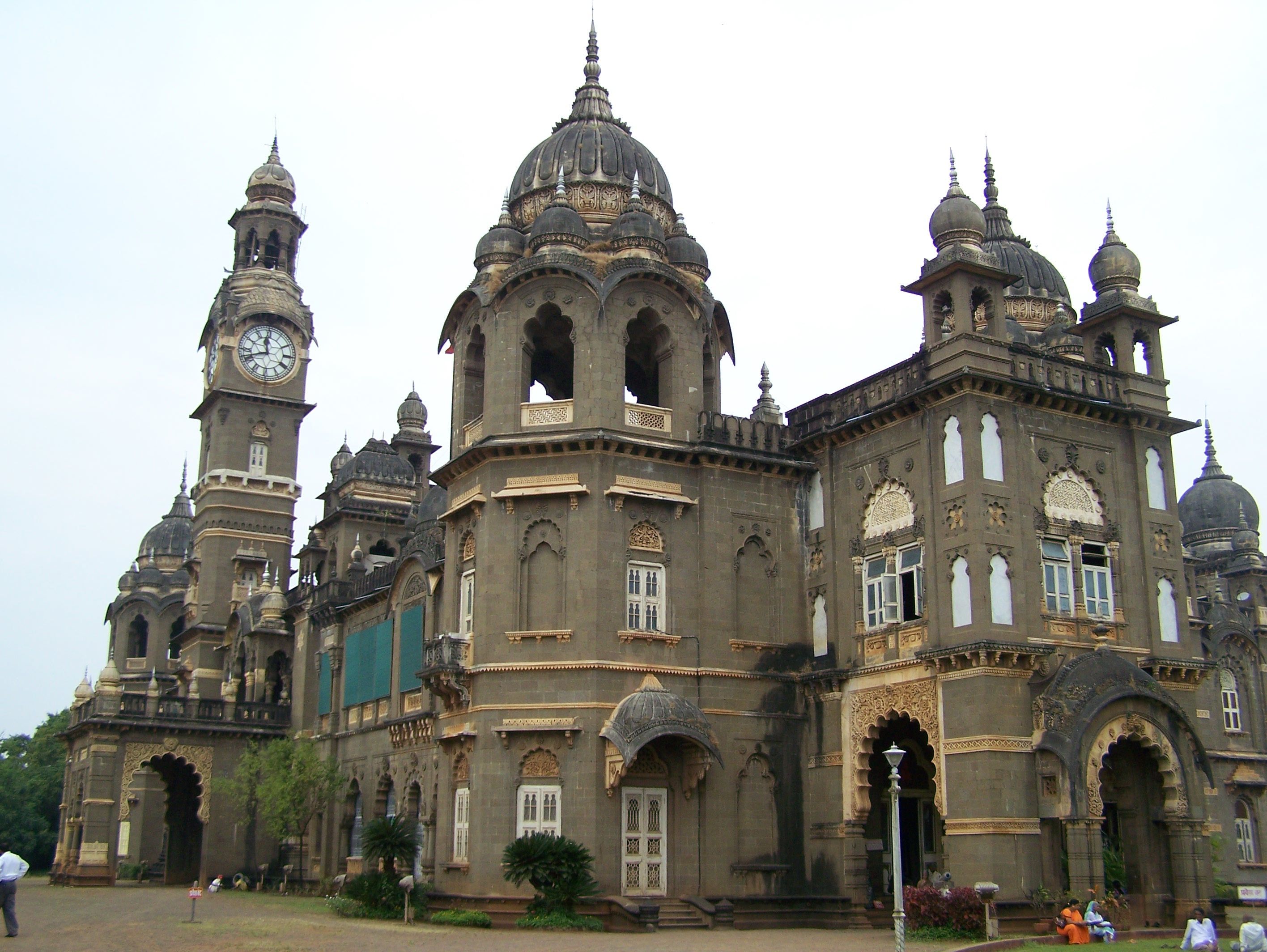
- The new palace, Kolhapur
- Location: New Palace, Kolhapur, Maharashtra 416003, India

New Palace, Kolhapur is a palace situated in Kolhapur, in the Indian state of Maharashtra. The Palace took 7 years to complete, from 1877 to 1884, costing about seven lakhs of rupees. Built in black polished stone, it has been an attraction for tourists. It has extensive premises with a garden, fountain and wrestling ground. The whole building is eight-angled and has a tower in the middle. The clock on it was fixed in 1877. At separate distances there are small towers. On every glass are painted the events of Chhatrapati Shivaji Maharaj's life, the founder of Maratha Confederacy. There is a zoo and a ground lake. Today, it is the residence of Shahu, the direct descendant of Chhatrapati Shivaji Maharaj.

Completed in the same year as the Hospital, this complex features in contrasting basalt and sandstone. The principal south facade presents a double-storeyed range, with Neo-Mughal lobed arches beneath and temple-like columns and brackets above. This scheme is interrupted by trefoil arches capped with curving cornices and small domes. The same elements cap the octagonal corner towers.

The ground floor of the New Palace accommodates the Shahaji Museum, given over to memorabilia of the Kolhapur rulers. Several tourists from across the country visit the New Palace each year. This museum exhibits royal ways of existence.

It is dedicated to a fine collection of possessions of Chhatrapatis of Kolhapur like costumes, weapons, games, jewellery, embroidery and paraphernalia such as silver elephant saddles. A letter from the British Viceroy and Governor General of India is the other memorabilia. There is also one of Aurangzeb's swords at the Shahaji Chhatrapati Museum. One section has stuffed Tigers, Tiger heads, Wild Dog, Sloth Bear, staring Wild Buffalo, Lion, Black Panther, Wild Boar, Black Buck, a number of other Deer varieties, and a Himalayan Black Bear.

The Darbar Hall occupies a double-height space in middle of the Palace. The side walls display lobed arches filled with stained glass illustrating scenes from the life of Shivaji; carved columns with temple-like brackets support the cast iron balcony above. A raised throne is placed at one end of the Hall. Photos include one of the Maharaja with his hundredth dead tiger, elephant hunts and a series detailing how to train a cheetah.

== See also ==
- Maratha Empire
- Kolhapur State
- Shahu II of Kolhapur
- Sambhaji Raje
