= Shivaji II of Kolhapur =

Raja of Kolhapur from 1762 to 1813

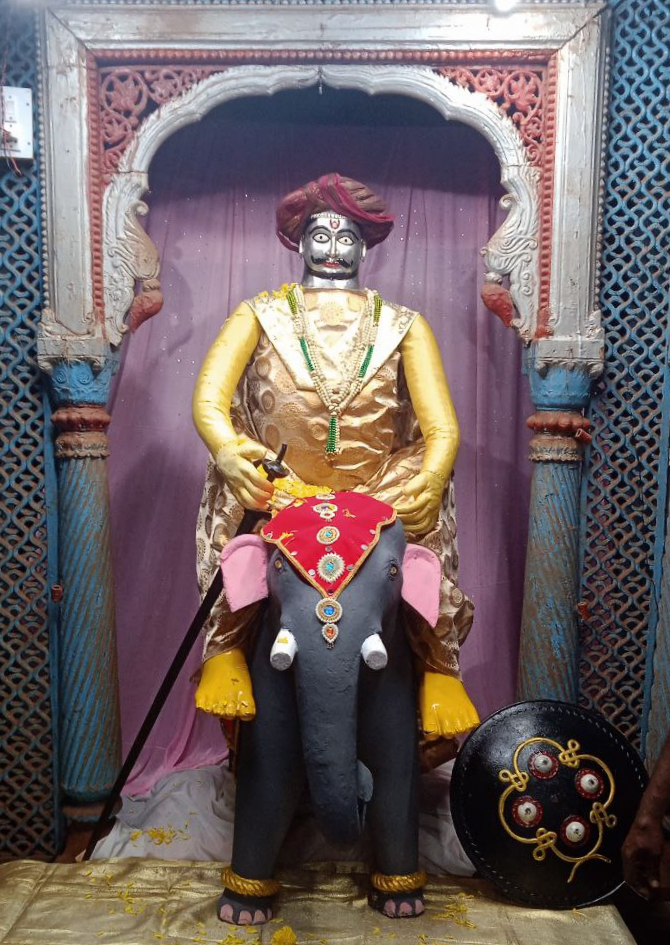

Raja of Kolhapur
- Reign: 22 September 1762 – 24 April 1813
- Predecessor: Sambhaji II
- Successor: Sambhaji III
- Born: 1756
- Died: 24 April 1813 (aged 56–57)

Shivaji II of Kolhapur (1756 – 24 April 1813) was a Raja of Kolhapur from 22 September 1762 until his death on 24 April 1813, belonging to the Bhonsle dynasty.

Shivaji II of Kolhapur Bhonsle dynasty (Kolhapur line)
Regnal titles
Preceded by Sambhaji I of Kolhapur (as Raja of Kolhapur)	Raja of Kolhapur; 22 September 1762 – 24 April 1813	Succeeded by Sambhaji III
