= Shahaji of Kolhapur =

Raja of Kolhapur from 1822 to 1838

Shahaji (22 January 1802 – 29 November 1838) was Raja of Kolhapur of Bhonsle dynasty. He was as regent from 2 July 1821 to 3 January 1822 and ruled as monarch from 3 January 1822 to 29 November 1838. He was succeeded by Shivaji III.

Shahaji of Kolhapur Bhonsle dynasty (Kolhapur line)
Regnal titles
Preceded by Sambhaji II of Kolhapur	Raja of Kolhapur; 3 January 1822 – 29 November 1838	Succeeded by Shivaji III of Kolhapur
