= Rajaram II of Kolhapur =

Chhatrapati Rajaram Maharaj
- Maharaja of Kolhapur
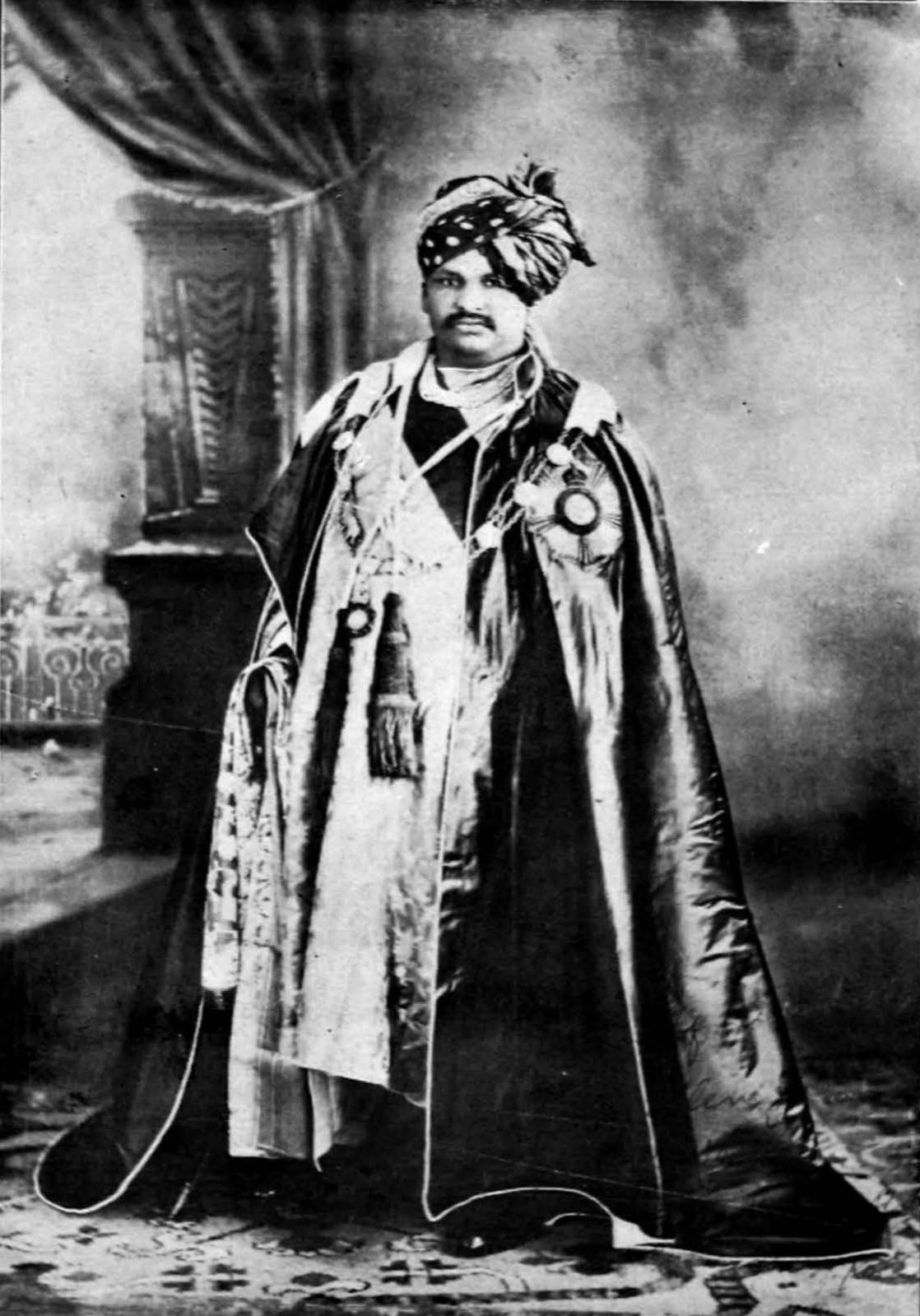
- Rajaram II c. 1937
- Predecessor: Shahu of Kolhapur
- Successor: Shivaji V of Kolhapur
- Born: 30 July 1897
- Died: 26 November 1940 (aged 43)

Chhatrapati Rajaram Maharaj (30 July 1897 – 26 November 1940), also known as Sir Shri Rajaram or Rajaram II of Kolhapur, was the maharaja of the princely state of Kolhapur, India, from 1922 to 1940. He introduced educational reforms including a free compulsory primary school system and affordable higher education. He also modernised public infrastructure including the water supply system and built new housing colonies. During his reign, he was the only princely ruler in India to have his powers expanded by the British Raj.

The Kolhapur Airport, officially known as the Chhatrapati Rajaram Maharaj Airport, is named after him.

== Early life and education ==
Born on 30 July 1897, Rajaram was the eldest son of Rajarshi Chhatrapati Shahu Maharaj. In his youth, Rajaram was known by the name Jayasingrao.

As ruler of the princely state of Kolhapur, his father Shahu was known as a social reformer. His younger brother Shivaji was born on 15 April 1899. They had a sister named Radhabai.

=== Private tutor in Kolhapur ===
As children, Rajaram and Shivaji were taught privately by Indian tutors as well as a Scottish woman named Mrs. Irwin. Rajaram had been ill as an infant, and in 1907, his father wrote that he preferred to have his eldest son tutored at home rather than sending him to Rajkumar College in Rajkot because he was protective of his health.

In his early teens, Rajaram became active in sports and was a keen cricketer and hunter (shikari). On 2 April 1911, Prince Rajaram performed the opening ceremony for Shri Namdev Boarding, a boarding house for learners set up by leaders in the Shimpi community. In January 1912, Rajaram captured a tiger which was 7 feet, six inches, in the jungles of Tumjai.

=== Education in England ===
On 11 May 1912, Rajaram and Shivaji departed for England, where they attended Burnham House, a preparatory school in Hendon, Middlesex. There, they played football. In January 1914, Rajaram was enrolled at St Edward's School, Oxford, while Shivaji went to King Edward's School in Bromsgrove.

Seven months later, following the outbreak of the First World War, their father Shahu wrote to Colonel Wodehouse, the Resident, to offer his sons' support for England in the war effort, saying that he would recall them to India if they were not utilised.

=== Return to India ===
In 1915, the two brothers returned to India, after having travelled through the United States, Japan, and China. They studied agriculture at the Ewing Christian College in Allahabad for one year before returning to Kolhapur for health reasons. On 12 June 1918, Shivaji died after being thrown by his horse while pig-sticking.

== Reign ==
Upon his return to Kolhapur, Rajaram learned about government administration under officers of the state. On 31 May 1922, at age 25, Rajaram succeeded his father Chhatrapati Rajarshi Shahu, ascending the gadi as Maharaja of Kolhapur. As maharaja, he enjoyed a 19-guns salute.

=== Education reforms ===
Like his father, Chhatrapati Rajaram Maharaj supported social uplift and education. He made primary education compulsory and available for free. He made secondary and higher education more affordable, and made higher education free for women.

Rajaram presided over numerous conferences including the Non-brahmin Convention in Satara in 1922; the All-India Maratha Educational Conference in 1924; and the All-India Non-brahmin conference at Amravati in 1926. In 1935, he inaugurated the annual convention of the literary organisation Marathi Sahitya Sammelan in Kolhapur.

=== Public works ===
Chhatrapati Rajaram Maharaj modernised public infrastructure in Kolhapur state, building a modern water supply system and widening streets. He donated 170 acres of land for the development of an airport in Kolhapur and inaugurated an airstrip in May 1940.

In addition, Rajaram established modern housing colonies (vasahat) in Lakshmipuri, Tarabai Park, and Rajarampuri. He is also credited with making a land grant to develop the colony that became Mukt Sainik Vasahat, home to veterans who fought with the British Army during the Second World War.

=== Democratic reforms ===
During the reign of Chhatrapati Rajaram Maharaj, there were several democratic reforms in Kolhapur. The municipality of Kolhapur became an elected body in 1925. An ilakha panchayat system was set up for the entire state for the administration of public health, temples, and other services.

In 1931, a High Court and a Court of Appeals were set up in Kolhapur.

=== Relationship with British government ===
In the 1930s, the powers of the British Resident were transferred to the Maharaja of Kolhapur. Starting 1 April 1933, the Maharaja of Kolhapur had more direct dealings with the British Viceroy, rather than having to go through the Political Department of the Government of Bombay.

=== Sports ===
Like his father, Chhatrapati Rajaram Maharaj was a patron of the sport of wrestling. He owned race horses. During his reign, Kolhapur became well known for the sports of cheetah-hunting and pig-sticking. In 1940, the Kolhapur Sports Association was established under his patronage.

== Honours ==
- Knight Grand Commander of the Order of the Indian Empire (GCIE), 1924 Birthday Honours
- Knight Grand Commander of the Order of the Star of India (GCSI), 1931

== Personal life ==
As yuwaraj (crown prince), Rajaram married the daughter of Yuwaraj Fattesing, heir apparent to Maharaja Sayajirao Gaekwad of Baroda, in 1919. His first wife became known as Tarabai.

In 1925, Rajaram took a second wife, who became known as Vijaymala. She was the daughter of Atmaramrao Mohite of Tanjawar.

On 5 October 1940, Maharani Tarabai gave birth to a daughter, Padmaraje.

== Death and legacy ==
Chhatrapati Rajaram Maharaj died in Bombay on 26 November 1940, after undergoing a minor medical operation there. He had traveled to Bombay on his way back from unveiling a statue in Gwalior.

Having died without a male heir, in 1942, his wife Maharani Tarabai adopted a son who became known as Shivaji V of Kolhapur, to succeed him.

In 2019, Kolhapur Airport was officially renamed the Chhatrapati Rajaram Maharaj Airport after him.

Rajaram II of Kolhapur Bhonsle Dynasty (Kolhapur line) Born: 31 July 1897 Died: 26 November 1940
Regnal titles
Preceded by Shahu (as Maharaja of Kolhapur)	Maharaja of Kolhapur; 1922–1940	Succeeded by Shivaji V
