= Rajaram I of Kolhapur =

Raja of Kolhapur from 1866 to 1870

Rajaram Chhatrapati
- Raja of Kolhapur
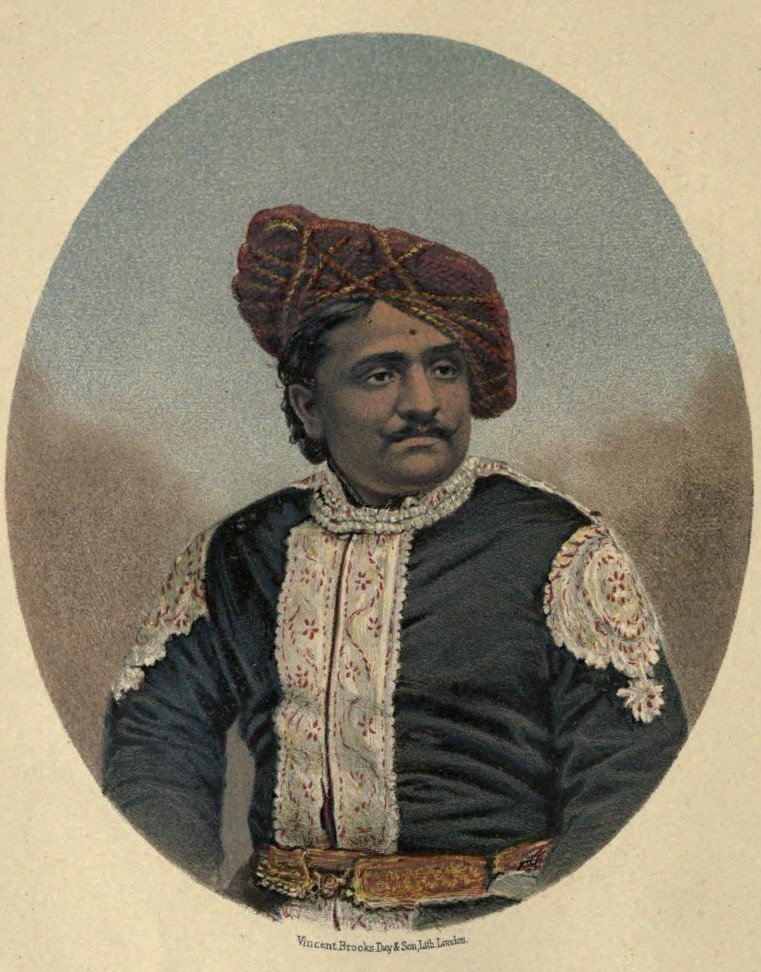
- Portrait from his posthumously published diary (1872)
- Predecessor: Shivaji III of Kolhapur
- Successor: Shivaji IV of Kolhapur
- Born: Nagojirao Patankar; 13 April 1850
- Died: 30 November 1870 (aged 20); Florence, Italy

Rajaram Chhatrapati (13 April 1850 – 30 November 1870), also known as Rajaram I of Kolhapur, was the Raja of Kolhapur, India, from 1866 to 1870. He was one of the first princely rulers in colonial India to sail overseas, despite Hindu norms at the time against crossing oceans to foreign shores. In 1870, he travelled to Europe, spending four months in England, and kept a diary. He died toward the end of his trip in Florence, Italy, at the age of 20. Two years after his death, his diary was published posthumously in English.

Rajaram High School and Rajaram College at Kolhapur were named after him. In 1874, a monument to Rajaram Chhatrapati was erected in Florence. A Marathi translation of his travel diary was published in 2025.

== Early life ==
Born Nagojirao Patankar in 1850, he was the son of Ramachandrarao Patankar of Patan and Aubai, the elder sister of Babasaheb Maharaj. On 1 August 1866, at age 16, he was adopted by his uncle and took the name Rajaram. Three days later, his uncle Babasaheb Maharaj (Shivaji III of Kolhapur) died.

Due to his young age, Rajaram Chhatrapati was put under supervision of the British authorities, who planned to rule until he came of age. The government of India appointed Colonel G. S. Anderson as chief administrator, while Captain Edward West became guardian-companion to Rajaram. Rajaram was moved from the palace, where his mother and aunt lived, to a nearby bungalow. Following the death of his aunt Akkasaheb, two of his cousins – Abasaheb, age 10, and his sister, age 8 – came to live with him.

=== Education ===
Jamshetji Naroji Unwala, a Parsi scholar who held a master of arts degree from Bombay University, was hired as his tutor. Rajaram was already able to speak and read English, and progressed quickly. He played billiards, cricket, and croquet.

== Official events ==
Within two months of becoming the Raja in 1866, the Governor of Bombay, Sir Bartle Frere, held a durbar at Poona in his honour. Rajaram replied to the governor's address in English. He was presented with robes and given a 17-gun salute. The following year, the British government of India revised its list of gun salutes and determined that the Chhatrapatis of Kolhapur would receive a 19-gun salute thereafter.

On 19 February 1870, Rajaram laid the foundation stone for a new building to house Kolhapur High School. He had made land available for the expansion by approving the demolition of several houses adjoining the palace. It was likely the last major event he presided over in public.

On 21 February 1870, the Rajaram Chhatrapati went to Bombay to see Alfred, the Duke of Edinburgh, and son of Queen Victoria. To commemorate the duke's visit to India, upon his return to Kolhapur, Rajaram announced a donation to fund six annual scholarship grants to local students. The meeting with the Duke of Edinburgh also helped to consolidate plans for Rajaram to visit England, a wish that he had expressed previously. Until then, the possibility of Rajaram making the trip had seemed unlikely due to prevailing Hindu norms against sea voyages, the need for approval from the Political Department, and the logistical challenges of catering for a Marathi prince abroad.

== Travel to Europe ==
In late May 1870, Rajaram Chhatrapati set out for his grand tour of Europe, keeping a travel diary in English. He was accompanied by Colonel West, his tutor Jamshetji Unwala, and 11 attendants. He arrived in Paris on 12 June and at Charing Cross railway station in London on 14 June 1870.

Rajaram stayed in England for a period of four months. He attended a ball hosted by Queen Victoria, and visited her at Windsor. In London, Rajaram Chhatrapati visited both Houses of Parliament, sat in on cases at various Magistrates' courts, and attended a state concert at Buckingham Palace. He was at the opening of the trans-ocean telegraph to India, and wrote that he was impressed that the Prince of Wales received a reply to his telegram from the Viceroy of India within five minutes. Other places he visited included Westminster Abbey, St Paul's Cathedral, the Tower of London, the British Museum, The Crystal Palace, Madame Tussauds, Lord's cricket ground, Kew Gardens, and Hampton Court Palace. He also wrote about spending time in London parks.

He visited the University of Oxford where he met the Vice Chancellor and some faculty. He travelled to Liverpool, Manchester, Glasgow, and Holyhead by train. In the Midlands, he visited a factory that manufactured railway equipment and other machinery, as well as a cotton mill. In Scotland, he visited Loch Ness, went to Inverness. From Holyhead, he took a ferry to Dublin, Ireland, which made him seasick.

Toward the end of his trip, he visited the Maharaja Duleep Singh who was living at Elveden, Suffolk. He departed England on 1 November 1870. Instead of returning to India via Paris, his party traveled through Belgium, the Tyrol, and Italy, due to the Franco-Prussian War. On 9 November 1870, they arrived in Munich. On 11 November 1870, Rajaram made his final diary entry, concluding with the words: "Today is the first time I have seen snow falling."

=== Illness and death ===
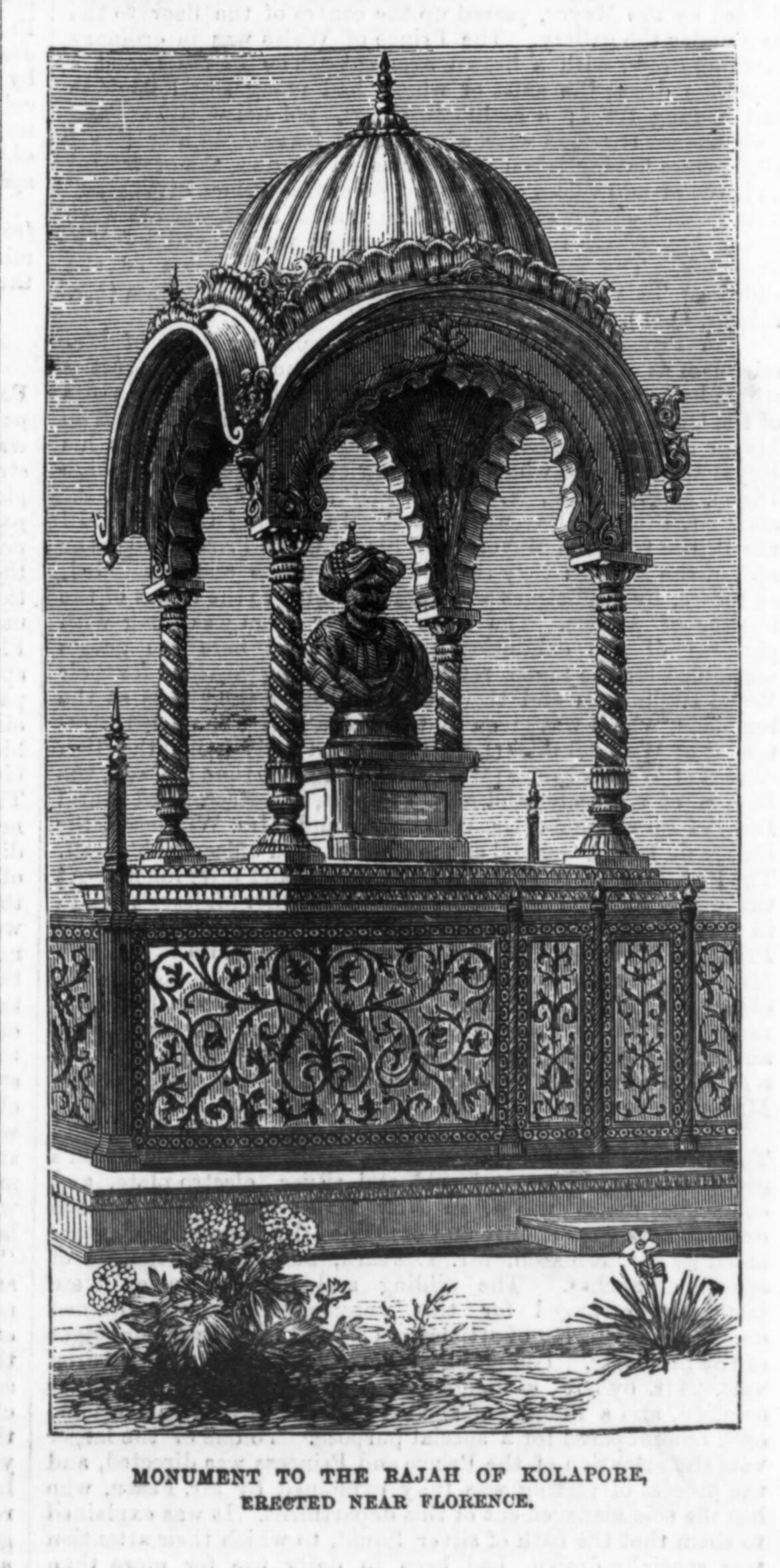
Illustration of Monumento all'Indiano (1874)

While in Innsbruck on 13 November 1870, Rajaram fell ill with a fever, which worsened into rheumatism. On 16 November, he was still unwell and had to be carried in a chair to the station, traveling through the Brenner Pass and arriving in Bolzano. From there, they traveled to Venice, where he visited the Palace of the Doge and the Piazza San Marco carried in a sedan chair.

On 30 November 1870, Rajaram Chhatrapati died aged 20 in Florence, Italy. The next day, his body was cremated on the banks of the Arno River according to Hindu funeral rites, by special permission from the Council of Ministers of Italy. The cremation was permitted following the intervention of British minister Sir Augustus Paget, as the Catholic Church had frowned on cremation for centuries and municipal law at the time in Florence did not allow anything other than burial in a coffin.

Four years after his death, a monument to Rajaram Chhatrapati was erected in Florence, at the spot where the cremation ceremony had been performed, near the present-day Ponte all'Indiano (Indiano Bridge) over the Arno river. Called the Monument to the Indian, it has a canopy structure designed by Bengal engineer Charles Mant and bust of Rajaram by sculptor Charles Francis Fuller.

== Personal life and legacy ==
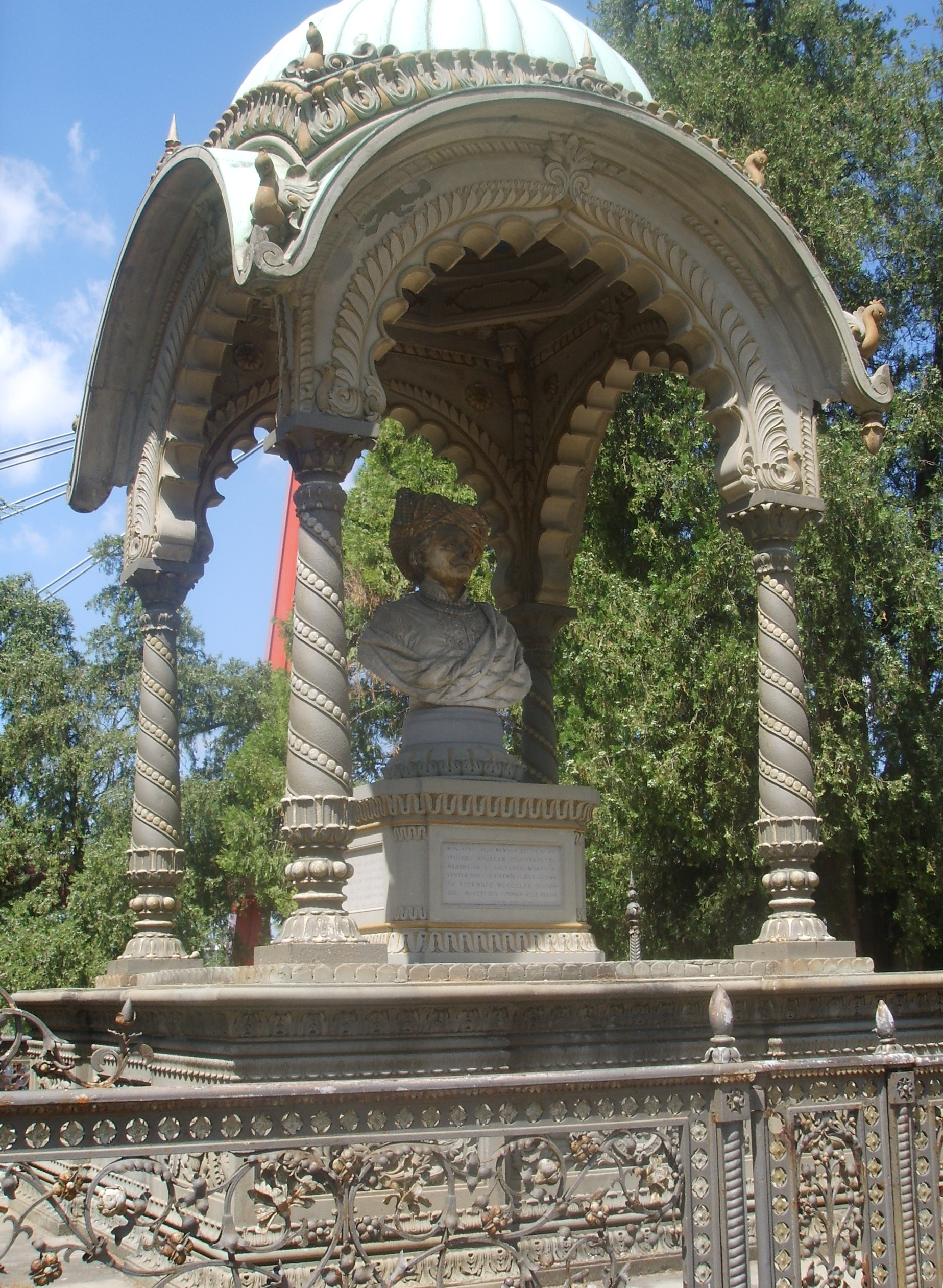
Monumento all'Indiano, Florence in 2006

Rajaram had two wives. In March 1867, he married the eight-year-old daughter of Mudhojirao Naik Nimbalkar of Phaltan, who took the name Tarabai. Later that year, he married his second wife, who took the name Sakwarbai. She was the sister of Gopalrao Sarlashkar. In 1870, Sakwarbai gave birth to a girl who died as an infant.

In the absence of a direct heir, the Rajaram Chhatrapati was eventually succeeded by Shivaji IV, a young prince who was adopted by his widow Rani Tarabai. His legacy included the renaming of Kolhapur High School as Rajaram High School, as well as Rajaram College.

=== Publication of diary ===
In 1872, the diary of Rajaram Chhatrapati of Kolhapur was published in English, edited by Captain Edward West. The original title of the book was Diary of the late Rajah of Kolhapoor, during his visit to Europe in 1870.

His diary was later translated into Marathi by Raghunath Kadakane of Rajaram College in Kolhapur and published by Shivaji University, Kolhapur in 2025.

== See also ==
- Monumento all'Indiano, Florence

Rajaram I of Kolhapur Bhonsle dynasty (Kolhapur line) Born: 13 April 1850 Died: 30 November 1870
Regnal titles
Preceded by Shivaji III of Kolhapur	Raja of Kolhapur; 1866–1871	Succeeded by Shivaji IV
