= Shivaji III of Kolhapur =

Raja of Kolhapur from 1838 to 1866

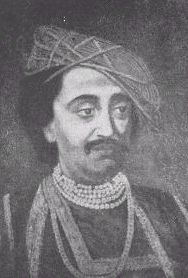
Babahaseb Maharaj

Babasaheb Maharaj (26 December 1830 – 4 August 1866), also known as Shivaji III, was Raja of Kolhapur of the Bhonsle dynasty. He ruled from 1838 to 1866. During his reign, he was granted a personal salute of 19 guns with a hereditary salute of 17 guns. He was succeeded by Rajaram I of Kolhapur.

== Personal life ==
Shivaji III married twice:

- 1. Sundrabai Bhonsle (1835–1866). Married at Kolhapur in 1847 and had two sons:
  - 1. Yuvraj Shahaji Bhonsle(24 August 1848 – March 1849)
  - 2. Maharajkumar...(no name) (1855–1857)
- 2. Ahilyabai Barodekarin Bhonsle (1842–1895). Daughter of Ganpatrao Gaekwad, Maharaja of Baroda. Married at Baroda 1854 and had one son:
  - Maharajkumar...(no name) (1858–1863)

== Titles ==
- 1830–1838: Yuvraj Shivaji Bhonsle
- 1838 – 24 May 1866: Shivaji III Shahaji Raja of Kolhapur
- 24 May – 4 August 1866: Shivaji III Shahaji Raja of Kolhapur, KCSI

== Honours ==
- Knight Commander of the Order of the Star of India (KCSI), 1866

Shivaji III of Kolhapur Bhonsle dynasty (Kolhapur line) Born: 26 December 1830 Died: 4 August 1866
Regnal titles
Preceded by Shahaji (as Raja of Kolhapur)	Raja of Kolhapur; 1838–1866	Succeeded by Rajaram I of Kolhapur
