= Ratoji Bhoite Patil =

Ratoji Bhoite

General of Maratha Army
- Monarch: Shivaji I

Personal details
- Occupation: Military Commander

Military service
- Allegiance: Maratha Empire
- Service: Maratha Army

Ratoji Bhoite inamdaar was a Maratha sardar (Maratha Knight) who served Bahamani Sultanates of Deccan. He then joined Chhatrapati Shivaji Bhosales Swarajya Campaign in the 17th century. He was an ancestor of Bhoite families of Tadawale. Ratoji was inamdar of Tadawale and surrounding areas concluding villages of current North Koregaon area. He also had command over Fort Nandgiri (Kalyangad). He started his career as shiledar of Sultanates as his forefathers were. His descendants were to play an important part in Marathas' subsequent history.
