= Saranjam =

Saranjam may refer to:

- Saranjam, a grant of land ruled by a Saranjamdar during the former Maratha Empire occupied regions of India
  - Bhoite Saranjam, a political saranjam in the Bombay Presidency.
- Kalâm-e Saranjâm, (کلام سرانجام) "The Discourse of Conclusion", the central religious text of the Ahl-e Haqq in Kurdish literature

== See also ==
- Anjam (disambiguation)
