= Damaji Thorat =

18th-century Maratha chief

- Rustumrao

Saranjamdar of the Maratha Empire
- Predecessor: Khandoji Thorat
- Successor: Saranjam abolished
- Died: 1728; Purandar, Maratha Empire (present-day Maharashtra, India)
- Spouse: Radhabai
- Issue: Ransing; Bhansing; Khandoji; Chandrabhan
- House: Thorat
- Father: Khandoji
- Religion: Hinduism

Damaji Thorat (Marathi pronunciation: [d̪əmaːd͡ʒi t̪ʰoːɾaːt̪]; was a Maratha chief who rose to prominence during the reign of Tarabai in the early 18th century. He joined Dhanaji Jadhav in his campaign across Khandesh, Baglan, and Gujarat from 1704 to 1708. When Shahu I arrived in the Deccan to assert his claim to the throne, Damaji supported Tarabai against Shahu. In 1711, he defeated and captured Balaji Vishwanath and Shahu's Pant Sachiv, later releasing them for a substantial ransom. After this incident, in 1713, Shahu, with the assistance of the Sayyid brothers, sent his Huzurat cavalry under the command of Balaji Vishwanath & Ambaji Purandare to defeat Damaji. Balaji besieged the fortress of Hingangaon and captured Damaji. The fortress was subsequently destroyed. Later, Damaji entered into the service of Shahu.

He inherited the hereditary title of Rustumrao from his father, Khandoji. The title combines Rustam, symbolizing strength and heroism in Persian, with Rao, a Marathi honorific for leaders or nobles.

== Background ==
Damaji Thorat was the son of Khandoji Thorat, a general and saranjamdar under Rajaram I. Khandoji held the titles of Rustumrao and Bara Hazari, which denote a person in command of twelve thousand cavalry. Although little is known about Damaji's early life, it is presumed that he accompanied his father in his campaigns, where he began to develop his military and administrative skills.

=== Origins ===
Damaji had Dhangar origins. However, his actions provide insight into his character. During a confrontation with Balaji Vishwanath, Damaji reportedly took an oath of Bel-Bhandara, a sacred vow among the Dhangars. He later dismissed its significance by saying, 'For me, bel is a leaf and bhandara is turmeric; I eat this every day; what is the significance?' This casual dismissal of the sacred oath was surprising.

== Early military career ==
In the early stages of his military career, it is believed that Damaji, along with his father Khandoji, was present to assist Rajaram I during the siege of Jinji.

== Rustumrao ==
Damaji Thorat lived at Hingangao near Purandar. His family also had patilki of Hingangao village, where he had built a strong fortress. Thorat came to power during the reign of Rajaram. Ramchandra Pant granted him Patas kasba as Jahagir. After Rajaram's death, he showed great bravery against the Mughals. For his bravery he was given the title 'Rustumrao'. He had support from Ramchandra Pant. Rajaram I sent Thorat, Pawar and Atole to make their established collections the chauth and sardeshmukhi, as they were termed, from the Mughal territory, and under the encouragement of success his officers added a third contribution for themselves under the head of "ghasdana" or forage money. In this manner a new army was raised whose leaders were Thorat, Pawar and Athavale. Rajaram I gave them honorary presents and rewards; the title of Vishwasrao was conferred on Pawar, of Dinkarrao on Thorat and of Shamsher Bahadur on Atole.

== After Rajaram's Death ==
When Shahu arrived in the Swarajya territory he tried to win Thorat to his side but Thorat did not join Shahu. In 1708 Dhanaji Jadhav went to Khandesh. He brought Thorat and Dabhade with him to meet Shahu. In July 1709 meeting between Shahu, Sambhaji and Damaji Thorat and others proved unsuccessful. In July 1711 Chandrasen revolted against Shahu. Thorat also joined Tarabai. Tarabai welcomed with joy their move. When Angre was very aggressive against Shahu, Thorat brothers created considerable trouble for Shahu in the territory around Poona. After the deposition of Tarabai and her son, Damaji Thorat became the supporter of Sambhaji and sought Nizam’s protection, Damaji Thorat also went over to Nizam’s side and afterwards to Husain Ali. In 1716 Damaji was very active against Shahu. In one letter written by Balaji Vishwanath to Shahu it was stated, that Thorat brothers had created much trouble in the territory around Miraj. In fact when Balaji had concluded treaty with Angre he had assured that he would not take any step against Damaji. However, as they had created a lot of trouble for Shahu with the support of Sambhaji of Kolhapur conflict between the two sides became inevitable.

== Clash with Balaji Vishwanath Bhat ==
Balaji Vishwanath Bhat introduced gradually some strength into his councils, and started to take lead in public affairs. Balaji proposed to reduce Damaji Thorat in 1711, and then set out with an army for that purpose. Balaji was seized and thrown into the confinement with Dewaan Ambaji Purandhare, his two young sons Baji Rao I and Chimnaji Appa, and many of their immediate officers.

== Clash with Sachiv ==
Shahu who now applied to the Sachiv to suppress Thorat. The Sachiv and his manager advanced against Thorat, but they too were defeated and thrown into confinement. Damaji Thorat had seized the young Sachiv, and an expedition was again planned against him. Balaji managed first to effect the Sachiv's release and in return received the Sachiv's rights in the Poona district and the fort of Purandhar, and Damaji was soon defeated and taken prisoner.
