= Bhoite Saranjam =

Bhoite Saranjam was one of the political saranjams of British India under the Bombay Presidency. Its capital was Jalgaon City. It was a Maratha jagir of the Bhoite clan.

HH Maharaja Tryambakrao Bapurao Bhoite Inamdar, Saranjam Ruler of Jalgaon, Eastern Khandesh, image of 1939.

Bhoite Saranjams ruler was brother branches of Bhoite Sarnoubat and Senakartas of Satara and prominent among Maratha Politics.

This Saranjam was annexed on 1 November 1952.

== See also ==
- Maratha
- Maratha Empire
- List of Maratha dynasties and states
- List of Indian princely states
- Saranjamdar
