= Bhoite =

Maratha surname

Bhoite (Marathi: भोईटे) is a surname found amongst the Marathi Maratha caste, mainly in the state of Maharashtra in India but it also appears in Indian states bordering Maharashtra.

== Titles ==
The Bhoites alienated to the number of social honours given to them by the administrators whom they served, People on whom they had rule viz. Patil, Deshmukh, Shiledar (military rank), Bargir, Sarkar, Sardeshmukh, Sardar (military rank), Naik (military rank), Inamdar, Watandar, Sarnoubat (military rank), Senapati (military rank), Senakarta (military rank), Jagirdar, Zamindar, Saranjamdar, Raja.

== Distribution ==
=== Maharashtra ===
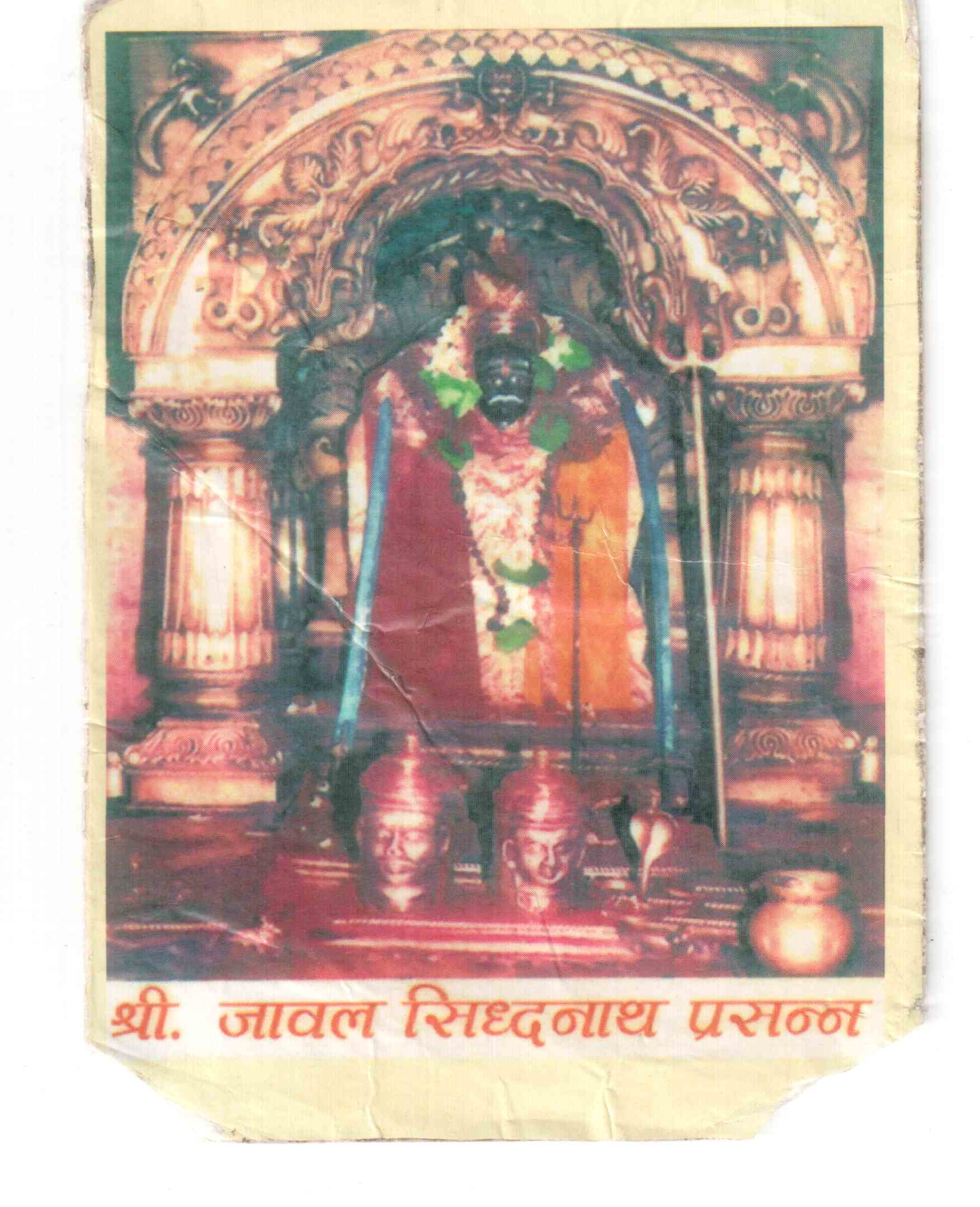
Shree Siddhanath

They supported Chhatrapati Shivaji Maharaj to find Hindavi Swarajya. The Modi script sources shows Bhoites from Satara villages helped Chhatrapati Shivaji in the Battle of Fort Subhanmangal at Shirwal on 8 August 1648. Bhoites played an active role in the Maratha fight against Aurangzeb, and in many other conflicts in Indian history. The Bhoites were faithfuls of Peshwa. They were the first leaders of Maratha Troop to march against Ahmadshah Abdali and routed to him in 1761, and revolt against the British in 1857. In service of princely states like Satara, Gwalior, Baroda, Nagpur, Kolhapur and in the 1942 parallel government of Satara under Krantisinha Nana Patil and also in Sansthani Praja Parishada Movements in British Phaltan State. The Bhoites were founder leaders of Patri Sarkar of Satara. They also ruled several estates in Maharashtra like Jalgaon Saranjam. Bhoites are among few of these Marathas who remained loyal and faithful to Maratha Empire from its foundation to the collapse. Bhoites are founders of both Education Societies Viz. Rayat Shikshan Sanstha(1919), Biggest education society of Maharashtra being Supporters of Karmaveer Bhausaheb Patil

=== Madhya Pradesh ===
In Madhya Pradesh, Bhoites are present near Gwalior, Indore, and the Guna region where Marathas dwell. The Shindes of Gwalior, Gaekwads of Baroda, Pawars of Dhar and Dewas, Holkars(Dhangar) of Indore are the Sardars of Peshwa Period like Sardar Ranoji Bhoite but after the defeat in Panipat the Bhoites died in larger extent and no other was able to establish power like above rulers. They established himself there along with Maratha rulers. Until Maratha Empire in 1818, they remained powerful royal knights with some other allies. One of the Bhoite stem in Tadawale are in Guna since Peshwa Period, who are the relatives of Shinde Maratha clan of Kanherkhed holding some properties.

=== Gujarat ===
In the state of Gujarat, the Bhoites being closest faithfuls of Chhatrapati Shahu were representatives of him in Baroda early in the 18th century.

== Overseas ==
The Bhoites are present historically in the Mauritius through marriage alliances with Jagtap, Nikam, Yadav, Sawant, More, chavan and others of Maratha Community. They trace their lineage back to the rebellions of 1857 war against British.

== Notables ==
- Ratoji Bhoite Patil, the hereditary Patil of Tadawale Sammat Wagholi, surrounding area comprising villages under Chhatrapati Shivajis Jurisdiction and before King Shivaji era(Under Deccan Sultanates).
- Ranoji Bhoite, an 18th-century Sarnoubat (commander in chief) of the Maratha army

HH Maharaja Trimbakrao Bapurao Bhoite Inamdar, Saranjam Ruler of Jalgaon, Eastern Khandesh

== Sources ==
=== Marathi language ===
- Balagi Nathugi Gavand and Govind Moroba Karlekar (1997). Kshytriya Marathyanchi Vanshavali and Shannavkuli aani Surya, Som, Bhramh and Sheshvant (9th ed.). Tukaram book Depot, Madhavbag, Mumbai 4; printed by Sumangal Artec, G-8 MIDC, Marol bus depot, Andheri, (East) Mumbai - 400093.
- Bhramibhoot Sadguru Param Pujya Moredada (11 July 2002). Shree Shatradharma, Prachalit and pramikh kshtravansh and tyanche gotra, pravar, kuldaivat, kuldevata a Devak. Shree Swami Samarth Seva And Adhyatmik vikas pradhan kendra District Nasik, Taluka Dindori, Maharashtra state.
- Gopal Dajiba Dalwi (1912). Maratha Kulancha Etihas (Parts 1-6). Induprakash Press, Mumbaie.

=== English language ===
- Nana Phadnis; Antaji Nankeshvar (1984). The Decade of Panipat, 1751-61. Popular Prakashan. pp. 26, 34, 36. ISBN 978-0-86132-112-4.
- Pī. E. Gavaḷī (1988). Society and social disabilities under the Peshwas. National Pub. House. p. 68. ISBN 978-81-214-0157-9. section covering Maratha knights.
- Shibani Roy; S. H. M. Rizvi (1 January 2002). Encyclopaedia of Indian surnames. B.R. Pub. Corp. ISBN 978-81-7646-247-1.
- Viṭhṭhala Gopāḷa Khobarekara (2002). Konkan, from the earliest to 1818 A.D.: a study in political and socio-economic aspects. Snehavardhan Pub. House. p. 157.
- Sumitra Kulkarni (1995). The Satara raj, 1818-1848: a study in history, administration, and culture. Mittal Publications. p. 78. ISBN 978-81-7099-581-4.
- Reginald E. Enthoven (1975). The tribes and castes of Bombay. Cosmo Publications. pp. 20, 23, 25 etc. The Brahmavansha stem of Bhoite.
- Govind Sakharam Sardesai (1933). Hand book to the records in the Alienation Office, Poona. Printed at the Govt. Central Press. p. 19.
- Ganda Singh (1959). Ahmad Shah Durrani, father of modern Afghanistan. Asia Pub. House. p. 129.
- Journal of the Pakistan Historical Society. Pakistan Historical Society. 1991. p. 133.
- S.R. Bakshi; S.K. Sharma (1 January 2000). Jaipur State rulers and their diplomacy. Deep & Deep Publications. p. 234. ISBN 978-81-7629-223-8.
- T. T. Mahajan (1 January 1992). Courts and administration of justice under Chhatrapati Shivaji. Commonwealth Publishers. ISBN 978-81-7169-198-2.
- A. B. Shinde (2 February 1990). The parallel government of Satara: a phase of the Quit India movement. Allied Publishers. ISBN 978-81-7023-138-7.
- Vishwas Patil (1992). Panipat. Bharatiya Sahitya Sardan.
- Arun Bhosale; Ashok S. Chousalkar; Lakshminarayana Tarodi; Shivaji University (2001). Freedom movement in princely states of Maharashtra. Shivaji University.
