= Aradgaon =

Village in Maharashtra

- village
- Location in Maharashtra, India Aradgaon (India)
- Coordinates: 17.93°N 74.39°E
- Country: India
- State: Maharashtra
- District: Satara

Population (2001)
  - Total: 6,000

Languages
  - Official: Marathi
- Time zone: UTC+5:30 (IST)
- PIN: 415521

Aradgaon is a village in Phaltan Tehsil, Satara district, Maharashtra.

== History ==
This Place was created by Kshatriya Clan of Maratha named as Bhoite, from their capital nearby Hingangaon. Some Branch of Bhoite and their relatives establish this place. In Battle of panipat one Bhoite maratha knight of aradgaon among royal bhoites showed bravery.

== Government System ==
The Gram Panchayat System is hailing here for the sake of Administration and staff like Sarapanch, Dy. Sarapancha, Talathi, Police Patil is contributing to Village Welfare.

== Occupation ==
The Occupation of the village is mainly Agriculture and people used to do it. But some people are in the Politics, Army, Government administration, Education Field etc. fields.

== Education ==
Education Facilities are not sufficient here. So people quench their educational thirst through nearer Hingangaon, Lonand, Phaltan etc. Centres. However, for the sake of higher studies students are found in Pune, Mumbai and several other decent places.

== People ==
People from the all castes live in Aradgaon generally. However, like several Maharashtrian villages, the dominant caste in the village is Maratha and among them Bhoite, Kshatriya Suryavanshi 96K Maratha Clan dominated here. Also the politics of Phaltan Tehsil are led by the local leader, named Shree Krishna Chandraji Bhoite, an elite Maratha from this village. He was Honourable Rural Politician in the Tehsil and was a popular politician, ex. MLA of Phaltan. Mr. Nandkumar Abaji Bhoite, was President of Phaltan Municipality.

== See ==
- Phaltan
- Maharashtra
- Bhoite
