= Ranoji Bhoite =

18th-century Maratha chieftain

Ranoji Bhoite (Shrimant Ranojirao Bhoite) was a Maratha chieftain of the Bhoite clan who lived in the 18th century. The Commander in Chief of the Maratha army from satara He was a contemporary of Ranoji Shinde, Dattaji Shinde, and others. Bhoite was an active Commander in Maratha's North India Campaign. Some Maratha leaders survived after the Panipat battle and created their own kingdoms, but Bhoite did not. He served under King Shahu in the Satara Kingdom.

== Battles ==
- Sardar Ranojirao Bhoite was faithful of Peshwa Bajirao I as he had taken active and important part in the Battles of Maratha Empire including Malwa (December 1723), Dhar-1724, Aurangabad-1724, Battle of Palkhed (February 1728), Ahmedabad-1731, Udaipur-1736, Firozabad-1737, Delhi-1737, Bhopal-1738, Battle of Vasai (May 17, 1739).
- Sardar Ranoji Bhoite and Sardar Kaloji Bhosale were on Mulukhgiri in Varhad(Middle Maharashtra) with their troops and resisted Nizams.
- Sardar Ranojirao Bhoite was leader of 5000 Maratha Army in the year of 1728
- Sardar Ranojirao Bhoite defeated Traitor Maratha Sardar Udaji Chavan with the help of Sardar Pilajirao Jadhav and Ambaji Pant in the Battle of Pusesavali.
- In the Decade of 1750, Ranojirao Bhoite along with Sabaji Shinde-Patil led 6000 Marathas to Combat against Ramsing and Bakhtasing ( Rajput Leaders ) in the battle of Ajmer.
- On 16 October 1755, Bhoite led 6000 Maratha troops to victory against the 25,000 strong Rajput forces.
- The Battle of Fort Dhekala, where the Maratha Cavalry captured the fort from the regional Rajput leader honoured as Raja of Shivpur(vessal of Rana of Udaipur), after overcoming the ruler the marathas received Rs. 20 Lakhs and ownership of fort with Ranojis descendants as Raja.
- He was renowned and popular among Marathas with name Bhoite Sarnoubat.

== Descendants ==
Bhoite's descendants live in the regions captured by Bhoite's campaigns. Many served in the military as well.

== Sources ==
- Jadunath Sarkar: A History of Jaipur 1503-1938, Page 247, By Raghubir Sinh, Contributor Raghubir Sinh, Edition: reprint. Published by Orient Blackswan, 1994. ISBN 81-250-0333-9, ISBN 978-81-250-0333-5 (416 pages)
- The Decade of Panipat, 1751-61, Page 26,34, & 36, By Ian Raeside, Nana Phadnis, Antaji Nankeshvar. Published by Popular Prakashan, 1984 Original from the University of Michigan Digitized 8 Aug 2007 ISBN 0-86132-112-X, 9780861321124 (175 pages)
