= Anjam =

Anjam may refer to:

- Anjam language, a Madang language of Papua New Guinea
- Kenar Anjam, a village in Mazandaran, Iran
- Anjem Choudary (born 1967), a British-Pakistani Islamist

== See also ==
- Anjaam (1940 film), a 1940 Indian Hindi-language film
- Anjaam, a 1994 Indian Hindi-language film
