= Nikam =

Clan of Maratha, Kunbi and Bhil of Maharashtra, India

Nikam (or Nikumbha) is a Suryavanshi Maratha clan that traces its lineage to the Suryavanshi (Solar dynasty) of Ayodhya, specifically to King Nikumbh, Mandhatri. As members of the Suryavanshi dynasty, the clan is listed among the 96 Marathas clans and are associated with the ancient solar lineage.

== Notables ==
- Ujjwal Nikam, public prosecutor
- Vishal Nikam, Bigg Boss Marathi season 3 winner

== See also ==
- Khandesh
