= Saranjamdar =

A Saranjam is a grant of land (initially non-hereditary, sometimes hereditary) for maintenance of troops or for military service found among the Maratha, Rajput, Kunbi, Vanjari, Dhangar, Koli and few Brahmin communities in Maharashtra and the formerly administered regions under the Maratha Empire of India, including territories in present-day Karnataka and Madhya Pradesh. The grant was bestowed by a king or regional ruler of a princely state.

The Saranjam system may be a form of to the Jagir (feudatory estate) system. The land was mostly in the form of a rural Watan (rights given in reward for previous service or merit) or Jagir, its owner being entitled to extract revenue from the villages included in the territory.

Saranjamdar was the title given to the landlord or holder of a Saranjam. It was usually bestowed on that person for heroic deeds in the military field, thus most Saranjamdars were former military officers. He may be a jagirdar, always ranking as a vassal.

== Political Saranjam ==
Rajaram Bhonsle (1670 – 1700) adopted the Saranjam system as a political measure to ensure the loyalty of key persons to the side of the Maratha Empire. Later under the Peshwa, it would become hereditary, being liable to be partitioned as well.

In British India there were also certain estates which were rendered as Political Saranjams, having equal status with the princely states.

== Related titles ==
- Shinde
- Deshmukh
- Inamdar
- Naik
- Mansabdar
- Patil
- Zamindar

== See also ==
- List of Maratha dynasties and states
