= Hingangaon =

- Town
- Location in Maharashtra, India
- Coordinates: 17.94°N 74.42°E
- Country: India
- State: Maharashtra
- District: Satara

Population (2001)
  - Total: 8,000

Languages
  - Official: Marathi
- Time zone: UTC+5:30 (IST)
- PIN: 415521

Hingangaon is a town and Gram panchayat in Phaltan, a tehsil of Satara in the Indian state of Maharashtra.

== Government ==
The Gram Panchayat governing system is adopted there. The administrator is a democratically elected sarpanch. Grampanchayat has been established here since 2 February 1953.
