= Tadawale Sammat Wagholi =

Village in Maharashtra

- Town
- Location in Maharashtra, India Tadawale Sammat Wagholi (India)
- Coordinates: 17.95°N 74.090°E
- Country: India
- State: Maharashtra
- District: Satara

Area
  - Total: 50 km^{2} (19 sq mi)

Population (2001)
  - Total: 8,000
  - Density: 160/km^{2} (410/sq mi)

Languages
  - Official: Marathi
- Time zone: UTC+5:30 (IST)
- PIN: 415524
- Telephone code: 02371

Tadawale Sammat Wagholi is a small town and gram panchayat in Koregaon taluka, Satara district, in the Indian province of Maharashtra.

Tadawale Sammat Wagholi is a hill station near Wathar Station, Koregaon on the Lonand-Satara Highway Road.

== Government ==
Tadawale Sammat Wagholi is governed by a gram panchayat, whose head is elected by the villagers and is recognised as Sarpanch.
