= Inamdar (title) =

Indian honorific title

Inamdar was a feudal title prevalent before and during the British Raj, including during the Maratha rule of Peshwa, the Deccan Sultanate, the Bahamani Kingdom and other rulers of India. The title was bestowed upon the person who received lands as Inam (grant or gift), rewarding the extraordinary contribution rendered to the ruler or the princely state.

Inam Land is defined as Land held as a gift or a grant by a Nizam or any Jagirdar.

In the colonial age, the British enacted several laws which defined rights and obligations of Inamdar in their territories, like the Madras Inams Act VIII of 1869. There was a separate post of Inam Commissioner to look after revenue and records of Inam lands. There were certain Inam lands which were known as Pargana Watan Inam Lands.

== Abolition and heritage ==
After the independence of India, several acts were enacted in different regions to abolish rights of Inamdar and as such the Inam lands they received in grant, notably: The Bombay Personal Inams Abolition Act (XLII of 1953), The Bombay Pargana and Kukarni Watans (Abolition) Act, 1950; The Karnataka (Religious & Charitable Institutions) Inams Abolition Act, 1955; The Karnataka (Personal and Miscellaneous) Inams Abolition Act, 1977; The Karnataka Certain Inams Abolition Act, 1977; The Hyderabad Abolition of Inams Act, 1955; The Madras Inam Estates (Abolition and Conversion into Ryotwari) Act, 1963, etc.

When the Inamdari system of holdings and Inam lands was abolished, so was the feudal title of Inamdar.
