= Mundra =

- town
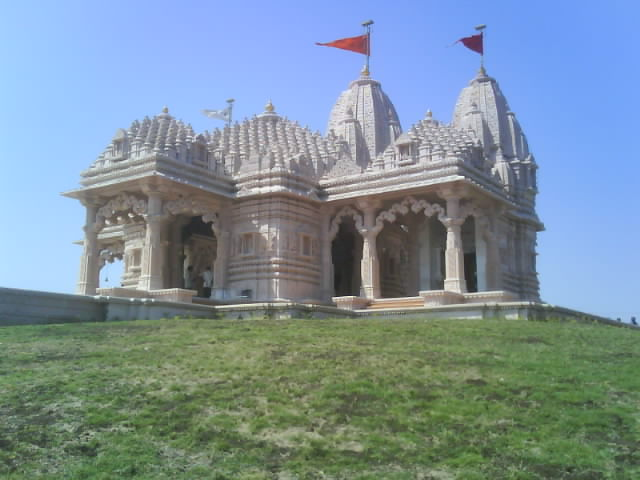
- Shiv Mandir at Shantivan, Mundra

- Location in Gujarat, India Mundra (India)
- Coordinates: 22.85°N 69.73°E
- Country: India
- State: Gujarat
- District: Kutch
- Established: 1640s

Government
  - Type: Municipality
  - Body: Mundra-Baroi Nagar Palika
- Elevation: 14 m (46 ft)

Population
  - Total: 36,281

Languages
  - Official: Gujarati
  - Others: Kutchi
- Time zone: UTC+5:30 (IST)
- PIN: 370421
- Vehicle registration: GJ-12

Mundra is a census town and a headquarter of Mundra Taluka of Kachchh district in the Indian state of Gujarat. Founded in about the 1640s, the town was an important mercantile centre and port throughout its history. Mundra Port is the largest private port in India.

== History ==
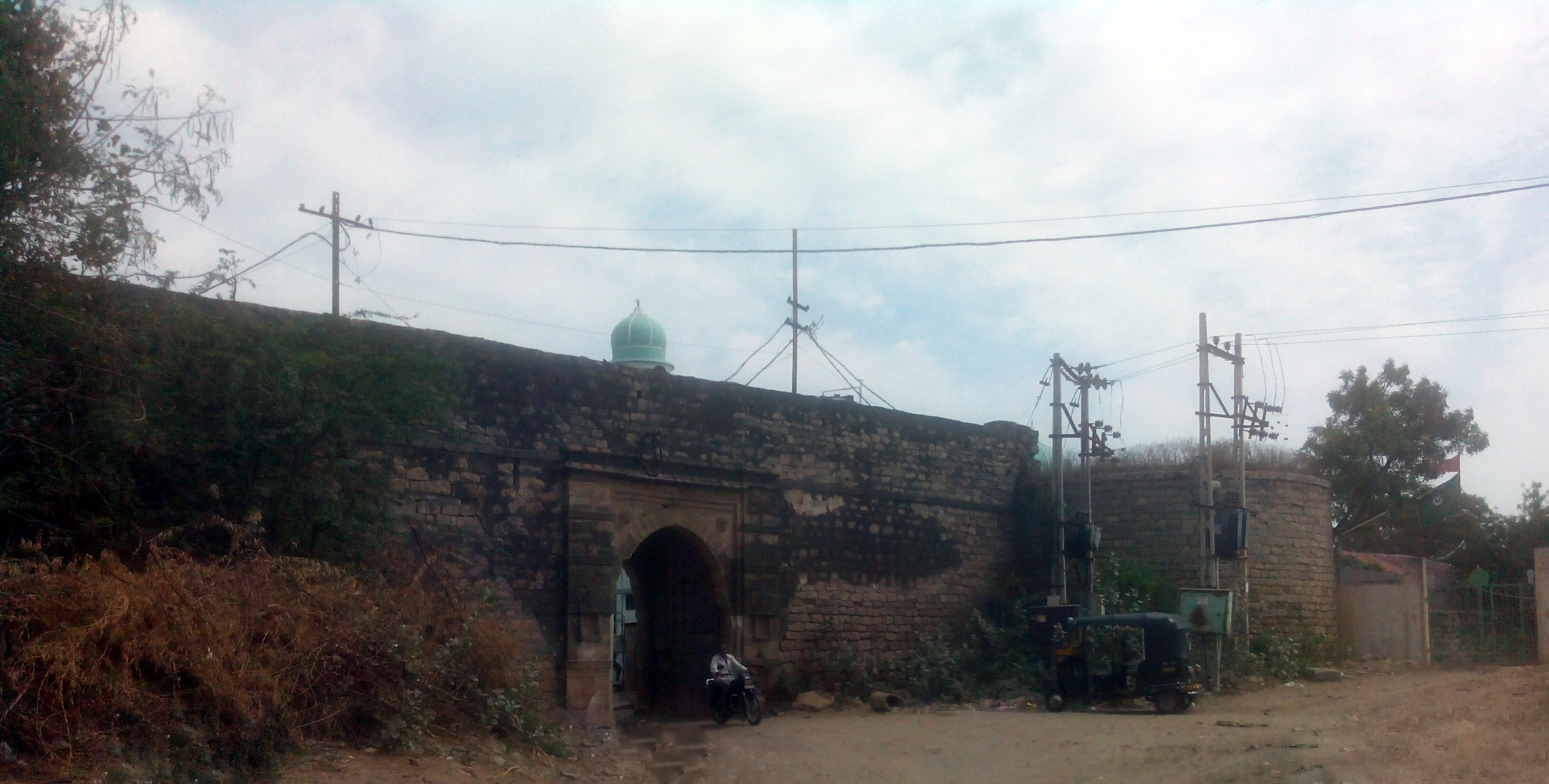
Mundra Fort

Mundra was established by Bhojarajji I of Cutch State in the 1640s.

According to a legend, a Jain merchant named Vardhaman Sheth asked Pir Hazrat Shah Murad Bukhari to pray for the safety of his sinking cargo ship. Miraculously, the ship was saved when the pir used his dhoti to prevent seawater from entering the ship. Vardhaman Sheth requested the pir to rename the town from Dumra to Muradabad in his respect, but the pir declined and suggested the name Munahara, lit. 'a picturesque town near a river'. The name Mundra is derived from Munahara. Many other miracles are attributed to the pir. The legend also highlights a local custom among seafarers and merchants of visiting the pir's shrine before going to sea.

The town was fortified in 1728 by Devakaran Seth, Dewan of Deshalji I. The Old Mundra town was walled and fortified with the masonry from the ruins of the ancient town of Bhadreshwar, twenty-seven kilometres to the north-east. It is mentioned in the Bantvijaya Chronicles and the masonry was transported as late as Vikram Samvat 1817 (1760). It is also mentioned by James Burgess. Colonel Holland who visited it in the 1840s mentions that the walled town was 1.5 miles in circumference and had 1500 houses.

In 1755, Mundra was held and defended by Godji II when he was in revolt against his father Rao Lakhpatji. He imposed charges on merchants entering and exiting the town to raise funds on the advice of Punja, his adviser. Lakhaptji was angered by the act and sent an army to the town. Godji fled to Morbi, strengthened his army and recaptured the town from his father. They compromised and Godji was allowed to keep Mundra and Punja was forced to retire.

During Rao Rayadhan III's reign in 1778, he was forced to retire and the administration of the state was taken over by Bar Bhayat ni Jamat (the council of twelve), a group of chiefs. A soldier called Fateh Muhammad rose to dominance in 1792. In 1801, Mundra was given by Fateh Muhammad to another chief called Dosal Ven. He later regained the town from him. Later it was given to Hansraj who also rose against him so he transferred it to his associate Muhammad Sota. In 1815, when held by Muhammad Sota, it was unsuccessfully attacked by Rao Bharmalji II. In 1818, it is said to have a population of 1200 souls and to have yielded a revenue of £3000 (Rs 30,000). In 1855, the fort was in good repair and contained 1500 houses. In 1861, it was noted for petty carpets of stamped cotton. In 1879, there was a considerable trade with Kathiawar, Khambhat, Surat and Bombay. The chief exports were cotton, castor seed, pulse, wool and dyed cloth and the chief imports were metals, timber, grain, dates, grocery, and piece goods. In 1872, it had a population of 7952. The town was the base of many mercantile communities including Kutchi Oswal Vanias and Bhatias in the 18th to early 20th century. The importance of the town declined with the rise of Bombay (now Mumbai) and the construction of the Rajputana railway in the 1870s.

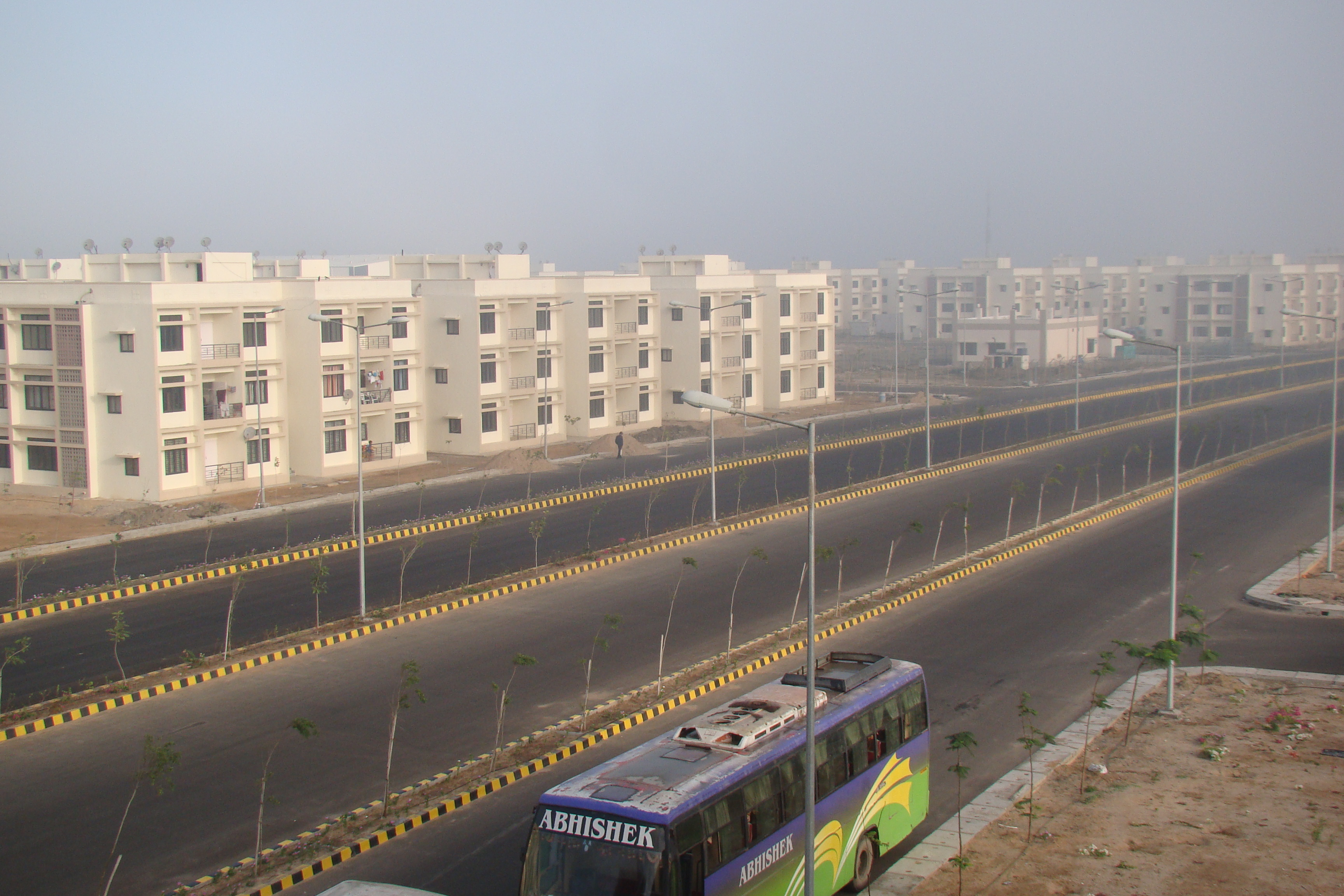
Samundra Township

After the independence of India in 1947, Cutch State acceded unto the dominion of India and constituted an independent commissionaire, Kutch State. In 1956, Kutch State was merged with Bombay state, which in 1960 was divided into the new linguistic states of Gujarat and Maharashtra, with Kutch becoming part of Gujarat State. Mundra now falls under Kutch district of Gujarat.

In 1994, the Mundra Port was announced at Mundra. The operation started in October 1998. In subsequent years, the port expanded rapidly resulting in rapid expansion of the town and population. During the January 2001 Gujarat earthquake, Mundra was the only place in the district of Kutch which was not affected by the devastation. Following the earthquake, tax incentives were granted for setting up new industries in this district which led to the rapid industrialisation of this region. In 2014, Mundra Port surpassed Kandla in cargo handling and became the largest private port in India. On 29 August 2020, Mundra and Baroi Gram Panchayats were merged to form the Mundra-Baroi Municipality.

== Civic administration ==
Mundra-Baroi Municipality was incorporated in 2020. They were administered by gram panchayats before. There are 7 wards and 28 seats in Mundra-Baroi Municipality. Of them, 18 seats are for reserved categories and 10 seats for unreserved categories.

== Places of interest ==
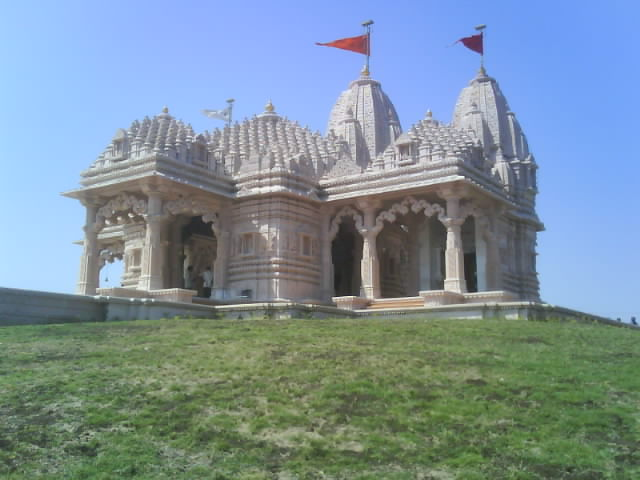
Shantinath Mahadev Temple at Shantivan Colony, Mundra

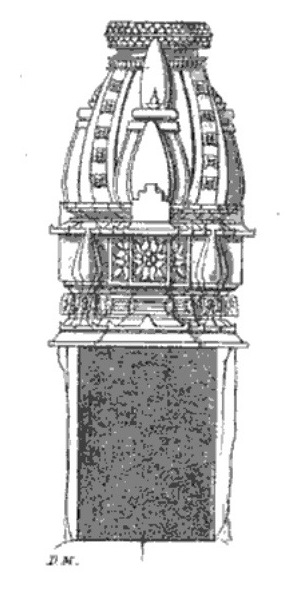
Shikhara of a Jain canopy, destroyed in 2001 earthquake

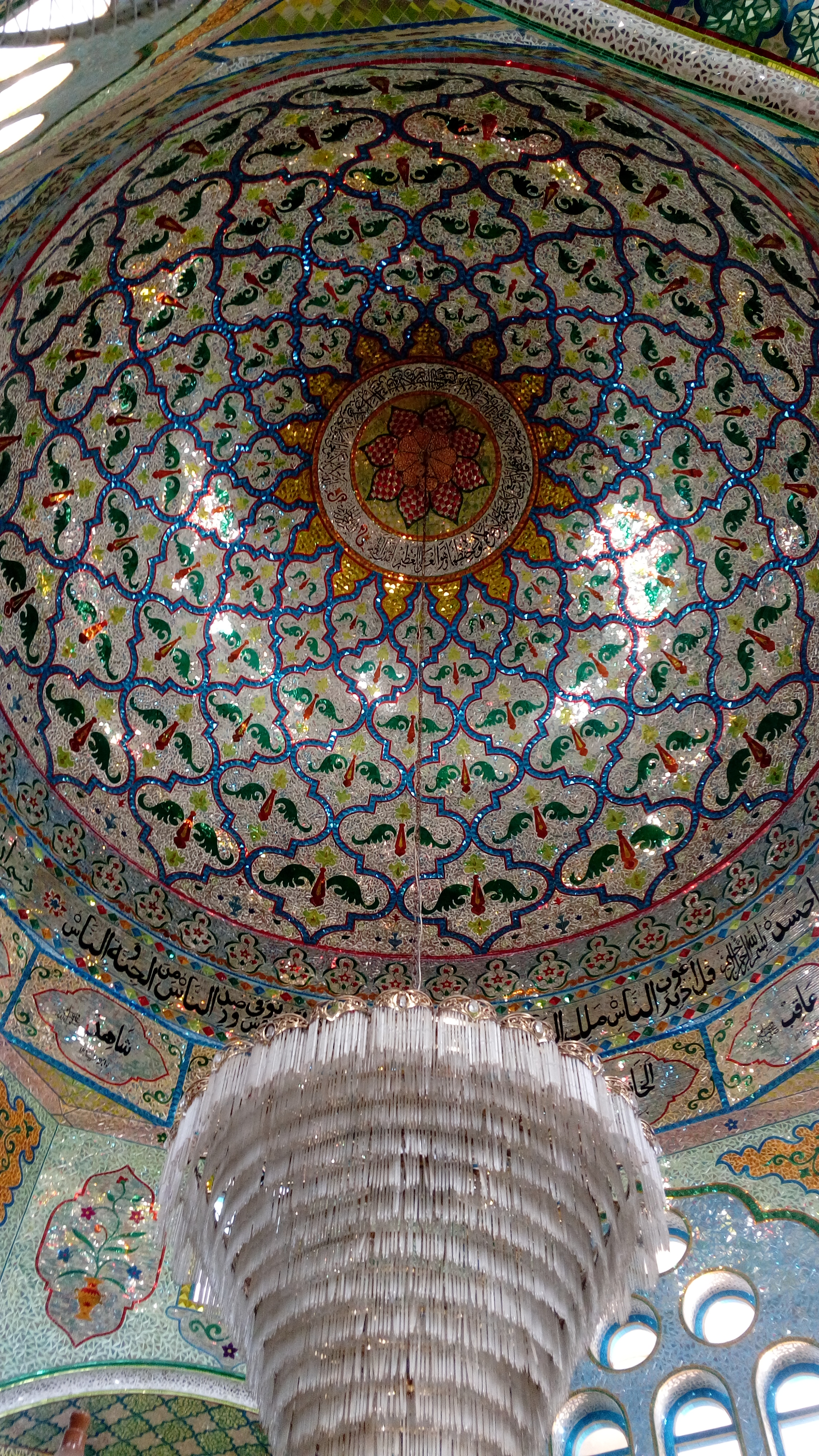
Glass studded roof of Bukhari Pir Dargah

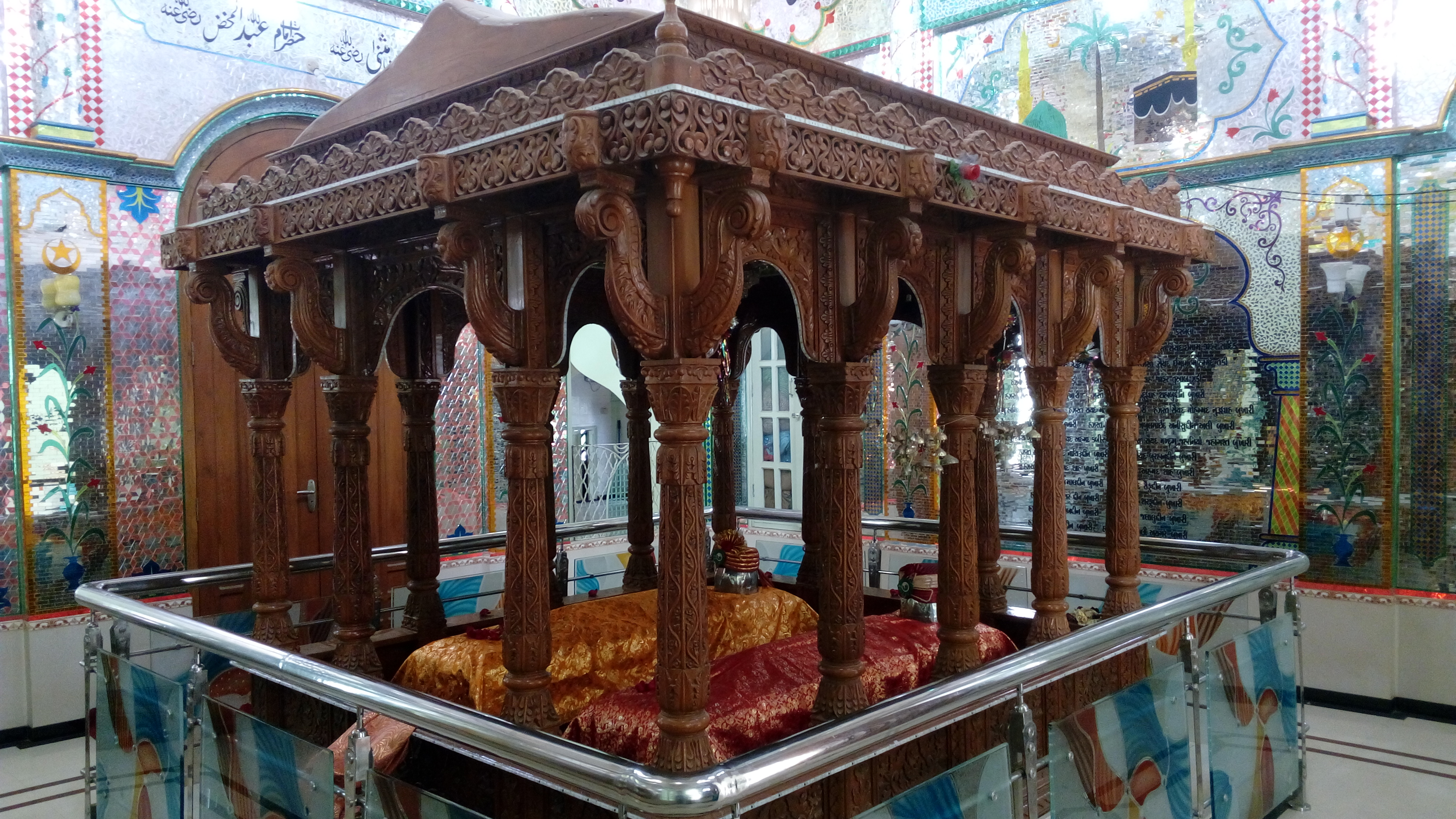
Bukhari Pir Dargah

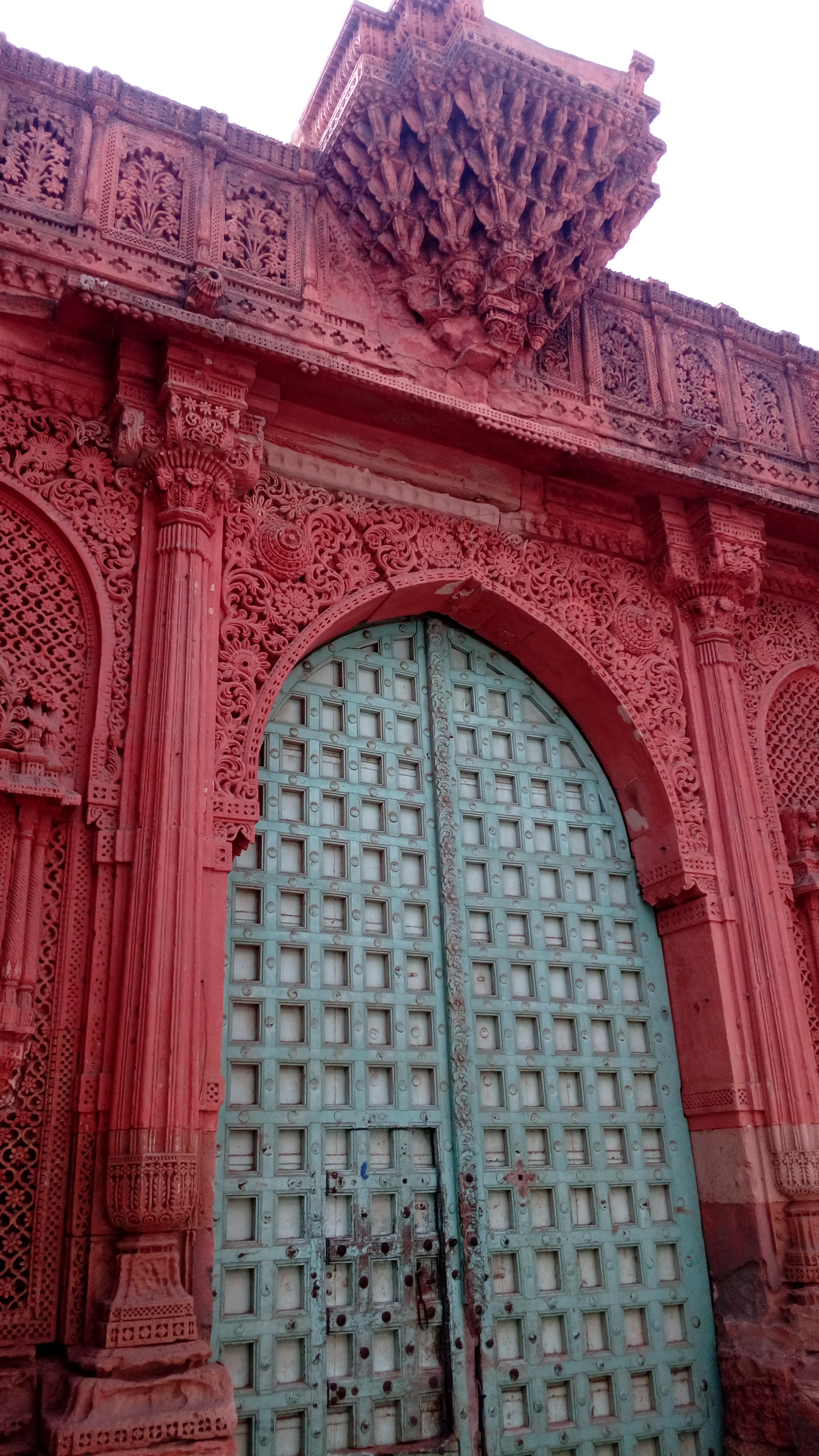
Stone carving on the gate of Bukhari Pir Dargah
- The Mahadev temple has memorials to some sailors of town, including some who advised the Sultan of Zanzibar and guided Vasco da Gama to India.
- Dariyalal, the patron saint of Kutchi fisher-people has a dedicated temple.
- Bukhari Pir Dargah: Shah Murad Bukhari arrived and ruled Khanate of Bukhara (now in Uzbekistan) but he was spiritually inclined. He came to India during the reign of Mughal Emperor Aurangzeb (1662) and lived at Nizamuddin Dargah in Delhi for some time and later reached Kutch where he was welcome by Rao Tamachi and locals. He lived in Mundra from 1662 to 1670. When he died, a Dariya Pir Dargah (shrine) dedicated to him was built. Aurangzeb built a gate in his honour, which still stands and is known today as the Mughal Gate. The seafarers and merchants used to visit it for blessings before venturing into the sea. The shrine receives a large number of devotees returning from the pilgrimage to Hajipir in March–April.
- Fortification: The walls of the old city fortifications have a religious origin, as they were dragged from the ruins of the ancient city of Bhadravati (now Bhadresar).
- Navlakho Bungalow: a very large and handsome two-storied bungalow built by Laximdas Laddha, son of Laddha Damji who was a manager of the firm of Jairam Shivji, a merchant banker who dominated commerce in East Africa in 18th and 19th century.
- Swali Sheri: The family of Jairam Shivji came to be known as Swahili due to their business in East Africa where Swahili language is spoken. His family adopted the surname Swali and the street near his house became known as Swali Sheri.
- A canopy (chhatra) raised over the footprints (paduka) of a Jain high priest of the Anchal Gaccha, 13 1/2 feet square inside, with a small spire over the marble slab on which the footprints arc engraved. The inside of the dome is neatly carved with a row of standing musicians. The outside of the dome is modern, but the screen wall, pillars, and interior are all old in thirteenth- or fourteenth-century style. As the inscription around the footprints is dated 1744, this shrine was probably the hall, mandap of an old temple. The front of the spire, shikhar over the marble slab bears the footprints of the Guru Harshaji, the disciple of Radhaji, the disciple of the Guru Jivaji, who died in Margashirsha Vad 10th of Samvat 1797 (1740) which is inscribed. Near this is a memorial stone, paliya, apparently, from the figure of a ship carved on it, raised to some seafarer. The canopy was destroyed in the 2001 earthquake.
- Shantinath Mahadev Temple is a Hindu temple dedicated to Shiva. It is located near Shantivan Colony, a township for employees of Adani Port, near Nana Kapaya village. The temple is surrounded by a garden.
- There are four Jain temples in town; Sheetalnath temple of Anchal Gaccha, Parshwanath temple of Tapa Gaccha, Mahavira temple of Kharatara Gaccha and Amizara Parshwanath temple of Gorji Trust.
- At Baroi, about a mile from Mundra, enclosed in a small court, is a temple of Nilkanth Mahadev, or the blue-necked Shiva, with, at the right side of the shrine door, an inscription dated 1667 (Samvat 1724). The linga is overshadowed by a large seven-headed brass snake. It is said to have been brought from the Shiva temple of Duda at Bhadresar.

== Amenities and culture ==
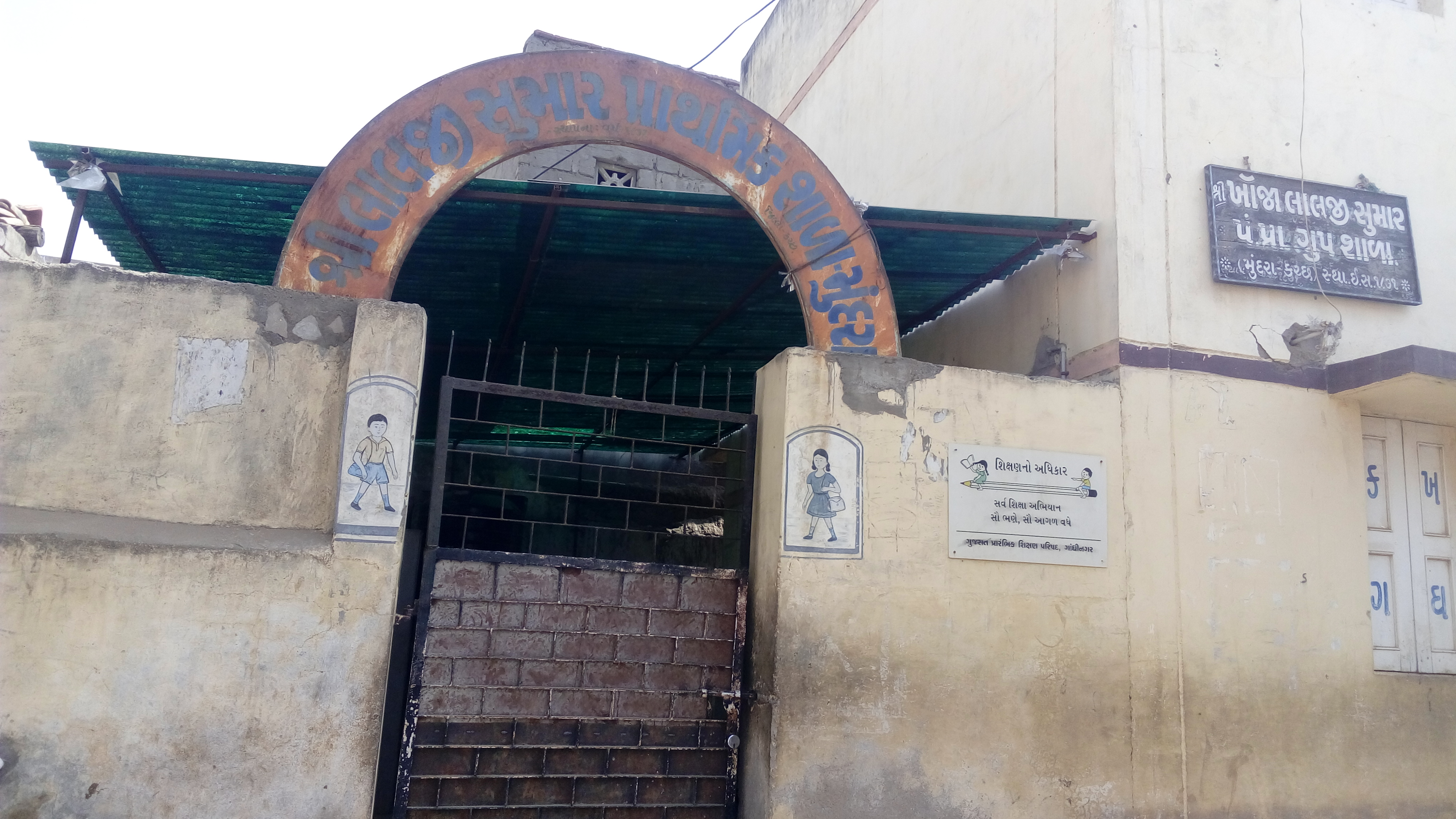
Khoja Lalji Sumar Primary School

Gaddhasar or Shastri Ground is the major playground in town. Transportation and medical facilities are available. Maharaoshri Khengarji Library in the old town is a public library run by the local administration.

In 2001 Adani Port started Adani Public School formerly known as Adani D.A.V Public School . Adani public School was the first CBSE school in Mundra.

In 1905, Aga Khan III started the Aga Khan School in Mundra, the first school that later became a large network of schools, Aga Khan Education Service. Other major schools are Government Primary School (Darbari), R. D. Highschool, St. Xavier's School, Calorx Public School (Samudra Township), and Adani Public School. Khoja Lalji Sumar Primary School was founded in 1871.

There are commerce, arts and PTC colleges in the town.

Dabeli and Kadak are popular snacks in town.

Nani Ravadi and Moti Ravadi are local dance and procession festivals celebrated in the Shravan month of the Hindu calendar by seafaring communities of Kharva. Nava Naroj is celebrated as the starting day of the new seafaring season. All other major Hindu and Muslim religious festivals are celebrated in the town including Diwali, Holi, Uttarayan, Muharram and Eids.

== Economy ==
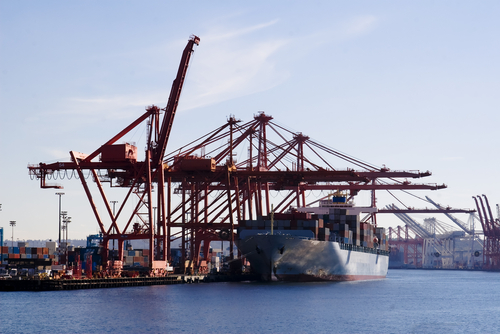
Mundra Port

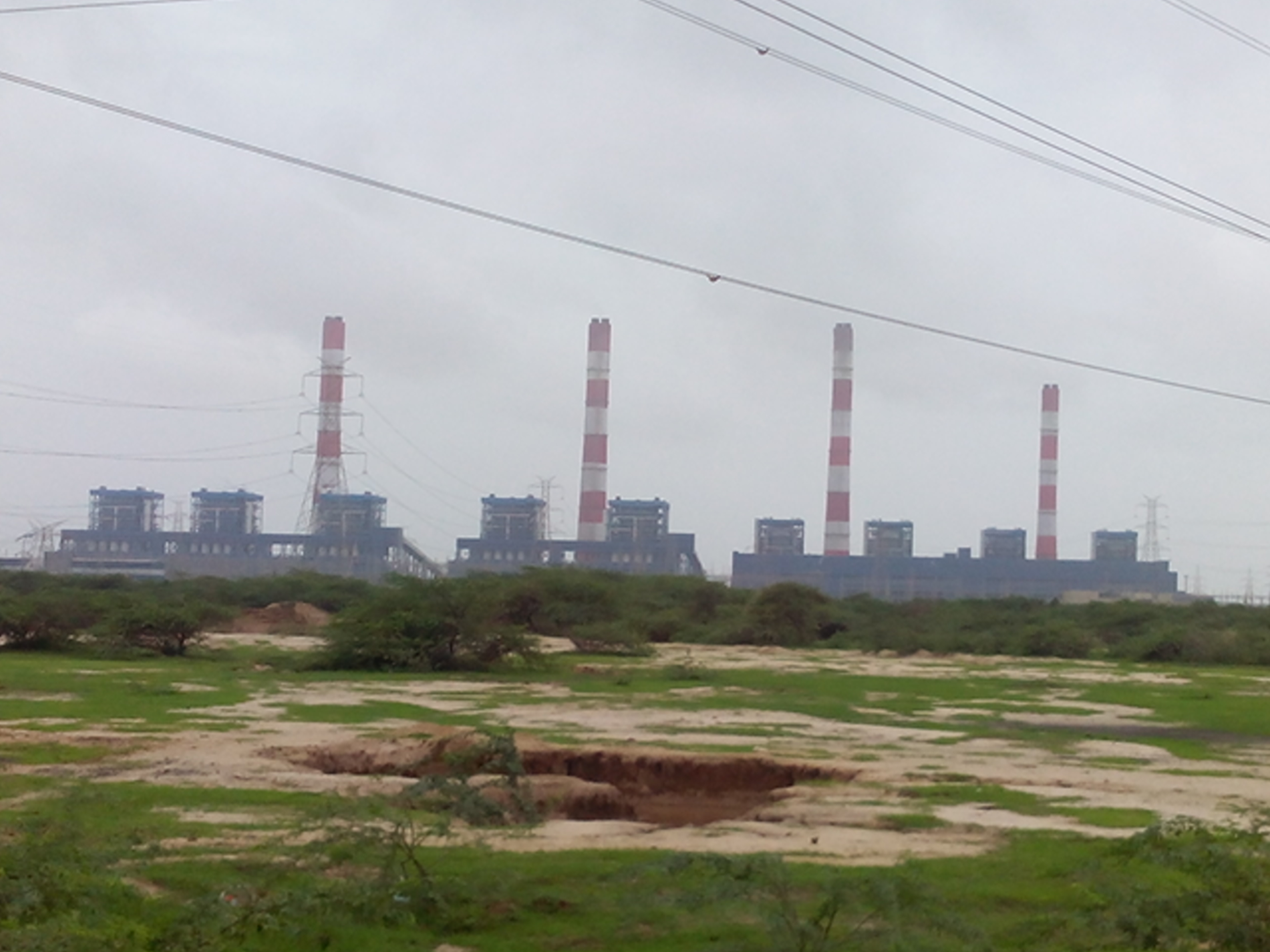
Mundra thermal power station

Mundra was well known for salt and spice trading in the past and now for tie-dye and block-printed textiles. The old harbour is virtually unusable today, and only small local fishing crafts navigate its silted waterways up the river.

The main source of income for the local people is agriculture, horticulture and wage labour. Mundra has a Date Palm Research Station operated by Sardarkrushinagar Dantiwada Agricultural University converted from a seed farm in 1969. Several people are employed in manufacturing companies, ports and power stations.

Mundra Port is the largest private port with multiproduct special economic zone owned and operated by Adani Ports & SEZ Limited.

There are two thermal power stations adjacent to Mundra, Mundra Ultra Mega Power Plant operated by Tata Power and Mundra Thermal Power Station operated by Adani Power. This power station generates over 8,600 MW of electricity. The coal for the power plant is imported primarily from Indonesia. Source of water for the power plant is seawater from the Gulf of Kutch.

== Transport ==
Mundra Airport is a private airport operated by Adani Group for scheduled as well as non-scheduled operations.
