= Kanoj =

Coordinates: 23.678034°N 68.572905°E

Kanoj, formerly known as Ra Kanoj, was a town destroyed whose ruins are stretched for a mile. They are located in Lakhpat Taluka of Kutch district of Gujarat, India.

== History ==
On the north bank of the Kinnar river, the town stretches in ruined heaps for about a mile. Among the ruins are indistinct traces of an old fort and of the line of the city walls. The town would seem to have been destroyed by Muslim invaders, but of its date nothing is known. About five miles south-west of Ra Kanoj is the tomb of Kasim, who according to the local story, took and destroyed the city. Kasim is said to have sent as a prize to his sovereign the king of Ghazni, two of the chief's daughters. At Ghazni they were treated with every kindness, but refused to be comforted, saying, that while they were under his charge, Kasim had violated them. Enraged at the story the king, without inquiry, ordered Kasim to be put to death and his head sent to Ghazni. When it was shown them his accusers rejoiced that they had avenged their father's death, and confessed that Kasim had done them no harm. On account of his undeserved punishment Kasim became a saint.

The place was not of any note till, in the beginning of the 19th century, minister of Cutch State Fateh Muhammad started the practice of visiting it every year with much state. So greatly in their opinion do they gain from being buried near this tomb, that the Jats bring their dead from great distances, and the country for two miles round is one great graveyard. Kasim's tomb, thirty-five feet long and five broad, is made of stones piled up without cement. It is on the site of a Shiva temple, and the linga once broken has been cemented, and is now worshiped both by Hindus and Muslims as Kasameshvar. The temple pool, kund, also remains. The Muslims call the pool Kara and the saint Kara Kasim.
