= Shivajinagar =

Shivajinagar may refer to various places in India:

== Places ==
- Shivajinagar, Bengaluru, Karnataka
- Shivajinagar, Chandrapur, Maharashtra
- Shivajinagar, Mumbai, Maharashtra
- Shivajinagar, Pune, Maharashtra
- Shivajinagar, Ratnagiri, Maharashtra
- Shivajinagar, Ulwe, Maharastra
- Shivaji Nagar, Surat, Gujarat
- Shivaji Nagar, Saverkundla, Gujarat

== Constituencies ==
- Shivajinagar Assembly constituency (disambiguation), electoral constituencies in India
  - Shivajinagar (Mumbai Vidhan Sabha constituency), or Shivajinagar Mankhurd, an assembly constituency of Mumbai Suburban, Maharashtra
  - Shivajinagar, Karnataka Assembly constituency, an assembly constituency of Shivajinagar, Bangalore, Karnataka
  - Shivajinagar, Maharashtra Assembly constituency, an assembly constituency of Shivajinagar, Pune, Maharashtra

== Other uses ==
- Shivajinagara (film), a 2014 Indian Kannada-language film

== See also ==
- Shivaji (disambiguation)
- Shivaji Nagar metro station (disambiguation)
