= Shivji =

Shivji may refer to:

- Shiva, a Hindu deity
- Amil Shivji, Indian-Tanzanian filmmaker, son of Issa
- Haji Mohammed Allarakha Shivji (1878–1921), Indian writer and journalist
- Issa G. Shivji (born 1946), Indian-Tanzanian author and academic
- Jairam Shivji (1792–1866), Indian merchant and banker from Kutch, India
- Kamlesh Shivji Vikamsey, former President of the Institute of Chartered Accountants of India
- Shiraz Shivji (born 1947), Tanzanian computer scientist

== See also ==
- Shivaji (disambiguation)
