= Prithvirajji =

Ruler of Kutch from 1786–1801

Titular Rao of Cutch
- Reign: 1786 – 1801
- Predecessor: Rayadhan III
- Successor: Bar Bhayat ni Jamat
- Regent of Bar Bhayat ni Jamat: Fateh Muhammad
- Born: c. 1774
- Died: 1801
- Dynasty: Jadeja Rajput
- Father: Godji II

Rao Prithviraj ji, also known as Bhaiji Bava, was the Rao of Cutch belonging to Jadeja Rajput dynasty, who ascended the throne of Princely State of Cutch as a titular head in 1786 and ruled until 1801 when he died at the early age of twenty seven. He ruled as titular head under council of Bar Bhayat ni Jamat.

== Life ==
Some regional heads revolted against Rayadhan III and deposed him in 1786. The chief actors, the Jamadars and Meghji Seth, raised Prithviraj, Rayadhan's younger brother to the chiefship who appointed during his minority a council known as the Bar Bhayat ni Jamat with Meghji Seth and Dosal Ven as its leading members. The Jamat restored the peace under the administration of Fateh Muhammad and the prosperity of the state grew.

When Prithviraj ji reached at mature age, began to view with jealousy his minister Fateh Muhammad's almost absolute power. The first open rupture was in 1801 at a pleasure party, on the Bhuj lake. Bhaiji had been drinking, and on some trifling difference of opinion, he not only accused Fateh Muhammad of rebellious intentions, but would have attacked him had he not been held back.

Afterwards there was a show of reconciliation, but Prithviraj ji had lost trust in Fateh Muhammad, and only waited a favourable opportunity of separating from him. Matters came to a crisis, when, shortly after, the young Rao asked for and was refused the revenues of the town of Mandvi. With his friends he now planned an escape from Bhuj, and on a day when Fateh Muhammad was absent at Lakhpat, the officer in charge of Bhachau sent troops to escort the Rao to Mandvi, where Seth Hansraj, the commandant of the town, received him, declared in his favour, and drove out the militia that continued true to Fateh Muhammad's interests. On reaching Lakhpat, Fateh Muhammad heard of the Rao's flight and turning back with all speed collected his forces at Bhuj. Under Askarna Seth he sent a detachment to the Machhu Kantha to prevent the arrival of troops from the Morbi chief.

This body of men did good service, attacking and defeating a formidable force coming to the Rao's assistance from Radhanpur, and then at Patri, on the way to Mandvi, defeating a detachment sent against them by Seth Hansraj. While thus successful, they were suddenly recalled to Bhuj, where Fateh Muhammad, deserted by one of his chief supporters the commandant of Lakhpat, and badly off for funds, had determined to centre his forces. The Rao now moved against Bhuj, and being joined by many bands of mercenaries, became so strong that Fateh Muhammad feeling resistance useless, agreed to surrender the capital, if he were given the estate of Bhachau.

Accepting these terms Prithviraj ji and Seth Hansraj took possession of Bhuj. Before leaving Bhuj, Fateh Muhammad set free Rayadhan III, a step which greatly embarrassed the new government. Rayadhan was at first most grateful to them for his freedom, and at last, with much trouble was pacified by a daily grant of about £8 (300 koris). After this the place of minister became a matter of keen dispute, and Muhammad Miyan, passed over in favour of Hansraj, was so displeased that he retired to Mundra. Scarcely were these troubles settled, when Prithviraj ji died at the early age of twenty-seven. Rayadhan took over the administration again but was deposed by Fateh Muhammad and made titular head under Bar Bhayat ni Jamat.

== Political Office ==
Prithvirajji Jadeja Dynasty Born: 1774 Died: 1801
Regnal titles
Preceded by Rayadhan III	Titular Maharaja of Kutch under Jamat; 1786 - 1801	Succeeded by Bar Bhayat ni Jamat
