= Bar Bhayat ni Jamat =

Bar Bhayat ni Jamat (Council of Twelve Brothers) was a council of twelve members which managed Cutch State under titular kings Prithvirajji from 1786 to 1801 and under Rayadhan III from 1801 to 1813. The council was chiefly led by Fateh Muhammad during both period. The council is also known as Bar Bhayyat or Bar Bhaya.

== History ==
Maharao Rayadhan III, who had become unpopular and had turned religious fanatic, who tried to convert his pupils to Islam which fuelled the revolt. He was deposed by the revolt of Jamadars, the local chiefs, led by Meghji Sheth, the administrator of Anjar. He seized the palace gates, and the Rao, forced to submit, was placed under restraint in 1786.

The chief actors, the Jamadars and Meghji Seth, raised Prithvirajji, Rayadhan's younger brother to the chiefship, appointed during his minority a council known as the Bar Bhayat ni Jamat which was a congregation of power. This twelve member council consisted of three members of the brothers from Jadeja ruler's family, three Mahajans (rich and influential moneylender or businessman from Hindu and Jain communities), three members from Muslim community, one member from Miyana community, one member of Gara Sadar, one member of the army.

Under Prithvirajji (1786–1801)

Initially the council was successful in restoring order in the state but soon disagreement followed. Meghji Seth of Anjar established himself there as an almost independent ruler. To his party belonged the chief of Mandvi and Aima Bai, the mother of the Prithvirajji, and by their secession, the power of Dosal Ven and the other members of the council was greatly reduced. To add to the confusion two members of the council freed Rayadhan III from restraint.

The rest of the members of council left Bhuj and the disorders followed. Fateh Muhammad again placed Rayadhan under restraint. Thus he was admitted a member of Jamat. He with support of Jadeja chiefs and with his popularity in troops, Fateh Muhammad put an end to the supremacy of Dosal Ven who retired to Mundra and restored Prithvirajji to his proper position as the head of the state. As minister, Fateh Muhammad won regards of the young Prithvirajji, he secured the favour of the Jadejas by pensions; and, by raising a powerful body of mercenaries acted with such vigour against those who opposed him all the members of the council were either banished from Cutch, or placed in confinement. Fateh Muhammad administered the state from 1786 to 1801 unified the Kutch and stabilised the order. The prosperity of the state grew and he became popular among the people. When Prithvirajji arrived at mature age, he forced Fateh Muhammad to retire with help of Seth Hansraj. He retired under the agreement of Bhachau in 1801. After this the place of minister became a matter of keen dispute, and Muhammad Miyan, passed over in favour of Rana Hansraj. Scarcely were these troubles settled, when Prithvirajji died at the early age of twenty-seven.

Under Rayadhan III (1801–1813)

Rayadhan took over the administration again after the death of Prithvirajji. He tried kill Hansraj, who saved his life by fleeing to Mandvi. Rayadhan was at last independent. But he had no funds, and before long, wasforced to call Hansraj to his help. Hansraj came, and succeeding in placing Rayadhan under restraint, carried on the government at Bhuj. About this time (1802), he offered to cede Cutch to the British Government on condition that they would grant a maintenance to Rao Rayadhan and his relations.

Meanwhile, Fateh Muhammad was building port at Tuna near Anjar. His follower secretly communicated with Seth Hansraj, invited him to attack Anjar. Followers joined the force of Hansraj and attacked the town unsuccessfully. They returned to Bhuj where one day taking advantage of Hansraj's absence, on condition of a promise of the post of minister, set Rao Rayadhan free.

Fateh Muhammad, after his victory, continued to advance on Bhuj and put Rayadhan again under restraint. He rose to power in 1804 and gradually won the dissenting chiefs. He used force to extract revenues and levied fines to raise the money. He took over Mandvi in 1809 after death of Hansraj and negotiated with British agent James MacMurdo regarding piracy in Arabian Sea. During the siege of Kanthkot in Vagad his army suffered so severely that Fateh Muhammad was forced to retire to Bhuj; and there, after a few days, he died on 5 October 1813. Within a month (30 October 1813) of the death of Fateh Muhammad, Rao Rayadhan III sickened of fever and died.

Under Bharmalji II (1813–1814)

On the death of Fateh Muhammad, his two sons, Ibrahim Miyan and Husain Miyan, succeeded to him in Bar Bhayat ni Jamat, their councils being directed by their father's chief adviser, Seth Jasraj. Opposing insistence of others Miyan brothers supported claim of Mansingji to the throne. On 13 January 1814, Mansingji succeeded to the chiefship of Kutch as Bharmalji II on consideration of Bar Bhayat ni Jamat. The British Government agent Captain James MacMurdo went from Morbi to Bhuj in 1814 for presenting its demands to Husain Miyan regarding end of piracy in Arabian Sea and bandits in Vagad region. Rao Bharmal II took over the management of state and Husain Miyan retired in 1815
