= Patgadh =

Patgadh or Vagham Chavdagadh is a ruined historic settlement and capital of western Kutch during rule of Chawda dynasty. The ruins of the town are located in Lakhpat Taluka in Kutch district of Gujarat, India. The village is on the west bank of Little Rann of Kutch.

== History ==
There are the ruins of the old city of Vagham Chavda, who according to the ordinary story was, during the thirteenth century killed by his nephews Mod and Manai. The city seems to have stretched over more than two miles chiefly along the banks of the stream. The plots of ground known as the custom house, Mandvina Khetar, show where some of the offices of the old city stood. The lines of the town walls and the site of a dam, that must once have joined a large lake, may still be traced. There are heaps of ashes, apparently the sites of potter's kilns, and pieces of broken tiles and earthenware. Copper coins are sometimes found but so eaten with rust that when handled they crumble into dust. Two temples, though modern, stand on the sites of old buildings. The temple of Kateshvar, rebuilt in 1824 (Samvat 1881) by Kshatri Jetha Sundarji and Mehta Valabhji, is a sandstone shrine 8 feet square and 25 high, with a small porch supported by four square pillars. Inside in the centre is a linga, with an image of Hanuman on the right and of Ganpati on the left. The temple of Kalika Mata, on the site of, but on a smaller scale than, the old temple, was rebuilt in 1888 (Samvat 1895) by a Paramhansa, named Manchhanath. It faces the west, and consists of a shrine and a porch. On the lintel of the shrine are nine busts said to represent Vagham, his son, and the seven Sands, but more probably intended for the nine planets, Navagrahas. In the shrine stands Kalika, 2 1/2 feet high with four hands armed with spears and swords. One spear she thrusts into Mahishasur's body trampling with one foot on him. In the wall, opposite the image and above the entrance, are two stone busts found in the ruins of the old temple, and said to be those of Mod and Manai, the early Samma settlers in Cutch. An old wornout Kalika lies by the side of the new image, and outside is another likeness riding on a lion. In front of the porch is a sacrificial pond, kund, rebuilt in 1838 (Samvat 1895) by an Atit named Kashigar. It is considered holy and the people of the neighbouring villages go there to perform the Shraddh ceremony and release the ashes of their dead into the water. Half a mile to the west of the town, cut in the soft sandstone rock, is a hall thirty-five feet long, and thirty wide, supported on two eight feet high sixteen-sided pillars. On the right is a second room twelve feet square, and there is a third behind.
