= Shivaji (disambiguation) =

Shivaji (1630–1680) was an Indian warrior king and founder of the Maratha Empire.

Shivaji or Sivaji may also refer to:

== People ==
=== Historical people ===
- Shivaji of Thanjavur (fl. 1832–1855), Raja of the Bhosale dynasty
- Shivaji III, (1830–1866), Raja of Kolhapur of the Bhosale dynasty
- Shivaji III of Thanjavur (fl. 19th century), pretender to the throne of the Thanjavur Maratha kingdom
- Shivaji IV (1863–1883), Raja of Kolhapur of the Bhosale dynasty
- Shivaji V (1941–1946), Raja of Kolhapur of the Bhosale dynasty

=== Actors ===
- Sivaji Ganesan (1928–2001), Indian actor in Tamil, Telugu, Kannada, Malayalam and Hindi films
- Shivaji (Malayalam actor) (1957–2004)
- Sivaji (Telugu actor), active since 1997
- Shivaji Dev (born 1989), Indian actor in Tamil films, grandson of Sivaji Ganesan
- Shivaji Guruvayoor (born 1961), Indian actor in Malayalam films
- Shivaji Satam (born 1950), Indian actor in Hindi and Marathi films
- Sayaji Shinde (born 1959), Indian actor in Marathi, Hindi, Tamil, Telugu, Kannada, and Malayalam films
- Rajinikanth (born 1950), Indian actor in Tamil films, birth name Shivaji Rao Gaekwad
- Sivaji Raja (born 1962), Indian comedian and actor in Telugu films
- Shivaji Lotan Patil (born 1970), Indian film director

=== Politicians and activists ===
- Karem Shivaji (born 1978), Indian social activist
- Shivaji Mane, Indian politician

=== Others ===
- Shivaji Sawant (1940–2002), Indian novelist

== Places ==
- Sivaji Park, a park in Visakhapatnam, Andhra Pradesh, India
- Shivaji Park, a park in Mumbai, India
  - Shivaji Park Residential Zone
- Shivaji Park metro station, West Delhi, India
- Shivaji Place, a commercial centre in West Delhi, India
- Shivaji Hockey Stadium, New Delhi, India
  - Shivaji Stadium metro station

== Schools ==
- Shivaji College, a constituent college of the University of Delhi
- Shivaji College, Karwar, a college in Karnataka, India
- Shivaji High School, Karwar, a high school in Karnataka, India
- Shivaji University, a university in Kolhapur, Maharashtra, India

== Other uses ==
- Sivaji (film), a 2007 Indian Tamil film by S. Shankar
  - Sivaji (soundtrack), by A. R. Rahman
- Sivaji Productions, an Indian film distributing and producing company

== See also ==
- Shibaji, a 2008 Indian action thriller film
- Sibaji Bandyopadhyay, Indian writer
- Shivajinagar (disambiguation)
- Shiva (disambiguation)
- Shivji (disambiguation)
