= Tuna Port =

Sea port in Gujarat, India

- Interactive map of Tuna Port
- Location within Gujarat

Location
- Country: India
- Location: Tuna, Gujarat
- Coordinates: 22.9096°N 70.1032°E

Details
- Opened: 2015(Coal/LNG Terminal); 2022(Container Terminal)
- Operated by: Adani Kandla Bulk Terminal Private Limited (bulk terminal); Essar Ports (Container terminal)
- Owned by: Deendayal Port Authority (2015–present)
- Type of Harbor: all weather port
- No. of berths: 5

Statistics
- Annual container volume: 14 MMTA

Tuna Port is a all-weather working port in Tuna Village, Gujarat, India with capacity of 14 MMTPA. The port is located 15 KM from Kandla Port on South West direction, Gujarat.

== History ==
Tuna Port was developed during mid-eighteenth century by Rao of Cutch State. Fateh Mohammad (1786–1813), who served as regent of Cutch State had further developed the existing facilities at Mandvi, Tuna and Lakhpat ports, when he was appointed as regent during reign of Rao Rayadhan III of Kutch. There is a village by same name Tuna near the port from which Tuna Port got its name.

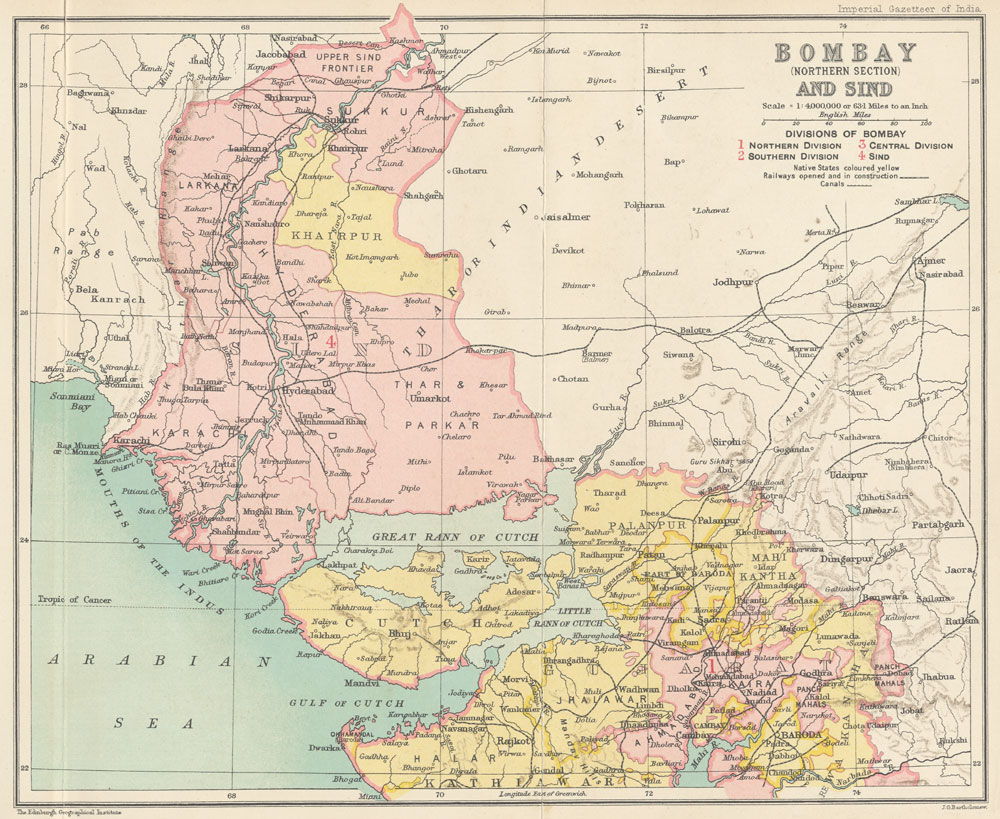
The 1909 Map of Bombay Presidency North, shows the Cutch State Railway's narrow gauge line connecting Bhuj with Tuna via Anjar. Note there is no mention of Kandla, as it was developed only after 1930.

In year 1900-01 during the reign of Jadeja King Maharao Shri Khengarji Bawa (1875–1942), the first railway lines from Tuna Port to Anjar were laid by narrow gauge line of Cutch State Railway, a railway promoted & owned by Princely State of Cutch. The first train from Tuna Port to Anjar ran in year 1905. The line was in 1908 extended to Bhuj, then the Capital of Princely State of Cutch. This rail-line from Tuna to Anjar, no longer exists. However, there are plans to again revive the railway link again.

Later, during decade of 1930, Tuna Port lost its importance, when Maharao Shri Khengarji III of Kutch, identified the location of present the Kandla Port and developed it as a new port. A new railway line connecting Anjar to Kandla were also laid by Cutch State Railway.

After the partition and independence of India and merger of Cutch into Union of India in 1947, in 1950 Kandla Port was selected by the Government of India to be developed as major port to replace the loss of Karachi, which went to Pakistan. The Kandla Railway Station was later renamed Gandhidham after the new town of same name was developed for the re-settlement of Sindhi refugees, who migrated from Pakistan upon Partition.

Tuna Port is operated by the Kandla Port Trust. The Trust decided to develop Tuna as a satellite port in Kutch to compete with the nearby privately owned Mundra Port operated by Adani Group. This is the second port after Vadinar Port to be developed by Kandla Port Trust.

The new port was initially built as a coal importing terminal and commissioned in 2015 with an annual handling capacity of over 20 million tonnes. Tuna Port was initially operated by the Kandla Port Trust.

A new container terminal is under-construction by Essar Ports Ltd. The total cost of the project is Rs 2,276.06 crore, comprising an investment of Rs 1,552.57 crore by Essar Ports and Rs 723.49 crore by Deendayal Port Authority.

Currently, Tuna Port is operated by Adani Group by Adani Kandla Bulk Terminal Private Limited.

== Connectivity ==
The nearest Airport is Kandla Airport and Rail-head is Anjar and Gandhidham.
