= Bharmalji II =

Ruler of Kutch from 1814–1819

Maharajadhiraj Mirza Maharao Bharmalji II

Maharaja of Kutch
- Reign: 13 January 1814 − 25 March 1819
- Predecessor: Bar Bhayat ni Jamat
- Successor: Deshalji II
- Regent of Bar Bhayat ni Jamat: Husain Miyan
- Born: Mansingji; 1798
- Died: 1846 (aged 47–48)
- House: Rajput
- Father: Rayadhan III

Maharajadhiraj Mirza Maharao Bharmalji II (reign: 6 November 1814 − 25 March 1819) was the Rao of Cutch belonging to Rajput dynasty, who ascended the throne of Princely State of Cutch one month after the death of his father Rayadhan III.

== Reign ==
The Kutch was governed by Bar Bhayat ni Jamat after the death of Rayadhan III and his regent Fateh Muhammad in 1813. Husain Miyan and his brother Ibrahim Miyan succeeded Fateh Muhammad, their councils being directed by their father's chief adviser, Jagjivan Mehta, a Nagar Brahmin. As Rayadhan had no legitimate children, Ladhubha, his brother's son, a boy eleven years old, had in 1809, in the negotiations with the British Government, been considered heir. But on the Rao's death, the two brothers, Husain Miyan and Ibrahim Miyan, supported the claim of Mansingji his illegitimate son.

On 13 January 1814, Mansingji succeeded to the chiefship of Kutch with the title of Maharajadhiraj Mirza Maharao Bharmalji II. The British Government agent Captain MacMurdo went from Morvi to Bhuj in 1814 for presenting its demands to Husain Miyan regarding piracy in the Arabian Sea and bandits in the Vagad region. Rao Bharmal II took over the management of state and Husain Miyan retired in January 1815 under the acceptance of the fiefdom of Anjar, Bhachau, Bhadargad and Kanthkot. Rao chose as ministers Shivraj of Mandvi and Askarn.

On 14 December, a British force under Colonel East consisting of about 4000 fighting men, together with troops of Gaekwad of Baroda State, crossed the Rann at Venasa about twelve miles east of Anjar. The force moved on Anjar, and as Husain Miyan refused to let the British occupy it, the fort was attacked on the morning of 25 December 1815, and before evening was surrendered. Its port of Tuna was occupied the next day. A few days later, Muhammad Sota, the chief of Mundra, negotiated and agreed to the British. The force next moved towards Bhuj, encamping at Lakond on 3 January 1816. On 14 January 1816, the Rao Bharmal II agreed to the suzerainty of the British and Captain James MacMurdo was appointed as the British Resident at Bhuj and Collector of Anjar.

With support of some Jadeja chiefs, the British troops attacked Bhuj on 25 March 1819, and disposed Rao Bharmal II and his son Deshalji II, a minor was made the ruler of Cutch State. Kutch accepted the suzerainty of British in 1819 and Captain James MacMurdo was posted as British Political Resident stationed at Bhuj. During his minority the affairs of the State were managed by Council of Regency, which was composed of Jadeja chiefs and headed by Captain MacMurdo.

Bharmalji II Jadeja Dynasty Born: 1798 Died: 1846
Regnal titles
Preceded by Bar Bhayat ni Jamat	Maharaja of Kutch; 13 January 1814 − 25 March 1819	Succeeded by Deshalji II
