= Rajaram of Thanjavur =

Srimant Rajasri Rajaram Rajah Sahib Bhonsle Chhatrapati (Rajaram) was the eldest son of Prathapasimha by his first wife and the younger brother of Shivaji III of Thanjavur. He succeeded his uncle Shivaji III as the Senior Prince of Thanjavur and the head of the House of Bhonsle on the former's death.

Preceded by Shivaji III	Senior Prince of Thanjavur	Succeeded by Shivaji IV
