= Ramgadh =

Village in Kutch, Gujarat

Coordinates: 23.706938°N 70.852075°E

Ramgadh (officially Fatehgadh) is a town near Rapar of Kutch district of Gujarat, India.

== History ==
The town was founded in the early 19th century by, and called after, the minister of Cutch State, Fateh Muhammad (1786–1813). Partially fortifying the town, he made it so secure that, in a short time, he drew within its walls the people of most of the villages around. By carefully protecting from robber attacks the passage across the Rann of Kutch to Gujarat, traders came to settle at Ramgadh and a few years later, in the time of the 1823 famine, many of them made large fortunes. In 1828, it was one of the most prosperous villages in the Vagad region of Kutch with a population of 2000 people.
