= Shivajinagar Assembly constituency =

Shivajinagar Assembly constituency may refer to these electoral constituencies in India:

- Shivajinagar, Karnataka Assembly constituency
- Shivajinagar, Maharashtra Assembly constituency
- Mankhurd Shivaji Nagar Assembly constituency, Maharashtra

== See also ==
- Shivajinagar (disambiguation)
