= Jairam Shivji =

- Born: c. 1792; Mundra, Kutch, India
- Died: 1866
- Occupations: Merchant and banker

Jairam Shivji (c. 1792–1866) was an Indian merchant and banker from Kutch, India, who operated from Zanzibar and Muscat. Having almost monopolized the entire Zanzibar market, he was the wealthiest person in East Africa during his career there.

== Biography ==
Jairam Shivji was born in 1792 into a Bhatia family in Mundra, Kutch. (Note: Not in Lakhpat as mentioned by Nicolini.) His father Shivji Topan was a merchant operating from Muscat, who had accompanied the Sultan of Oman on an expedition to maintain his influence in East Africa in 1785 along with another merchant named Vansanji Haridas Bhimani.

During the period of exponentially growing trade with the western world, the Omani Sultanate contracted various authorities and firms to collect custom duties at various places. Shivji Topan secured a contract to collect custom duties in Zanzibar in 1819. The competing firm of Bhimanis received the contract in 1833 for MT$70,000 but Shivji Topan regained the contract in 1835 for MT$84,000.

Shivji joined his father and uncle Madhavji Topan as an apprentice and later succeeded his father. He secured the contract at Zanzibar for MT$1,10,000. He further obtained contracts in mainland at Mombasa and at Marima in 1837. He also received contracts at Mafia and Lindi in the 1840s though they were continued as sublets of local governors. By 1850, he had contracts for collecting custom duties for all businesses from Cape Delgado to Mogadishu. He subsequently consolidated the custom collection for the Omani Sultanate and controlled commerce on the one thousand mile long coastline. His head office was located at Zanzibar and the local custom collectors were Kutchi Banias. They were also known as Port Indians or Banian Forodha. Later they were known as 'Jiram Sewji'.

Shivji had employed 150 guards to defend Zanzibar and the custom office was located at Furzani quarters near salt bazaar. His officials included Laddha Damji at Zanzibar, Laxmidas at Mombasa, Trikamdas at Pagini, Ramji Pragji at Bagamoyo, his nephew Pisu at Pemba Island and Kisandas at Kilwa.

The Omani Sultan could draw funds from his firm by writing Barwas (chits) and it increased their dependency on him. The Sultan had turned down higher bids for custom contract in 1841 in favour of Jairam Shivji who continued to increase revenue for him. The revenue reached MT$2,20,000 by 1856. The contract help him by dominating the business in Zanzibar. By 1850s, Shivji had offices in Zanzibar, the Persian Gulf, Muscat, Mundra and Mandvi. He also had offices in the Fort and Bazargate of Bombay. They had an association with a monastery in Mandvi where a draft issued in Zanzibar can be encashed.

Sultan Sayyid Said had forbidden the killing of cows in the vicinity of his house during the Eid al-Fitr, to respect Shivji's religious beliefs.

== Death and legacy ==
Shivji died on 25 August 1866. He came to be known as Swahili and his family adopted the surname Swali. A street near his house in Mundra became known as Swali Sheri.
