= Godji II =

Maharaja of Kutch from 1760 to 1778

Maharaja of Kutch
- Reign: 1760 – 1778
- Predecessor: Lakhpatji
- Successor: Rayadhan III
- Born: 1734
- Died: 1778 (aged 43–44)
- Issue: Rayadhan III, Prithvirajji
- Dynasty: Jadeja Rajput
- Father: Lakhpatji

Rao Godji II, was the Rao of Cutch belonging to Jadeja Rajput dynasty, who ascended the throne of Princely State of Cutch in 1760 and ruled until 1778 when he died. During his rein, the state was invaded by Kalhoras and Talpuras of Sindh several times.

== Early life ==
Godji was the son of Rao of Cutch state, Lakhpatji. At the age of sixteen, he demanded from his father a share in the management of the state as his father did with his grandfather Deshalji I. He was stirred by his mother and Punja, the former minister of his father. Godji was refused by his father and he retired to Mundra with his mother leaving Bhuj. Before moving to Mundra, Punja planned to ruin his rival minister Gordhan Mehta who was later executed under suspicion of treachery.

Godji lived in Mundra independent of his father. Though chiefly advised by Punja, he trusted much to one Mirza Amir Beg whom he made his army chief. About this time, a certain Shah Madanji, a very rich merchant, died in Mundra, and to his funeral ceremonies some of the wealthiest men in Cutch came. Acting on his Jamadar's advice, Godji, who was badly off for funds, shut the city gates and refused to let the merchants go till they paid large sums of money. Enraged at his son's conduct, Lakhapatji sent a force against Mundra. Godji fled to Morbi, and being supplied with troops, came back, drove off the attacking force, and relieved the town. The Rao at length compromised with his son allowing him to keep Mundra on condition that he would dismiss Punja. To this Godji agreed, and in 1758 Punja retired to Mothala in Abdasa, on a monthly pension of about £25 (1000 koris).

== Rule ==
In 1760, Lakhapatji who had been suffering from leprosy and other diseases, died. On his death-bed Lakhpatji tried to induce the officers of his troops to appoint one of his six illegitimate sons. They refused sent message to Godji who came and succeeded without opposition and began to rule at the age of twenty-six. He continued as minister a Lohana named Jivan Seth, who had held the post during the last years of his father's reign and refused Punja the post who had hurried from his retirement in Junagadh with expectation of reward of his former help. After denied entry at various places and saving his life from cavalry troops in Jativada, he retired to Virawah in Parkar, Sindh.

Punja corresponded with Gidomal, the minister of Sindh, who was of his own caste. Mian Ghulam Shah Kalhoro, then reigning in Sindh, had invited Hyderabad; sent him £1500 (1000 mohars) for his expenses and a palanquin with an escort of 100 men; and on his arrival received him with every honour. Kalhora explained his wish to conquer Kutch, and gain the Rao's sister in marriage.

Punja was not encouraged by the idea of conquest but agreed to the idea of marriage. He advised that his proposal would be entertained only if he defeat the Rao of Cutch. Rao heard about the incoming army and directed Jivan to summon the Abdasa and Vagad Girasias to defend the country. The whole Bhayat, except the Mothala chief who was friendly to Punja, readily answered the summons, and took the field under the minister. Godji remained in command at Bhuj which he garrisoned with 1000 men from Navanagar and a body of Radhanpur troops.

=== First Sindh invasion and Battle of Jara ===
Ghulam Shah and Punja, at the head of the Sindhi army, quit Hyderabad accompanied by an immense body of followers, who, it is said, raised the strength of the expedition to about 70,000 men. Crossing the Rann, the Sindh army, after a heavy march of twenty seven miles, found Nara deserted, and the wells filled with stones. So great was their distress from thirst and fatigue, that had Jivan marched against them, they would have fallen an easy prey. But the minister was no general, and, quietly encamping in a strong position close by on the Jara hills, allowed the Sindh troops to refresh themselves.

After two days' rest Ghulam Shah marched to Jara and attacked the hill. The approach was defended by a large gun round which the Cutch army were gathered. At the first shot the gun burst doing much injury and causing great confusion in the Kutch ranks. Taking advantage of the disorder, the Sindh soldiers climbed the hill sword in hand, and destroyed almost the whole army, leaving among the slain Jivan the minister, three sons of the Thakor of Nara, and many other leading chiefs. According to Cutch accounts their total loss was not less than a hundred thousand slain.

From Jara, Ghulam Shah, marching to Tera, levied a heavy fine, and plundered and burned the country. Learning of this crushing defeat, the Rao, sending a private agent to Punja, confessed his unjust conduct, stated that he had been deceived by Jivan, and entreating Punja to arrange that the Sindh army should be withdrawn, invited him as his minister to Bhuj, and promised to ratify any agreement he should make with Ghulam Shah. His return to favour at Bhuj secured, Punja was not less anxious than the Rao to get rid of the Sindh army.

To arrange this without losing credit with Ghulam Shah seemed well high hopeless. But affairs took a turn that made his part easier to play. News that the wells on the straight road to Bhuj had been poisoned led Ghulam Shah to advance by a longer route. As he went, he succeeded in levying sums of money from several chiefs. But a force sent against Sandhan was repulsed. When the news of this check reached Ghulam Shah, Punja was with him. Affecting a keen alarm, he warned Ghulam Shah that there were 360 forts each as strong as Sandhan, and that Bhuj itself was guarded by the choicest troops of Navanagar and Radhanpur. So far, he urged, Ghulam Shah's success was complete, and he engaged that if Ghulam withdrew, he would go to Bhuj and arrange the marriage with the Rao's sister.

To this Ghulam Shah agreed, and, taking with him Punja's son as a hostage, retired to Sindh. On reaching Bhuj the Rao received Punja with every sign of respect, and at once made him minister. After fulfilling his preliminary agreement with Ghulam Shah, Punja's first measure was, partly by firmness and partly by paying their arrears, to dismiss the Radhanpur army which held the gates, and in defiance of Godji showed every wish to remain masters at Bhuj. During the next two years Punja was occupied in an expedition into Vagad where he levied a fine on Kanthkot and the chiefs of the district. All this time, though Punja never ceased urging him, the Rao had failed to give his sister in marriage to Ghulam Shah. From this constant subject of dispute, and perhaps from the manner in which he had regained his post, the Rao was never well disposed to Punja; and, when he had repaired his forts, raised a militia, and established his power, he determined to rid himself of his minister. By his order Punja was seized, confined in irons for ten days, and, by the Rao himself, was presented with a cup of poison.

=== Second Sindh invasion ===
On hearing of Punja's murder, Ghulam Shah gathered another army of 50,000 men, and re-entered Kutch by the Nara route. Nara he again found deserted, and except at the small fort of Muru, where a Rajput garrison of eighty men resisted and were all massacred, he advanced unopposed within sight of Bhuj. Encamping at Rodar Mata within five miles of the town, he despatched his minister, Gidomal, with some men of distinction to demand, as had before been promised, the Rao's sister in marriage. Godji, well supplied with troops and resources, received the envoys with little courtesy, and refused to give any satisfactory answer. During the night the envoys passed in Bhuj, the Rao ordered that, at the same moment, every gun in the city should be fired. This caused the strangers such alarm that they took back with them the most exaggerated accounts of the height of the walls and the strength of the town.

After a few days skirmishing, Ghulam Shah was induced to listen to a compromise, by which, instead of the Rao's sister, he received in marriage the daughter of the chief of Khakhar, a near kinsman of the Rao. After remaining for some time inactive he recrossed the Ran, leaving at Lakhpat a post of 5000 men. About this time by building at Ali Bandar a bank across the Kori mouth of the Indus, Ghulam Shah stopped the source from which the great rice-lands of Lakhpat drew their water supply; and the rice tract gradually became a salt waste like the rest of the Rann, leaving the Cutch state poorer by a yearly sum of about £20,000 (8 lakhs of koris). In 1772, seven years after his return to Sindh, Ghulam Shah died, and was succeeded by his son Sarfaraz. This prince was soon involved in troubles at his own court, and was obliged to withdraw his outpost from Lakhpat. At the same time he allowed Devji, the son of Punja, to leave his court and return to Bhuj. Devji was well received by the Rao, and offered employment. But warned by the fate of his father and grandfather, he asked leave to retire and re-people Lakhpat. This was granted, and from the respect in which his family was held, he succeeded so well that the Rao, having the highest opinion of his abilities, anxious to get him as minister, ordered him to Bhuj. He started for the capital, but, on his way, was poisoned by some of the Darbar people who dreaded his influence.

After Punja's death a succession of ministers followed, most of whom were murdered and their property seized by the Rao. During these changes the Rao, without a struggle, lost Balamba in Kathiawar. Godji, naturally of a suspicious temper, had for some time entertained a continued dread of assassination. This fear led him to collect a small body of Sidis who continued to increase in number till all the power of the Darbar rested with them. So overbearing were they that, at last, the ladies and principal officers of the palace, to free the Rao from their power, seized his person and kept him in confinement till the whole body of Sidis, more than 400 in all, were driven from Kutch. Enraged at this insult Godji retired in disgust to Mandvi where he stayed building a palace and paying no heed to public affairs.

=== Third Sindh invasion ===
About 1775, Miyan Sarfaraz Khan (1772–1777), Ghulam Shah's son, the Kalhora ruler of Hyderabad in Sindh, entering Cutch, took the route of Khavda and Sumrasar, intending to march to Bhuj, but the accounts of its strength frightened him, and leading the army to Chobari and Kanthkot, he married the daughter of the Thakor, and levying fines at Adhoi and other places returned to Sindh.

=== Fourth Sindh invasion ===
At this time (1776–1786), in Sind, the struggles between the Kalhoras and Talpuras divided the country into two factions. Abdul Nabbi Khan, who succeeded in 1771, had appointed Mir Bijr his minister. On Mir Bijr's elevation to power, two Beluchis, who had assassinated his father, sought refuge in Kutch, and, as the Rao refused to give them up, the province was again invaded and much of Abdasa plundered and laid waste. The Rao's mercenaries, at this time a very formidable body, sent under the command of one Mirza Kurpa Beg against the Sindh army, fell in with a detachment of it and cut it to pieces, and the people of the country aiding the Rao's troops, the invaders were forced to retreat across the Rann with considerable loss and disgrace. Elated by his success, Mirza Kurpa Beg, upon his return to Bhuj, threw off all subjection to the Rao and began to act with great insolence, especially towards the two Sindh refugees. Complaining to the Rao, the refugees were encouraged, if the chance offered, to assassinate Mirza Beg. Not many days after the Mirza sent for them and being refused a sum of money, ordered their wives and children to be sold. Enraged at this insult the Beluchis attacked him and slew him on the spot. For this deed of valour the Rao rewarded them with handsome grants of land.

=== Death ===
Soon after this Godji sickened, it was said of leropsy, and died at the age of forty-four, in 1778. He left two sons, Rayadhan III who succeeded, and Prithvirajji. He had married one of his sisters to Damaji Gaekwad of Baroda State.

== Political Office ==
Godji II Jadeja Dynasty Born: 1734 Died: 1778
Regnal titles
Preceded by Lakhpatji	Maharaja of Kutch; 1760 – 1778	Succeeded by Rayadhan III
