= Shivajinagar, Chandrapur =

Shivajinagar majri
- city
- Location in Maharashtra, India
- Coordinates: 20.1463°N 79.0004°E
- Country: India
- State: Maharashtra
- District: Chandrapur

Population (2001)
  - Total: 28,793

Languages
  - Official: Marathi
- Time zone: UTC+5:30 (IST)
- ISO 3166 code: IN-MH
- Vehicle registration: MH
- Website: maharashtra.gov.in

Shivajinagar is a city and a majri municipal council in Chandrapur district in the Indian state of Maharashtra.

== Demographics ==
As of 2001 India census, Shivajinagar had a population of 28,793. Males constitute 53% of the population and females 47%. Shivajinagar has an average literacy rate of 68%, higher than the national average of 59.5%: male literacy is 76% and female literacy is 59%. In Shivajinagar, 14% of the population is under 6 years of age.

Year	Male	Female	Total Population	Change	Religion (%)							
Year	Male	Female	Total Population	Change	Hindu	Muslim	Christian	Sikhs	Buddhist	Jain	Other religions and persuasions	Religion not stated
2001	7897	6900	14797	-	79.280	9.536	1.311	0.608	9.123	0.034	0.000	0.108
2011	7312	6565	13877	-0.062	77.625	12.820	0.656	0.461	8.244	0.022	0.000	0.173
