= Shivaji Nagar metro station =

Shivaji Nagar metro station may refer to:

- Shivaji Nagar metro station (Bengaluru), an upcoming metro station on the Pink Line of Namma Metro
- Shivaji Nagar metro station (Pune), a metro station on the Purple Line of Pune Metro
