= Shivaji III of Thanjavur =

Pretender to the Thanjavur Maratha kingdom throne

Shivaji III was a pretender to the throne of the Thanjavur Maratha kingdom. He was the only son of Serfoji III, adopted son of Shivaji II, the last Maratha ruler of Thanjavur. He held the title "Senior Prince of Tanjore".

Preceded by Serfoji III	Senior Prince of Thanjavur	Succeeded by Rajaram
