= Fateh Muhammad =

- Wazir of Cutch State

Regent of Bar Bhayat ni Jamat
- Reign: 1786–1801; 1804–1813
- Predecessor: Meghji Seth
- Successor: Hussain Miyan
- Born: 1752; Sindh
- Died: 1813 (aged 60–61); Cutch
- Issue: Ibrahim Miyan; Hussain Miyan
- Religion: Islam

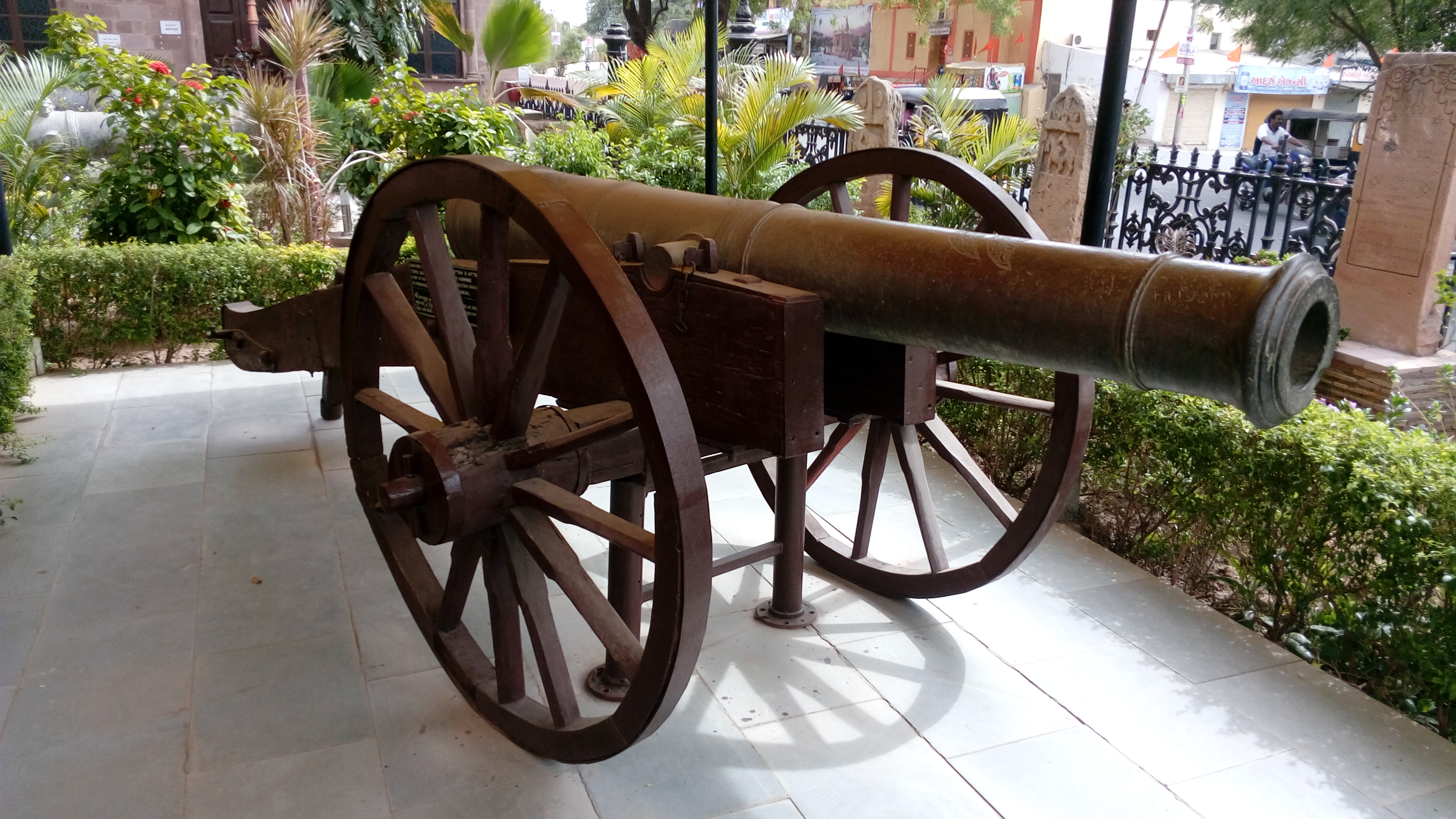
Cannon Haidari, a cannon gifted by Tipu Sultan to Fateh Muhammad.

Fateh Muhammad (1752–1813) was a regent who administered Cutch State as a leader of Bar Bhayat ni Jamat under titular kings, Prithvirajji and Rayadhan III.

== Career ==
=== Background ===
Fateh Muhammad, a Notiyar Muslim of Sindhi descent, born in 1752, who was a Jamadar under Cutch state. Maharao Rayadhan III was deposed by the revolt of Jamadars, the local chiefs, led by Meghji Sheth of Anjar and placed under restraint in 1786.

The chief actors, the Jamadars and Meghji Seth, raised Prithvirajji, Rayadhan's younger brother to the chiefship, appointed during his minority a council known as the Bar Bhayat ni Jamat which was a congregation of power. Initially the council was successful in restoring order in the state but soon disagreement followed. Meghji Seth, convicted of an attempt to poison some of the members, was forced to flee. Seeking shelter in his old province of Anjar he established himself there as an almost independent ruler. To his party belonged the chief of Mandvi and Aima Bai, the mother of the Prithvirajji, and by their secession, the power of Dosal Ven and the other members of the council was greatly reduced. To add to the confusion two members of the council freed Rayadhan III from restraint.

The rest of the members of council left Bhuj and the disorders followed. One day Rao attacked Fateh Muhammad who had to fly for his life. Strengthening himself in one of the towers of the city wall he resisted the Rao's attacks, and with the help of Dosal Ven, defeated the Rao and again placed him under restraint. Thus he was admitted a member of Jamat. For a year matters went quietly. But Dosal Ven, the head of the council, too sure of his position, neither took pains to treat the Rao with respect nor to win the regard of the Jadeja chiefs. Taking advantage of Dosal Ven's want of popularity, Fateh Muhammad withdrew for a time from Bhuj, and, finding that the Jadeja chiefs were annoyed with Dosal Ven's treatment of the Rao, he in Dosal's absence came back to Bhuj. Always a favourite with the troops, Fateh Muhammad had little difficulty in putting an end to Dosal's supremacy and restoring Prithvirajji to his proper position as the head of the state. As minister, Fateh Muhammad won regards of the young Prithvirajji, he secured the favour of the Jadejas by pensions; and, by raising a powerful body of mercenaries t acted with such vigour against those who opposed him, that except Dosal Ven, who retired to Mundra, all the members of the council were either banished from Cutch, or placed in confinement.

=== Fateh Muhammad's administration (1786–1801) ===
He next turned his attention to the outlying parts of the province, which during the eight years of weak and divided rule had fallen into disorder and become a prey to the raids of Miyana and Khosa robbers. Vagad was brought under order and made to pay revenue. The town of Sanva, whose unruly chief had refused to pay tribute was taken and plundered, and its bands of robbers broken and driven out of the country. After Vagad had been brought under order, only two towns resisted the Rao's authority. One of these, Mundra in which Dosal Ven had settled, was attacked and surrendered, Dosal Ven withdrawing with a pension to Betta in Abdasa. As Mandvi, the only remaining town, was too strong to be taken by assault. Fateh Muhammad made ready a fleet of boats and seized its rich trading vessels. Disgusted with their loss, the Mandvi merchants determined to quit Mandvi, whose ruler gave them no protection. Anticipating this result, Fateh Muhammad came to meet them restored their property. In return for this generous treatment the merchants went back to Mandvi, bought over the garrison, and delivered the place into Fateh Muhammad's hands. Besides in bringing disorderly vassals to obedience, Fateh Muhammad spread the Rao's power by recovering arrears of tribute from the Jam of Navanagar State, and obtained from the Girasias the cession of the Bhachau district in Vagad, which under his management became one of the richest and most populous parts of Kutch. One of his projects of improvement was to make Lakhpat a great port. A fort was built and the place prospered, its revenue doubling in a few years. With the establishment of order he introduced a system of strict and fair government in Kutch. To each district he appointed a manager, and forced them to treat the people with great consideration. At the same time, so long as they had his confidence, he placed in their hands almost unlimited power, neither listening to stories against them nor cramping them by requiring too close an adherence to rules. He thus roused an enthusiasm among his dependents who carried out his orders with a spirit and trust that ensured success. His example was worthy of his precepts. Though the number of his mercenaries was much increased, he, seldom in passing through the country, allowed one of his men to enter a village. The headmen had beforehand orders for supplies, and the greatest care was taken to prevent irregularities. During these years, Kutch, favoured with fruitful seasons, recovered from its misrule, and probably at no time was its trade or its revenue more flourishing.

=== Fall of Fateh Muhammad (1801) ===
Prosperity lasted till Rao Prithvirajji, arrived at mature age, began to view with jealousy his minister's almost absolute power. The first open rupture was in 1801 at a pleasure party, on the Bhuj lake. Prithviji had been drinking, and on some trifling difference of opinion, he not only accused Fateh Muhammad of rebellious intentions, but would have attacked him had he not been held back.

Afterwards there was a show of reconciliation, but Prithviji had lost trust in Fateh Muhammad, and only waited a favourable opportunity of separating from him. Matters came to a crisis, when, shortly after, the Prithvirajji asked for and was refused the revenues of the town of Mandvi. With his friends he now planned an escape from Bhuj, and on a day when Fateh Muhammad was absent at Lakhpat, the officer in charge of Bhachau sent troops to escort the Rao to Mandvi, where Hansraj, the commandant of the town, received him, declared in his favour, and drove out the militia that continued true to Fateh Muhammad's interests. On reaching Lakhpat, Fateh Muhammad heard of the Rao's flight and turning back with all speed collected his forces at Bhuj. Under Askarn Seth he sent a detachment to the Machhu Kantha to prevent the arrival of troops from the Morbi chief.

This body of men did good service, attacking and defeating a formidable force coming to the Rao's assistance from Radhanpur, and then at Patri, on the way to Mandvi, defeating a detachment sent against them by Hansraj. While thus successful, they were suddenly recalled to Bhuj, where Fateh Muhammad, deserted by one of his chief supporters the commandant of Lakhpat, and badly off for funds, had determined to centre his forces. The Rao now moved against Bhuj, and being joined by many bands of mercenaries, became so strong that Fateh Muhammad feeling resistance useless, agreed to surrender the capital, if he were given the estates of Anjar and Bhachau.

Accepting these terms Prithvirajji and Hansraj took possession of Bhuj. Before leaving Bhuj, Fateh Muhammad set free Rayadhan III. Rayadhan was at first most grateful to them for his freedom, and at last, with much trouble was pacified by a daily grant of about £8 (300 koris). After this the place of minister became a matter of keen dispute, and Muhammad Miyan, passed over in favour of Hansraj, was so displeased that he retired to Mundra. Scarcely were these troubles settled, when Prithvirajji died at the early age of twenty-seven.

=== Rayadhan III ===
Rao Rayadhan, who had so far submitted chiefly from respect to his brother, now insisted on resuming his authority. He tried kill Hansraj, who saved his life by a speedy retreat to Mandvi. Rayadhan was at last independent. But he had no funds, and before long, was forced to call Hansraj to his help. Hansraj came, and succeeding in placing Rayadhan under restraint, carried on the government at Bhuj. About this time (1802), he offered to cede Cutch to the British Government on condition that they would grant a maintenance to Rao Rayadhan and his relations.

Meanwhile, Fateh Muhammad, remaining quiet at Anjar, busied himself in extending its trade and establishing: a harbour at Tuna Port. In these schemes and in keeping up a large body of mercenaries he spent more than his income, and looking about for some way to raise money, made so heavy a demand from his follower Askarn, that he, entering into secret communication with Hansraj, invited him to attack Anjar, and flying from the town joined his troops. They advanced together against Anjar; but after remaining some days before the town, were forced to return to Bhuj. Shortly afterwards, at Bhuj, Askarn taking advantage of Hansraj's absence, on condition of a promise of the post of minister, set Rao Rayadhan free. But none of the districts would admit Askarn's authority or pay him revenue, and failing in another attack on Anjar he had again to fly to Bhuj. The people rose against him due to his extractions, and the Rao, hearing their complaints, ordered him to be seized and put to death. Askarn saved his life by taking shelter in Muhammad Pana's mosque and afterwards escaped with only two horsemen.

=== Fateh Muhammad's administration (1804–1813) ===
Fateh Muhammad, after his victory over Askarn, continued to advance on Bhuj, and, finding the mercenaries friendly, he was at night secretly admitted into the town. His troops had scarcely entered when they were attacked by Rayadhan, who had always a strong dislike to Fateh Muhammad, and was now determined to dispute his possession of Bhuj. Rao Rayadhan was wounded in the fight.

Fateh Muhammad rose to power in 1804 but had lost his trust in Kutch militia. He gradually disbanded them, and in their stead brought in foreigners from Sindh and the neighbouring provinces. He started to bring the towns under his rule. Between 1804 and 1808 he four times advanced against Lakhpat, but on each occasion had to retire defeated. His efforts against Mandvi, where Hansraj was now settled, were attended with little better success. For a time Hansraj was forced to pay. But some excuse for refusing was always ready, and in the fight between the two rivals the whole country round was laid waste.

Short of funds, Fateh Muhammad added to his revenue by levying fines and forced contributions. The whole of the Miyanas' villages were taxed, and even towns granted in religious gift did not escape. One of these exactions nearly cost Fateh Muhammad his life. Gajoji, a local chief, agreed, on promise of a share in the plunder, to help Fateh Muhammad to recover a heavy fine from the village of Fasura, The fine was levied, but the chief was paid no share of it, and at last, weary with waiting, he in open court, attacked Fateh Muhammad, and, before lie was cut down, gave him a very serious sword wound. On recovering from his wound, Fateh Muhammad, at the instigation of the chief of Adesar, marched into eastern Cutch and remained in Vagad region during the greater part of this and the two following years (1809–1812). While here, he raised large sums by fines and exactions, driving people from the Girasia towns and villages and forcing them to settle in a newly founded town which he named Fatehgadh. He negotiated with the British regarding piracy in the Arabian Sea and Bandits from Vagad region.When Hansraj died in 1809, Fateh Muhammad tried to take over Mandvi.

During the next two years (1810 - 1812) Fateh Muhammad's chief care was to raise the revenue. He negotiated with British government agent Captain James MacMurdo regarding piracy in Arabian Sea and bandits from Vagad region. Kutch with other parts of North Gujarat suffered from locusts in 1811 and from a failure of rain in 1812, and in the next season, among the people reduced by want and crowded into the larger towns; a pestilence broke out that, carrying off half of their number, paralyzed the whole population. From this pestilence Fateh Muhammad did not escape. During the siege of Kanthkot in Vagad his army suffered so severely that he was forced to retire to Bhuj; and there, after a few days he died on 5 October 1813 due to the disease.

Within a month (30 October 1813) of the death of Fateh Muhammad, Rao Rayadhan III died. Though he wanted to be buried as Muslim customs, his family cremated his body as Hindu customs.

On the death of Fateh Muhammad, his two sons, Ibrahim Miyan and Husain Miyan, succeeded to him in Bar Bhayat ni Jamat. They raised Bharmalji II to the chiefship of the state.

== Political Office ==
Fateh Muhammad Regent of Bar Bhayat ni Jamat
Regnal titles
| Preceded by Meghji Sheth | Vazier of Maharaja of Kutch Prithvirajji and Rayadhan III; 1786 - 1801, 1804 - 1813 | Succeeded by Husain Miyan |
