= Rayadhan III =

Ruler of Kutch from 1778–1786

Maharaja of Kutch
- First reign: 1778 – 1786
- Predecessor: Godji II
- Successor: Prithvirajji
- Second reign: 1801 − 30 October 1813
- Predecessor: Prithvirajji
- Successor: Bar Bhayat ni Jamat
- Regent of Bar Bhayat ni Jamat: Fateh Muhammad
- Born: 1763
- Died: 30 October 1813 (aged 49–50)
- Dynasty: Jadeja Rajput

Rao Rayadhan III was the Rao of Cutch belonging to Jadeja Rajput dynasty, who ascended the throne of the Princely State of Cutch in 1778 and ruled until 1786 when he was deposed. He again ruled as titular head under a council of Bar Bhayat ni Jamat from 1801 to 1813.

== Reign ==
=== First reign (1778–1786) ===
Rayadhan III succeeded his father Godji II, in 1778, at the early age of fifteen when the state was under disturbance and the revenues were exhausted due to battles. Under his mother's influence, he appointed Devchand, a Lohana by caste, as his minister who had managed the state under the former reign. One day Devchand was arrested by the commander of the Rao's body-guard under suspicion, and, shortly after, his three brothers, who held Anjar, Mundra, and Rapar, were seized and brought to Bhuj, where the whole family, including Devchand, were put to death. His mother died soon and the state fell into disturbance again. Rao appointed Sidi Merich, the governor of Bhuj, as his minister. Vagha Parekh, a Vania by caste, attacked the Jadeja chief of Patri and slaying him took his fort. This severity gave great offence, and Sidi Merich seeing that Vagha Parekh's conduct made Rao Rayadhan III himself unpopular tried to assassinate him. The attempt failed and Vagha winning over the nobles and the ladies of the palace procured the banishment of the whole body of Sidi mercenaries. But Vagha's success was short-lived. One of the Sidis, Masud by name, who, as a personal favourite of the Rao's was allowed to remain, before long succeeded in bringing about his imprisonment and death.

About this time (1783) the Raja of Jodhpur, at the head of an army, passed through Kutch on his way to Sindh to restore Abdul Nabbi Khan, who had been driven from his kingdom by the Talpuras. The Raja tried to persuade the Rao to help him. But affairs at Bhuj were in too great disorder to allow of ready aid, and, before anything could be done, the Jodhpur army, after a contest with Mir Fateh Ali at Chobari, were forced to retire in disorder. Rayadhan was disliked due to his conduct and his minister Vagha Parekh, suddenly brought a body of troops from Anjar into the courtyard of the Bhuj palace. Getting timely news of their arrival, the Rao, sending word to his body-guard, escaped to the top of the palace, and cutting away the stair gave his Pathans time to assemble and come to his rescue. With their help the whole body of the assailants was destroyed. Though successful for the moment, the Rao's conduct had estranged all his servants, and from this time his authority was no longer acknowledged. Mandvi under Ramji Khavas, Anjar under Meghji Seth, and Mundra, Lakhpat, and several other towns under other leaders became independent. The Miyanas, gathering in large bodies, entrenched themselves at Baliari, and, sallying out, plundered on every side.

The Rao, in want of funds, laid hands on the wealth amassed by his favourites Muhammad Syed and Sidi Masud, and banished them both from Bhuj. Soon after this Meghji Seth of Anjar seized the palace gates, and the Rao, forced to submit, was placed under restraint (1786). Rayadhan had turned religious fanatic and tried to convert his pupils to Islam which further fuelled the revolt.

The chief actors, the Jamadars and Meghji Seth, raising Prithvirajji, Rayadhan's younger brother to the chiefship, appointed during his minority a council known as the Bar Bhayat ni Jamat (twelve brothers) with Meghji Seth and Dosal Ven as its leading members. Jamat ruled the state under Fateh Muhammad from 1786 to 1801 who stabilized the state. Fateh Muhammad retired to Anjar in 1801 when Pritvirajji came of age and took over the administration.

=== Second reign (1801–1813) ===
After death of his brother Prithvirajji, Rayadhan insisted on resuming his authority. He tried to kill minister Hansraj, who saved his life by a speedy retreat to Mandvi. Rayadhan was at last independent. But he had no funds, and before long, was forced to call Hansraj to his help. Hansraj came, and succeeding in placing Rayadhan under restraint, carried on the government at Bhuj. About this time (1802), he offered to cede Kutch to the British Government on condition that they would grant a maintenance to Rao Rayadhan and his relations.

Meanwhile, Fateh Muhammad, remaining quiet at Anjar, busied himself in extending its trade and establishing a harbour at Tuna. In these schemes and in keeping up a large body of mercenaries he spent more than his income, and looking about for some way to raise money, made so heavy a demand from his follower Askarn, that he, entering into secret communication with Hansraj, invited him to attack Anjar, and flying from the town joined his troops. They advanced together against Anjar; but after remaining some days before the town, were forced to return to Bhuj. Shortly afterwards, at Bhuj, Askarn taking advantage of Hansraj's absence, on condition of a promise of the post of minister, set Rao Rayadhan free. But none of the districts would admit Askarn's authority or pay him revenue, and failing in another attack on Anjar he had again to fly to Bhuj. The people rose against him due to his extractions, and the Rao, hearing their complaints, ordered him to be seized and put to death. Askarn saved his life by taking shelter in Muhammad Pana's mosque and afterwards escaped with only two horsemen. Fateh Muhammad, after his victory over Askarn, continued to advance on Bhuj, and, finding the mercenaries friendly, he was at night secretly admitted into the town. His troops had scarcely entered when they were attacked by Rayadhan, who had always a strong dislike to Fateh Muhammad, and was now determined to dispute his possession of Bhuj. Rao Rayadhan was wounded in the fight. Fateh Muhammad again took over in 1804 and administered the state under Jamat until his death on 5 October 1813.

When Fateh Muhammad died, Rayadhan again ruled for less than a month and he sickened with fever and died on 30 October. Though he wanted to be buried by Muslim customs, his family cremated his body as Hindu customs.

== Political Office ==
Rayadhan III Jadeja Dynasty Born: 1763 Died: 1813
Regnal titles
Preceded by Godji II	Maharaja of Kutch; 1778 – 1786	Succeeded by Prithvirajji
Preceded by Prithvirajji	Maharaja of Kutch; 1801 – 1804	Succeeded by Bar Bhayat ni Jamat
Preceded by Bar Bhayat ni Jamat	Titular Maharaja of Kutch under Jamat; 1804 − 5 October 1813	Succeeded by Bar Bhayat ni Jamat
