= Lakhpat =

- Town
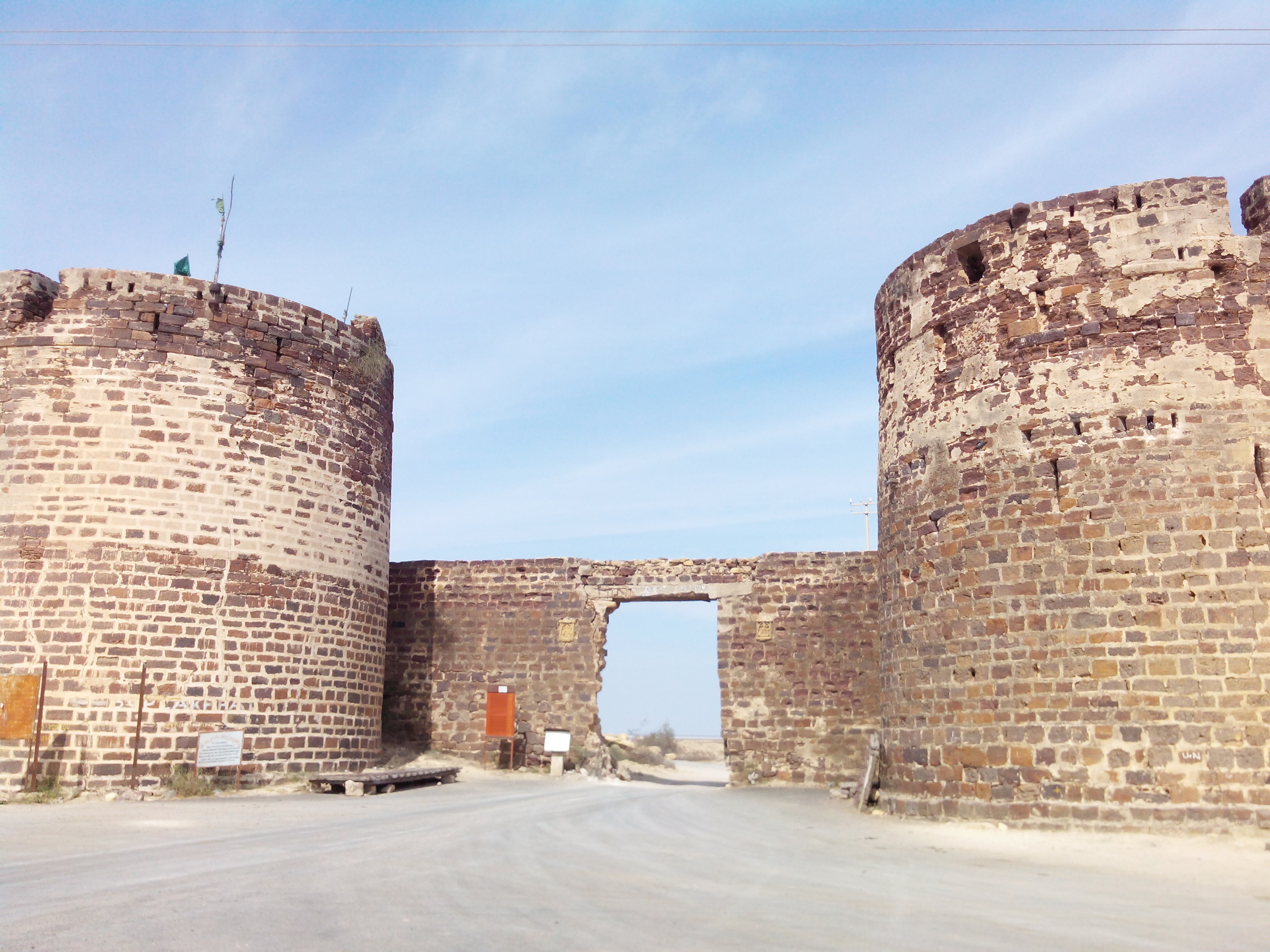
- Lakhpat fort gate

- Location in Gujarat, India Lakhpat (India)
- Coordinates: 23.82°N 68.77°E
- Country: India
- State: Gujarat
- District: Kachchh
- Elevation: 89 m (292 ft)

Population (2011)
  - Total: 807

Languages
  - Official: Kutchi, Gujarati, Hindi
- Time zone: UTC+5:30 (IST)
- Telephone code: 02839
- Vehicle registration: GJ-12
- Coastline: 10 kilometres (6.2 mi)
- Nearest Town: Nakhatrana
- Lok Sabha constituency: Bhuj
- Climate: Dry (Köppen)
- Avg. summer temperature: 42 °C (108 °F)
- Avg. winter temperature: 20 °C (68 °F)
- Website: gujaratindia.com

Lakhpat is a town in Kachchh district in the Indian state of Gujarat located at the mouth of the Kori Creek. The town is enclosed by 7km-long, 18th century fort walls.

== Etymology ==
The town is named after Rao Lakha who ruled in Sindh (a place near the kutcch area) about in the middle of the thirteenth century.

== History ==
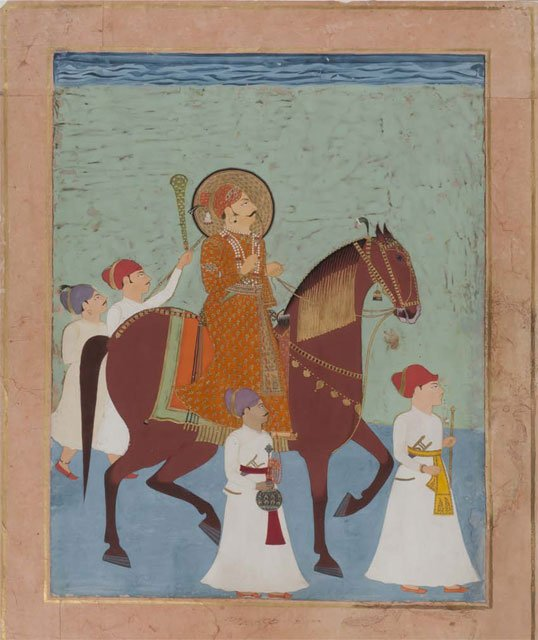
Ceremonial Horseback Portrait of Prince Lakhpatji of Kutch with Four Attendants. Kutch or Nagaur, c.1750

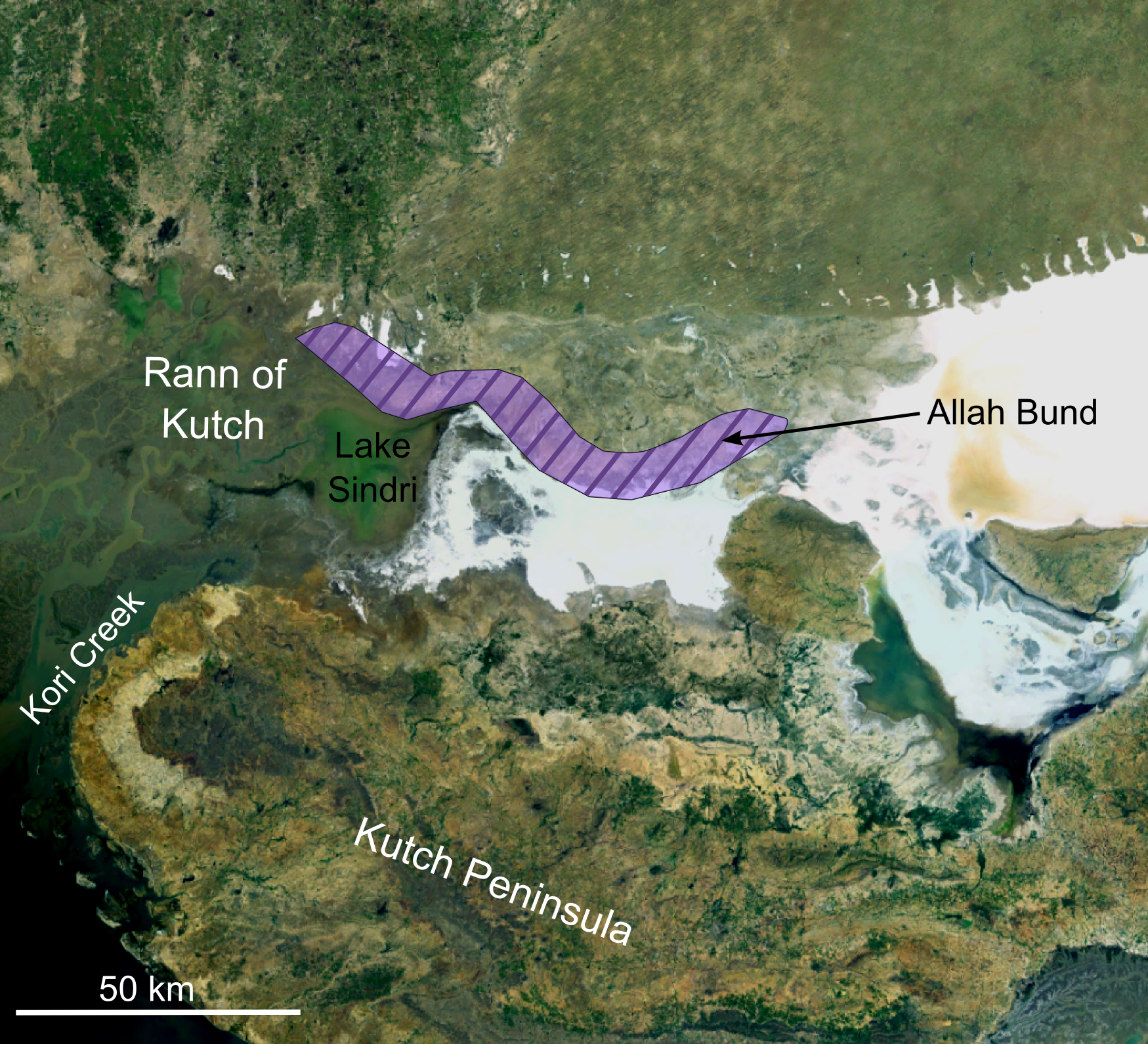
Kachchh Area

Historically Lakhpat has been a very important trading post connecting Gujarat to Sindh. The waters of the Sindhu River used to flow into Lakhpat and further on to Desalpar Gunthli. In historic times, Lakhpat had only one very short period of prosperity. Rice used to be cultivated there, which was the source of 800,000 Koris in annual revenue. It is also said that Lakhpat used to generate an income of 100,000 Koris everyday from maritime activities. Fateh Muhammad, about the close of the eighteenth century (1801), enlarged and rebuilt its wall, and for a time it was a center of trade in Sindh. Though he thought it one of the chief supports of his power, Lakhpat declared against Fateh Muhammad when he opposed the Rao of Cutch State in 1804. A few years later (1809), the commandant of the fort, Mohim Miyan, drove out the agents of Hansraj and governed the town on his own account. In 1818, Lakhpat had 15,000 people and yielded a yearly revenue of £6000 (₹ 60,000). After the earthquake of 1819, a natural dam known as the Allahbund was formed, and the Indus River changed its course of flow and started flowing into the Arabian Sea further north. Thus Lakhpat lost its importance as a port. By 1820, the population reduced to 6000 inhabitants, consisting chiefly of mercantile speculators from other countries and families of Hindus that migrated from the Sindh province. The walls were in good repair, but the houses were ruined and did not fill one-third of the area. By 1851, all trade had left the town, and it has since remained poverty-stricken and half deserted. The population reduced to 2500 by 1880.

Today it is a sparsely populated ghost town, a city of ruins of buildings and a historic fort surrounding them. The population was 463 in 87 households in 2001 which increased to 566 residents in 108 households by 2011. But as of the sub district (Lakhpat taluka) the population is about 62550

== Places of interest ==
=== Fort ===
The Lakhpat Fort, rebuilt and expanded in 1801 by Fateh Muhammad, is an irregular polygon, defended by round towers and built of hard brown stone. The 7km-long walls are of considerable height but not thick.

=== Pir Ghaus Muhammad tomb inside the Lakhpat Fort ===
Pir Ghaus Muhammad, a Sufi saint and Syyed of Lakhpat, half-Muslim and half-Hindu in his customs, who was believed to have supernatural power. Dying in 1855, his brother Bava Mia or Sa Saheb, from contributions made by Gosh Muhammad's followers, began to build a tomb locally known as Kubo. This tomb, of black stone, on a platform fifty-four feet square and seven high, rising in a conical dome 63 feet 3 inches high, is octagonal in shape, with four side doors arched and richly carved, and the walls decorated with patterns of flowers and leaves. Inside, the floor is paved with white and black marble, and the grave is covered with a white marble canopy. On the walls are passages from the Quran. It is still unfinished. The water tank opposite the tomb is believed to have healing characteristics for skin diseases.

=== Other ===
Sayyed Pir Shah Dargah has nine-domed with intricate carvings. Nani Mai Dargah, Hatkeshwar Temple amongst others in the old town are reminisces of the past.

Khatiya, a village within the borders of Lakhpat taluka, has gained international attention due to recent discovery of graves and burial artifacts related to the Indus Valley Civilisation.

== BSF Post ==
The seaward side of the fort is guarded by Border Security Force (BSF) of India soldiers as it is not far away from international border between India and Pakistan marked in salt marsh land. There are BSF guards posted on the fort's fortifications and the nearby Border Outpost.

== In popular culture ==
- The 2000 Hindi film Refugee directed by J P Dutta featured Lakhpat fort as a fictitious town located across the international border in neighboring Pakistan.

== Gallery ==
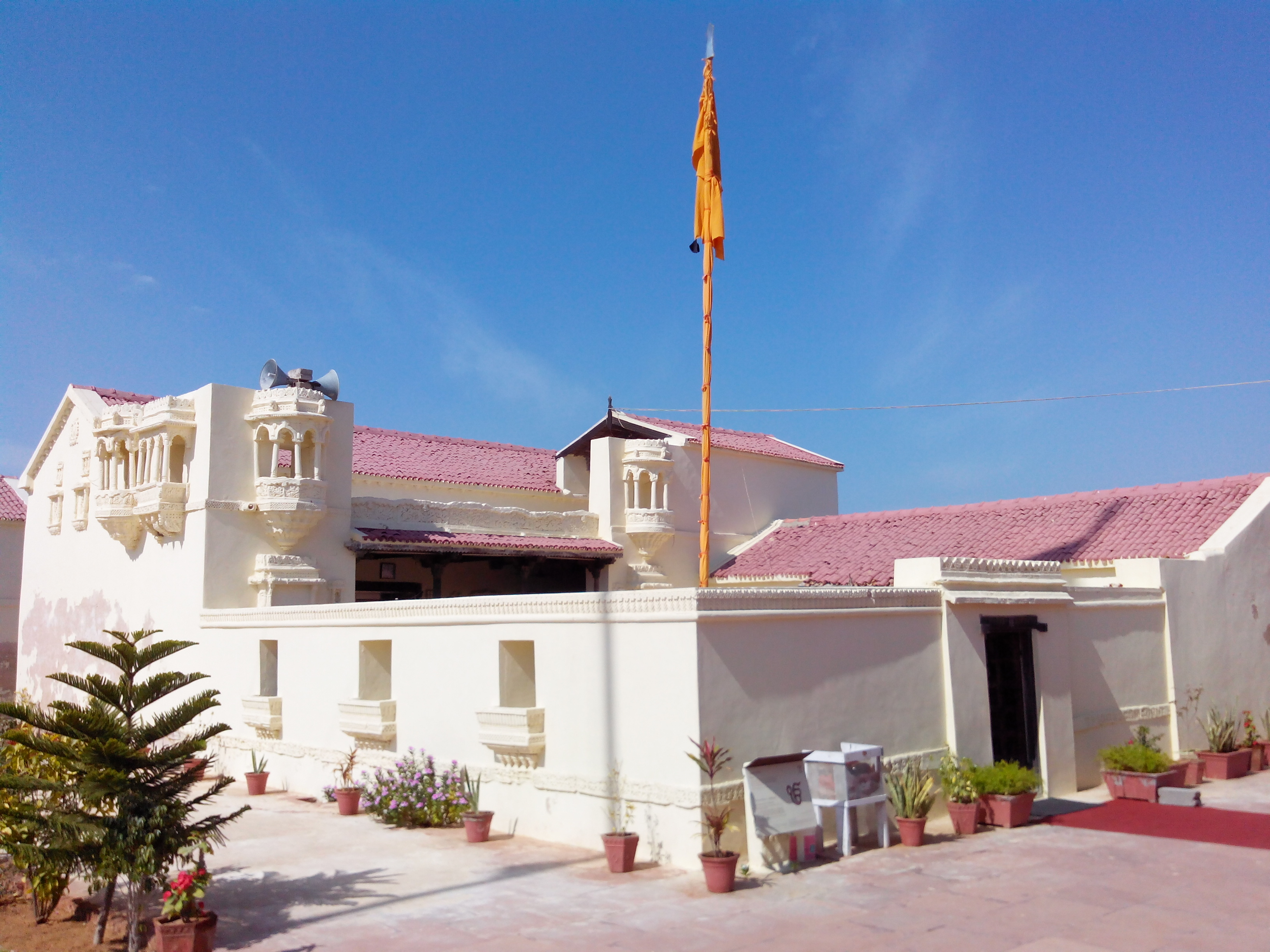
Lakhpat Gurdwara

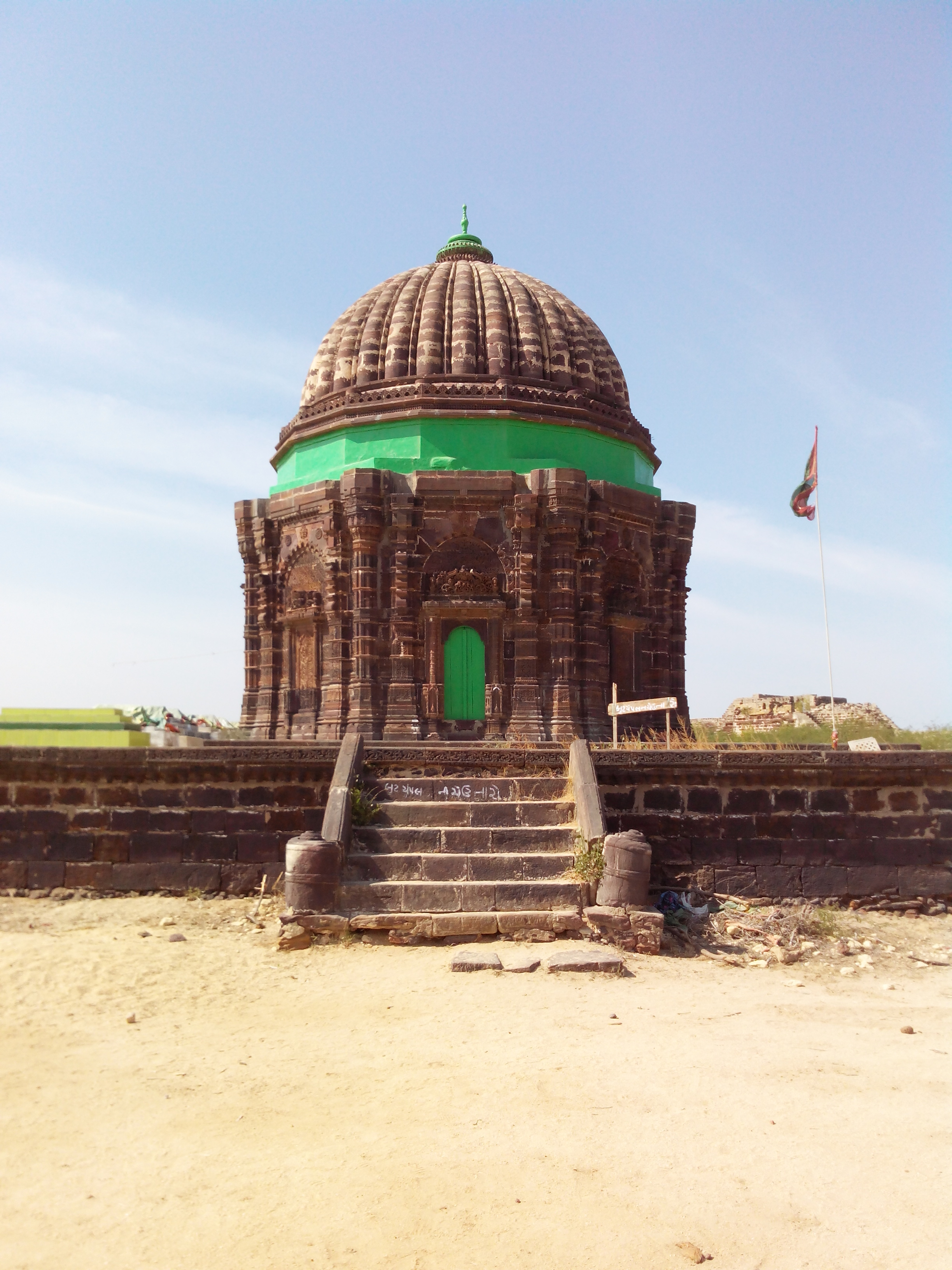
Pir Mohammed Kubo tomb at Lakhpat

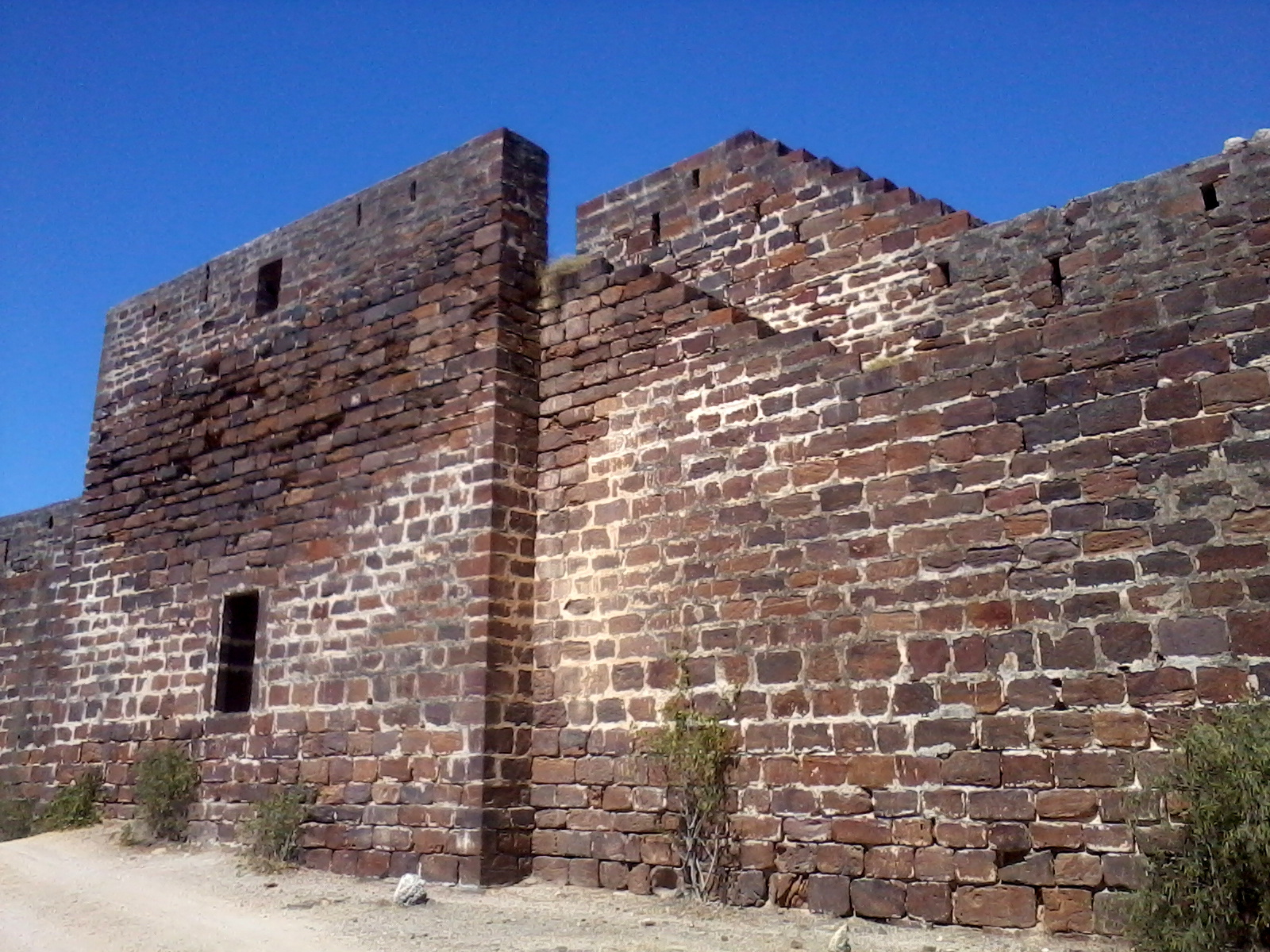
Lakhpat Fort wall

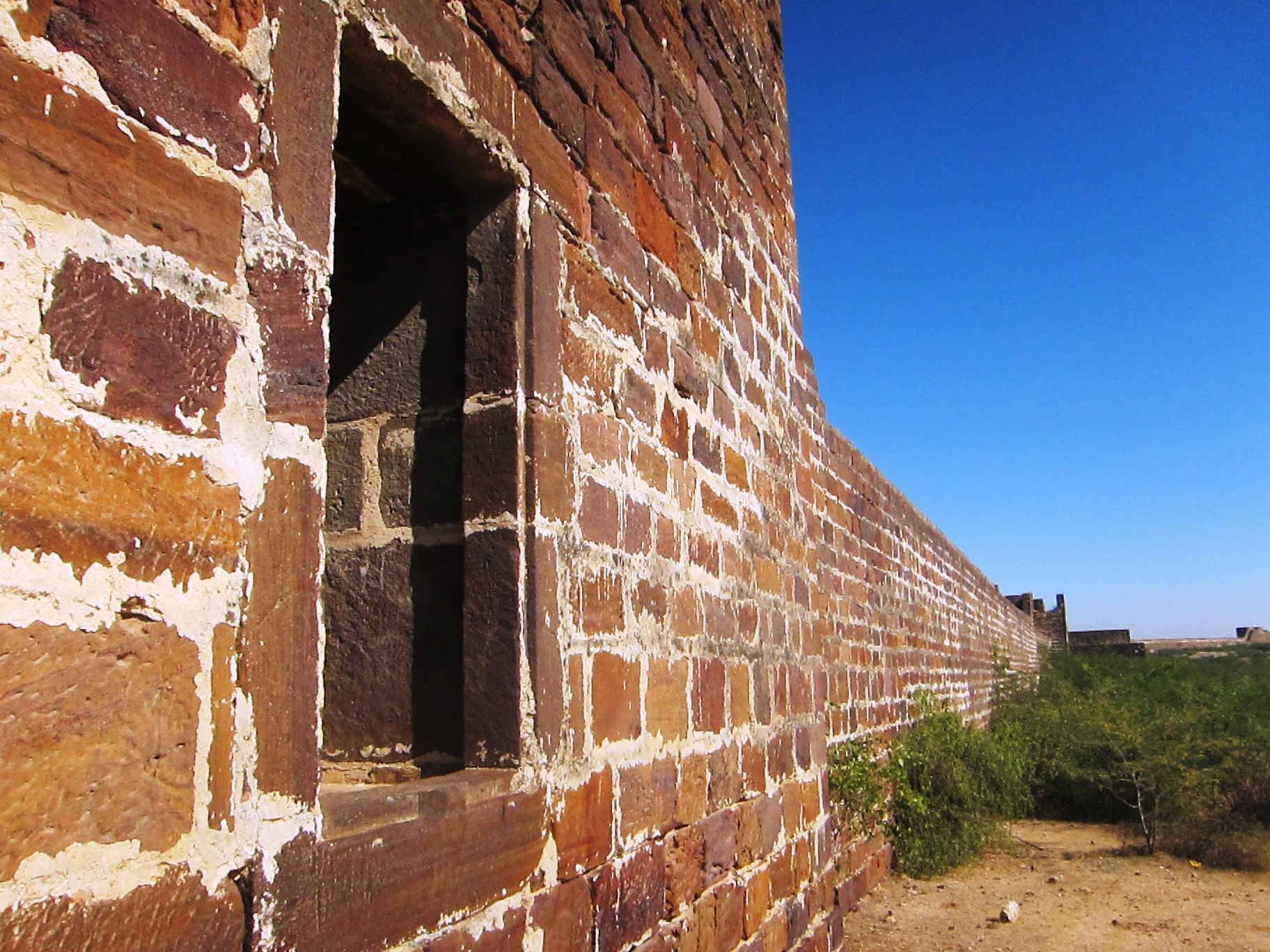
The abandoned town of Kot Lakhpat in Kutch

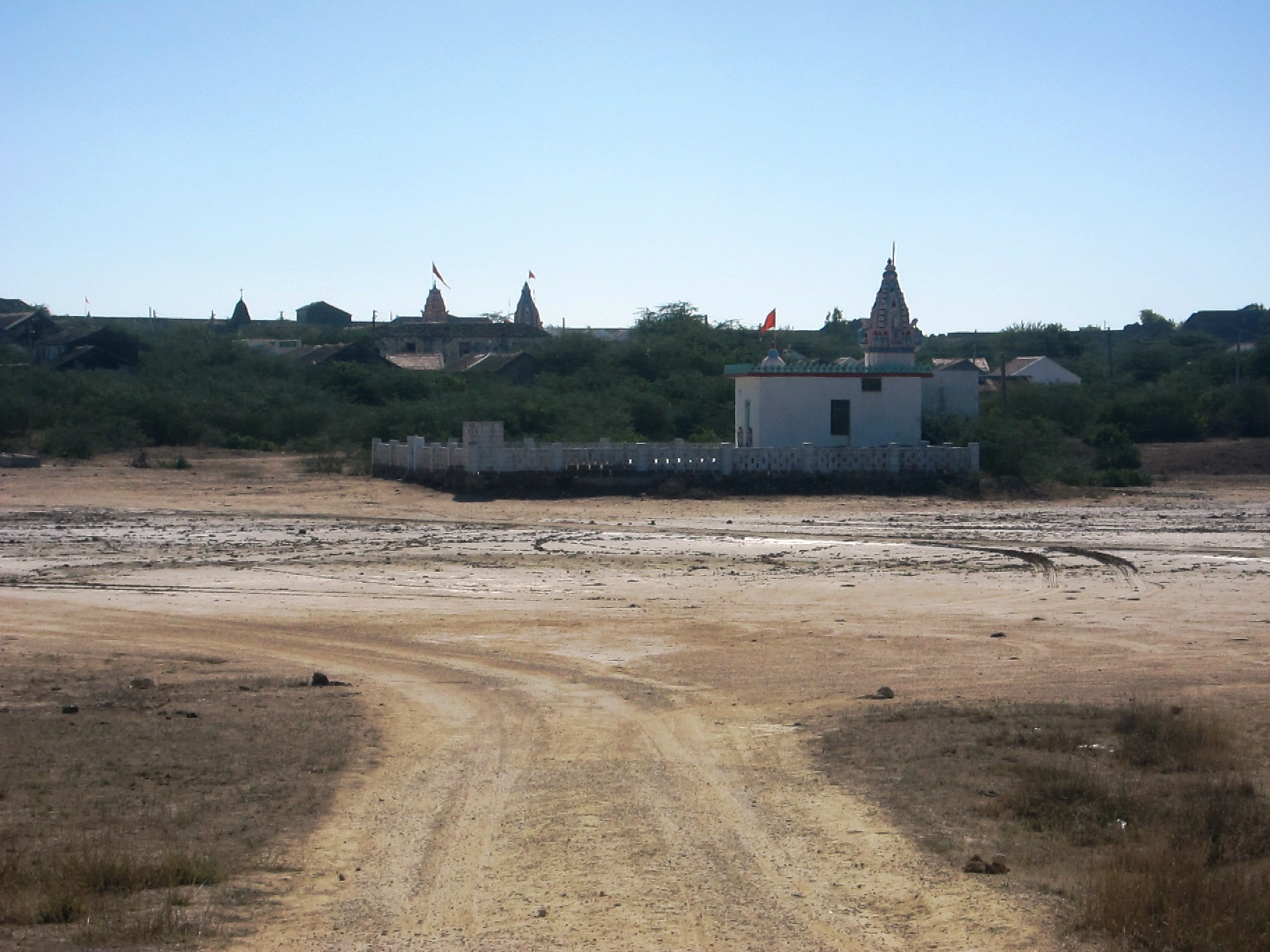
Lakhpar Village view

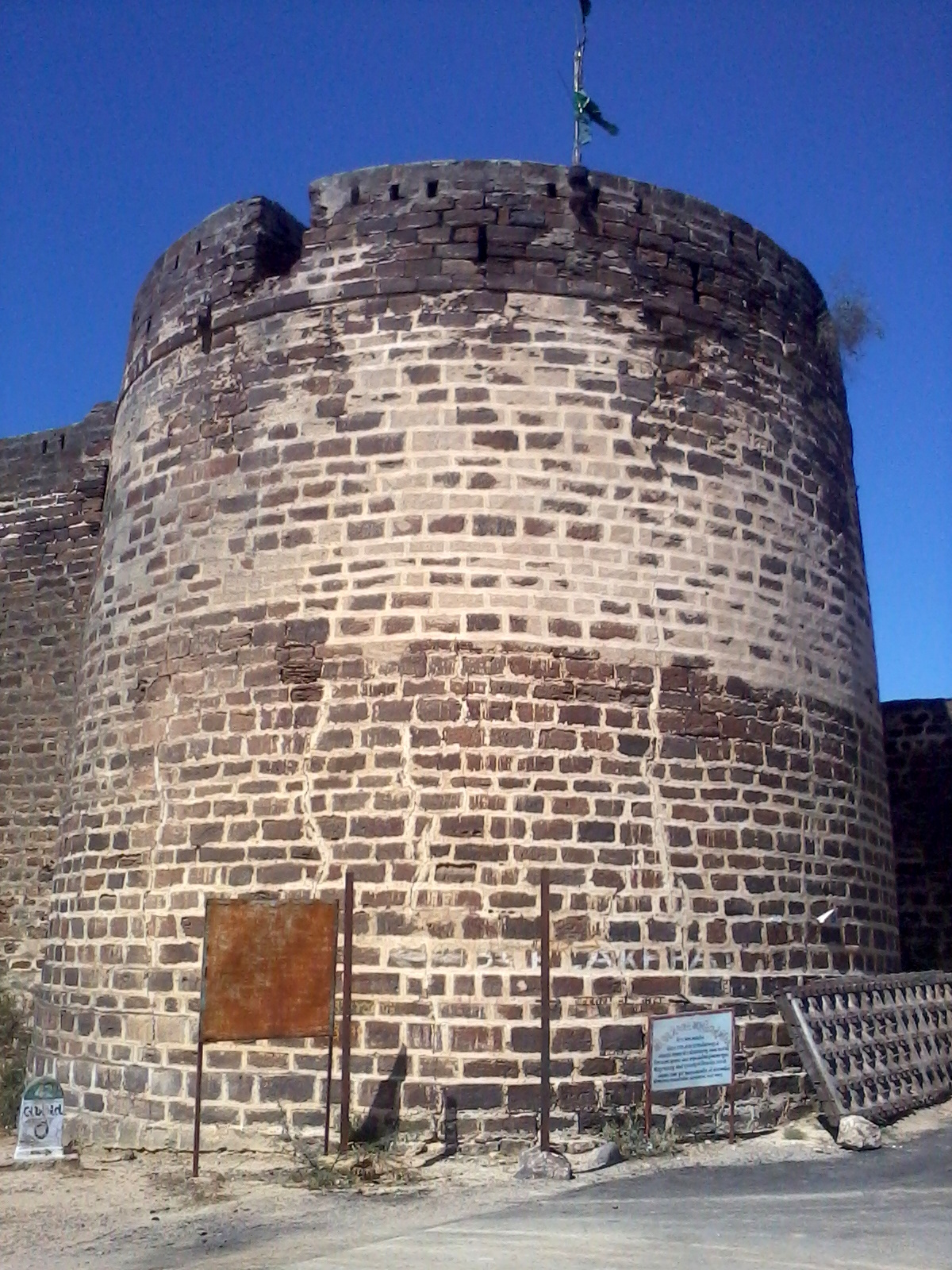
Tower to the left of the gateway

== See also ==
- Lakhpat Nagar railway station
- Lakhpatji
