= Yesubai Bhonsale =

Queen of Swarajya from 1680 to 1689)

Maharani Yesubai Bhosale
- Maharani of Maratha Kingdom

Chief Queen Consort of the Maratha Kingdom
- Tenure: 20 July 1680 – 11 March 1689
- Predecessor: Saibai; Soyarabai
- Successor: Jankibai; Tarabai

Rajmata of Maratha Empire
- Tenure: 1719 - 1730
- Predecessor: Sakvarbai
- Successor: Tarabai
- Born: Jivubai Shirke; 1658; Shringarpur, Konkan
- Died: 1730 (aged 71–72); Satara, Maharashtra
- Spouse: Sambhaji
- Issue: Bhavani Bai; Shahu I
Names
- Yesubai Sambhaji Bhonsale
- House: Shirke (by birth); Bhonsle (by marriage)
- Father: Pilajirao Shirke
- Religion: Hinduism

Maharani Yesubai Bhonsale was the wife of Chhatrapati Sambhaji Maharaj, and referred to as Maharani of the Maratha Kingdom. She was second officially crowned Queen of Swarajya. She was also mother of Chhatrapati Shahu I. Later on she became Rajmata in Chhatrapati Shahu I's reign. Chhatrapati Sambhaji had shared his power with Yesubai. When Chhatrapati Sambhaji was away from the maratha capital due to battles, all the political decisions were made by her.

== Life ==
Yesubai was born AD 1660–61. She was the daughter of Pilaji Shirkey, who the prominent chief of Shringarpur. After Shivaji defeated the Shirkey Sardars and captured Shringarpur, Shivaji's son Sambhaji married Yesubai.

After Jijabai, Yesubai was made Kulmuktyar (one who can interfere in the case of justice) of Swarajya as per custom. After the execution of Sambhaji by the Emperor Aurangzeb, she announced Rajaram as the next chhatrapati of swarajya. For nearly two decades, Yesubai and Shahu were held captive in Mughal custody. During this time, she displayed immense patience and resilience, ensuring her son's survival and preparing him for his future role. Eventually, in 1707, after Aurangzeb's death, a succession struggle within the Mughal Empire led to Shahu being released by Bahadur Shah I. This event marked the beginning of Shahu's rise to power and the expansion of the Maratha Kingdom.

== In popular culture ==
Many actresses have portrayed Yesubai's life in various films and television shows produced in India. These include:

- Zillu in Chhatrapati Sambhaji (1925)
- Prajakta Gaikwad in Swarajya Rakshak Sambhaji (2017–2020)
- Mohini Potdar in Chhatrapati Sambhaji (2024)
- Ayesha Madhukar in Shivrayancha Chhava (2024)
- Amruta Khanvilkar in Dharmarakshak Mahaveer Chhatrapati Sambhaji Maharaj: Chapter 1 (2024)
- Rashmika Mandanna in Chhaava (2025)
