= Sambhaji =

Chhatrapati of the Marathas from 1681 to 1689

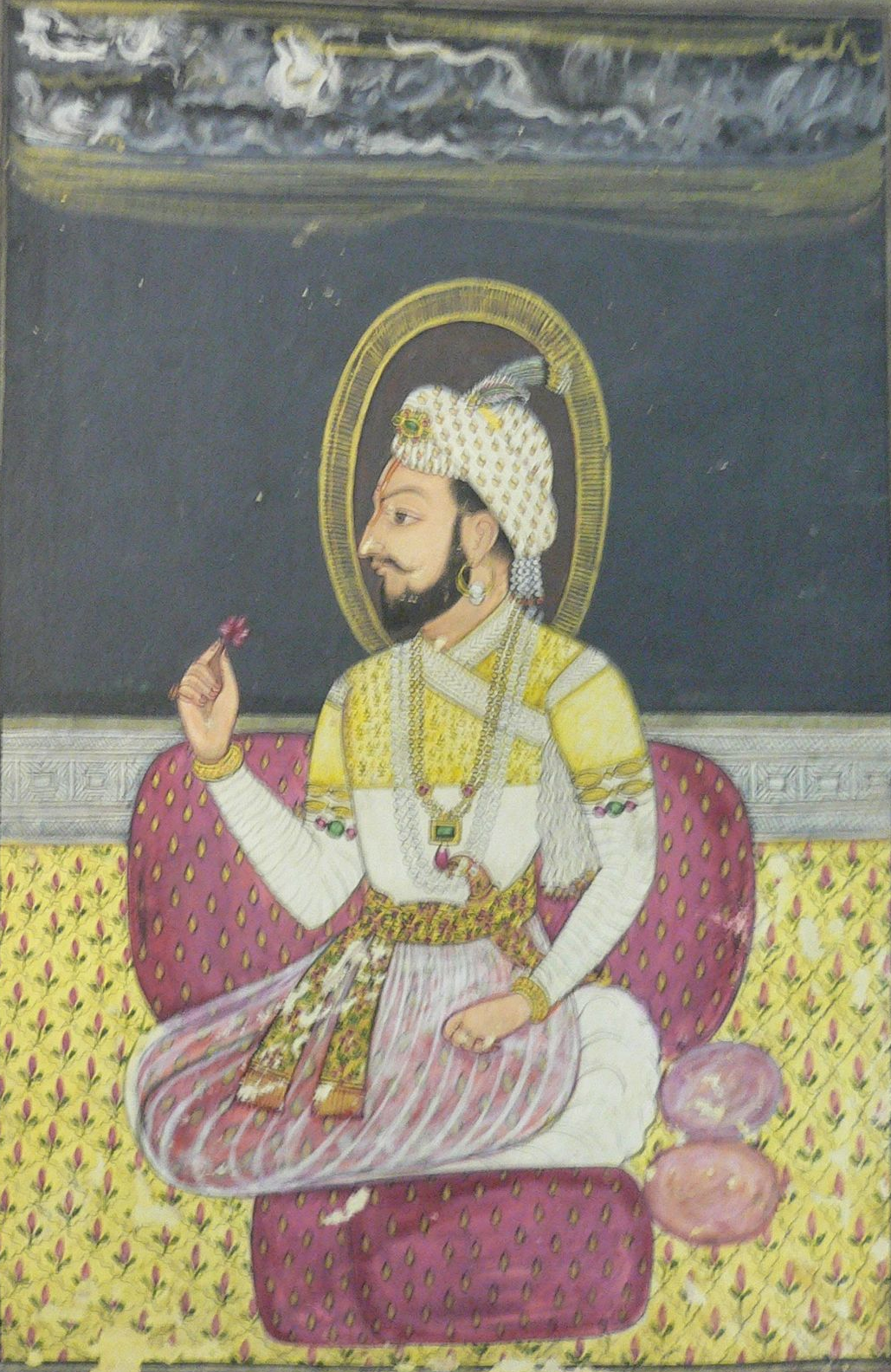
- Portrait of Sambhaji, late 17th century.

Chhatrapati of the Marathas
- Reign: 16 January 1681 – 11 March 1689
- Coronation: 20 July 1680, Panhala (symbolic); 16 January 1681, Raigad fort (official)
- Predecessor: Shivaji I
- Successor: Rajaram I
- Peshwa: Moropant Trimbak Pingale; Moreshvar Pingale; Ramchandra Pant Amatya
- Born: 14 May 1657; Purandar Fort, Ahmadnagar Subah, Mughal Empire (present-day Pune district, Maharashtra, India)
- Died: 11 March 1689 (aged 31); Tulapur, Ahmadnagar Subah, Mughal Empire (present-day Pune district, Maharashtra, India)
- Cause of death: Execution by decapitation
- Spouse: Yesubai
- Issue: Bhavani Bai; Shahu I
- House: Bhonsale
- Father: Shivaji I
- Mother: Saibai
- Religion: Hinduism

Sambhaji (Sambhajiraje Shivajiraje Bhonsle, Marathi pronunciation: [saːmˈbʱaːdʑiː ˈbʱos(ə)le]; 14 May 1657 – 11 March 1689), also known as Shambhuraje, ruled from 1681 to 1689 as the second king (Chhatrapati) of the Maratha Empire, a prominent state in early modern India. He was the eldest son of Shivaji, the founder of the Maratha Empire.

At the age of nine, Sambhaji was taken as a political hostage of the Mughal Empire, to guarantee his father's compliance with the treaty of Purandar. He later accompanied his father to Agra where both were placed under house arrest by the Mughal Emperor Aurangzeb; they subsequently escaped. He was later confined by his father at Panhala Fort, with some theories suggesting that it was due to his addiction to "sensual pleasures" or for violating a Brahmin woman. He subsequently defected to the Mughal Empire and served under Diler Khan in the Battle of Bhupalgarh against his father. He ascended the throne following his father's death, with his rule being largely shaped by the ongoing wars between the Marathas and the Mughal Empire, as well as other neighbouring powers such as the Siddi of Janjira, the Wadiyars of Mysore and the Portuguese Empire in Goa.

Early in his rule, Marathas under Sambhaji attacked and disrupted supply lines and raided into the Mughal territory, although they were unsuccessful in taking over main forts. In 1683, Sambhaji executed 24 members of influential families including top government ministers after discovering a plot to poison him. By 1685, Mughals had gradually pushed back Sambhaji's forces by taking over their strongholds. Desertions became common by the end of his reign, and he had alienated Maratha deshmukhs (land owners) by burning villages to deny supplies to the Portuguese. In 1689, he was captured by Mughal forces and executed. His brother Rajaram I succeeded him as king and continued the Mughal–Maratha Wars.

Sambhaji is viewed poorly by historians, who note that his personal problems—and war crimes committed by his soldiers—overshadowed his moderate military and administrative successes. Maratha soldiers under Sambhaji's command during his campaigns committed atrocities against civilians including massacres and mass rape. As a ruler, Sambhaji implemented drought relief measures and encouraged agricultural development while continuing his father's administrative systems. He was also a scholar who authored several works in Sanskrit and Hindustani, including the political treatise Budhbhushanam. His torture and death at the hands of the Mughal Empire elevated him to the status of a martyr. He remains popular in modern India among many Hindu nationalists.

== Early life ==
Sambhaji was born at Purandar fort to the Maratha Chhtrapati, Shivaji, and his first wife, Saibai, who died when he was two years old. He was then raised by his paternal grandmother Jijabai. At the age of nine, Sambhaji was sent to live with Raja Jai Singh I of Amber as a political hostage to ensure compliance with the Treaty of Purandar that Shivaji had signed with the Mughals on 11 June 1665. As a result of the treaty, Sambhaji became a Mughal mansabdar. He and his father Shivaji attended the Mughal emperor Aurangzeb's court at Agra on 12 May 1666. Aurangzeb put both of them under house arrest but they escaped on 22 July 1666. However, the two sides reconciled and had cordial relations during the period 1666–1670.

During the period between 1666 and 1668, Aurangzeb initially refused but later officially recognized the title of Raja that Shivaji assumed, on behalf of the Mughal Empire, after being pressed by Prince Mu'azzam. Aurangzeb looked upon the friendship of Prince Muazzam and Shivaji and Sambhaji with great suspicion. By mediation of Muazzam, Sambhaji was also restored to the Mughal mansabdar rank of 5,000 cavalry. Shivaji then sent Sambhaji with general Prataprao Gujar to take service under Prince Mu'azzam who was the Mughal viceroy at Aurangabad with Diler Khan as his deputy. Sambhaji visited prince Muazzam at Aurangabad on 4 November 1667 and was then granted rights to territory in Berar on the pretext of revenue collection. After a short stay, Sambhaji returned to Rajgad while representative Maratha officers continued to stay in Aurangabad. In this period, the Marathas under Sambhaji fought alongside the Mughals under Muazzam against the Sultanate of Bijapur.

=== Marriage ===
Sambhaji was married to Jivubai in a marriage of political alliance and as per Maratha custom, she took the name Yesubai. Jivubai was the daughter of Pilaji Shirke, who had entered Shivaji's service following the defeat of Deshmukh Suryaji Surve who was his previous liege. This marriage thus gave Shivaji the access of the region of Konkan coastal belt. Yesubai had two children, daughter Bhavani Bai and then a son named Shahu I, who later became the Chhatrapati of the Maratha kingdom. According to Maasir-i-Alamgiri, daughters of Sambhaji and his brother Rajaram were married to Mughal noblemen.

=== Arrest and defection to the Mughals ===
The elder Shivaji imprisoned his son Sambhaji at Panhala Fort in 1678. Contemporary author Khafi Khan suggested that his imprisonment was for personal behavior including alleged irresponsibility and addiction to "sensual pleasures".Another theory suggests that Sambhaji was imprisoned at the Panhala because he "attempted to violate a Brahmin's wife". After Shivaji returned from his Southern campaign, he stationed Sambhaji at Sajjangad, hoping to improve the latter's attitude. Sambhaji, although he revered the Matha (Hindu monastics) and their practices, was not adept at following that disciplined routine. A liaison was already established between Sambhaji and Diler Khan, now the sole person in charge of Mughal affairs in south Dakhan. On 13 December 1678, Sambhaji escaped with his wife and rejoined Diler Khan for a year, taking with him a small retinue and leaving Sajjangad with the aim of reaching Pedgaon, the Mughal cantonment. Following this, he was made a Mughal noble with the rank of seven thousand zat and conferred with the title of Raja by Aurangzeb. He later attacked the fort of Bhupalgad, which was under Maratha control while serving the Mughals. After returning, he was put under house arrest at Panhala.

According to historian Stewart N. Gordon, Shivaji did not want Sambhaji to succeed him. To this end, he devised a proposal to partition his kingdom between his two sons, with Sambhaji receiving the newly acquired regions of Karnatak and coastal Gingee, while Raja Ram was to be given the heartlands of Maharashtra. Jadunath Sarkar states that Sambhaji, aggrieved by this, is said to have joined Diler Khan in dissent against his father following Khan's letters promising Sambhaji to reclaim his right with Mughal support if he joined him. However, Sambhaji later returned to the Maratha fold following Diler Khan's unscrupulous behavior. He further states that much of the primary historical sources regarding Sambhaji are disputable, as they were written by people hostile to him. Gajanan Mehendale considers the reason for Sambhaji's estrangement from his father to be uncertain.

== Ancestry ==
Ancestors of Sambhaji

8.Maloji
4.Shahaji
9. Uma Bai
2.Shivaji I
10.Lakhuji Jadhav
5.Jijabai
11.Mahalsabai Jadhav
1. Sambhaji
6.Mudhoji Rao Naik Nimbalkar
3.Sai Bhonsale
7.Reubai

== Accession ==
When Shivaji died in the first week of April 1680, Sambhaji was still held captive at Panhala fort. Some of the influential sardars including ministers Annaji Datto and other ministers conspired against Sambhaji, supported by Soyarabai, to prevent Sambhaji from succeeding the throne. Shivaji's widow and Sambhaji's stepmother, Soyarabai after her husband's death installed the couple's ten-year-old son, Rajaram, on the throne on 21 April 1680. Upon hearing this news, Sambhaji plotted his escape and took possession of the Panhala fort on 27 April after killing the fort commander. On 18 June, he acquired control of Raigad fort. Sambhaji formally ascended the throne on 20 July 1680. Rajaram, his wife Janki Bai and mother Soyarabai were imprisoned. Soon after Soyarabai and Annaji Datto hatched another plot against Sambhaji using the exiled Moghul prince Akbar. The prince informed Sambhaji of the plot who then executed Soyarabai, her kinsmen from the Shirke family and Annaji Datto on charges of conspiracy.

== Military expeditions and conflicts ==
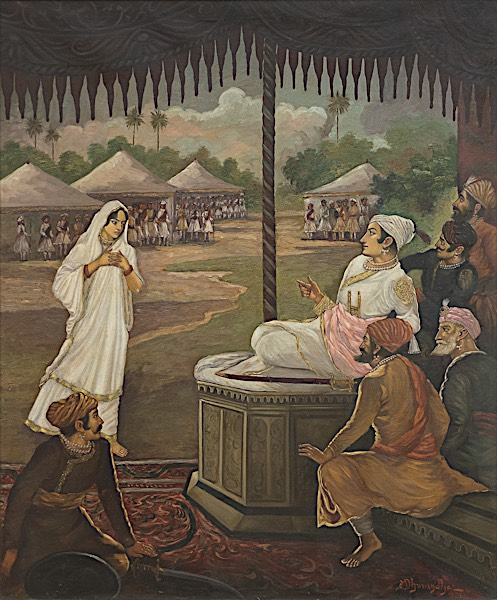
Sambhaji meeting Kubkullus at a military camp. 1921 painting by M. V. Dhurandhar

Shortly, following his accession, Sambhaji began his military campaigns against neighbouring states. Sambhaji's attack on Burhanpur, and granting refuge to prince Akbar, Aurangzeb's fugitive son compelled the latter to move south with the Mughal army.

=== Attack on Burhanpur ===
Bahadur Khan was in charge of the fort of Burhanpur who later entrusted Kakar Khan with the same. Kakar was performing the duty of collecting jizya tax from the Hindu citizens of Burhanpur. The Jizya was collected and stored at the Burhanpur fort. Sambhaji plundered and ravaged Burhanpur in 1680. His forces completely routed the Mughal garrison and punitively executed captives. The Marathas then looted the city and set its ports ablaze. Sambhaji then withdrew into Baglana, evading the forces of Mughal commander Khan Jahan Bahadur.

=== Mughal Empire ===
In 1681, Aurangzeb's fourth son Muhammad Akbar left the Mughal court along with a few Muslim Mansabdar supporters and joined Muslim rebels in the Deccan. Aurangzeb in response moved his court south to Aurangabad and took over command of the Deccan campaign. The rebels were defeated and Akbar fled south to seek refuge with Sambhaji. Sambhaji's ministers including Annaji Datto, and other ministers took this opportunity and conspired again to enthrone Rajaram again. They signed a treasonable letter against Sambhaji in which they promised to join Akbar, to whom the letter was sent. Akbar gave this letter to Sambhaji. Enraged, Sambhaji executed the conspirators on charges of treason.

For five years, Akbar stayed with Sambhaji, hoping that the latter would lend him men and money to strike and seize the Mughal throne for himself. Unfortunately for Sambhaji, giving asylum to Akbar did not bear fruit. Eventually, Sambhaji helped Akbar flee to Persia. On the other hand, Aurangzeb after coming to Deccan never returned to his capital in the north.

==== Siege of Ramsej (1682) ====
In 1682, the Mughals laid siege to the Maratha fort of Ramsej, but after five months of failed attempts, including planting explosive mines and building wooden towers to gain the walls, the Mughal siege failed.

Aurangzeb tried attacking the Maratha Empire from all directions. He intended to use the Mughal numerical superiority to his advantage. Sambhaji had prepared well for the invasions and the Maratha forces promptly engaged the numerically strong Mughal army in several small battles using guerilla warfare tactics. However, Sambhaji and his generals attacked and defeated the Mughal generals whenever they got an opportunity to lure the Mughal generals into decisive battles in the Maratha stronghold territories. Sambhaji had devised a strategy of minimising the losses on his side. If there used to be an opportunity, then the Maratha army attacked decisively, however, if the Mughals were too strong in numbers then the Marathas used to retreat. This proved to be a very effective strategy as Aurangzeb's generals were not able to capture the Maratha territories for a period of three years.

==== Mughal invasions of Konkan (1684) ====
Aurangzeb then decided to attack the Maratha capital Raigad Fort directly from the North and the South directions. He made a pincer attempt to surround the Maratha Capital that led to Mughal invasions of Konkan (1684). The Mughals were badly defeated due to the Maratha strategy and the harsh climate of the region. These failures forced Aurangzeb to look away from the Maratha Empire and search for success against the Qutb Shahi dynasty and Adil Shahi dynasty. Under Sambhaji (1680–89) the Marathas ranged up and down western India.

=== Siddis of Janjira ===
The Marathas under Shivaji came into conflict with the Siddis, Muslims of Abyssinian descent settled in India, over the control of the Konkan coast. Shivaji was able to reduce their presence to the Janjira fort, a fortified island of murud. Sambhaji continued the Maratha campaign against them, while at that time the Siddis formed an alliance with the Mughals. At the start of 1682, a Maratha army later joined by Sambhaji personally, attacked the island for thirty days, doing heavy damage but failing to breach its defenses. Sambhaji then attempted a ruse, sending a party of his people to the Siddis, claiming to be defectors. They were allowed into the fort and planned to detonate the gunpowder magazine during a coming Maratha attack. However, one of the female defectors became involved with a Siddi man and he uncovered the plot, and the infiltrators were executed. The Maratha then attempted to build a stone causeway from the shore to the island, but were interrupted halfway through when the Mughal army moved to menace Raigad. Sambhaji returned to counter them and his remaining troops were unable to overcome the Janjira garrison and the Siddi fleet protecting it.

=== Portuguese and English ===
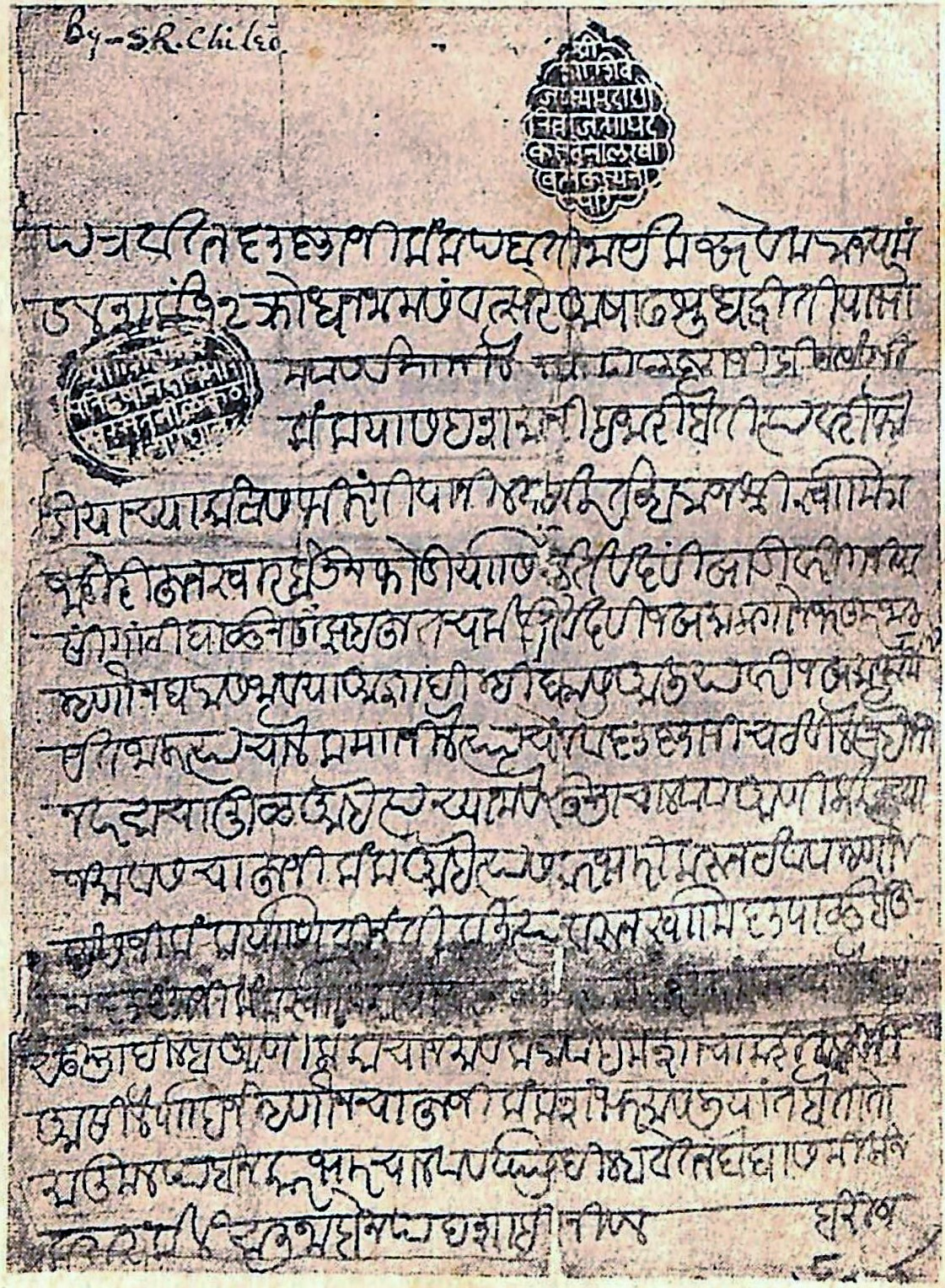
Watan Patra (grant document), by Chh. Sambhaji

Having failed to take Janjira in 1682, Sambhaji sent a commander to seize the Portuguese coastal fort of Anjadiva instead. The Marathas seized the fort, seeking to turn it into a naval base, but in April 1682 were ejected from the fort by a detachment of 200 Portuguese. This incident led to a larger conflict between the two regional powers.

The Portuguese colony of Goa at that time provided supplies to the Mughals, allowed them to use the Portuguese ports in India and pass through their territory. In order to deny this support to the Mughals, Sambhaji invaded the Portuguese territories of Bardez and Salcette with 20,000 Maratha soldiers. According to an account by Padre Francisco de Souza, Marathas looted, destroyed Churches and raped Christian women. After they had completed sacking, they carried off with themselves many men, women and children whom they later sold to Arabs and Dutch. Jadunath Sarkar notes that the Marathas were notorious for gang-raping women during invasions, including the invasion of Goa under Sambhaji. He elaborates on this by quoting a contemporary account of the event.

These enemies were so barbarous that when a woman appeared very beautiful (lit., best) to them, five or six of them violated her by lying with that woman alone, Up to now nowhere else in India has such barbarity been seen, nor even among the Kafris (Negroes). For this reason, many women of Margaon ... threw themselves into pools, where they died of drowning. Others who bravely resisted the lewd intentions of some of the enemy soldiers, were killed with strokes of the broadsword, and of some others the breasts were cut off.

The situation for the colonists became so dire that the Portuguese viceroy, Francisco de Távora, conde de Alvor went with his remaining supporters to the cathedral where the crypt of Saint Francis Xavier was kept, where they prayed for deliverance. The viceroy had the casket opened and gave the saint's body his baton, royal credentials and a letter asking the saint's support. Sambhaji's Goa campaign was checked by the arrival of the Mughal army and navy in January 1684, forcing him to withdraw. The sudden withdrawal of Sambhaji from Goa was cited as the result of a "miraculous intercession" by the saint.

Meanwhile, in 1684 Sambhaji signed a defensive treaty with the English at Bombay, realising his need for English arms and gunpowder, particularly as their lack of artillery and explosives impeded the Maratha's ability to lay siege to fortifications. Thus reinforced, Sambhaji proceeded to take Pratapgad and a series of forts along the Ghats.

=== Mysore ===
Much like his father Shivaji's Karnataka campaign, Sambhaji attempted in 1681 to invade Mysore, then a southern principality ruled by Wodeyar Chikkadevaraja. Sambhaji's large army was repelled, as had happened to Shivaji in 1675. Chikkadevraja later made treaties and rendered tribute to the Maratha kingdom during the conflicts of 1682–1686. Chikkadevraja however began to draw close to the Mughal Emperor and ceased to follow his treaties with the Marathas. In response, Sambhaji invaded Mysore in 1686, accompanied by his Brahmin friend and poet Kavi Kalash.

=== Maratha Deshmukhs ===
During his short reign, Sambhaji faced Mughal efforts to bring many Maratha Deshmukhs on their side, particularly after the demise of Bijapur and Golconda in 1686–87. Defections had become common by the end of his reign; according to Stewart Gordon, he had "badly alienated" deshmukh families by "burning villages to deny supplies to Goa" during the conflict with the Portuguese. The Deshmukh families that joined the Mughal service during Sambhaji's reign were the Mane, Shirke, Jagdale, and Yadav. There were also cases like that of the Jedhe family where one brother joined Mughal service, and the other stayed loyal to Sambhaji.

In 1683, Sambhaji learned from Prince Akbar that the faction opposing him was plotting to offer his kingdom to Akbar in exchange for his support against Sambhaji. Following this, Sambhaji tried and executed 24 members of influential families including top government ministers involved in the plot.

== Capture, torture and execution ==
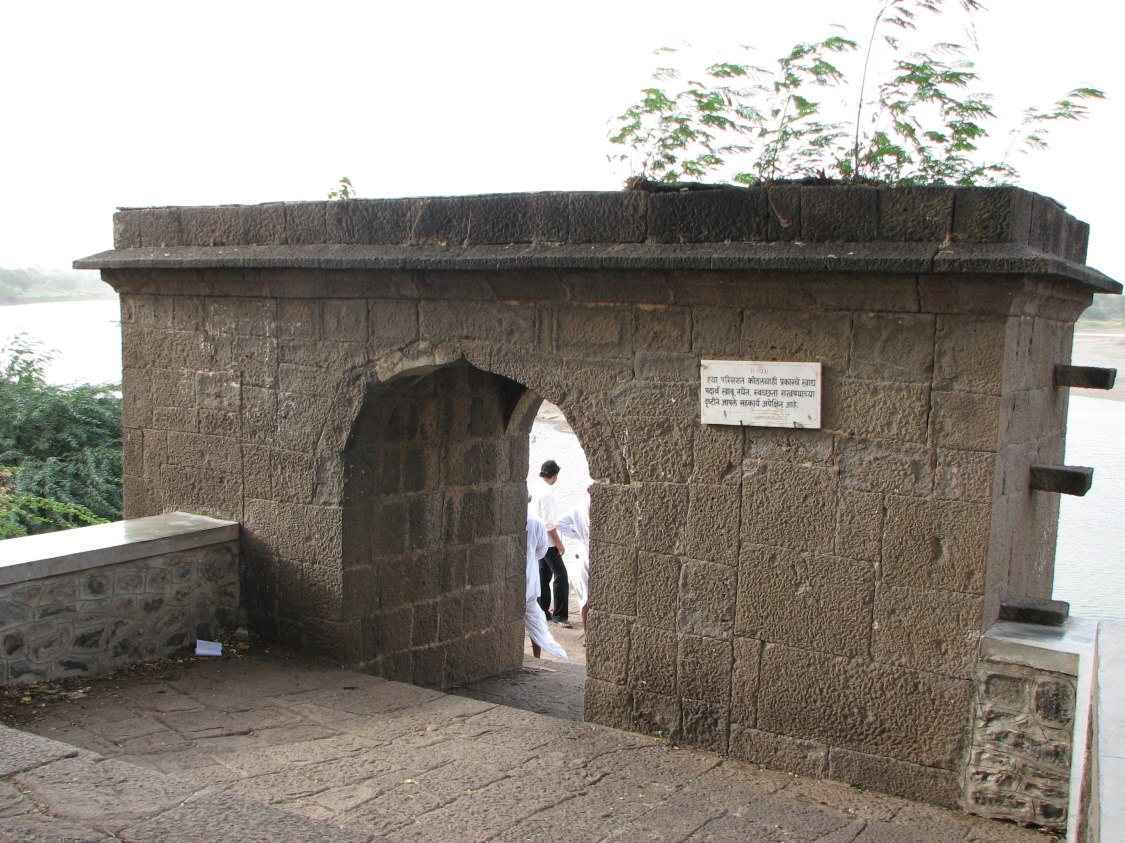
Stone arch at Tulapur confluence where Sambhaji was executed

In the 1687 Battle of Wai, the key Maratha commander Hambirrao Mohite was killed and troops began to desert the Maratha armies. Sambhaji and 25 of his advisors were captured by the Mughal forces of Muqarrab Khan in a skirmish at Sangameshwar in February 1689. Sambhaji's positions were spied upon by the Maratha officials close to him, who conveyed this information to Muqarrab Khan. Accounts of Sambhaji's confrontation with the Mughal ruler and his following torture and execution and the disposal of his body vary widely depending on the source, though all broadly agree that he was tortured and executed on the emperor's orders. The captured Sambhaji and Kavi Kalash were taken to the fort of Bahadurgad at Pedgaon in-present-day Ahmednagar district, where Aurangzeb humiliated them by parading them wearing clown's clothes and they were subjected to insults by Mughal soldiers.

Accounts vary as to the reasons for what came next: Mughal accounts state that Sambhaji was asked to surrender his forts, treasures and names of Mughal collaborators with the Marathas and that he sealed his fate by insulting both the emperor and the Islamic prophet Muhammad during interrogation and was executed for having killed Muslims. The ulema of the Mughal Empire sentenced Sambhaji to death on allegations of the atrocities his troops perpetrated against Muslims in Burhanpur, including plunder, killing, dishonour, and torture.

Aurangzeb ordered the torture and execution of Sambhaji and Kavi Kalash. According to Khafi Khan and Ishwar Das Nagar, Sambhaji and Kavi Kalash were blinded with red-hot irons first. Both were executed by beheading on 11 March 1689 at Tulapur on the banks of the Bhima river near Pune. Some accounts state that Sambhaji's body was cut into pieces and thrown into the river or that the body or portions were recaptured and cremated at the confluence of the rivers at Tulapur. Other accounts state that Sambhaji's remains were fed to the dogs.

== Succession ==
The Maratha Kingdom was put into disarray by Sambhaji's death and his younger half-brother Rajaram I assumed the throne. Rajaram shifted the Maratha capital far south to Jinji, while Maratha guerrilla fighters under Santaji Ghorpade and Dhanaji Jadhav continued to harass the Mughal army. A few days after Sambhaji's death, the capital Raigad Fort fell to the Mughals. Sambhaji's widow, Yesubai, son, Shahu and Shivaji's widow, Sakvarbai were captured; Sakvarbai died in Mughal captivity. Shahu, who was seven years of age when captured, remained prisoner of the Mughals for 18 years from February 1689 until Mughal Emperor Aurangzeb's death in 1707. Shahu was then set free by Emperor Muhammad Azam Shah, son of Aurangzeb. After his release, Shahu had to fight a brief succession war with his aunt Tarabai, Rajaram's widow who claimed the throne for her own son, Shivaji II. The Mughals kept Yesubai captive to ensure that Shahu adhered to the terms of his release. She was released in 1719 when the Marathas became strong under Shahu and Peshwa Balaji Vishwanath.

== Governance ==
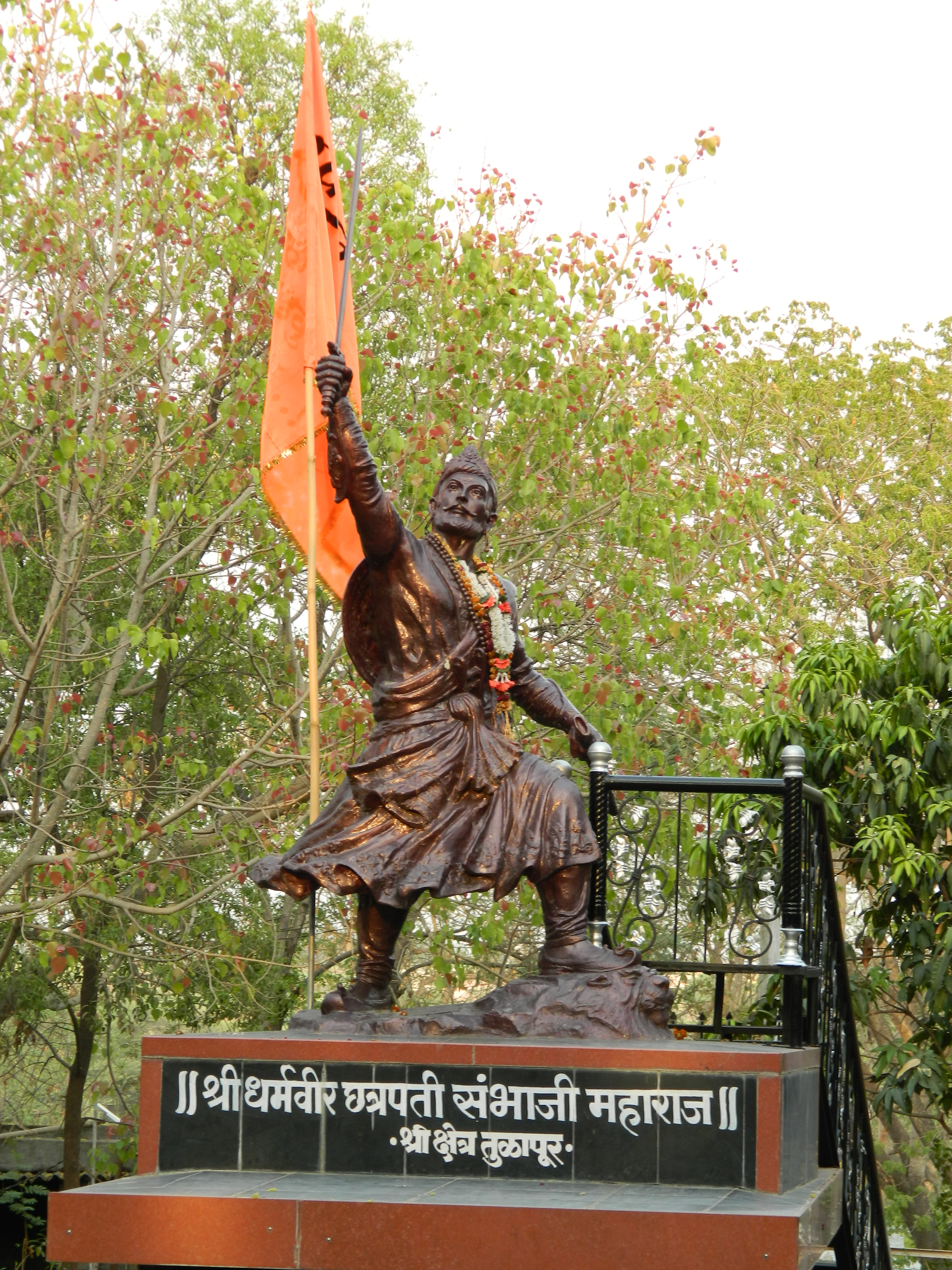
Statue of Sambhaji at Tulapur.

Sambhaji inherited the governance system created by Shivaji. He continued with most of his father's policies. The administration of the state was managed by Sambhaji with the help of Chandogamatya and the council of eight ministers. According to P. S. Joshi, Sambhaji was a good administrator who gave impartial justice to his subjects.

=== Measures against drought ===
Maharashtra witnessed severe drought during the reign of Sambhaji (1684–88). Sambhaji had to take several administrative measures to tackle the situation. Sambhaji continued Shivaji's policies by helping poor farmers. Shankar Narayan Joshi has stated that his approach against famine was very constructive and he provided solutions to many complicated problems. His policies of water storage, irrigation and developing crop patterns exhibited his progressive policies.

Sambhaji provided grain seeds, exemptions in taxes, oxen for agricultural work and agricultural tools to the farmers in the drought situation. All these measures were implemented sincerely during the drought period.

=== Agriculture ===
Sambhaji encouraged agricultural activity in the Maratha state. Agriculture was the backbone of the rural Maratha economy. He encouraged people to cultivate more land. The government of Sambhaji gave promises of safety to the Marathas who gained independence from the Mughals and asked them to carry out their previous work of cultivation in their territories. It also called back people who had absconded because of their inability to pay taxes and asked them to carry on their previous work of cultivation. Sambhaji tried to increase the revenue from agricultural activities. He also made efforts to cultivate more wasted or barren lands.

Sambhaji, in his letter of 3 June 1684, directed his prime minister Nilkantha Moreshwar to bring the agricultural land of the villages confiscated by the government under cultivation which otherwise would have remained uncultivated. He also asked Hari Shivdev to distribute fifty khandis of grain which were being sent to him from Sagargad among the cultivators.

=== Religious policy ===
Sambhaji, his ministers and officers took keen interest in supporting the cultural and religious activity in the state. They honoured and encouraged learning by granting land, grains and money to scholars.

== Education and writings ==
Sambhaji was sophisticated, educated and well-versed in Sanskrit and Hindustani in addition to Marathi. Keshav Pandit, alias Keshav Bhatta of Shringarpur, was employed for his education; an erudite scholar, he composed Dandaniti on Maratha jurisprudence and later wrote a Sanskrit biography of Sanskrit biography of Sambhaji's brother and successor Rajaram, Rajaram Charitam. In addition to law, he appears to have made Sambhaji familiar with much scholarship in Sanskrit.

Sambhaji composed several books during his lifetime, notably Budhbhushanam in Sanskrit and Nayikabhed, Saatsatak and Nakhshikha in Hindustani. In Budhbhushanam, Sambhaji wrote poetry on politics, including dos and don'ts for a king and military tactics. The first few shlokas are praises for his grandfather Shahaji, whom he considers to be an incarnation of Indra, and his father Shivaji, whom he considers to be an incarnation of Vishnu.

== Legacy ==
During his life, Sambhaji was unable to accomplish much for his people. However, his death elevated him to the status of a martyr. Sambhaji has been considered a dharmaveer (lit. protector of dharma) for his role in shepherding the young Maratha empire, although not all commentators agree on the designation, which implies a religious aspect to his life and governance. Many statues of Sambhaji exist in India. Sambhaji is viewed positively by the modern Indian Hindu movement, as he is seen as emblematic of Hindavi Swarajya (Hindu self-rule). However, Hindu nationalist icons such as V. D. Savarkar and M. S. Golwalkar had a negative view of Sambhaji. Savarkar found Sambhaji to be "unfit to rule over the Maratha empire".

The Hindu assesses that "Sambhaji's fealty to the Hindu dharma in the face of certain death has earned him much admiration from Hindu nationalists. Some early Marathi writers, however, portrayed him as irresponsible and wayward. Yet others have held him up as a figure of unwavering valiance who inspired the Marathas in their fight against the Mughals."

== Historiography ==
Early historians had an overwhelmingly negative view of Sambhaji. The first author to write an extensive history of the Marathas was James Grant Duff, whose 1826 work painted Sambhaji as a debauched and unfit ruler. Mahadev Govind Ranade, writing around 1900, came to a similar conclusion, writing that "It is useless to enter into a detailed account of Sambhaji's reign, for Sambhaji never can be said to have ruled the country."

Govind Sakharam Sardesai's 1946 work the New History of Marathas is the first modern treatment of Sambhaji's life. Sardesai's chapter on Sambhaji is entitled "Sambhaji the violent." Sardesai describes Sambhaji both as a heroic leader in the war against the Mughals and "brave as a lion personally," but also as having "vicious and intemperate habits." Sardesai also assesses that Sambhaji lacked his father's patience or foresight. Sardesai assesses that Sambhaji's aborted attack against the Portuguese at Goa marked a turning point for Sambhaji's fortunes, after which the Marathas were increasingly on the defensive. Sardesai concludes that whatever Sambhaji's strategic failings, which saw him abandoned by most of his allies, the nature of his death steeled the Maratha to avenge the death of their sovereign.

== Biographies ==
Kavindra Paramanand Govind Newaskar of Poladpur composed Anupurana, a partially-completed Sanskrit biography on the life of Sambhaji up to the birth of Shahu I, as a sequel to his father's Sanskrit biography Shivabharata. Hari Kavi, also known as Bhanubhatta, composed Haihayendra Charitra as well as its commentary, Shambu Vilasika on the orders of Sambhaji. Hari Kavi also authored Subhashitaharavalli and composed the Sanskrit biography Shambhuraja Charitra on Sambhaji's life and romance in 1684.

== In fiction ==
Films, plays and television shows based on Sambhaji's life
Year	Title	Studio(s)	Director	Characters	
Year	Title	Studio(s)	Director	Sambhaji	Yesubai
1925	Chhatrapati Sambhaji	United Pictures Syndicate	N.D. sarpotdar	Parshwanath Altekar	Zillu
1934	Chhatrapati Sambhaji	Saraswati Cinestone	Parshwanath Altekar	Master Vithal	Vijayadevi
1962	Raygadala Jevha Jaag Yete (Marathi play)			Kashinath Ghanekar	
2017–2020	Swarajyarakshak Sambhaji	Jagadamb Creations	Vivek Deshpande; Kartik Rajaram Kendhe	Amol Kolhe	Prajakta Gaikwad
2024	Chhatrapati Sambhaji	Perfect Plus Entertainment; FIF Production; AJ Media Corp.	Rakesh Subesingh Dulgaj	Shashank Udapurkar	Mohini Potdar
2024	Shivrayancha Chhava	Malhar Picture Company; Everest Entertainment	Digpal Lanjekar	Bhushan Patil	Trupti Toradmal
2024	Dharmarakshak Mahaveer Chhatrapati Sambhaji Maharaj: Chapter 1	Urvita Productions	Tushar Shelar	Thakur Anoop Singh	Amruta Khanvilkar
2025	Chhaava	Maddock Films	Laxman Utekar	Vicky Kaushal	Rashmika Mandanna

== See also ==
- Bhosale family ancestry
- Maratha clan system
- Marathi people

Sambhaji House of Bhonsle Born: 14 May 1657 Died: 11 March 1689
Regnal titles
Preceded by Shivaji	Chhatrapati of Maratha Empire; 16 January 1681 – 11 March 1689	Succeeded by Rajaram I
