= Tarabai =

Regent of the Maratha Empire from 1700 to 1708

- Regent of the Maratha Kingdom; Maharani of Kolhapur
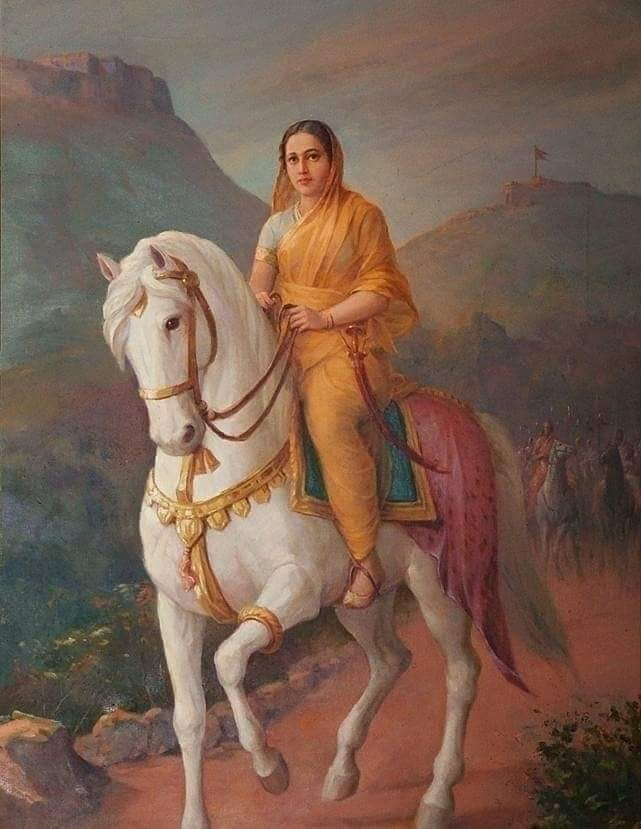
- Portrait by Baburao Painter, c. 1928

Regent of the Maratha Kingdom
- Regency: March 1700 – 12 January 1708
- Monarch: Shivaji II

Regent of Kolhapur
- Regency: 1710 – 2 August 1714
- Regent: Shivaji II

Chief Queen Consort of the Maratha Kingdom
- Tenure: 11 March 1689 – 3 March 1700
- Predecessor: Jankibai
- Successor: Sakvarbai II

Rajmata of Kolhapur
- Reign: 1709 - 1714
- Predecessor: Position established
- Successor: Rajasbai

Rajmata of Maratha Empire
- Reign: 1730 - 1761
- Predecessor: Yesubai
- Successor: Position abolished
- Born: 1675; Satara, Maratha Kingdom (Present day Maharashtra, India)
- Died: 9 December 1761 (aged 85–86); Satara, Maratha Kingdom (present-day Maharashtra, India)
- Spouse: Rajaram (m. 1682; died 1700)
- Issue: Shivaji II
- House: Mohite (by birth); Bhonsle (by marriage)
- Father: Hambirrao Mohite
- Religion: Hinduism

Maharani Tarabai Bhonsle (Marathi: [t̪aːɾabaːi; née Mohite; 1675 – 9 December 1761) was the regent of the Maratha Empire from 1700 until 1708. She was the queen of Rajaram I, and daughter-in-law of the kingdom's founder Shivaji I. She is acclaimed for her role in keeping alive the resistance against Mughal rule in Konkan, and acting as the regent of the Maratha Kingdom during the minority of her son, Shivaji II. She defeated Mughal forces of Aurangzeb in several battles and expanded the Maratha Kingdom.

== Family and early life ==
Tarabai came from Mohite clan. She was the daughter of Hambirrao (Hansaji) Mohite, Commander-in-Chief of Chhatrapati Shivaji Maharaj, the founder of the Maratha kingdom. Hambirrao's sister Soyarabai was the queen of Shivaji and the mother of his younger son Rajaram I. Tarabai married Rajaram Raje at the age of 8 in 1682, becoming his second wife.

After the death of his half-brother and predecessor Chhatrapati Sambhaji Maharaj, Rajaram ruled the Maratha Kingdom from 1689 to 1700, when his first wife Jankibai was the queen consort. On Rajaram's death in March 1700, Tarabai proclaimed her infant son, Shivaji II (later known as Shivaji I of Kolhapur) as Rajaram's successor and herself as the regent.

== Tarabai in command ==
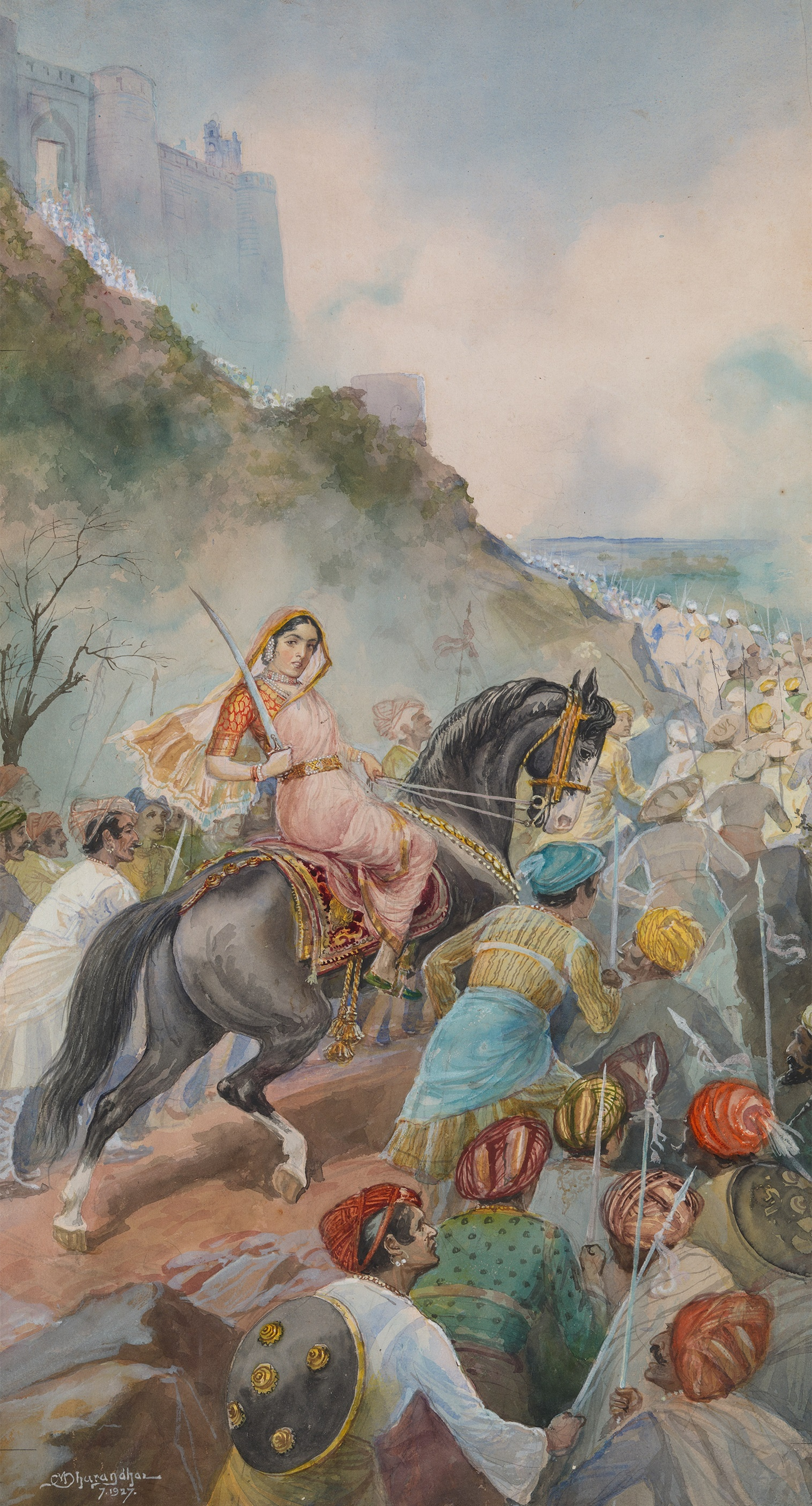
A 1927 depiction of Tarabai in battle by noted Marathi painter M. V. Dhurandhar

As the regent, Tarabai took charge of the war against the Mughal emperor Aurangzeb's forces. Tarabai was skilled in cavalry movement and made strategic movements herself during wars. She personally led the war and continued the fight against the Mughals. A truce was offered to the Mughals in such a way that the Mughal emperor promptly rejected it, and Tarabai continued the Maratha resistance.

After the Battle of Satara, Aurangzeb contested for every inch of Deccan region at great cost of life and money. Aurangzeb drove west, deep into Maratha territory notably conquering Satara (the Maratha capital) the Marathas expanded eastwards into Mughal lands of the Hyderabad province. Aurangzeb waged continuous war in the Deccan for more than two decades with no resolution and thus lost about a fifth of his army.

Signs of strain were showing in the Mughal camp in late 1701. Asad Khan, Julfikar Khan's father, counselled Aurangzeb to end the war and turn around. The expedition had already taken a giant toll, much larger than originally planned, on the empire and it looked possible that 175 years of Mughal rule might crumble due to being involved in a war that was not winnable.

By 1705, Marathas had crossed the Narmada River and made small incursions in Malwa, retreating immediately. With his 8000 men, Dabhade attacked and defeated Mahomed Khan's forces numbering almost fourteen thousand. This left the entire Gujarat coast wide open for Marathas. They immediately tightened their grip on Mughal supply chains. By 1705 end, Marathas had penetrated Mughal possession of Central India and Gujarat. Nemaji Shinde defeated the Mughals on the Malwa plateau.

In 1706, Tarabai was captured by Mughal forces for a brief period of 4 days, but she escaped after the Mughal camp - in which she was being held - was ambushed by the Marathas. The Maratha country was relieved at the news of the death of Aurangzeb, who died at Ahmadnagar and buried at Khuldabad near Aurangabad, Maharashtra in 1707 (Aurangabad was renamed as Chhatrapati Sambhajinagar in 2023).

Of the years 1700–1707, Indian historian Jadunath Sarkar, has opined: "During this period, the supreme guiding force in Maharashtra was not any minister but the dowager queen Tarabai. Her administrative genius and strength of character saved the nation in that awful crisis."

== Conflict with Shahu ==
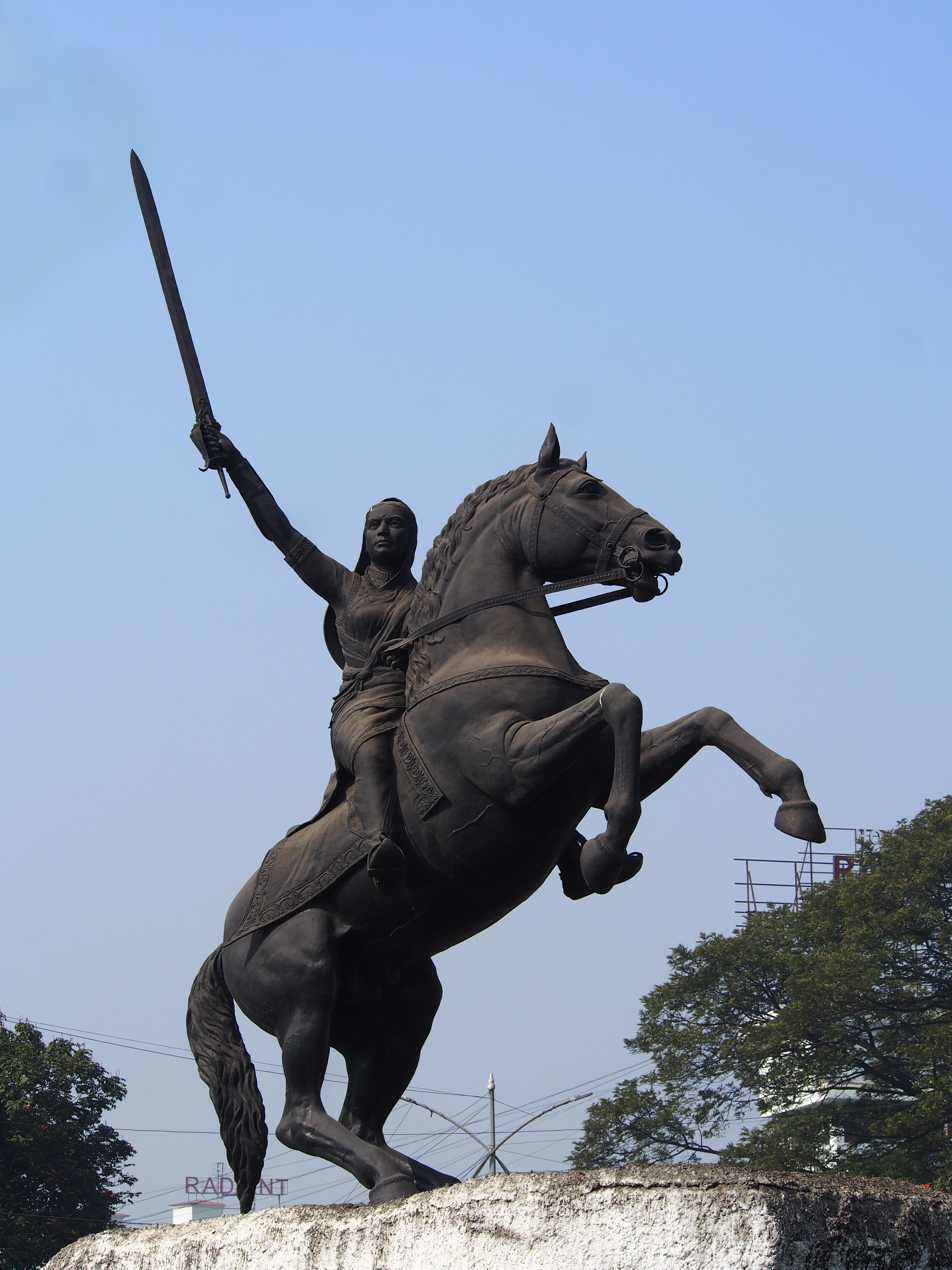
Equestrian statue of Tarabai in Kolhapur

In order to divide the Maratha forces, the son of Aurangzeb, Azam Shah on the advice of his general Zulfikar Khan released Shahu I, Sambhaji's son and Tarabai's nephew, on certain conditions. Shahu immediately challenged Tarabai and her son Shivaji II for leadership of the Maratha polity.

Tarabai at that time demanded loyalty from the Maratha generals saying that Sambhaji (Shahu's father) had lost the kingdom which Shivaji had created. Rajaram through his efforts had regained that kingdom and therefore it was not the same kingdom but a new one created by Rajaram.

Shahu eventually prevailed, sidelining Tarabai, due to his legal position and Peshwa Balaji Vishwanath's diplomacy. Tarabai established a rival court in Kolhapur in 1709, and established her son Shivaji II as the first Chhatrapati of Kolhapur, known as Shivaji I of Kolhapur. However, Shivaji I of Kolhapur was deposed in 1714 by Rajaram's other widow, Rajasabai, who put her son, Sambhaji II, on the throne. Sambhaji II imprisoned Tarabai and her son. Shivaji I of Kolhapur died in 1726. Tarabai later reconciled with Shahu I in 1730 and went to live in Satara but without any political power.

== Conflict with Peshwa Balaji Baji Rao ==
In the 1740s, during the last years of Shahu's life, Tarabai presented to the heirless Shahu I, a young man who she claimed was her grandson, and thus, a direct descendant of Shivaji. She claimed that Rajaram had been concealed after his birth for his protection and had been raised by the wife of a soldier. Shahu, who did not have a son of his own, adopted the young man who later succeeded him as Rajaram II (also known as Ramaraja).

After Shahu died in 1749, Rajaram II succeeded him as the Chhatrapati. When Balaji Baji Rao left for the Mughal frontier, Tarabai urged Rajaram II to remove him from the post of Peshwa. When Rajaram refused, she imprisoned him in a dungeon at Satara, on 24 November 1750. She also claimed that he was an impostor and she had falsely presented him as her grandson to Shahu.

In early October 1750, Tarabai had met Umabai Dabhade, who also held a grudge against the Peshwa. Umabai dispatched 15,000 troops led by Damaji Rao Gaekwad in support of Tarabai. Gaekwad defeated a 20,000-strong force led by the Peshwa loyalist Trimbakrao Purandare at Nimb, a small town north of Satara. He then marched to Satara, where he was received by Tarabai. However, Trimbakrao re-formed his army and on 15 March, attacked Gaekwad's army, which was encamped on the banks of Venna River. Gaekwad was defeated in this battle and forced to retreat with heavy losses.

Meanwhile, Balaji Baji Rao returned from the Mughal frontier, reaching Satara on 24 April. He stormed the Yavateshwar garrison in Satara, defeating Tarabai's forces. He surrounded the Satara fort and asked Tarabai to release Rajaram II, whose physical and mental condition had deteriorated considerably. Tarabai refused and Balaji Baji Rao left for Pune, since a siege of the well-provisioned and strong Satara fort would not be easy. Meanwhile, Damaji Gaekwad, Umabai Dabhade and their relatives were arrested by the Peshwa's men.

A section of Tarabai's troops in the Satara garrison unsuccessfully rebelled against her. She beheaded the rebel leader, Anandrao Jadhav. However, she realized that she would not be able to fight Balaji Baji Rao, and agreed to meet him in Pune for a peace agreement. Janoji Bhonsle, also a rival of Balaji Baji Rao, was in the neighbourhood of Pune with a strong army and agreed to protect her against any harm. In Pune, Balaji Baji Rao treated her respectfully and after some reluctance, Tarabai accepted Balaji Baji Rao's superiority. She agreed to dismiss her lieutenant Baburao Jadhav, whom Balaji Baji Rao disliked. In return, the Balaji Baji Rao forgave her. On 14 September 1752, the two took oaths at Khandoba temple in Jejuri, promising mutual peace. At this oath ceremony, Tarabai also swore that Rajaram II was not her grandson. Nevertheless, Balaji Baji Rao retained Rajaram II as the titular Chhatrapati and a powerless figurehead.

== In popular culture ==
- Raja Bhawanrao Pant Pratinidhi of Aundh State in 1927 commissioned noted Marathi artist M. V. Dhurandhar to paint a picture of Tarabai leading her troops.
- Nishigandha Wad portrayed Tarabai in the 1993 historical drama film Shivrayachi Soon Tararani, directed by Dinkar D. Patil.
- Pallavi Joshi plays the role of Tarabai in the 2017 TV series Peshwa Bajirao.
- Mruga Bodas plays the role of Tarabai in the 2017-2020 Indian historical serial Swarajyarakshak Sambhaji, based on the life of Sambhaji.
- Neena Kulkarni played the role of Tararani in the 2019 TV serial Swamini.
- Swarda Thigale played the role of Tararani in the 2021 Marathi series Swarajya Saudamini Tararani.

== Notes ==
Preceded by Rajaram Chhatrapati	Regent of the Maratha Kingdom; 1700–1708	Succeeded by Chhatrapati Shahuji
