= Swarajyarakshak Sambhaji =

2017 Indian Marathi historical TV series

- Genre: Historical Drama
- Created by: Amol Kolhe
- Based on: Chhatrapati Sambhaji Maharaj
- Written by: Pratap Gangavane
- Screenplay by: Pratp Gangavane, Latika Sawant
- Story by: Kartik Rajaram Kendhe
- Directed by: Vivek Deshpande; Kartik Rajaram Kendhe
- Starring: See below
- Country of origin: India
- Original language: Marathi
- No. of episodes: 772

Production
- Producers: Amol Kolhe; Vilas Sawant; Sonali Rao
- Camera setup: Multi-camera
- Running time: 22 minutes
- Production company: Jagadamb Creations

Original release
- Network: Zee Marathi
- Release: 24 September 2017 – 29 February 2020

Swarajyarakshak Sambhaji (transl. Self State Guard Sambhaji) is an Indian historical drama based on the life of warrior king Sambhaji. The series is directed by Vivek Deshpande and Kartik Rajaram Kendhe and is written by Pratap Gangavane. It is produced and starred by Amol Kolhe in lead role of Sambhaji, Vilas Sawant and Sonali Ghanashyam Rao under the banner of Jagadamb Creations. It premiered from 24 September 2017 by replacing Kahe Diya Pardes and aired on Zee Marathi.

== Plot ==
Sambhaji, son of Shivaji is a warrior who fights for Swarajya self rule and becomes a Maratha Chhatrapati. Sambhaji loses his mother at the age of two and grows up under the influence of his grandmother Jijabai. His battle for self-rule begins when he meets Mirza Raje and a nine-year-old. After escaping from Agra, he travels from Mathura to Raigad Fort, the Marathi capital, on his own. He is then married to Jivubai; per Maratha custom, she takes the name Yesubai.

Six or seven years later, Sambhaji becomes the prince of Swarajya. He proves himself an excellent general by defeating Kayum Khan's army in his first battle and is widely praised. Foreign powers take note of his intelligence and skills, which include writing four books in Sanskrit. After the birth of Rajaram I, family disputes begin to rise within the empire. Corrupt ministers led by Annaji Datto (who holds a grudge against Sambhaji, who has called him out for his corruption) rekindle Soyarabai's ambition to make her son Rajaram, the younger son of Shivaji, the next Chatrapati. Sambhaji's life is filled with accusations and insults. While Sambhaji is stationed at Shringarpur as the governor of Prabhanvalli, poet, warrior, and old acquaintance Kavi Kalash becomes his closest friend. Sambhaji handles the responsibility well and raises a new army of recruits in Shringarpur. When Shivaji sets out on his southern conquest, he sends Sambhaji into the Mughal camp of Diler Khan, faking a rebellion by Sambhaji. This keeps the Mughals away from Swarajya for two years, while Shivaji completes his Southern conquest. Soon after, Shivaji dies at Raigad Fort.

After the death of Shivaji, Annaji Datto Sachiv and other key ministers, supported by Rajmata Soyarabai, conspire against Sambhaji to prevent his accession. They crown the 10-year-old Rajaram without informing Sambhaji of his father's demise. However, Hambirrao Mohite (the brother of Soyrabai and uncle of Rajaram), the commander-in-chief of the Maratha army supports Sambhaji. With his help, Sambhaji captures the conspirators and takes the control of Raigad Fort. He spends a few months reforming the administration of Swarajya. He solves the problems of poor people. Sambhaji then crowns himself second Chatrapati of the Maratha Empire. At his coronation, Sambhaji pardons all the conspirators and reinstates their posts in consideration of their contribution to the Swarajya.

Mughal Emperor Aurangzeb is bent on destroying the Swarajya. Sambhaji anticipates a Mughal invasion and deals a severe blow to the Mughal Empire by plundering the rich city of Burhanpur. The audacity and military genius of Sambhaji shocks even Aurangzeb. He decides to invade the Maratha Empire immediately. He is further enraged when one of his rebel sons, Akbar, joins hands with Sambhaji. Aurangzeb, hell bent on finishing the Maratha Kingdom invades the Swarajya with a massive army of 500,000 soldiers. Sambhaji has only 60,000-70,000 men at his disposal. An unequal clash begins. Aurangzeb tries to attack the Swarajya from all directions but a skilled Sambhaji and his generals foil all his attempts through the strategy of 'Ganimi kava' (Guerrilla warfare). Aurangzeb joins hands with other enemies of the Maratha Empire such as the Siddis of Janjira, Portuguese of Goa and Chikka Devaraja of Mysore in order to Encircle the small Maratha Kingdom from all directions.

Sambhaji defeats all of these rulers in successive and brilliant campaigns. Sambhaji almost captured the fort of Janjira in his famous Siege of Janjira (1682). Later he defeats the powerful king of Mysore Chikka Devaraja a superb campaign in southern India (Maratha-Mysore War (1682)). Then he proceeds to defeat the Portuguese and almost captured the entire region of Goa in his victorious campaign of Maratha invasion of Goa (1683). Aurangzeb is frustrated, and he uses every possible trick for defeating Sambhaji but he is not able to do so. Aurangzeb's generals attack the Ramsej Fort (Siege of Ramsej) but they are not able to win the fort due to a gallant defence from the Fort's commander. Aurangzeb's generals are defeated everywhere in the Maratha region. Aurangzeb's frustration increases, so he tries to entice some of Sambhaji's relatives to join his side. Some of Sambhaji's relatives join Aurangzeb's forces. Aurangzeb attacks and finishes off Sambhaji's allies, namely the Adilshahi of Bijapur and Qutb Shahi of Golconda. Later, Aurangzeb invades the Maratha territories with renewed vigor. In a crucial battle at Wai, Sambhaji's main general Hambirrao Mohite is killed despite a Maratha Victory. After this Aurangzeb uses treachery to entice greedy maratha sardars to his side. Sambhaji loses some of his support as some sardars desert him to join Aurangzeb. Aurangzeb tries to capture the fort of Panhala through treachery but Sambhaji arrives in time and foils the attempt.

In the midst of this family issues outsiders such as Siddi, Portuguese, British; all of them became kingdom's fierce enemies. Despite that Sambhaji shows his brilliance and attacks Aurangzeb's camp to distract him. Aurangzeb is on the verge of losing the war. Finally the Mughal General Muqarrab Khan captures Sambhaji Raje and Kavi Kalash with the help of Sambhaji's brother in law Ganoji Shirke.The King who is captured by Aurangzeb is taken to Bahadurgad, where Aurangzeb humiliates them by parading them wearing clown's clothes and they were subjected to insults by Mughal soldiers. After that, Aurangzeb ordered Sambhaji Raje and Kavi Kalash to be tortured to death; the process took over a fortnight and included plucking out their eyes and tongue, pulling out their nails and removing their skin. After being brutally tortured, Sambhaji Raje was finally killed on 11 March 1689. Aurangzeb thinks that he has ended the Maratha state once and for all, however he is proved wrong. The Marathas regroup under the leadership of Rajaram I and later by Tarabai. They badly defeat the Mughals and make Aurangzeb's last years his worst years. The Mughals are defeated and the Marathas now start expanding. It wouldn't have been possible without Sambhaji.

== Cast ==
=== Main ===
- Amol Kolhe as Chhatrapati Sambhaji Maharaj
  - Divesh Medge as child Chhatrapati Sambhaji Maharaj
- Prajakta Gaikwad as Yesubai Bhonsale
  - Aabha Bodas as child Yesubai Shirke
- Shantanu Moghe as Chhatrapati Shivaji Maharaj
- Prateeksha Lonkar as Jijamata

=== Recurring ===
- Rahul Mehendale as Kavi Kalash
- Dinesh Kanande as Pant
- Anil Gavas as Sarsenapati Hambirrao Mohite
- Mahesh Kokate as Annaji Datto Sachiv
- Satish Salagare as Somaji Datto
- Nasir Khan as Balaji Chitre
- Amit Behl as Aurangzeb
- Anand Kale as Kondaji Farzand
- Poorva Gokhale as Sai Bhonsale
- Pallavi Vaidya as Putalabai
- Snehlata Tawade-Vasaikar as Soyarabai
- Sharvani Pillai as Sakvarbai
- Tanvi Kulkarni as Sagunabai Shirke
- Latika Sawant as Dharau
- Ashwini Mahangade as Ranubai Jadhav
- Pradnesh Tari as Rajaram I
- Mruga Bodas as Tarabai
- Priya Marathe as Godavari
- Nandkumar Patil as Moropant Trimbak Pingle
- Sumeet Pusavale as Harjiraje Mahadik
- Ramesh Rokade as Hiroji Farzand
- Ajay Tapkire as Bahirji Naik
- Ravindra Kulkarni as Niraji Raavji
- Vijay Andalkar as Krishnaji Jadhav
- Kishor Mahabole as Firangoji Narsale
- Swarangi Marathe as Lavangibai
- Amit Bhanushali as Muhammad Akbar (Mughal prince)
- Amruta Malwadkar as Ambikabai Mahadik
- Kaushik Kulkarni as Nilopant
- Ajay Raju as Mughal Sipahi

== Production ==
The lead actor Amol Kolhe who played the role of Sambhaji Raje won the special best actor award in Zee Marathi Utsav Natyancha Awards 2018.

=== Special episode ===
==== 1 hour ====
- 15 April 2018
- 22 July 2018
- 9 December 2018
- 19 May 2019
- 27 October 2019

==== 2 hours ====
- 24 September 2017 (Birth of Sambhaji)
- 17 December 2017 (Elder Sambhaji)

== Reception ==
=== Ratings ===
Week	Year	BARC Viewership		Ref.
Week	Year	TRP	Rank	Ref.
Week 49	2017	2.2	5	
Week 51	2017	3.1	4	
17 December 2017	2 Hours Special	2.9	5	
15 April 2018	1 Hour Special	3.7	3	
Week 19	2018	1.8	5	
Week 35	2018	3.4	5	
Week 37	2018	3.5	4	
Week 38	2018	3.2	5	
Week 40	2018	4.6	4	
Week 41	2018	5.1	2	
Week 42	2018	4.0	4	
Week 43	2018	5.6	3	
Week 44	2018	3.9	5	
Week 45	2018	3.5	4	
Week 46	2018	4.0	5	
Week 47	2018	4.1	4	
Week 48	2018	4.5	4	
Week 49	2018	4.1	4	
Week 50	2018	4.0	4	
Week 51	2018	4.9	4	
Week 52	2018	5.0	2	
Week 1	2019	4.9	4	
Week 2	2019	4.8	4	
Week 3	2019	5.6	4	
Week 4	2019	4.8	3	
Week 5	2019	4.8	3	
Week 14	2019	2.9	5	
Week 16	2019	2.7	5	
Week 17	2019	2.7	5	
Week 21	2019	3.7	3	
Week 23	2019	4.6	2	
Week 25	2019	3.3	3	
Week 26	2019	4.7	4	
Week 27	2019	4.1	3	
Week 28	2019	4.1	3	
Week 29	2019	4.1	4	
Week 30	2019	4.3	4	
Week 31	2019	5.4	3	
Week 32	2019	4.9	3	
Week 34	2019	5.4	3	
Week 35	2019	5.6	3	
Week 36	2019	4.7	3	
Week 37	2019	4.8	3	
Week 38	2019	5.5	3	
Week 39	2019	5.4	3	
Week 48	2019	4.2	1	
Week 50	2019	3.8	4	
Week 52	2019	3.0	5	
Week 53	2019	3.6	5	
Week 1	2020	2.9	5	
Week 2	2020	3.5	2	
Week 3	2020	4.3	1	
Week 4	2020	2.9	4	
Week 5	2020	3.2	4	
Week 6	2020	3.2	4	
Week 7	2020	3.9	2	
Week 8	2020	3.9	3	
Week 9	2020	5.2	1	
Week 14	2020	1.2	5	
Week 15	2020	1.0	4	
Week 18	2020	0.7	3	
Week 19	2020	0.8	3	
Week 20	2020	1.0	1	
