= Jankibai =

Janki Bai
- Maharani of the Maratha Kingdom

Queen consort of the Maratha Empire
- Tenure: March 1689 – March 1700
- Predecessor: Yesubai Bhonsale
- Successor: Tarabai
- Spouse: Rajaram I
Names
- Shrimant Akhand Soubhagyavati Jankibai RaniSaheb Bhonsale
- House: Bhosale
- Father: Prataprao Gujar
- Religion: Hinduism

Janki Bhosale (née Gujar) (1675 – 2 March 1700) was queen consort of the Maratha Kingdom as the first wife of Rajaram I. She was the daughter of Prataprao Gujar, the 3rd Senapati of the Maratha Kingdom.

Jankibai was the daughter of Prataprao Gujar, an aristocratic general, who was the commander-in-chief of the Maratha Army. Her father died in a battle against the Adil Shahi at Nesari on 24 February 1674. Shivaji, the king of the Marathas upon hearing the solemn news, grieved his general's death. As a result, he married his second son, the ten-year-old Rajaram to the five-year-old Jankibai. They were married in a grand ceremony that took place in Raigad Fort on 7 March 1680. Her father-in-law Shivaji died on 3 April 1680, twenty five days after her marriage.

== Death ==
On 2 March 1700, the thirty-year-old Rajaram died following a brief illness. Sources differ on Queen Janakibai's death. Some records say that she committed Sati with her husband at Sinhagad. However Marathi bakhars and letters reveal that Jankibai was one of the captives taken during the Battle of Raigad along with Maharani Yesubai Bhonsale and Shahuji. She was released in 1719 from the Mughal captivity by Peshwa Balaji Vishwanath along with Yesubai and other Maratha women.
