= Rajaram I =

Chhatrapati of the Marathas from 1689 to 1700

- Kshatriya Kulavantas
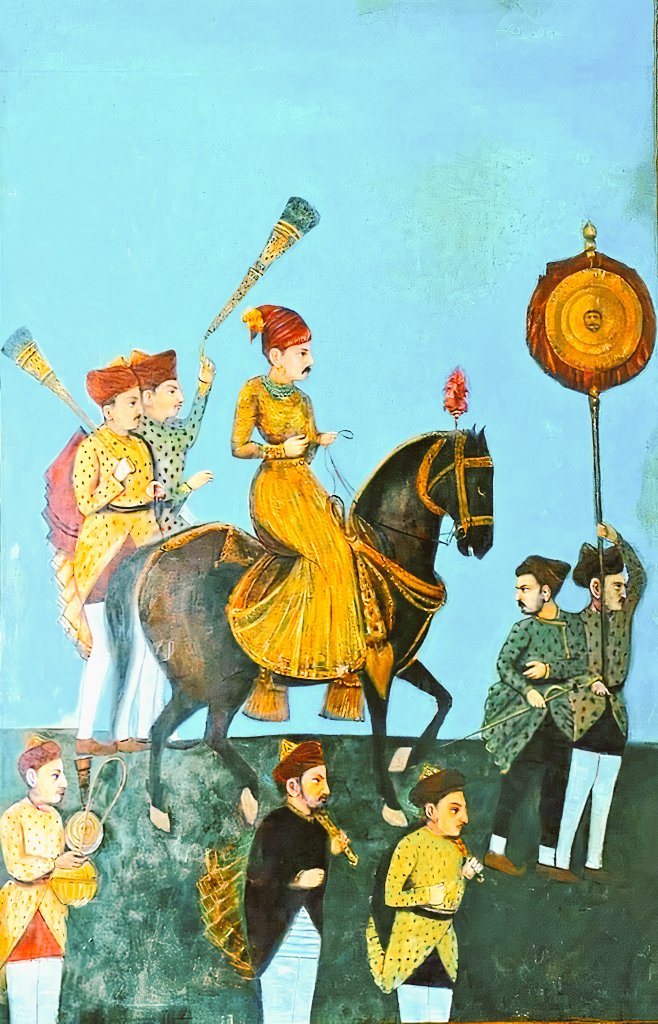
- Chhatrapati Rajaram Maharaj 1st in 1689

Chhatrapati of the Marathas
- Reign: 11 March 1689 – 3 March 1700
- Coronation: 12 February 1689
- Predecessor: Chhatrapati Sambhaji Maharaj
- Successor: Shivaji II
- Peshwa: Ramchandra Pant Amatya
- Born: 24 February 1670; Rajgad Fort, Ahmadnagar Subah, Mughal Empire (present-day Pune district, Maharashtra, India)
- Died: 3 March 1700 (aged 30); Sinhagad Fort, Maratha Kingdom (present-day Pune district, Maharashtra, India)
- Spouse: Jankibai; Tarabai; Rajasbai; Ambikabai
- Issue: Shivaji II; Sambhaji II
- House: Bhonsale
- Father: Chhatrapati Shivaji Maharaj
- Mother: Soyarabai
- Religion: Hinduism
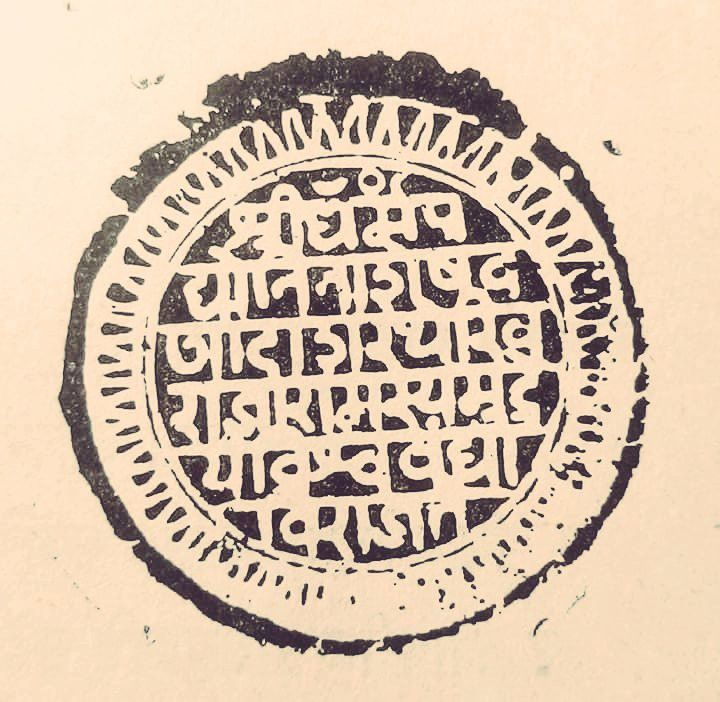
- Seal

Rajaram I (Rajaram Bhonsale, Marathi pronunciation: [[ɾaːd͡ʒaɾaːm ˈbʱos(ə)le]; 24 February 1670 – 3 March 1700), also known as Ram Raaje, was the third king (Chhatrapati) of the Maratha Kingdom, who ruled from 1689 to his death in 1700. He was the second son of Chhatrapati Shivaji Maharaj, the founder of the kingdom, and younger paternal half-brother of Chhatrapati Sambhaji Maharaj, whom he succeeded. His eleven-year reign was marked with a constant struggle against the Mughals. He was succeeded by his infant son Shivaji II under the regentship of his wife Maharani Tarabai.

== Early life and family ==
Rajaram was born in the Bhonsle dynasty to Chhatrapati Shivaji Maharaj and his second wife, Soyarabai, on 24 February 1670. He was thirteen years younger than his brother, Sambhaji. Given the ambitious nature of Soyarabai, Rajaram was installed on the Maratha throne upon the death of his father in 1680 at the age of 10. However, the Maratha generals wanted Sambhaji as the king and thus Sambhaji claimed the throne. Upon Sambhaji's death at the hands of the Mughals in 1689, Rajaram was informally crowned as Chhatrapati of as a regent for his nephew Shahu I. He vowed to avenge his brother's execution.

Rajaram married three times. His first marriage was at the age of ten to Jankibai, the five -year-old daughter of Shivaji's army chief, Prataprao Gujar. His other wives were Tarabai, the daughter of Sarsenapati Hambirrao Mohite, the Maratha army general who succeeded Prataprao, and Rajasbai from the influential Ghatge family of Kagal. Rajaram had three sons,

- Raja Karna (died in 1700) with mistress Sagunabai
- Shivaji II with Tarabai,
- Sambhaji II with Rajasbai.

== Coronation and attack by the Mughals ==
After the execution of Sambhaji by the Mughals, Rajaram was informally crowned at Raigad on 12 March 1689. Rajaram then moved towards to the Bhavani temple at Pratapgad. As he went inspecting the fortresses that lay along the route, he had them provisioned and armed.

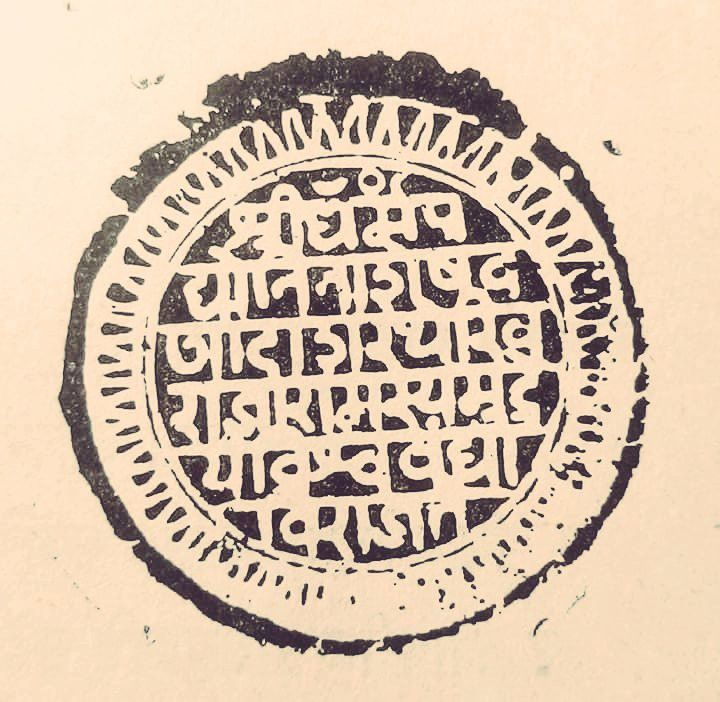
Royal Seal of Chhatrapati Rajaram: “Like the King Rama of old this seal of Rajaram shines forth, impelled by the motive of inspiring all people alike with a sense of their national duty."

As the Mughals under Itikad Khan (later Zulfikar Khan) started laying siege to the region around Raigad on 25 March 1689, Rajaram's general Santaji Ghorpade organized a counter offensive. Santaji's plan was for the Maratha army to entrench itself at Phaltan and from that base draw the attention of Mughal generals while Santaji and a small cavalry contingent would raid the main Mughal camp at Tulapur, and if possible kill Aurangzeb in the middle of his army. Santaji and Vithoji Chavan, his second in command, led a two thousand strong contingent for this purpose towards Tulapur. On stealthily reaching the Mughal camp they rushed at Aurangzeb's pavilion, cut down the supporting ropes and the huge cloth edifice came down in a crash, killing everyone inside. Afterwards it was discovered that Aurangzeb by chance was passing that night in his daughter's tent, thus escaping death.

After some rest at Sinhagad, Santaji led the Maratha contingent down the Bhor Ghat and attacked the rear of Itikad Khan's army besieging Raigad, carrying off five imperial Mughal war elephants. Following this Maratha contingents under Dhanaji Jadhav and Santaji attacked and completely routed Muqarrab Khan, the Mughal general responsible for capture of Sambhaji, at Bhudhargad 45 miles south of Kolhapur. Muqarrab Khan and his son were mortally wounded and chased up to the Mughal camp at Kolhapur and all their loot was captured.

Determined at all costs to take Raigad, Aurangzeb continued to send reinforcements to Itikad Zulfikar Khan, who was soon able to invade Panhala as well. Rajaram who was in Panhala slipped through the besieging lines.

A 300-strong Maratha army then fought with the Mughals and led the new Maratha king, Rajaram to escape through Kavlya ghat to the fort of Jinji in present-day state of Tamil Nadu via Pratapgad and Vishalgad forts. After crossing the crocodile-infested Tungabhadra river swimming on Bahirji Ghorpade's back, Rajaram and Bahirji reached Keladi (Near present-day Sagar in Karnataka) in disguise entering the territory of Kasim Khan. As per Keladinṛipavijaya of Linganna, Rajaram and Bahirji sought assistance from Queen Chennamma of Keladi - who kept the Mughal attack in check to ensure safe passage and escape of Rajaram. To punish Chennamma, Aurangzeb dispatched Jannisar Khan, Matabar Khan, and Sharza Khan, who captured the forts of Madhavpura, Anantpur and besieged Bednur while Chennama escaped to Bhuvangiri to save her life. The Maratha general Santaji Ghorpade then defeated the three Khans, protecting Chenamma and throttling the Khans' attempts to pursue Rajaram. Rajaram reached Jinji after a month and a half on 1 November 1689. Details of his escape are known from the incomplete poetical biography of Rajaram, the Rajaramacharita written by his Rajpurohita, Keshav Pandit, in Sanskrit. After defeating the Mughals, Rajaram cremated his late brother.

== Siege of Jinji ==
Aurangzeb deputed Ghazi-ud-din Firoze Jung against the Marathas in the Deccan, and specially sent Zulfiqar Khan Nusrat Jung to capture the Jingi Fort. He laid siege to it in September, 1690. When Rajaram had retired from Maharastra to Jinji, there was virtually no money in his treasury. Raigad, the capital of the Maratha Kingdom, fell into the hands of Aurangzeb. There were no practical centralised Maratha army or government. In these adverse circumstances Rajaram and his advisers were compelled to offer inducements of feudal estates to their helpers, in order to retain their services and allegiance.

Rajaram's Government deliberately weaned away many Maratha Chiefs who had accepted Mughal service. In turn, Aurangzeb profusely offered lands, titles and rewards as inducements to Maratha lords to renounce Rajaram and accept Mughal service. Maratha Government adopted the same methods for counteraction.

The Jinji siege dragged on through 1694 and 1695. After three failed Mughal attempts to conquer Jinji, it was captured on 8 January 1698. Rajaram, however, successfully escaped due to intervention of the Shirke family who hid him in the Mughal camp itself and then furnished him with horses to travel first to Vellore and later to Vishalgad.

== Santaji and Dhanaji ==
Rajaram had occupied the fort at Jinji from 11 November 1689, but left before it fell in 1698. Rajaram then set up his court at Satara Fort.

Rajaram then set his objectives on rallying the Maratha army to drive out the Mughal invaders.

In 1691, as a direct taunt to Mughal encroachment in the Deccan and to show off the undaunted morale of the Marathas, Rajaram issued contemptible bounties which were deliberately small to his generals for capturing Mughal cities. One such challenge was as follows: "Having clearly grasped your readiness to quit the Mughal service and return to the Chhatrapati's for defending the Maharashtra Dharma, we are assigning to you for your own personal expenses and those of your troops, an annuity...". Hanmantrao Ghorpade was entitled to receive, 62,500 hons after the capture of Raigad, 62,500 hons after the capture of Bijapur, 62,500 hons after the capture of Bhaganagar, 62,500 hons after the capture of Aurangabad, and 2,50,000 hons after the capture of Delhi itself. Similarly, Krishnaji Ghorpade was entitled to receive 12,500 hons after the conquest of Raigad territory, 12,500 hons after the conquest of Bijapur, 12,500 hons after the conquest of Bhaganagar, 12,500 hons after the conquest of Aurangabad and 50,000 hons after the conquest of Delhi.

Rajaram also aimed to capture Delhi, though he was unsuccessful.

Animated by a desire to avenge their wrongs, the Maratha bands spread over the vast territories from Khandesh to the south coast, over Gujarat, Baglan, Gondwana, and the Karnataka, devastating Mughal stations, destroying their armies, exacting tribute, plundering Mughal treasures, animals and stocks of camp equipage.

Through imminent peril Rajaram had won his goal and at Jinji had sustained that which scholars like C.A. Kincaid call, "a siege hardly shorter than that of Troy with the skill and valour and more than the fortunes of Hector".

== Death ==
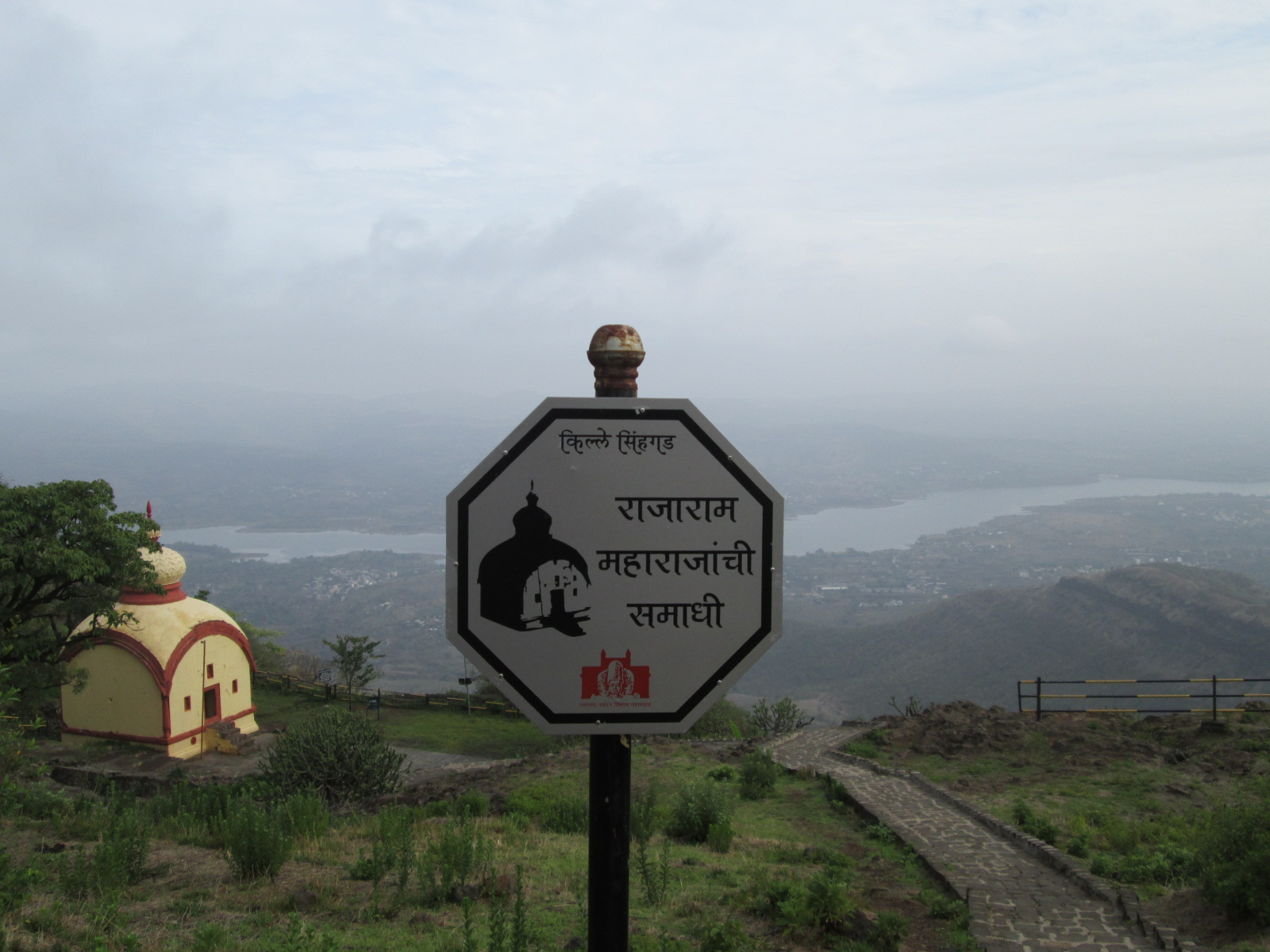
Memorial atop Sinhgad Fort marking the place of death of Rajaram.

Rajaram led a large Maratha force to attack the Mughal city of Jalna which he successfully plundered and set on fire. Entering the Godavari valley, he plundered Paithan, Beed and other Mughal-occupied towns along the river banks. Instead of progressing further he turned back towards Sinhagad to deposit the accumulated loot when his burdened army was ambushed by Zulfikar Khan. Rajaram fought a continuous series of rearguard actions for fifty miles, before reaching Sinhgad. The hardships and exposure of the chase had aggravated a weakness of Rajaram's lungs contracted at Jinji.

After some days high fever set in with frequent hemorrhages. Knowing his end was near, Rajaram called upon his council and commanded them not to relax their efforts in the war of liberation until Prince Shahu had been freed and the Mughals driven from the land of the Marathas. Rajaram died of lung disease in 1700 at Sinhagad near Pune in Maharashtra leaving behind widows and infants. Rajaram's funeral ceremonies were performed by Jivajiraje Bhonsle, the descendant of Vithoji Bhonsle, younger brother of Maloji Bhosale and Chhatrapati Shivaji's great uncle. To keep alive Rajaram's memory, Ramchandra Bavdekar built a temple to Shiva on the edge of Sinhgad fort. The temple was endowed with lands and money, and remains standing. Ambikabai, one of his widows, committed sati upon Rajaram's death. Many folk tales are centered on her powers of piety.

Rajaram's widow Tarabai then proclaimed her own young son, Shivaji II as the Chhatrapati Shivaji prophesied by Shivaji I destined to conquer all India from Attock to Rameshwaram, going against the popularly held notion that it was Shahu I (whose original name was Shivaji) who was to be the Shivaji prophesied about, and ruled as her son's regent. However, the release of Shahu, by the successors of Aurangzeb led to an internecine conflict between Tarabai and Shahu with the latter emerging as the successful claimant to the Maratha throne of Satara. Tarabai established a separate seat at Kolhapur and installed her son as the rival Chhatrapati. She was shortly deposed by Rajasbai, the other surviving widow of Rajaram. She installed her own son by Rajaram called Sambhaji II on the Kolhapur throne. The Kolhapur line has continued to this day through natural succession and adoptions per Hindu customs. The Satara seat passed to a grandson of Rajaram called Ramaraja after he was adopted at the insistence of Tarabai, by Shahu who did not have a natural male heir. Later Tarabai disowned him saying she had presented Shahu with an imposter.

== In popular culture ==
=== Literature ===
- Chhatrapati Rajaram Tararani (Dr. Sadashiv Shivade)
- Shivaputra Chhatrapati Rajaram (Dr. Jaysingrao Pawar)
- Swarajya Rakshanacha Ladha (Mohan Shete, Pandurang Balakawade, Sudhir Thorat)
- Hukumatpanah Ramchandrapant Amatya Charitra (Saurabh Deshpande)
- Chhatrapati Rajaram Maharaj (Ashokrao Shinde Sarkar)
- Marathi Riyasat - Chhatrapati Rajaram Govind Sakharam Sardesai)
- Bhangale Swapna Maharashtra (Drama, written by Bashir Momin Kavathekar)

=== Films and television ===
- He was portrayed by Pradnesh Tari in the 2017-2020 Indian historical serial Swarajyarakshak Sambhaji, based on the life of Sambhaji.
- He was portrayed by Swaraj Bhoite in 2024 Indian Marathi-language film Dharmarakshak Mahaveer Chhatrapati Sambhaji Maharaj.
- He was portrayed by Varun Buddhadev in the 2025 Hindi film Chhaava.

== See also ==
- Khando Ballal Chitnis

Preceded by Sambhaji	Chhatrapati of the Maratha Empire; 1689–1700	Succeeded by Shivaji II
