= Dharmarakshak Mahaveer Chhatrapati Sambhaji Maharaj =

2024 Indian epic historical war film

- Theatrical release poster
- Directed by: Tushar Shelar
- Written by: Sandeep Mohitepatil; Sudhir Nikam
- Produced by: Shekhar Mohitepatil; Saujanya Nikam; Dharmendra Bora; Ketanraje Bhosale
- Starring: Thakur Anoop Singh; Amruta Khanvilkar; Raj Zutshi
- Cinematography: Mahesh Aney
- Visual effects by: Chirag Bhuva
- Edited by: Shiva Bayappa
- Music by: Mohit Kulkarni
- Production company: Urvita Productions
- Release date: 22 November 2024
- Running time: 173 minutes
- Country: India
- Language: Marathi

Dharmarakshak Mahaveer Chhatrapati Sambhaji Maharaj (transl. Protector of the Faith, Great Warrior Chhatrapati Sambhaji Maharaj) is a 2024 Indian Marathi-language epic historical war film directed by Tushar Shelar and produced by Shekhar Mohitepatil, Saujanya Nikam, Dharmendra Bora, and Ketanraje Bhosale under Urvita Productions. It features Thakur Anoop Singh in the title role alongside Amruta Khanvilkar, Pradeep Rawat, Sanjay Khapre, Bhargavi Chirmule, Kamlesh Sawant, Kishori Shahane and Raj Zutshi in pivotal roles. Set against the backdrop of 17th century, it is a romanticised fictional portrayal of the life of Sambhaji, as he defends the Maratha Empire and Hindu faith against the Mughal Empire, showcasing his bravery, tactical genius, and unwavering spirit, solidifying his legacy as a revered protector of his people and culture.

The film was officially announced in January 2023, and its principal photography began in the latter half of the same year. The shooting took place sporadically throughout the year, with filming conducted in the interiors of Maharashtra to capture the region's authentic essence. Mohit Kulkarni composed the film's music, while cinematographer Mahesh Aney handled the cinematography and Chirag Bhuva helmed the visual effects.

The film was theatrically released in Marathi on 22 November 2024, followed by its Hindi version on 29 November 2024, and received positive reviews from critics, who praised its direction, performances, and production values. The film has grossed over ₹11.90 crore (US$1.2 million)–₹12.70 crore (US$1.3 million) worldwide, emerging as the fifth highest grossing Marathi film of 2024.

== Cast ==
- Thakur Anoop Singh as Chhatrapati Sambhaji Maharaj, second ruler of the Maratha Empire and Chhatrapati Shivaji Maharaj's eldest son.
- Amruta Khanvilkar as Maharani Yesubai Bhonsale, Sambhaji's wife.
- Kishori Shahane as Jijabai, the mother of Shivaji I.
- Bhargavi Chirmule as Dharaumata.
- Anand Pimpalkar as Guruji,.
- Pallavi Vaidya as Maharani Saibai Bhonsale, the first wife of Shivaji I and biological mother of Sambhaji.
- Krutika Tulaskar as Maharani Soyarabai Bhonsale, the second wife of Shivaji I, biological mother of Rajaram I and stepmother of Sambhaji.
- Pradeep Rawat as Muqarrab Khan,.
- Raj Zutshi as Alamgir Aurangzeb, the sixth Mughal Emperor.
- Ranjit Nikam as Siddhi Maulvi, a high-ranking general and influential leader of the Siddis.
- Sanjay Khapre as Sarsenapati Hambirrao Mohite, the Commander-in-Chief of the Maratha Empire under Shivaji I and later Sambhaji.
- Anil Gawas as Bahirji Naik.
- Ujjwal Chopra as Kavi Kalash
- Aarti Shinde as Salma
- Pradeep Kabra as Siddhi Kasam
- Kamlesh Sawant as Siddhi Khairiyat
- Prathamesh Katkar as Akbar
- Shraddha Shinde as Saraswati
- Trupti Rane as Laxmi
- Sheetal Patil as Durga
- Khushi Hajare as Sumi
- Kritika Velapure as Bhavani Sambhajiraje Bhosale.
- Vineet Sharma as Kondaji Farzand.
- Swaraj Bhoite as Rajaram Maharaj, the younger son of Shivaji I.
- Sandeep Mohitepatil as Mavala
- Rishank Mohite as Mavala
- Nitin Paygude as Mavala
- Shrihari Kale as Mavala
- Rajendra Bendre as Mavala
- Vishal Phale as Santaji Ghorpade.
- Pramod Kale as Dadaji Deshpande.
- Sachin Gawali as Giroji Baba.
- Suraj Khan as Daulat Khan
- Amy Aela as Sakina
- Prashant Mohite
- Shivshankar Swami as Shivshankar
- Dhanashri Kadam
- Mrunal Gaikwad
- Rahul Nevse
- Rahul Borole as Sardar

== Production ==
Following the grand success of the Marathi film Sarsenapati Hambirrao, Urvita Productions announced Dharmarakshak Mahaveer Chhatrapati Sambhaji Maharaj, in January 2023, marking the studio's second major production. Principal photography took place at Rajwada in Bhor, Jaoli village, and Vijaydurg Fort, with the first schedule of filming completed in November 2023, followed by the start of the second schedule in December. Initially, details about the cast were kept highly confidential. However, in August 2023, Thakur Anoop Singh was cast in the role of the legendary Maratha warrior, and speaking about the opportunity, he described it as a lifetime honor, stating, "Getting to play the role of Sambhaji Maharaj was a lifetime opportunity; not many actors have had the chance to portray such characters. I consider this a blessing." In May 2024, it was revealed that Thakur Anoop Singh, Amruta Khanvilkar, and Kishori Shahane would play the lead roles, with this film marking the first time Shahane has portrayed a historical character in her thirty-seven-year career.

== Soundtrack ==
The soundtrack album is composed by Mohit Kulkarni. On November 4, 2024, the much-anticipated title track was released in both Marathi and Hindi languages, showcasing the bravery, loyalty, and sacrifice, symbolizing the valiant spirit of the king. The second single, "Vaat Pahe Shambhuraya" was released on 11 November 2024, featuring Khanvilkar and Singh, with vocals by Shreya Ghoshal and choreography by Omkar Mane in both languages. The song beautifully captures the love, devotion, and historical bond between the two characters.

Marathi – Track listing
No.	Title	Lyrics	Music	Singer(s)	Length
1.	"Raja Sambhaji - Title Track"	Hrishikesh Zambare	Mohit Kulkarni	Nandesh Umap	4:20
2.	"Raja Sambhaji - Title Track (Sad version)"	Hrishikesh Zambare	Mohit Kulkarni	Aarya Ambekar	4:26
3.	"Vaat Pahe Shambhuraya"	Dr. Prasad Biware	Mohit Kulkarni	Shreya Ghoshal	5:19
4.	"Shambhurajyabhishek Geet"	Hrishikesh Zambare	Mohit Kulkarni, Narendra Bhide	Jaydeep Vaidya	6:40
5.	"Ram Setu"	Hrishikesh Zambare	Mohit Kulkarni	Janardan Dhatrak, Umesh Joshi, Vijay Dhuri, Vivek Naik, Devendra Chitnis, Santosh Bote, Siddhant Karawde, Mangesh Shirke, Anil Bhilare, Vidit Patankar	5:13
6.	"Marhaba"	Dr. Prasad Biware	Mohit Kulkarni	Sunidhi Chauhan	5:25
Total length:					31:23

Hindi – Track listing
No.	Title	Lyrics	Music	Singer(s)	Length
1.	"Sher Sambhaji - Title Track"	Hrishikesh Zambare	Mohit Kulkarni	Divya Kumar	4:20
2.	"Sher Sambhaji - Title Track (Sad version)"	Hrishikesh Zambare	Mohit Kulkarni	Aarya Ambekar	4:26
3.	"Jiya Jaye Na"	Dr. Prasad Biware	Mohit Kulkarni	Shreya Ghoshal	5:19
4.	"Shambhurajyabhishek Geet"	Hrishikesh Zambare	Mohit Kulkarni, Narendra Bhide	Jaydeep Vaidya	6:40
5.	"Jai Jai Ram"	Hrishikesh Zambare	Mohit Kulkarni	Janardan Dhatrak, Umesh Joshi, Vijay Dhuri, Vivek Naik, Devendra Chitnis, Santosh Bote, Siddhant Karawde, Mangesh Shirke, Anil Bhilare, Vidit Patankar	5:13
6.	"Marhaba"	Dr. Prasad Biware	Mohit Kulkarni	Sunidhi Chauhan	5:25
Total length:					31:23

Dharmarakshak Mahaveer Chhatrapati Sambhaji Maharaj (OST) – Background score
No.	Title	Music	Length
1.	"Chhatrapati Sambhaji Maharaj Theme"	Mohit Kulkarni	1:00
2.	"Chhatrapati Sambhaji Maharaj Ra Ra Theme 1"	Sandeep Mohite Patil	0:30
3.	"Chhatrapati Sambhaji Maharaj Ra Ra Theme 2"	Sandeep Mohite Patil	0:24
4.	"Burhanpur Victory"	Utsav Shrey, Amarjeet Prabhudesai	1:38
5.	"Fall of Sambhaji Maharaj"	Utsav Shrey, Amarjeet Prabhudesai	0:56
6.	"Ghor Tu"	Utsav Shrey, Amarjeet Prabhudesai	2:06
7.	"Jijamata's Blessing"	Utsav Shrey, Amarjeet Prabhudesai	0:43
8.	"Maharaj's Tandav – Rudra Raga"	Utsav Shrey, Amarjeet Prabhudesai	0:36
9.	"Maharaj's Youngest Soldier"	Utsav Shrey, Amarjeet Prabhudesai	1:20
10.	"Mother's Demise"	Utsav Shrey, Amarjeet Prabhudesai	2:06
11.	"Sambhaji Maharaj's Entry"	Utsav Shrey, Amarjeet Prabhudesai	1:04
12.	"Yesubai – The Royal Queen"	Utsav Shrey, Amarjeet Prabhudesai	0:25
13.	"Aurangzeb Theme"	Mohit Kulkarni	0:25
14.	"Kondaji True Warrior"	Mohit Kulkarni	1:00
15.	"Kondaji's Demise"	Mohit Kulkarni	1:43
16.	"Kondaji's Promise"	Mohit Kulkarni	0:23
17.	"Maharaj Helping Kavi Kalash"	Mohit Kulkarni	0:24
18.	"Sambhaji Maharaj Meet Shivaji Maharaj"	Mohit Kulkarni	1:31
19.	"Maharaj's Entry on Ship"	Mohit Kulkarni	0:22
20.	"Sambhaji Maharaj's Hanuman Chalisa"	Mohit Kulkarni	2:05
21.	"Maharaj's Maratha Speech"	Mohit Kulkarni	0:59
22.	"Maratha Attack on Janjira"	Mohit Kulkarni	0:26
23.	"Maharani Yesubai Ready for Battle"	Mohit Kulkarni	1:20
Total length:			26:09

== Marketing and release ==
On the occasion of Sambhaji Maharaj's birth anniversary, on 14 May 2024, the first look poster of the movie featuring Singh's character was unveiled in a grand event in Pune organized by Suryoday Pratishthan, led by Navnath Pathare Patil, in the presence of thousands of devotees of Chhatrapati. Character reveals began on the first day of Navaratri, starting with Khanvilkar's portrayal of Maharani Yesubai in a yellow saree and traditional Maharashtrian jewelry, praying before a Shivling, followed by Shahane's portrayal of Jijamata in a green saree holding a child wrapped in orange cloth, and Chimule as Dharamata, seated with a toddler and teaching him to wield a sword and shield. Other key characters, including Saibai Bhonsale, Soyarabai Bhonsale, Kondaji Farzand, Rajaram Maharaj, the Mavalas and the Siddhis, were also revealed during this period.

Initially scheduled for release on 15 November 2024, the film was later postponed by a week, with the official teaser, launched on 11 October 2024, offered a glimpse of Singh in character and announcing the new release date of 22 November. The much-awaited trailer of 2 minutes 36 seconds was released in both Hindi and Marathi on 12 November 2024, during a grand launch event at PVR, City Mall, Mumbai. The event was attended by the film's cast and crew, including Thakur Anoop Singh, Pradeep Rawat, Bhargavi Chirmule, Amruta Khanvilkar, Anand Pimpalkar, all four producers, and Pens Studios founder Jayantilal Gada. A day before the trailer launch, producer Sandeep Mohitepatil met with Udayanraje Bhosale and MLA Shivendrasinh Raje Bhosale, members of the Chhatrapati family, to give them a special preview of the trailer. The trailer received a positive response from the audience, generating anticipation for the film's release. The film's Marathi version was released on 22 November 2024, while the Hindi version followed a week later on 29 November 2024. On 25 November, a special screening was held for Udayanraje Bhosale and his family at their residence in Jal Mandir Palace, Satara. Rajmata Kalpanaraje Bhonsale remarked, "A wonderful film has been made. This film is not only good, but the actors have also added much to it. Everyone has played their characters well." Maharani Damayanti Udayanraje Bhonsale added, "The film's direction, dialogues, acting, proper use of VFX, and many other aspects have made this film even better."

=== Controversy and challenges ===
Upon its release, the film received a positive response from audiences, especially in Maharashtra. However, it faced challenges due to limited screen allocation following the release of big-budget films like the pan-India Pushpa 2: The Rule. Reports emerged indicating that theaters prioritized commercial blockbusters, leaving minimal or no slots for the film. In response to this issue, Swati Pisal, the president of Astha Social Organization, stated that a joint meeting was held with Radhika Panhal, president of Manav Parivartan Vikas Multipurpose Charitable Organization, Anil Gharal of Maratha Federation, Rajendra Mane, Jaibhau Suryavanshi of Shiv Sena, and others. Pisal mentioned that a statement would be submitted to the Chief Minister, Provincial Officer, and Superintendent of Police. She described the situation as "very shameful and regrettable for progressive Maharashtra."

On 9 December 2024, the Maharashtra Navnirman Sena (MNS) issued a stern warning to the management of Miraj Ashok Anil Cinemas in Ulhasnagar, threatening to halt all shows at the theater if Dharmarakshak Mahaveer Chhatrapati Sambhaji Maharaj was not scheduled, as the theater had not screened a single show of the film. MNS leaders, including district president Bandu Deshmukh and city president Sanjay Ghuge, protested outside the theater, accusing it of sidelining the film while allocating 15 daily shows to Pushpa 2 and a single show to The Sabarmati Report. Following these protests, the theater management assured the party that the film would be given slots within two days. The controversy highlighted ongoing issues of unequal screen distribution, especially for regional and historical films, sparking a wider debate about the need for fair opportunities for Marathi cinema.

== Reception ==
=== Critical response ===
Dharmarakshak Mahaveer Chhatrapati Sambhaji Maharaj has received positive reviews from both critics and audiences, who have praised the performances, grandeur, story, writing and VFX, although some critics have criticized its lengthy runtime.

Mudit Bhatnagar of Times Now praised the film for its visuals, sets, costumes, and strong performances, particularly the tension between Sambhaji and Aurangzeb, stating, "It offers a respectable portrayal of a legendary figure. While it has its flaws, it succeeds in telling an important story with heart and sincerity." He gave the film three stars out of five. In his review for Sakal, Santosh Bhingarde awarded the film four out of five stars, commending its overall execution. He wrote, "It seems that director Tushar Shelar has done a lot of research while presenting this heroic story. The important events in the life of Sambhaji Maharaj have been carefully considered. Maharaj's courage, his bravery and his loyalty and sacrifice have been told how inspiring it is to the present generation." Keerti Kadam of Cinebuster described it as "a sincere attempt to honour the legacy" and wrote, "The film’s strengths lie in its sincere attempt to honour the legacy of Chhatrapati Sambhaji Maharaj, stunning visuals, and commendable performances." She also pointed out its drawbacks, including "inconsistent pacing and a lack of emotional exploration, particularly in Sambhaji and Yesubai’s personal life," and rated the film 3.5 stars.

=== Accolades ===
Awards	Year	Category	Recipient	Result	Ref
International Iconic Awards Marathi	2024	Best Versatile Actress	Kishori Shahane	Won	
Filmfare Awards Marathi	2025	Best Production Design	Vijay Mahamulkar	Nominated	
Filmfare Awards Marathi	2025	Best Costume Design	Ganesh Lonare	Nominated	
Maharashtra State Film Awards	2026	Best Film	Dharmarakshak Mahaveer Chhatrapati Sambhaji Maharaj	Nominated	
Maharashtra State Film Awards	2026	Best Director	Tushar Shelar	Nominated	
Maharashtra State Film Awards	2026	Best Music Director	Mohit Kulkarni	Nominated	
Maharashtra State Film Awards	2026	Best Costume Design	Ganesh Lonare	Won	
Maharashtra State Film Awards	2026	Best Make-up	Santosh Gilbile	Won	
