= Execution of Sambhaji =

1689 execution of the second Maratha king

- Part of the Deccan wars
- Date: 19 February – 11 March 1689
- Duration: Three weeks
- Venue: Tulapur arch
- Location: Tulapur; 18.6694°N 73.9955°E
- Type: Execution by beheading
- Cause: Wars with the Mughal Empire
- Reporter: Khafi Khan; Ishwar Das
- Organized by: Mughal Empire
- Deaths: 2
- Verdict: Death sentence
- Convictions: Rape, killing and plunder

Sambhaji, the second Maratha king, was put to death by order of the Mughal emperor Aurangzeb in the 17th century. The conflicts between the Mughals and the Deccan Sultanates, which resulted in the downfall of the Sultanates, paved the way for tensions between the Marathas and the Mughals. During the Deccan Wars, Aurangzeb was drawn to southern India due to the Maratha attack on Burhanpur and his rebellious son, Muhammad Akbar who was supported by Sambhaji. After some battles and skirmishes, the Mughal commander Muqarrab Khan captured Sambhaji along with some of his officers. They were executed by the command of Aurangzeb at Tulapur in modern-day Maharashtra.

== Background ==
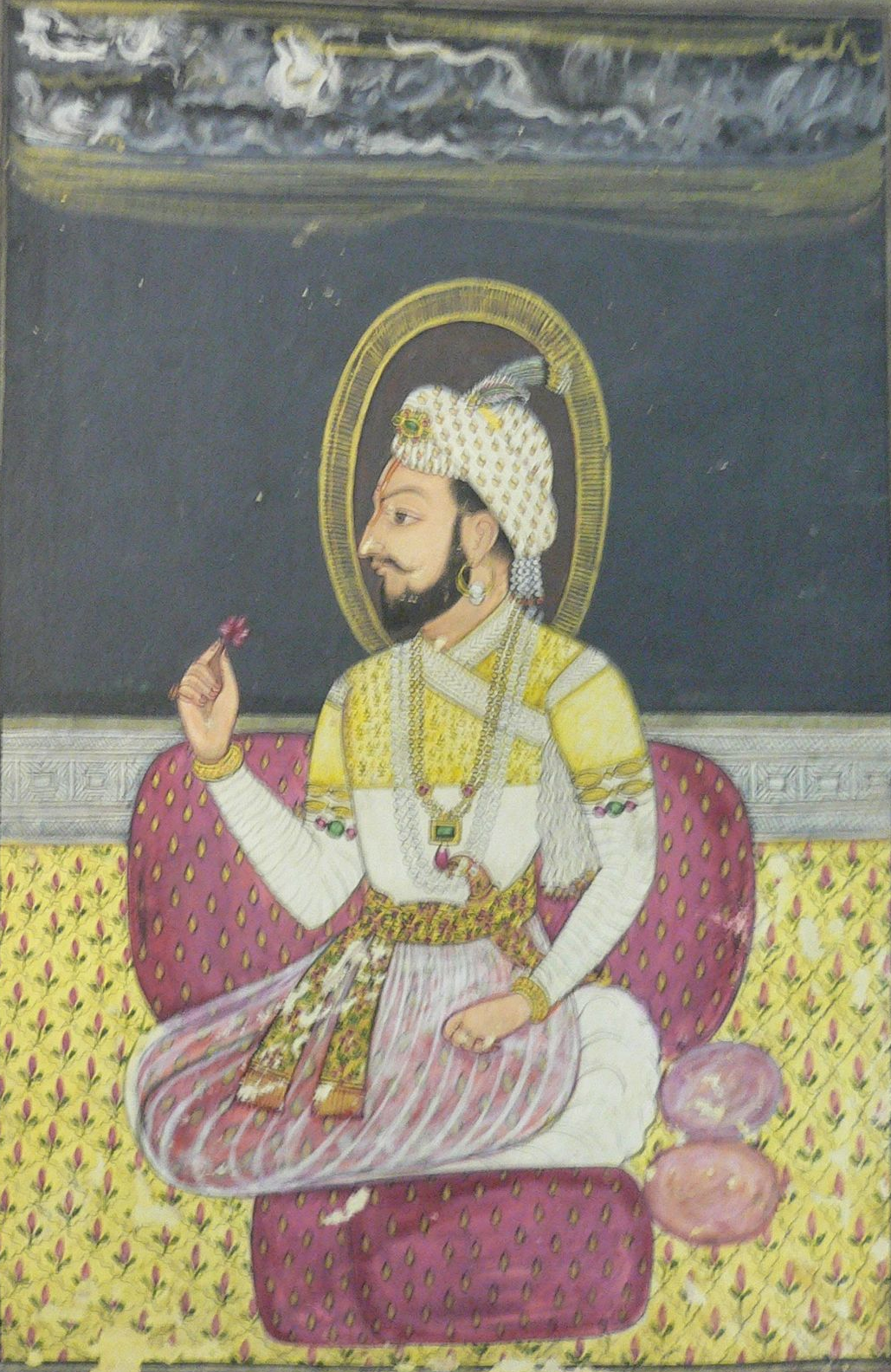
Portrait of Sambhaji

After the death of Sambhaji's father Shivaji in 1680, he escaped from the Panhala fort where he was kept captive by his father and proclaimed himself king, eliminating all of Shivaji's ministers who opposed his succession. Once on the throne, Sambhaji waged numerous campaigns against the Mughals, following in his father's footsteps. After the Maratha Sack of Burhanpur the Marathas burnt, loot, raped and tortured the people of Burhanpur. According to John F Richards, Sambhaji unlike his father's footsteps, condoned the rape and violence committed by his army during the sieges. To the Nobles of Burhanpur, Sambhaji's raid was more than just a disruption of public order; it was seen as an attack on the Muslim community by a non-believer. If the Mughal Empire failed to protect the lives and property of Muslims, it was believed that Aurangzeb's titles as ruler should not be acknowledged during the Friday congregational prayers. Under pressure from the Muslim nobles of Burhanpur and the rebellious son, Akbar who was supported by Sambhaji, Aurangzeb launched a campaign towards the Deccan region.

During the Mughal siege of Golconda and Bijapur, Muslim Ulema from Bijapur questioned Aurangzeb about how he could justify waging war against fellow Muslims. Aurangzeb's response was that the Sultan had harbored and aided Sambhaji, who had been causing harm to Muslims across the region. Aurangzeb also condemned Abul Hasan for the additional offense of relinquishing control of his state to his two Brahmin ministers. The fall of the Deccan Sultanates marked the beginning of a new chapter in Deccan history known as the "Deccan Wars".

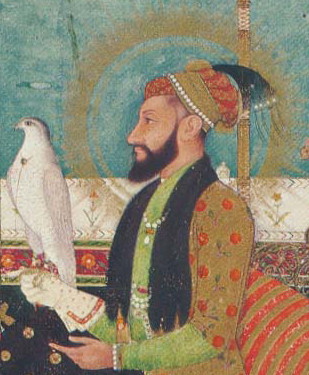
Aurangzeb

== Capture of Sambhaji ==
While Aurangzeb was besieging Golconda and Bijapur, Sambhaji observed his movements from the fort of Panhala. Following the capture of Bijapur and Golconda, a significant amount of wealth and military resources fell into Mughal hands. After seizing these two key forts, Aurangzeb deployed Sarja Khan, a general from Bijapur familiar with the Deccan terrain.

In December 1687, the Battle of Wai unfolded between the Maratha forces under the command of Hambirrao Mohite, dispatched by Sambhaji, and the Mughal forces led by Sarja Khan. Despite the Maratha forces emerging victorious, Mohite was killed by a cannonball during the conflict. Sambhaji's military strength dwindled after the battle, prompting him to relocate with a smaller contingent of soldiers. His camp faced encirclement by Mughal agents within the confines of the Raigarh and Panhala hills. The Maratha faction led by the Shirkes betrayed Sambhaji by divulging his movements to the Mughals, resulting in the revelation of Sambhaji's whereabouts. They provided daily updates on his movements to the Mughals, ultimately leading to Sambhaji's failure to safeguard himself, despite his efforts to protect the kingdom.

Sambhaji was caught off guard by the Mughal commander Muqarrab Khan, resulting in a battle at Sangameshwar where the Marathas suffered casualties, leading to their defeat. Five Marathas were killed, and the remaining fled. Sambhaji's minister, Kavi Kalash, was captured, while Sambhaji himself managed to escape and seek refuge in a temple. The Mughals discovered his hiding place, and despite his attempts to flee, Sambhaji was apprehended on 1 February 1689. Twenty-five others among Sambhaji's officers were also captured. Muqarrab Khan transported them to Akluj, where Aurangzeb was. Upon receiving the news of their capture, Aurangzeb was pleased and renamed the place Asadnagar to commemorate the event.

== Execution ==
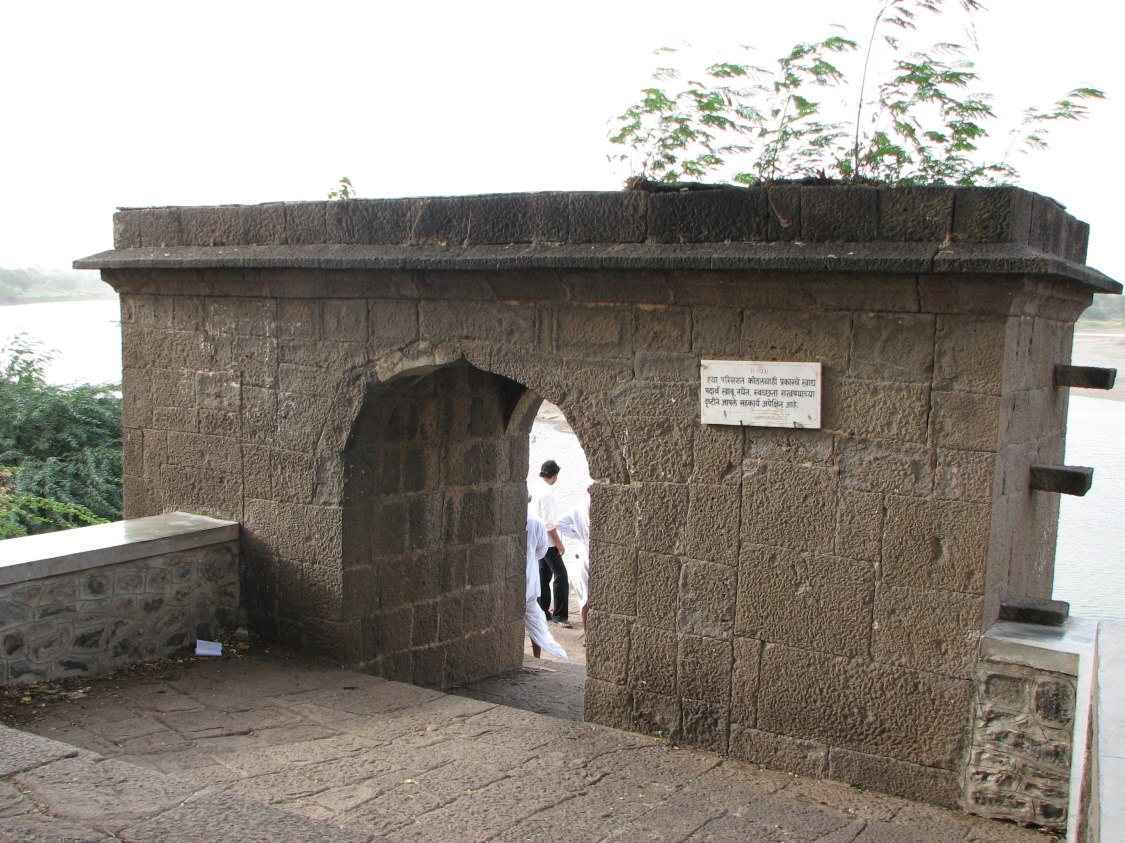
Tulapur stone arch, where Sambhaji was executed

Sambhaji and Kavi Kalash were taken to the Imperial encampment near the Bhima river. Despite Sambhaji's royal status, he was not accorded the same respect as the Mughals granted to the rulers of Bijapur and Golconda. Instead, he and his ministers were humiliated by being dressed as buffoons in long fool's caps with bells attached, mounted on a camel, and paraded through the Mughal camps amidst the beating of drums and the pealing of trumpets. They were then presented to Aurangzeb, who was offering a thanksgiving prayer. According to the Mughal chronicler, Khafi Khan (Note: Khafi Khan wrote his chronicles decades after the execution. He is not believed to have been an eye witness to the trial and execution of Sambhaji or Aurangzeb's Deccan campaign) and Ishwar Das Nagar, that very night, Sambhaji and Kavi Kalash were blinded with red-hot irons. A panel of ulama sentenced Sambhaji to death for killing muslims and plunder of towns. On 11 March 1689, at Koregaon on the River Bhima, where Aurangzeb was encamped, Sambhaji was beheaded. Aurangzeb's dream was thus fulfilled before he had been six years in the Deccan. The entire region from Narmada to Tungabhadra now lay under his dominion. The land where Shivaji had once fought was subdued, and no signs of resistance remained. Sambhaji's remains were fed to the dogs.

== Aftermath ==
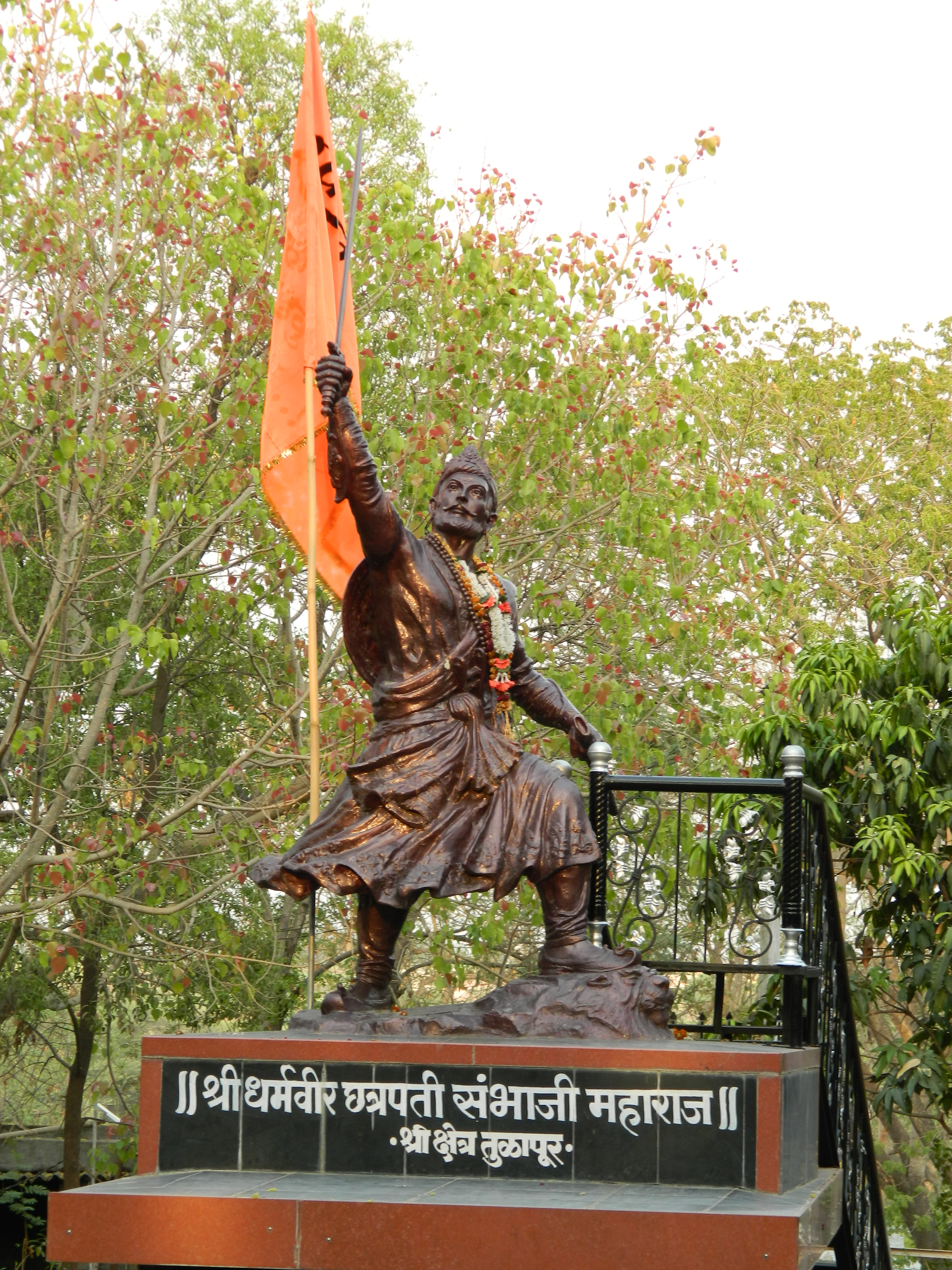
Statue of Sambhaji

During his reign, Sambhaji was unable to accomplish much for his people. However, his death elevated him to the status of a martyr. Sambhaji's son, Shahu, was held captive by Aurangzeb and was only released when he reached maturity. Following these events, the Mughals reached their peak in terms of territorial expansion, establishing the farthest extent of dominion in the subcontinent. Despite this, conflicts between the Marathas and Mughals persisted. Rajaram, the brother of Sambhaji, sought refuge in the Jinjee fort in the south, while Maratha officers continued their raids in the northern Deccan region.
