= Soyarabai =

Maharani of the Marathas from 1674 to 1680

Soyarabai Bhonsale
- Maharani

Chief Queen Consort of the Maratha Kingdom
- Tenure: 6 June 1674 – 3 April 1680
- Predecessor: Saibai
- Successor: Yesubai

Rajmata of Maratha Empire
- Tenure: 1680 - 1681
- Predecessor: Jijabai
- Successor: Sakvarbai
- Born: Soyarabai Mohite; 1634
- Died: 1681 (aged 46–47); Raigad Fort, Maharashtra
- Spouse: Shivaji
- Issue: Deepa Bai; Chhatrapati Rajaram Maharaj
Names
- Soyarabai Shivajiraje Bhonsale
Regnal name
- Shrimant Akhand Soubhagyavati Maharani Soyarabai Rani Saheb Bhosale
- House: Mohite (before Marriage); Bhonsle (by marriage)
- Father: Sambhaji Mohite
- Religion: Hinduism

Soyarabai Bhosale (née Mohite; 1634–1681) was the second wife of Shivaji, the founder of the Maratha Kingdom in western India. She was the mother of Shivaji's second son, Rajaram. She was the younger sister of the Maratha army chief, Hambirrao Mohite.

== Early life ==
Soyarabai was the daughter of Sambhaji Mohite, whose sister Tukabai was the second wife of Shahaji. The precise date of Soyarabai's marriage to Chhatrapati Shivaji Maharaj is unclear, but various sources give the years as 1642, 1650 and 1660. In all probability, Soyarabai was married before 1650. The marriage took place when Shivaji visited his father Shahaji at Bangalore with his mother Jijabai. Tukabai, the stepmother of Shivaji and paternal aunt of Soyarabai, insisted on the marriage.

After the death of Saibai in 1659 and Jijabai in 1674, Soyarabai gained prominence in Chhatrapati Shivaji Maharaj's family and, by extension, in the politics of the Maratha court. Soyrabai bore Shivaji two children: a daughter Balibai and son Rajaram.

== After Chhatrapati Shivaji Maharaj's death ==
Contemporary Maratha court chronicles such as Parmananda relate that, in initial phases, Soyarabai herself was against the court ministers performing the coronation of her son Rajaram. Sambhaji is recorded as testifying that, "the ministers of Shivaji were against him (Sambhaji). They poisoned the mind of Queen Soyarabai by saying that the eldest son of Shivaji (Sambhaji) should not be allowed to inherit the throne". Sambhaji was not informed of Chhatrapati Shivaji Maharaj's death by these ministers, and he was absent at Raigad when Shivaji was cremated. After Shivaji's death in 1680, with the help of those treacherous courtiers, Soyarabai finally got her son, the ten-year-old prince Rajaram, seated on the vacant throne on 21 April 1680. Her stepson and Chhatrapati Shivaji Maharaj's heir apparent Sambhaji, was able to remove Rajaram and Soyarabai from power with the help of Soyarabai's own brother and the Maratha Sarsenapati (General) Hambirrao Mohite. He imprisoned the courtiers opposing him and formally assumed power as the Chhatrapati on 20 July 1680. Soyarabai's henchmen tried to poison Sambhaji in August 1681, but he survived and executed the criminals, installing their sons on their posts instead.

In a letter dated 27 October 1681, written by British Bombay council to Surat, they claim that "Ramrajah's Mother (Soyra Bai) is dead by report, poisoned by Shambhuji Rajah's contrivance " This has been declared a myth by various reputed scholars such as Dr. Sadashiv Shivade and Vasudeo Sitaram Bendrey, as Soyarabai died a year and a half after this date of her alleged murder and was cremated by Chhatrapati Sambhaji himself.

After Sambhaji's death at the hands of the Mughals, Rajaram did become the next Chhatrapati, carrying forward the continuous war of the Marathas against the Mughals.

== In popular culture ==
=== Films and television ===
- Neelam Shirke portrays Soyarabai in the 2008-2009 Marathi serial Raja Shivchhatrapati.
- Monika Dabade portrays Soyarabai in the 2011 Marathi film Rajmata Jijau.
- Ayesha Kaduskar portrays a young Soyarabai while Ruchita Jadhav portrays the older Soyarabai in the 2011 series Veer Shivaji.
- Gauri Kiran plays Soyrabai in the 2019-2021 Indian historical TV serial Swarajyajanani Jijamata.
- Snehlata Vasaikar plays Soyrabai in Swarajyarakshak Sambhaji Serial (2017)
- Elakshi Gupta plays Soyrabai in the 2019 Bollywood film Tanhaji.
- Ruchi Savarn portrays Soyarabai in the 2019 Marathi film Fatteshikast.
- Ruchi Savarn portrays Soyarabai in the 2022 Marathi film Pawankhind.
- Shruti Marathe plays Soyarabai in 2022 film, Sarsenapati Hambirrao.
- Madhavi Neemka plays Soyarabai in 2022 film, Sher Shivraj.
- Nupur Daithankar plays Soyarabai in 2023 film, Subhedar.
- Krutika Tulaskar in 2024 film Dharmarakshak Mahaveer Chhatrapati Sambhaji Maharaj: Part 1
- Divya Dutta in 2025 film Chhaava
- Elakshi Gupta in 2025 film Veer Murarbaji
- Nupur Daithankar in 2026 film Ranapati Shivray: Swari Agra.

== See also ==
- Shivaji
- Chhatrapati Rajaram
- Maratha Empire
