= Kavi Kalash =

Advisor and Confidante of the Second Chhatrapati

Chandogamatya Kavi Kalash

Royal Poet of the Maratha Empire
- In office 1680–1689
- Monarch: Sambhaji
- Prime Minister: Moropant Trimbak Pingale

Personal details
- Born: Unnao, Mughal Empire (present day Uttar Pradesh, India)
- Died: 11 March 1689 Tulapur, Maratha Empire (present-day Maharashtra, India)
- Cause of death: Execution
- Occupation: Poet, advisor, military commander
- Known for: Confidant of Chhatrapati Sambhaji

Military service
- Allegiance: Maratha Empire
- Battles/wars: Sack of Burhanpur; Mughal invasions of Konkan

Kavi Kalash was an Indian poet, military commander and a close friend of Chhatrapati Sambhaji I of the Maratha Empire who reigned from 1680 to 1689.

== Early life ==
Born in Unnao district, Kalash was a North Indian Brahmin Poet from Kannauj by birth and an administrator as well as a warrior who accompanied Chhatrapati Sambhaji Maharaj in many of his campaigns. He is known to have defeated Shahabuddin Khan in a fierce battle near Raigad Fort in 1684. He was given the title, Chandogamatya (Pinnacle of Poets), by Sambhaji Maharaj.

== Death ==
In March 1689, Kavi Kalash was captured along with Maratha King Sambhaji by the Mughal army under the Mughal Emperor Aurangzeb in Sangameshwar, and was tortured alongside Sambhaji. It is said that Aurangzeb celebrated the capture of Sambhaji and Kavi Kalash so much that he got down from his throne. Taking that opportunity, Kavi Kalash made an impromptu poem:

यावन रावन की सभा संभू बंन्ध्यो बजरंग।

लहू लसत सिंदूर सम खूब खेल्यो रनरंग॥

ज्यो रबि छबि लखतही नथीत होत बदरंग।

त्यो तव तेज निहारके तखत त्यजो अवरंग॥

which translates to:

Sambhaji (maharaj) has been tied like Hanuman in the court of Raavan (i.e., Aurangzeb)

Maharaj looking red because of wounds and blood from the great war he fought

The way fireflies lose their glow after sunrise,

Seeing your effulgence, Aurangzeb (also lost his glow and) gave up his throne.

Listening to the poem enraged Aurangzeb. He ordered Kavi Kalash's tongue be cut/plucked. Eventually Sambhaji Maharaj and Kavi Kalash were paraded between the crowds, in clowns' clothes. According to accounts, Kavi Kalash and Chhatrapati Sambhaji Maharaj endured unimaginable torture after being captured by Aurangzeb in 1689. The Mughal emperor, determined to break their spirit, subjected both Sambhaji Maharaj and Kavi Kalash to extreme brutality. They were first humiliated by being chained and paraded across Mughal territories in torn clothes, enduring public insults and abuse. Their beards and hair were forcefully pulled out, and their nails were ripped off to inflict unbearable pain. Their tongues were either cut or severely damaged to silence them. Red-hot iron rods were pressed against their bodies, and their flesh was torn apart using burning pliers. Their wounds were deliberately rubbed with salt and chili powder to intensify the suffering. The torture continued for 40 days, yet Kavi Kalash remained resolute, refusing to surrender or betray Sambhaji Maharaj. Eventually, both were brutally executed—beheaded after enduring prolonged agony. Their mutilated bodies were discarded into the river to prevent a dignified cremation. Despite the horrific end, Kavi Kalash's unwavering loyalty and courage became a symbol of sacrifice and devotion in Maratha history.

== In popular culture ==
=== Films and television ===
- He was portrayed by Rahul Mehendale in the 2017-2020 Indian historical Swarajyarakshak Sambhaji.
- He was portrayed by Ujjwal Chopra in 2024 Indian Marathi-language film Dharmarakshak Mahaveer Chhatrapati Sambhaji Maharaj.
- He was portrayed by Vineet Kumar Singh in the 2025 Hindi film Chhaava.
