= Vilas Sawant =

Indian politician

Maharashtra Legislative Assembly- Home Minister
- In office 1985–1990
- Constituency: Naigaon Vidhan Sabha constituency
- In office 1972–1978

Personal details
- Party: Indian National Congress
- Occupation: Politician

Vilas Vishnu Sawant is a former Indian politician and a two term member of the Maharashtra Legislative Assembly. Sawant was elected twice from the Naigaon Assembly constituency.
