= Tulapur =

Village in Maharashtra

Coordinates: 18°40′11″N 73°59′40″E

Tulapur is a village in Pune district, Maharashtra, India, associated with the last execution of Chhatrapati Sambhaji Maharaj, second Chhatrapati and son of Chhatrapati Shivaji Maharaj.

== Etymology ==
Tulapur village was originally known as Nagargaon. It was renamed Tulapur when Shahajiraje used a boat to weigh an elephant to help Adil Shahi minister, Murarpant donate silver equivalent to the weight of an elephant.

== History ==
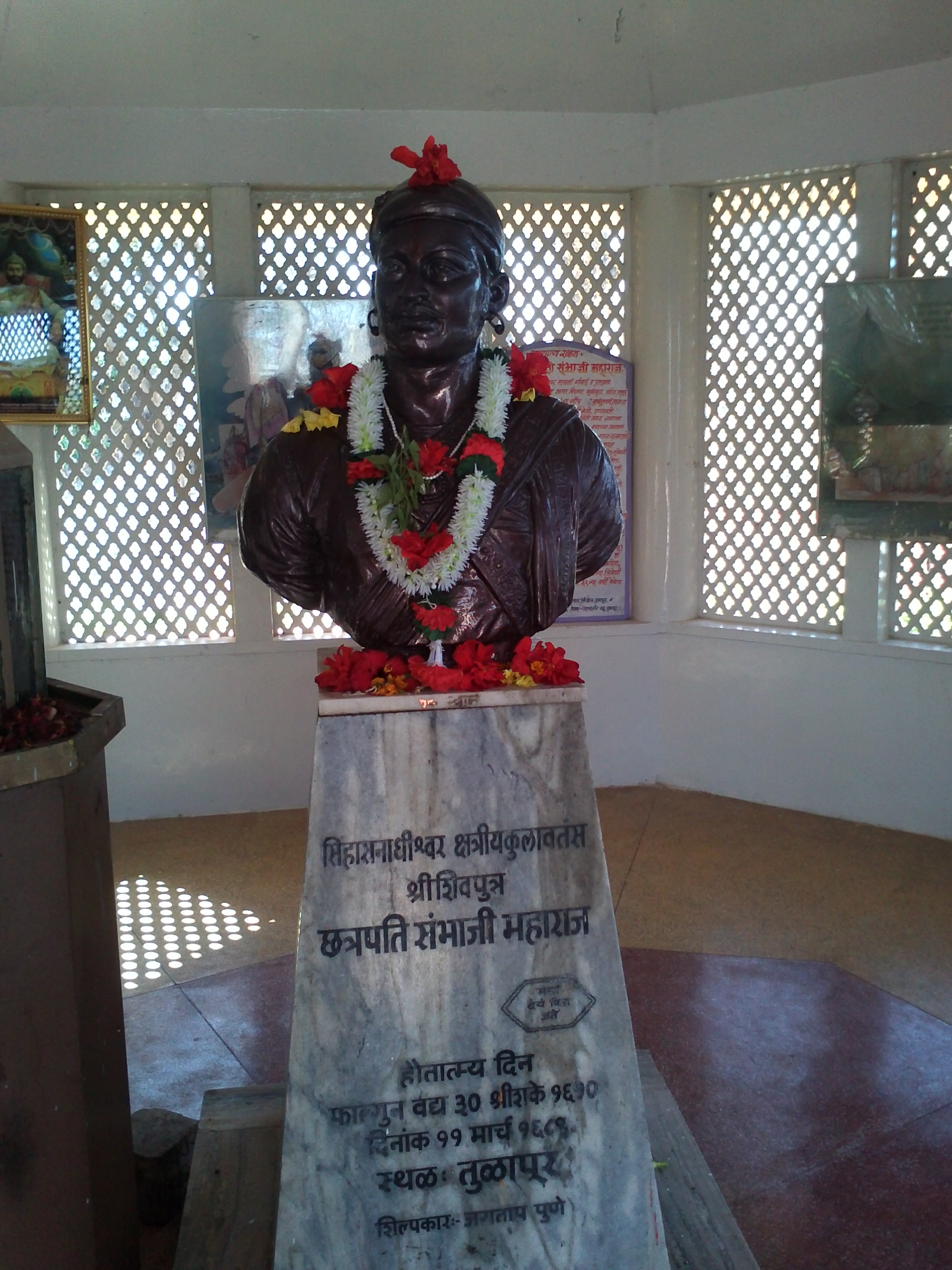
Bust of Sambhaji at Tulapur

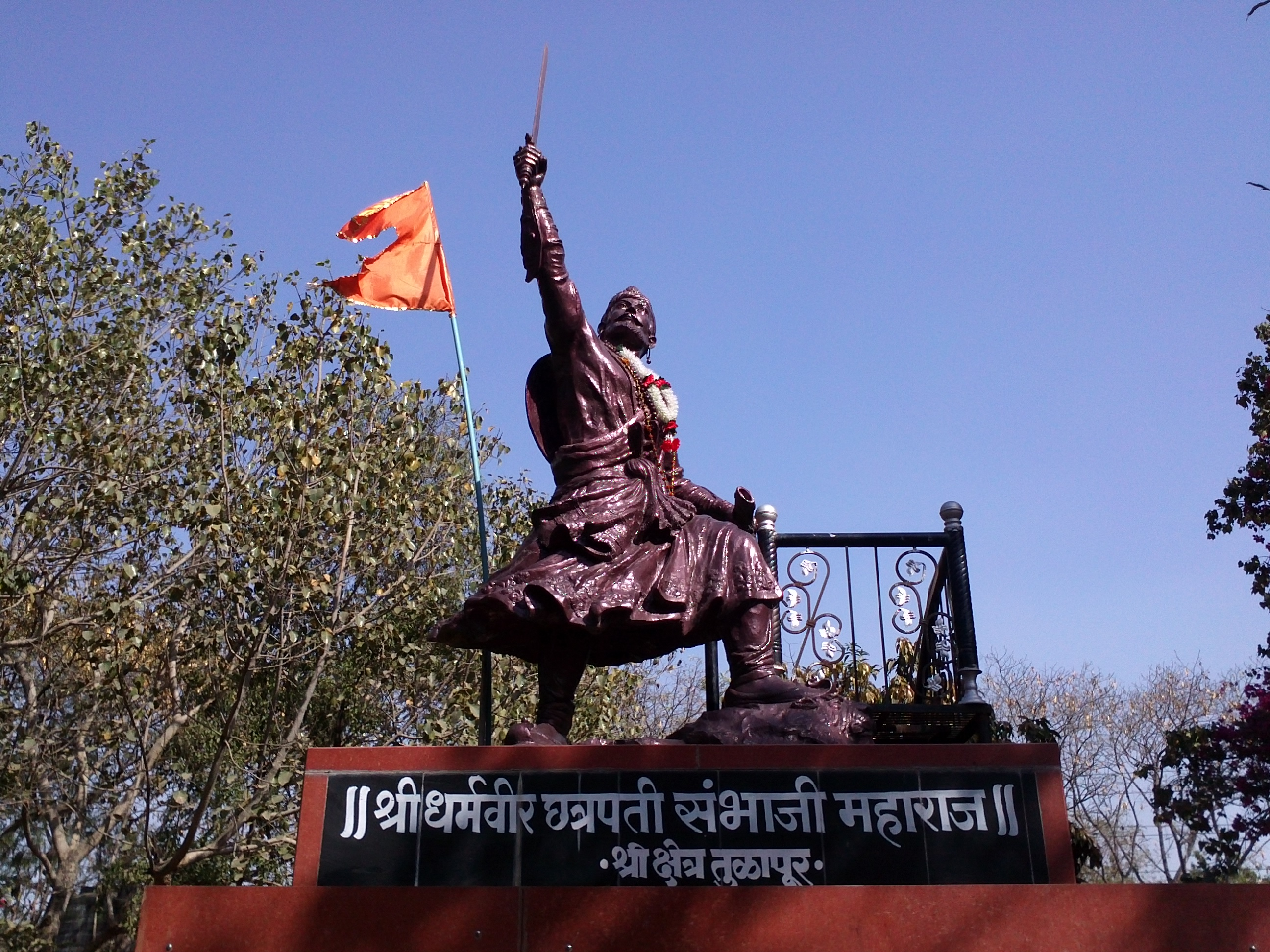
Statue of Sambhaji in Tulapur

Tulapur has great significance in Maratha history. Chatrapati Sambhaji was brought to Tulapur to be tortured and executed after he was captured by Mughal forces. Chatrapati Sambhaji was originally captured in Sangameshwar, a renowned Hindu holy place in Ratnagiri, about 40 miles west of Shrirangpur in Western India. Note: The Sangameshwar temple located at Tulapur should not be confused with the place called Sangameshwar.

Chatrapati Sambhaji Maharaj had recently visited Shrirangpur to resolve a family dispute before arriving at Sangameshwar. Ganoji Shirke led Sheikh Nizam Hyderabadi (later known as Muqarrab Khan, a title bestowed by Aurangzeb) through dense and inaccessible Sahyadri jungles via Ambay ghat in order to ambush and arrest Chatrapati Sambhaji. Sambhaji could have easily escaped with the early warning of the arrival of Mogul forces by his spies. Sambhaji also had better horses, and could outrun the enemy forces who were exhausted from their approach through the hills and passages of Sahyadri. Some of his forces safely retreated to Raigad on his advice. However, it is unknown why he stayed and fought with such a small force.

A place with more than 360 ancient Hindu temples. Sambhaji was a great devout of Lord Shiva and was paying his respects at the holiest place. The false propaganda was to malign him for political gains by his enemies. When humiliated before Aurangzeb, Sambhaji Mahraj was singing praises of Lord Shiva, thus affirming the fact that his presence at the holy place was for religious purposes only. He thoroughly fell in trance with Lord Shiva before capture, not very uncommon among devotees visiting Sangameshwar for pilgrimage.

== Geography ==
Tulapur is about 40 Kilometres north-east of Pune. It is situated at the confluence of the Bhima and Indrayani rivers and was originally known as 'Nagargaon'. The Sangameshwar temple built on their banks is a popular site for tourists and devotees.

== Samadhi (shrine) of Sambhaji ==
There is a Samadhi (shrine) of Chatrapati Sambhaji Maharaj next to the temple. A samadhi of Kavi Kalash, a poet, a close friend and advisor to Sambhaji is also present at Vadhu. It is disputed as to where exactly he was cremated, with a group of historians asserting that he was cremated at Tulapur itself and not at Vadhu. Nonetheless, both these places have their equal share in Maratha history.
