= Siege of Panhala =

Siege of Panhala may refer to:

- Siege of Panhala (1660), Shivaji's attempt to capture the fort from Bijapur Sultanate
- Siege of Panhala (1694–1696), Mughal attempt to capture the fort from Marathas
- Siege of Panhala (1701), Mughal capture of the fort from Marathas.
