= Siege of Panhala (1701) =

1701 siege in India by the Mughal Empire

- Part of Deccan Wars
Date	January – 28 May 1701
Location	Panhala 16.82°N 74.12°E
Result	Mughal victory
Territorial changes	Panhala and Pavangad annexed by the Mughal Empire

Belligerents
Mughal Empire	Maratha Kingdom

Commanders and leaders
Aurangzeb; Bidar Bakht; Nusrat Jung; Feroze Jung; Tarbiyat Khan; Zulfiqar Khan; Fath-ullah Khan; Hamid-ud-din Khan; Muhammad Murad	Parshuram Trimbak (surrendered); Dhanaji Jadhav; Ramchandra Pant Amatya

Strength
Unknown	10,000 cavalry 2,000 infantry

Casualties and losses
Heavy	Heavy
- Location within Maharashtra Siege of Panhala (India)

The Siege of Panhala in 1701 was a significant military expedition led by Mughal emperor Aurangzeb during his campaign against the Marathas. The fort was under the command of Trimbakji, a Maratha leader who was later supported by Dhanaji Jadhav.

== Background ==
The fort of Panhala and its sister fort Pavangad had been under the possession of Bijapur Sultanate. The fort of Panhala controlled the main access to Shivaji's area. In 1660, Maratha general Shivaji killed the Bijapur general Afzal Khan at Pratabgarh then captured Panhala near Kolhapur, where he was besieged by the Bijapur army under Afzal Khan's son Fazl Khan. In July, Shivaji fled after the fall of nearby Pavangad and Panhala was recaptured when Sultan Ali Adil Shah (r. 1656–1672) sent further reinforcements.

Following Ali Adil Shah's death in 1672, Sultan's four-year-old son succeeded his father Sikander Adil Shah (r. 1672–1686) under Khawas Khan regency. Shivaji sent Annaji Pant to capture Panhala. A Maratha faction under Kondaji Farzand mounted the walls at night took the fortress on 6 March 1673 killing the commander.

== Siege ==
In the autumn of 1700, an advanced Mughal force led by Prince Bidar Bakht was deployed to the region surrounding the forts of Panhala and Pavangad. The prince established his encampment at the base of Panhala, while his lieutenant, Nusrat Jang, initiated a siege at the fort's western Konkan gate.

=== Dhana Jadav's conflicts with Mughals ===
On January 23, Dhana Jadav engaged the Mughal army in a fierce battle near the imperial camp, resulting in heavy losses on both sides. The Mughals entrenched at night. Two days later, upon learning Nusrat Jang was approaching from Panhala, Dhana retreated four miles. Hamid-ud-din pursued, but the Marathas fought while retreating, inflicting significant casualties and drawing the Mughals 22 miles from their camp. Battles continued near Raibagh on the following days. By January 29, Dhana rapidly withdrew, and the Mughal general returned to the Emperor.

On 9 March 1701, Aurangzeb arrived to personally supervise the campaign, overseeing the establishment of a comprehensive encirclement of both forts, which extended over approximately fourteen miles. Tarbiyat Khan, artillery chief, directed trench and gun platform construction, with bombardment reducing five of Panhala's towers by half. Sappers dug a mine under the fort's gate, featuring a chamber for 20 soldiers with ventilation, windows, and musketry ports.

In the rugged terrain around Panhala Fort, Mughal mining efforts progressed slowly as the rainy season loomed. Rivalries among key generals Nusrat Jang and Firuz Jang, as well as Tarbiyat Khan and Fath-ullah Khan hindered coordination. Emperor Aurangzeb tasked Fath-ullah Khan with constructing a mine from Kam Bakhsh’s position, which reached the fort's gate in a month. Tarbiyat Khan, competing, extended his covered lane. However, mutual jealousies among the generals disrupted cooperation, prolonging the siege. Meanwhile, Muhammad Murad, a minor officer from Godra, Gujarat, gained Aurangzeb's favor by independently recruiting 500 cavalry, despite his superior's obstruction, and contributed significantly to the campaign.

=== Muhammad Murad's assault on Pavangad ===
Muhammad Murad, tasked with attacking Pavangad Fort, pursued enemy forces to a hilltop between Panhala and Pavangad, where he planted his flag and requested reinforcements, planks, and trenching tools to hold the position. Aurangzeb personally ordered generals Ruhullah and Hamid-ud-din to assist, but they refused, deeming Murad's advance reckless and claiming support was impossible. After a day of fruitless messaging, Ruhullah reported the hilltop untenable, warning of potential enemy night attacks. Aurangzeb censured Murad, and courtiers who initially praised him turned to criticism. The next day, Aurangzeb praised Murad in audience but urged Tarbiyat Khan to assault the fort. Tarbiyat Khan sarcastically deferred to Murad, highlighting ongoing rivalries. Several failed escalade attempts followed, and the siege stalled for two months with no progress.

=== Maratha efforts to lift the siege ===
Nusrat Jang pursued Dhana Jadav, driving him back after an attack beyond Chikkodi, then retreated to Panhala. Dhana resumed operations, sending Krishna Malhar with 10,000 horsemen to raid near Panhala, targeting Mughal supply lines, while he attempted to intercept Mughal artillery at Kararabad. Krishna Malhar attacked Khatau, and Ramchandra and Dado Malhar fought in Konkan against Siddi Yaqut of Danda Rajpuri. On February 4, an infantry of 2,000 escorting provisions to Panhala, was attacked by Nusrat Jang, losing men and supplies but reaching the fort by February 24. Dhana, elusive and pursued by Nusrat Jang, moved between Sinhagarh and Mughal territories, sending 15,000 men under Dado Malhar to raid Mughal territories. On April 20, Ranuji approached Panhala with 20,000 men, while Baharji was captured.

=== Bribe and surrender of the forts ===
Following heavy losses from a mine explosion and a failed assault at Satara, the Mughal army's morale plummeted during the siege of Panhala. Although two mines were completed at Panhala, the generals hesitated to detonate them, as soldiers refused to storm the breach or expose themselves to enemy fire. Facing impending rains and significant expenditures of time, money, and effort on mining and bombardment, Emperor Aurangzeb resorted to bribery. Through Tarbiyat Khan, secret negotiations secured a large payment to Trimbak Rao, the fort's qiladar, who surrendered Panhala and Pavangarh on 28 May 1701, allowing the garrison to leave with their lives and property. English ambassador Sir William Norris witnessed the event.

== Aftermath ==
Aurangzeb left on May 29, 1701, for Khatau, but a cyclone devastated the camp, destroying tents and exposing the army. When Trimbak Rao met Ramchandra, the royal minister at Vishalgarh, he was accused of treachery for betraying his master. Trimbak defended himself, citing a lack of artillery munitions and neglect from his superiors, but was imprisoned for his actions.

== See also ==
- Siege of Panhala (1660)
- Siege of Panhala (1694–1696)

== Bibliography ==
- Jaques, Tony (30 November 2006). Dictionary of Battles and Sieges: A Guide to 8,500 Battles from Antiquity through the Twenty-first Century [3 volumes]. Bloomsbury Publishing USA. ISBN 978-0-313-02799-4.
- Sarkar, Jadunath (1924). History of Aurangzib The Closing Years, 1689-1707. Vol. V. Calcutta: M. C. Sarkar & Sons.
- Gordon, Stewart (1 February 2007). The Marathas 1600-1818. Cambridge University Press. ISBN 978-0-521-03316-9.
- Sardesai, Govind Sakharam (1946). New History of the Marathas: Shivaji and his line (1600-1707. Phoenix Publications. Archived from the original on 16 January 2017.
