= Teli (disambiguation) =

Teli can refer to:

- Teli, caste traditionally occupied in the pressing of oil in India, Nepal and Pakistan
- Muslim Teli, ethnic group found in Pakistan and India
- Gangu Teli, historical or apocryphal figure from the era of the Parmara dynasty of central India
- Admir Teli, Albanian retired professional footballer
- Xu Teli, politician of the People's Republic of China
