= Siege of Panhala (1660) =

1660 siege in India between the Maratha Empire and Bijapur Sultanate

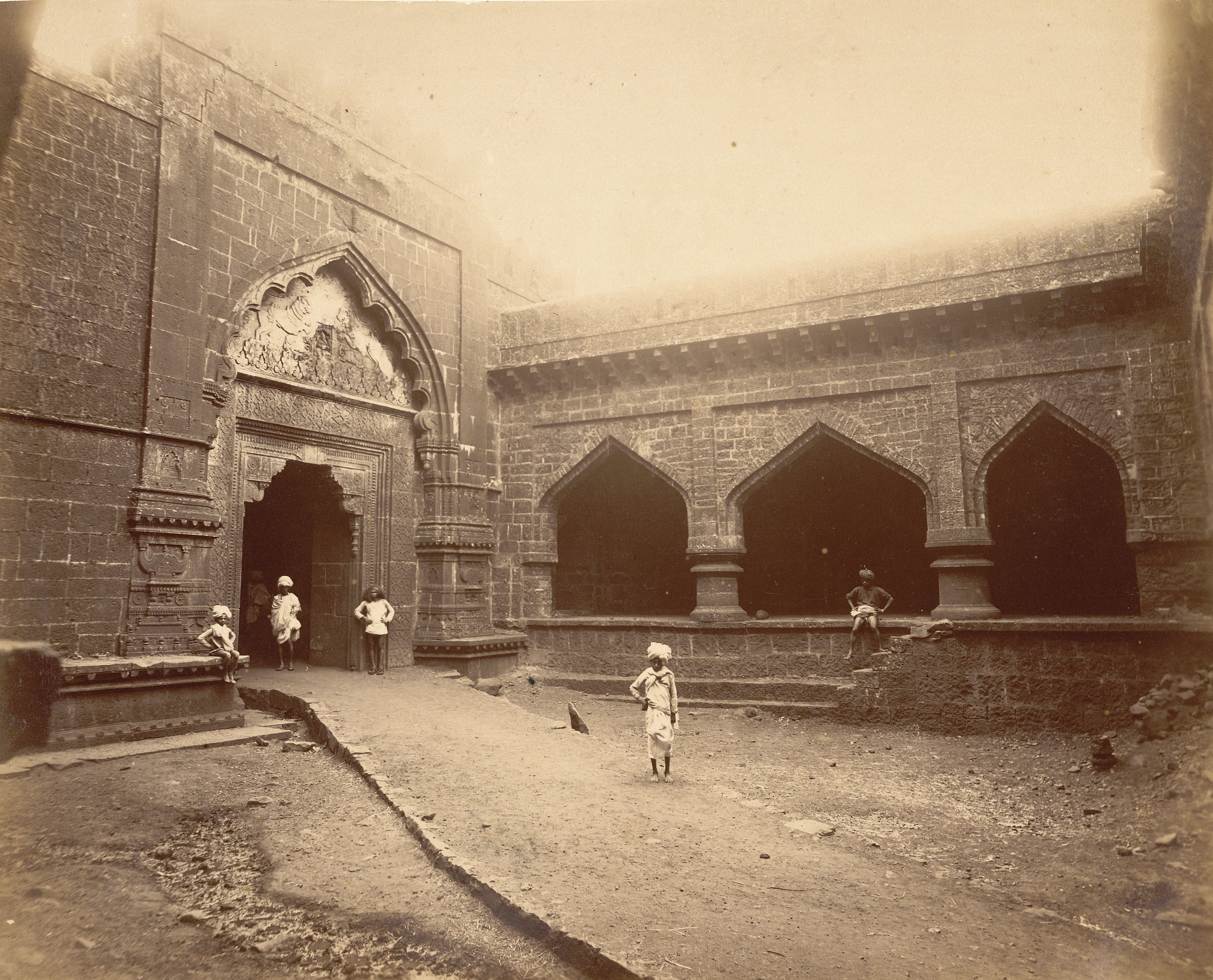
Date	22 September 1660 A.D.
Location	Panhala 16.82°N 74.12°E
Result	Bijapur Sultanate victory
Territorial changes	Panhala and Pavangad added to territory of Bijapur Sultanate

Belligerents
Maratha Kingdom	Bijapur Sultanate

Commanders and leaders
Shivaji (surrendered); Shiva Kashid †; Kadtoji Gujar; Siddi Hilal (surrendered); Netaji Palkar (surrendered); Baji Prabhu Deshpande †	Siddi Jauhar; Fazl Khan; Sidi Yaqub

Units involved
3,000 Cavalry; 5,000 Infantry	10,000–15,000 Cavalry
- Location within Maharashtra Siege of Panhala (1660) (India) Siege of Panhala (1660) (South Asia)

The siege of Panhala was led by Siddi Jauhar on behalf of the Bijapur Sultanate, dispatched by Ali Adil Shah II to reclaim the Panhala Fort, was a momentous undertaking. Shivaji had seized Panhala on 28 November 1659, just 18 days after the death of Afzal Khan at Pratapgad. Despite the efforts of two of Bijapur Sultanate’s prominent commanders, Afzal Khan and Rustam Zaman, who had both failed in their attempts to capture Shivaji, victory eluded them. With Bijapur running short of options and facing the expanding influence of Shivaji, the responsibility of bringing this campaign to a conclusion fell on Siddi Jauhar. By taking on this pivotal role, Siddi Jauhar finally earned favor at the Bijapur court, leading to the restoration of the Kurnool district to him, and Shivaji had to surrender the Panhala fort.

== Background ==
Sidi Jauhar's forces were constantly on edge, never knowing when Netaji Palkar and his cavalry would strike next. The siege of Panhala became a test of endurance for both sides, with Shivaji's men fighting bravely to defend their fortress. Despite the relentless attacks by Netaji Palkar, Sidi Jauhar remained determined to capture Panhala. He ordered his troops to launch a full-scale assault on the fort. Shivaji and his men fought valiantly, but they were outnumbered and outgunned. The Bijapur forces managed to breach the defenses and enter the fort. In the midst of the chaos, Shivaji made a strategic retreat, leaving Panhala in the hands of the enemy. It was a bitter blow to his forces, but he knew that the war was far from over. As Sidi Jauhar celebrated his victory, Shivaji was already planning his next move to reclaim what was rightfully his. The fall of Panhala was a setback for Shivaji, but it only fueled his determination to continue fighting for his people's freedom. The war with Bijapur was far from over, and Shivaji was ready to do whatever it took to ensure the safety and prosperity of his kingdom. The battle for Panhala was just one chapter in the long and complex history of Shivaji's struggle for independence.

== The siege ==
The siege initiated by Siddi Jauhar involved blocking all escape routes for Shivaji, prompting Netaji to conduct nightly attacks on Jauhar's army to safeguard Shivaji from harm. Eventually, Shivaji managed to escape from Panhala with his family and reach Vishalgad, but he was pursued by Fazl Khan, the son of Afzal Khan who had died in the Battle of Pratapgarh. Fazl Khan, fueled by anger and seeking revenge, began plundering and devastating Shivaji's possessions in the Konkan region. He successfully captured the Pavangad fort after a relentless campaign.

== Aftermath ==
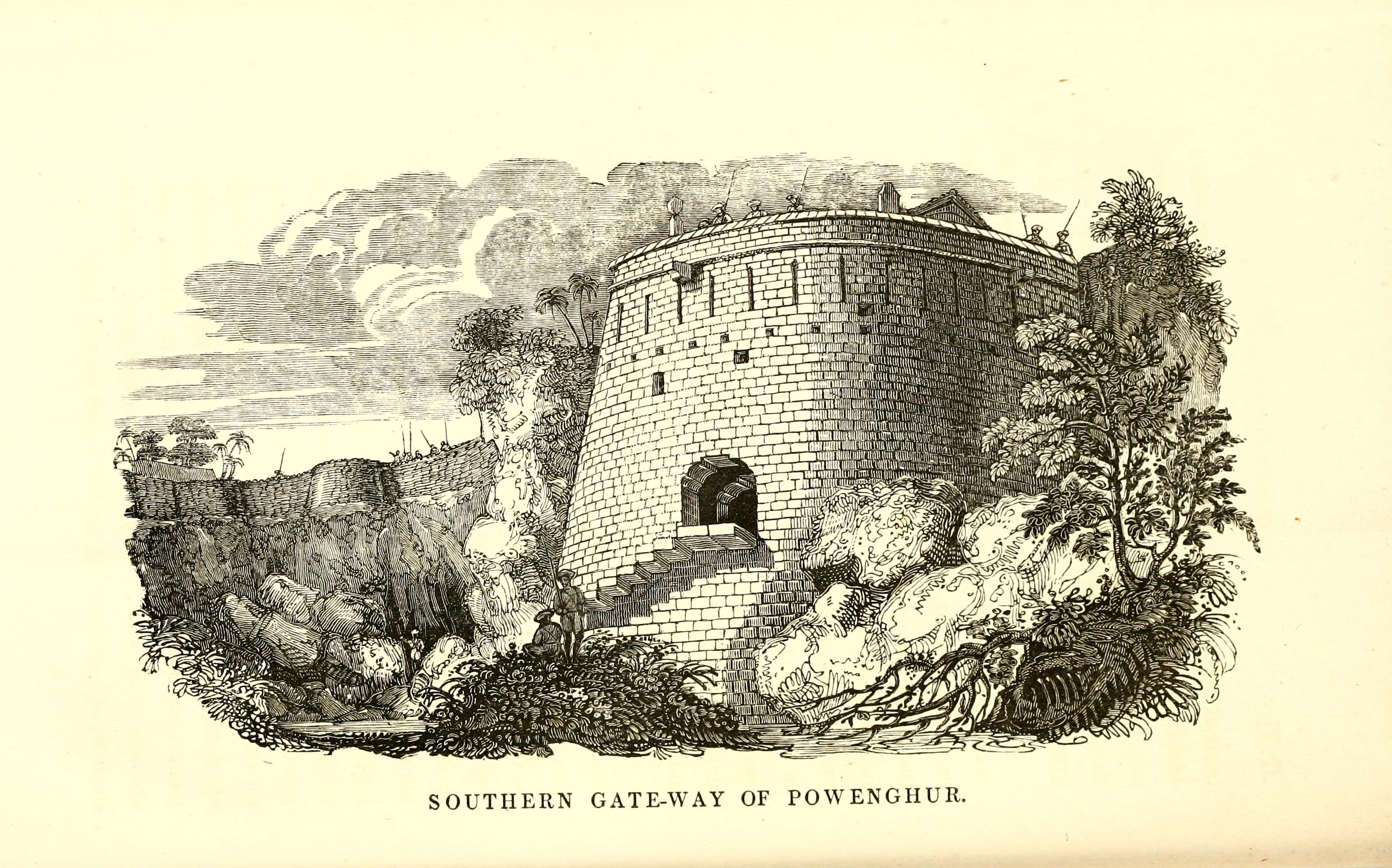
Pavangad Fort captured by Fazl khan.

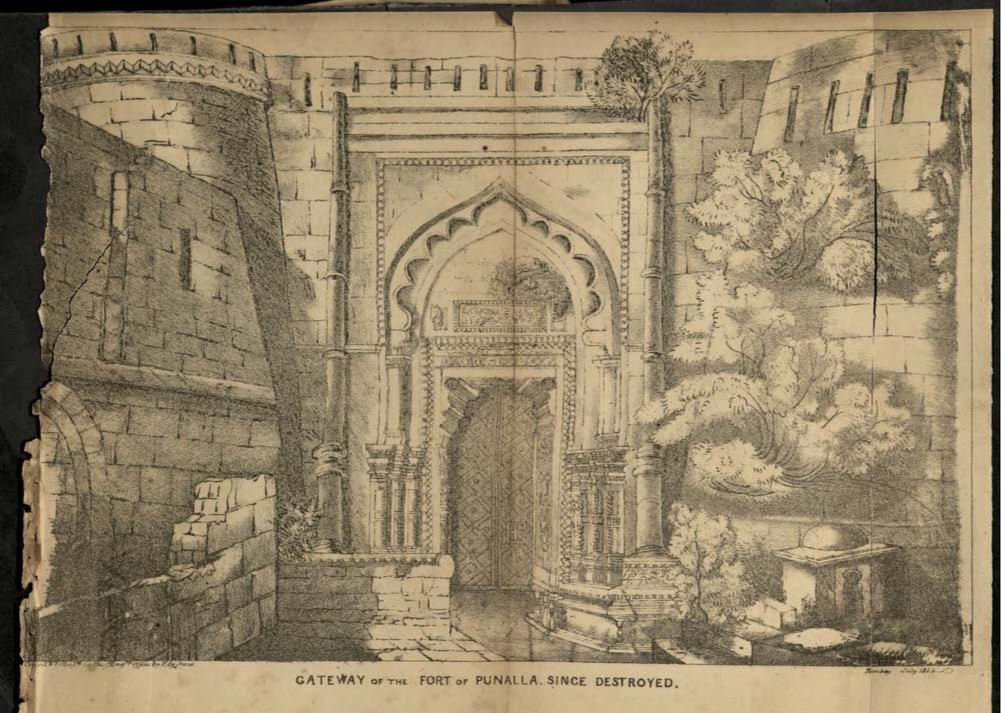
Panhala Fort

Following the defeat of the Marathas, all remaining Maratha soldiers within the fort were massacred. Shivaji, acknowledging the situation, approached Siddi Jauhar and surrendered Panhala to the Adil Shahi army. Furthermore, Fazl Khan's successful capture of the Pavangad fort resulted in its incorporation into the Adil Shahi territory. This notable siege was orchestrated under the leadership of Ali Adil Shah II, aimed at reclaiming the territories lost during the Battle of Pratapgarh. The siege culminated in great success, leading to the recapture of significant Adil Shahi dynasty territories. However, Shivaji recaptured the Panhala fort in 1673.

== See also ==
- Siege of Panhala (1694-96)
- Siege of Panhala (1701)
