= Panhala Fort =

Medieval fort in Maharashtra, India

Panhala fort
- Panhala Maharashtra
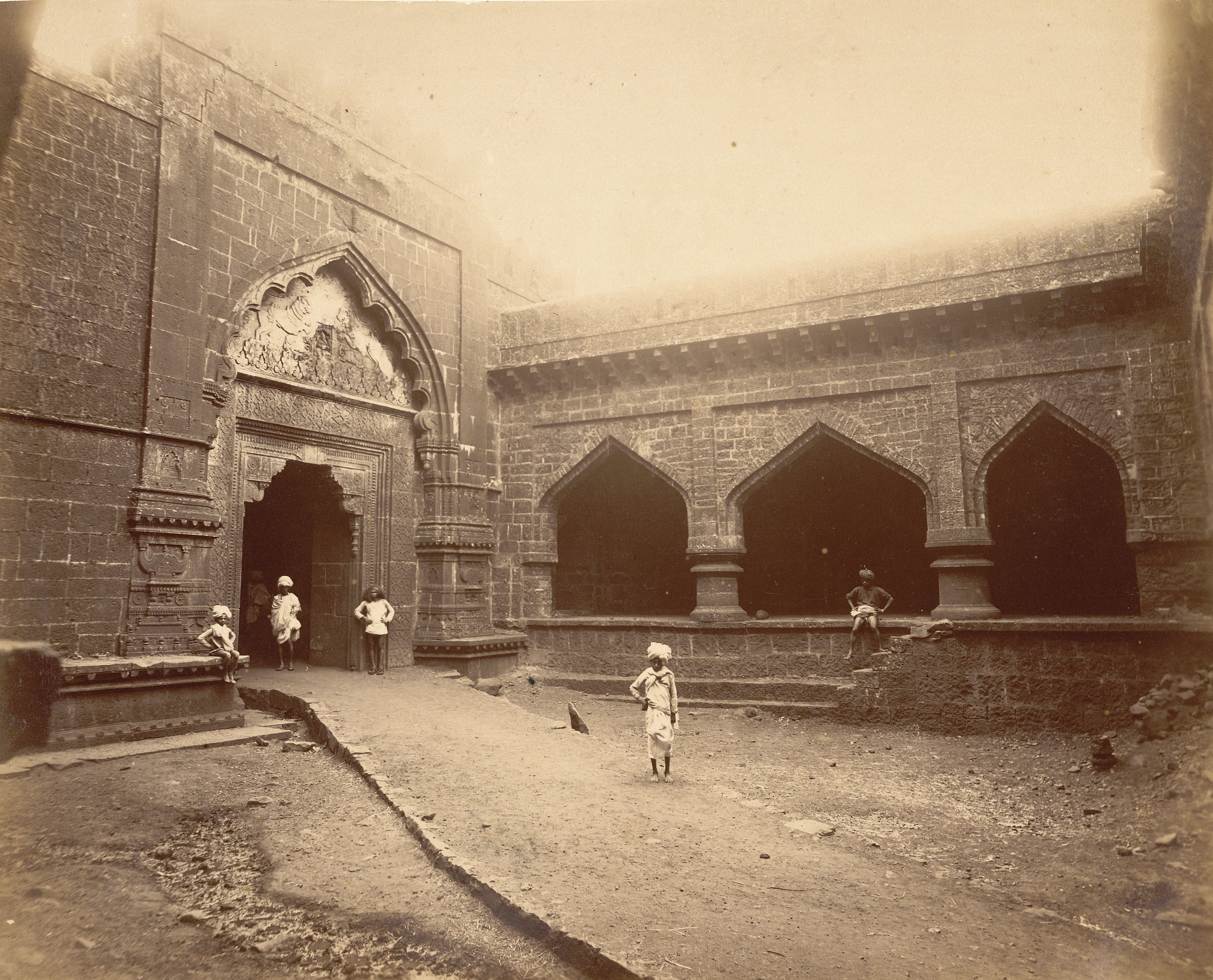
- Inner gate of Teen darwaza of Panhala fort, c. 1894

Site information
- Type: Hill fort
- Owner: Government of India
- Controlled by: Shilahara, Yadavas, Bijapur, Marathas, Mughals, East India Company
- Open to the public: Yes

Location
- Shown within Maharashtra
- Coordinates: 16°48′32″N 74°06′33″E
- Height: 845 m (2,772 ft) ASL

Site history
- Built: 1178–1209 (construction); 1489–1557 (expansion)
- Built by: Bhoja II, Ibrahim Adil Shah I
- In use: 1178–1947
- Materials: Stone, Lead
- Battles/wars: Battle of Pavan Khind

Garrison information
- Past commanders: Bhoja II, Ibrahim Adil Shah I, Shivaji I, Aurangzeb, Tarabai
- Occupants: Sambhaji I, Ramchandra Pant Amatya

UNESCO World Heritage Site
- Part of: Maratha Military Landscapes of India
- Criteria: Cultural: iv, vi
- Reference: 1739-009
- Inscription: 2025 (47th Session)

Panhala fort (also known as Panhalgad and Panhalla (literally "the home of serpents")), is located in Panhala, 20 kilometres northwest of Kolhapur in Maharashtra, India. It is strategically located, looking over a pass in the Western Ghats which was a major trade route from Bijapur in the interior of Maharashtra to the coastal areas. Due to its strategic location, it was the centre of several skirmishes in the Deccan involving the Maratha Empire, Mughal Empire and British, the grandsons of Shivaji, East India Company, the most notable battle being the Battle of Pavan Khind. Here, the queen regent of Kolhapur, Tarabai, spent her formative years. Several parts of the fort and the structures within are still intact. It is also called as the 'Fort of Snakes' as it is zigzagged in shape.

== History ==
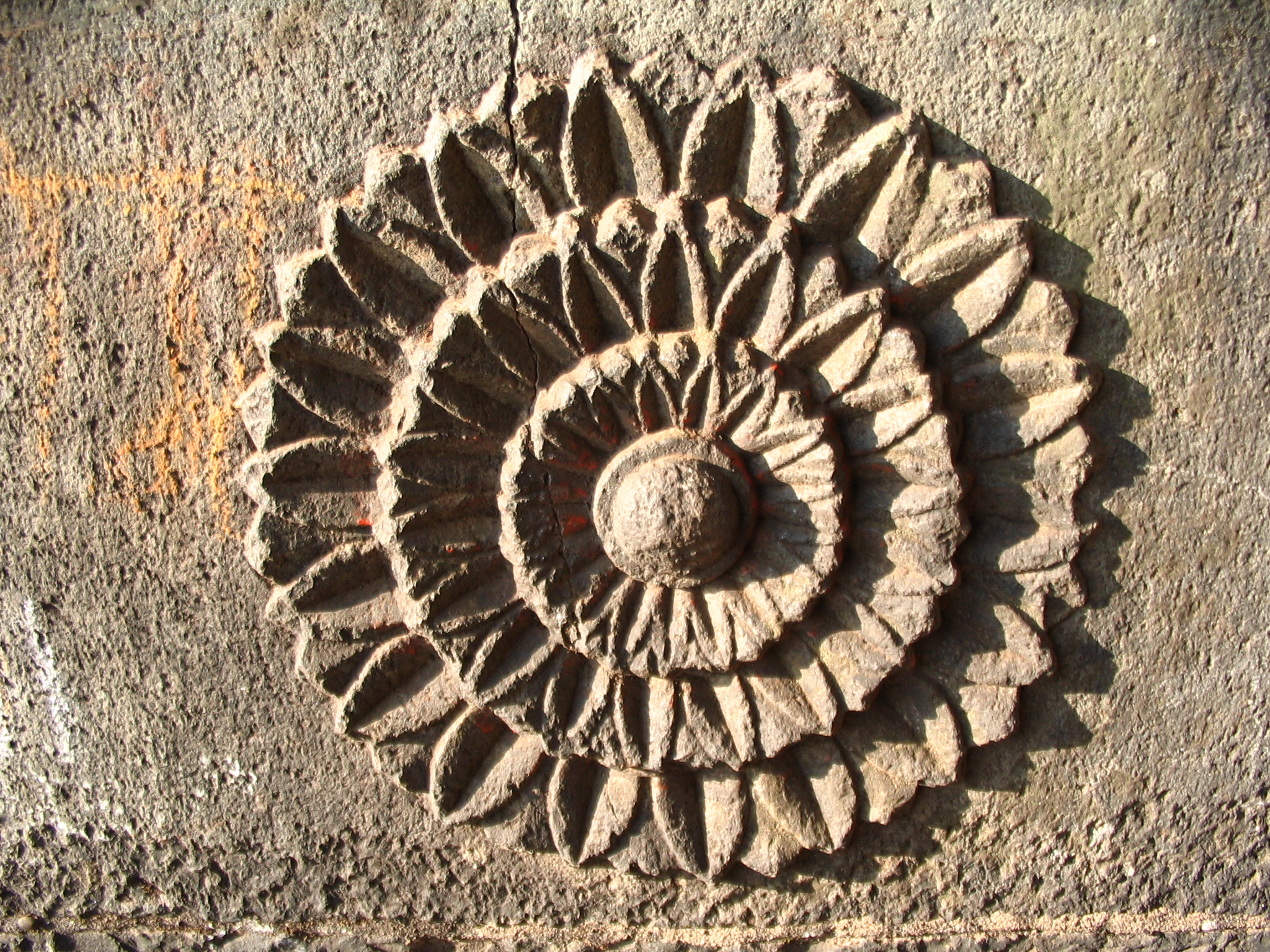
Lotus motif on Panhala of Raja Bhoj, who built the fort

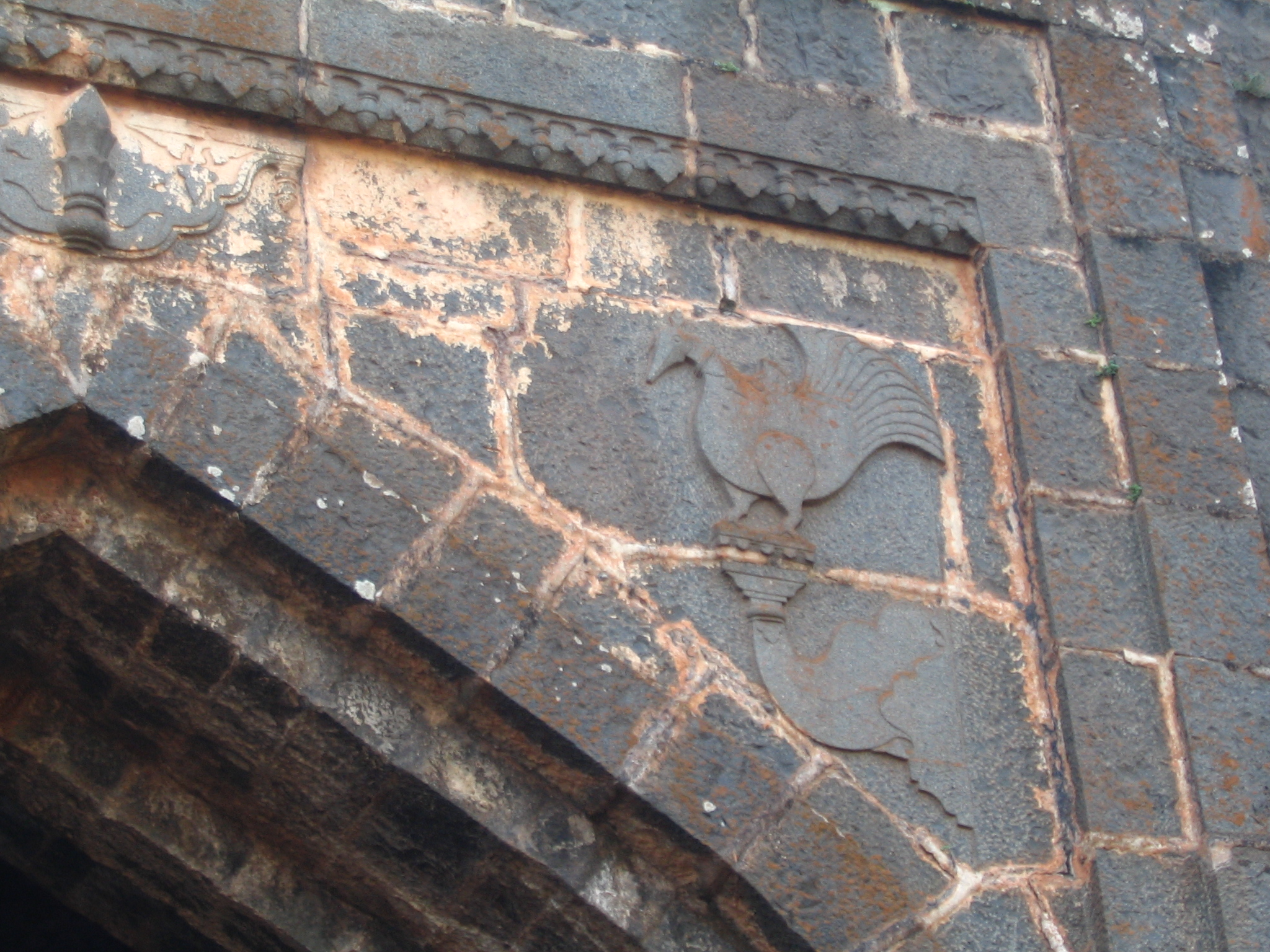
Peacock motif on Panhala fort of the Sultanate of Bijapur

Panahala fort was built between 1178 and 1209 CE, one of 15 forts (others including Gaganbawada, Bhudargad, Ajinkyatara, and Vishalgad) built by the Shilahara dynasty ruler Bhoja II. It is said that aphorism Kahaan Raja Bhoj, kahan Gangu Teli is associated with this fort. A copper plate found in Satara shows that Raja Bhoja held court at Panhala from 1191–1192 CE. About 1209–10, Bhoja Raja was defeated by Singhana (1209–1247), the most powerful of the Devgiri Yadavas, and the fort subsequently passed into the hands of the Yadavas. Apparently it was not well looked after and it passed through several local chiefs. In 1376 inscriptions record the settlement of Nabhapur to the south-east of the fort.

It was an outpost of the Bahmani Kingdom of Bidar. Mahmud Gawan, an influential prime minister, encamped here during the rainy season of 1469. On the establishment of the Sultanate of Bijapur in 1489, Panhala came under Bijapur and was fortified extensively. They built the strong ramparts and gateways of the fort which, according to tradition, took a hundred years to build. Numerous inscriptions in the fort refer to the reign of Ibrahim Adil Shah I, probably Ibrahim I (1534–1557).

=== Under Chhatrapati Shivaji Maharaj ===
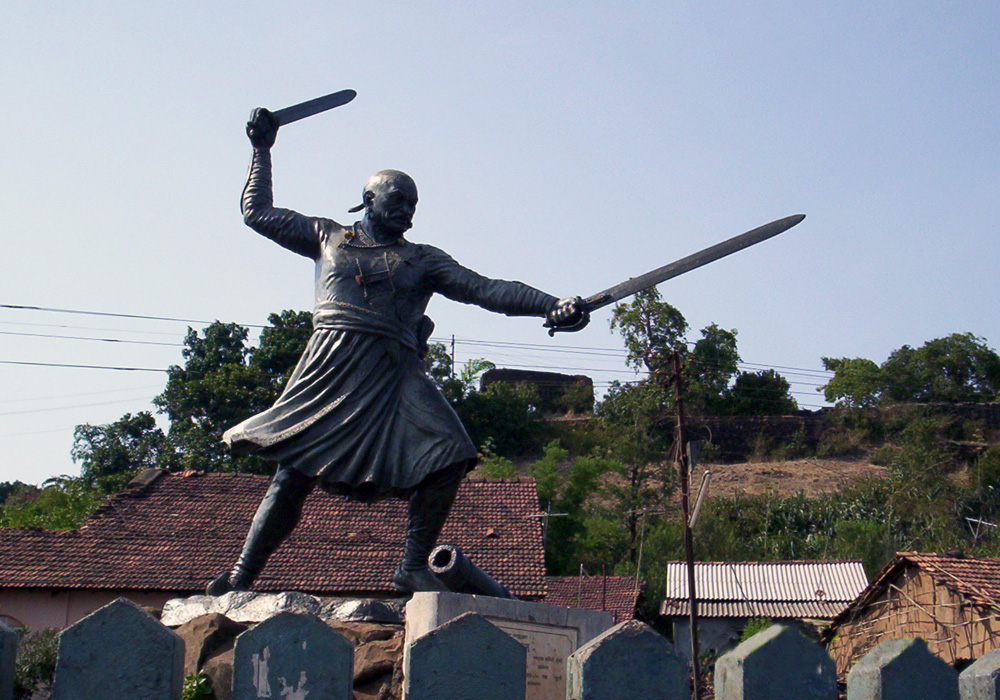
Statue of Baji Prabhu Deshpande at Panhala

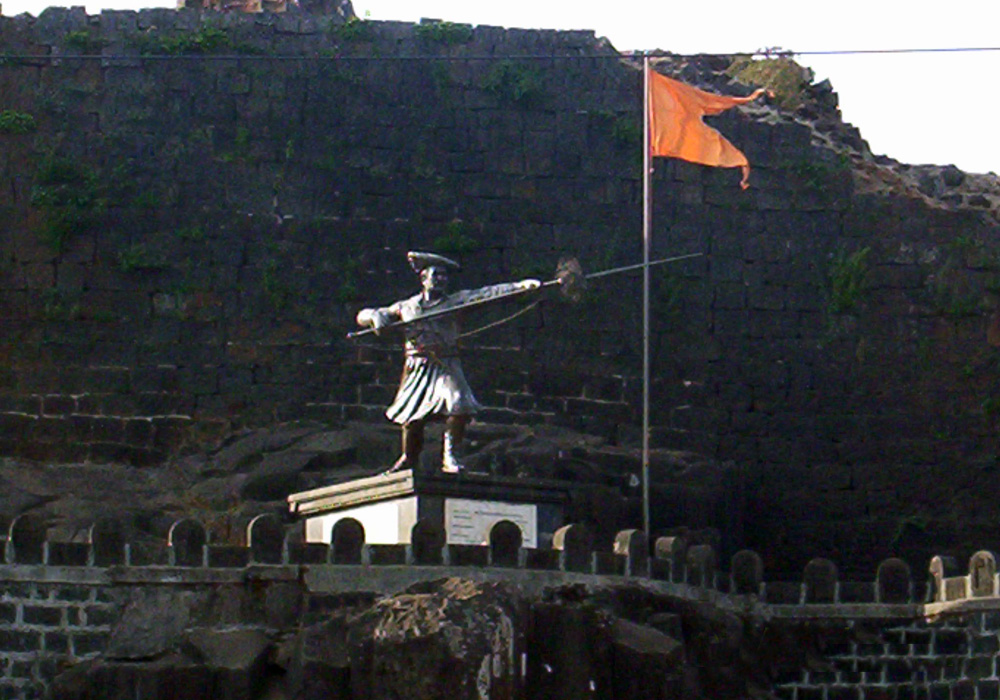
Statue of Veer Shiva Kashid at Panhala fort

In 1659, after the death of the Bijapur general Afzal Khan, in the ensuing confusion Shivaji took Panhala from Bijapur. In May 1660, to win back the fort from Chhatrapati Shivaji Maharaj, Adil Shah II (1656–1672) of Bijapur sent his army under the command of Siddi Johar to lay siege to Panhala. Chhatrapati Shivaji Maharaj fought back and they could not take the fort. The siege continued for 5 months, at the end of which all provisions in the fort were exhausted and Chhatrapati Shivaji Maharaj was on the verge of being captured.

Under these circumstances, Chhatrapati Shivaji Maharaj decided that escape was the only option. He gathered a small number of soldiers along with his trusted commander Baji Prabhu Deshpande and, on 13 July 1660, they escaped in the dead of night to flee to Vishalgad. Baji Prabhu and a barber, Shiva Kashid, who looked like Shivaji, kept the enemy engaged, giving them an impression that Shiva Kashid was actually Chhatrapati Shivaji Maharaj. In the ensuing battle (see Battle of Pavan Khind), almost three quarters of the one thousand strong force died, including Baji Prabhu himself. The fort went to Adil Shah. It was not until 1673 that Chhatrapati Shivaji Maharaj could occupy it permanently.

Sambhaji, Shivaji Maharaj's son and successor to the throne Chhatrapati Shivaji Maharaj met his son after he escaped from the Camp of Diler Khan after executing his father political agenda to bring Aurangzeb's successor over to the Maratha's. He escaped from here along with his wife on 13 December 1678 and attacked Bhupalgad. He returned to Panhala, however, on 4 December 1679 to reconcile with his father just before his father's death on 4 April 1680. At the height of Shivaji's power in 1678, Panhala housed 15,000 horses and 20,000 soldiers. also the main darwaza was chaar darwaza

=== Under the Kolhapur kings ===
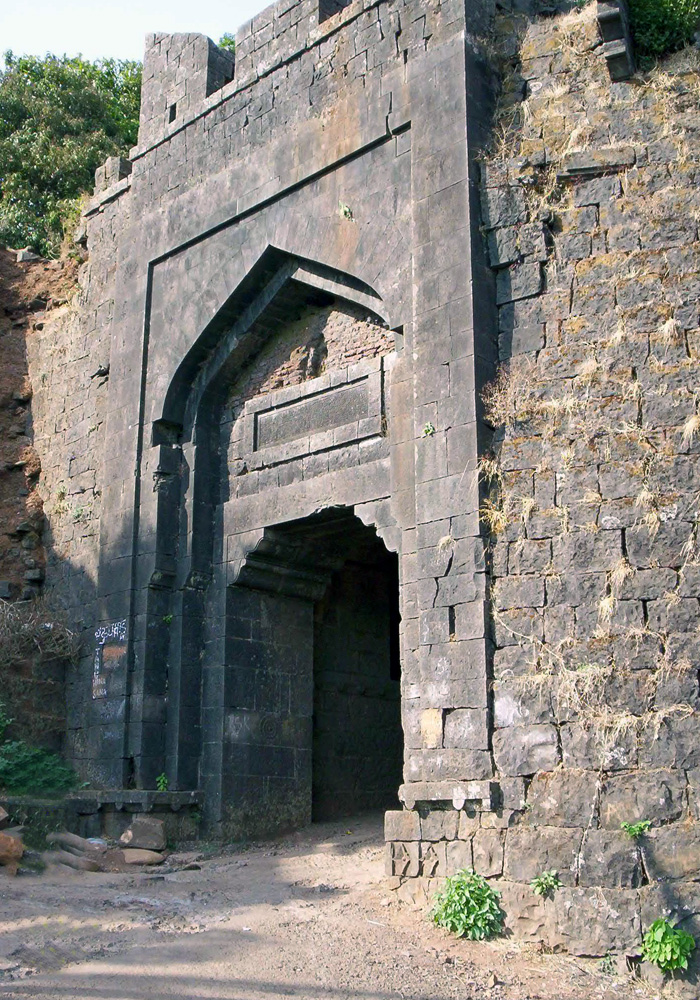
Konkan Darwaja - Another entrance to the fort

When Shivaji died, Sambhaji was able to convince the garrison at Panhala to join him in overthrowing his stepbrother Rajaram I thus becoming the Chhatrapati (king) of the Maratha Empire. In 1689, when Sambhaji was imprisoned by Aurangzeb's general Mukkarab Khan at Sangameshwar, the Mughals came to possess the fort. However, it was re-captured in 1692 by Kashi Ranganath Sarpotdar under the guidance of Parshuram Pant Pratinidhi a Maratha garrison commander of the fort of Vishalgad. In 1701 Panhala finally surrendered to Aurangzeb, who came for it in person. On 28 April 1692 the Mughal Emperor famously received the English ambassador Sir William Norris at Panhala fort. Norris spent "300 pounds in fruitless negotiation" with Aurangzeb but the details of what was being discussed were not disclosed. Within a few months the fort was retaken by the Maratha forces under Ramchandra Pant Amatya.

In 1693, Aurangzeb attacked it again. This led to another long siege in which Rajaram escaped disguised as a beggar to Gingee Fort, leaving his 14-year-old wife Tarabai in Panhala. As Aurangzeb pursued Rajaram, Tarabai would stay at Panhala for almost five years before meeting her husband again. During this formative period of her life, Tarabai looked after the administration of the fort, resolved disputes, and gained the respect of the people. The time she spent at Panhala provided her with experience in courtly matters and the support of her officers, which would influence later events. Rajaram did send reinforcements from Gingee, and Panhala came into Maratha's hands in October 1693.

In 1700, Rajaram I, died leaving behind a 12-year-old son—Shivaji II—by his wife Tarabai. In 1705, Tarabai asserted her autonomy by founding an independent dynasty in the name of her son Shivaji II and ruling it as regent with Panhala as her headquarters. In Tarabai Ranisaheb's war with Shahu I of Satara in 1708, Shahu took Panhala and Tarabai fled to Malvan in Ratnagiri. Shortly after, in 1709, Tarabai again took Panhala, established a separate state (Kolhapur)Rajaram by his second wife Rajasbai Ranisaheb succeeded to the throne. He died without issue in 1760. His widow Jijabai Ranisaheb adopted the son of a Sahaja Bhonsle of Canvas. Thus, Jijabai Ranisaheb became the acting regent during the time that her adopted son was a minor. She came to believe that to prevent the fall of Panhala, the Mahakali shrine at the fort had to be ritually offered human blood for the appeasement of Kali. She would periodically send out her soldiers at night to scour the neighboring villages for victims. This practice would continue until her death in 1772. One of the towers near were these sacrifices occurred is still called the Kali tower. There were reports of Jijabai Ranisaheb bestowing a plot of land to an oilman or Teli in return for the grant of his daughter-in-law to be buried alive under one of the Panhala towers. A shrine to the Teli's daughter-in-law (Gangubai) was subsequently erected and it is still a pilgrimage site for the people of the Teli community.

In 1782, the seat of the Kolhapur government was moved from Panhala to Kolhapur. In 1827, under Shahaji II (1821–1837), Panhala and its neighboring fort Pavangad were given over to the British Raj. In 1844, during the minority of Shivaji IV (1837–1860), Panhala and Pavangad were taken by rebels who seized Colonel Ovans, the Resident of Satara, when he was on tour and imprisoned him in Panhala. A British force under General Delamotte was sent against the rebels and on 1 December 1844 breached the fort wall, took it by storm and dismantled the fortifications. Thereafter, a British garrison was always left to guard the fort. The administration of the fort remained with Kolhapur until 1947.

== Major features ==
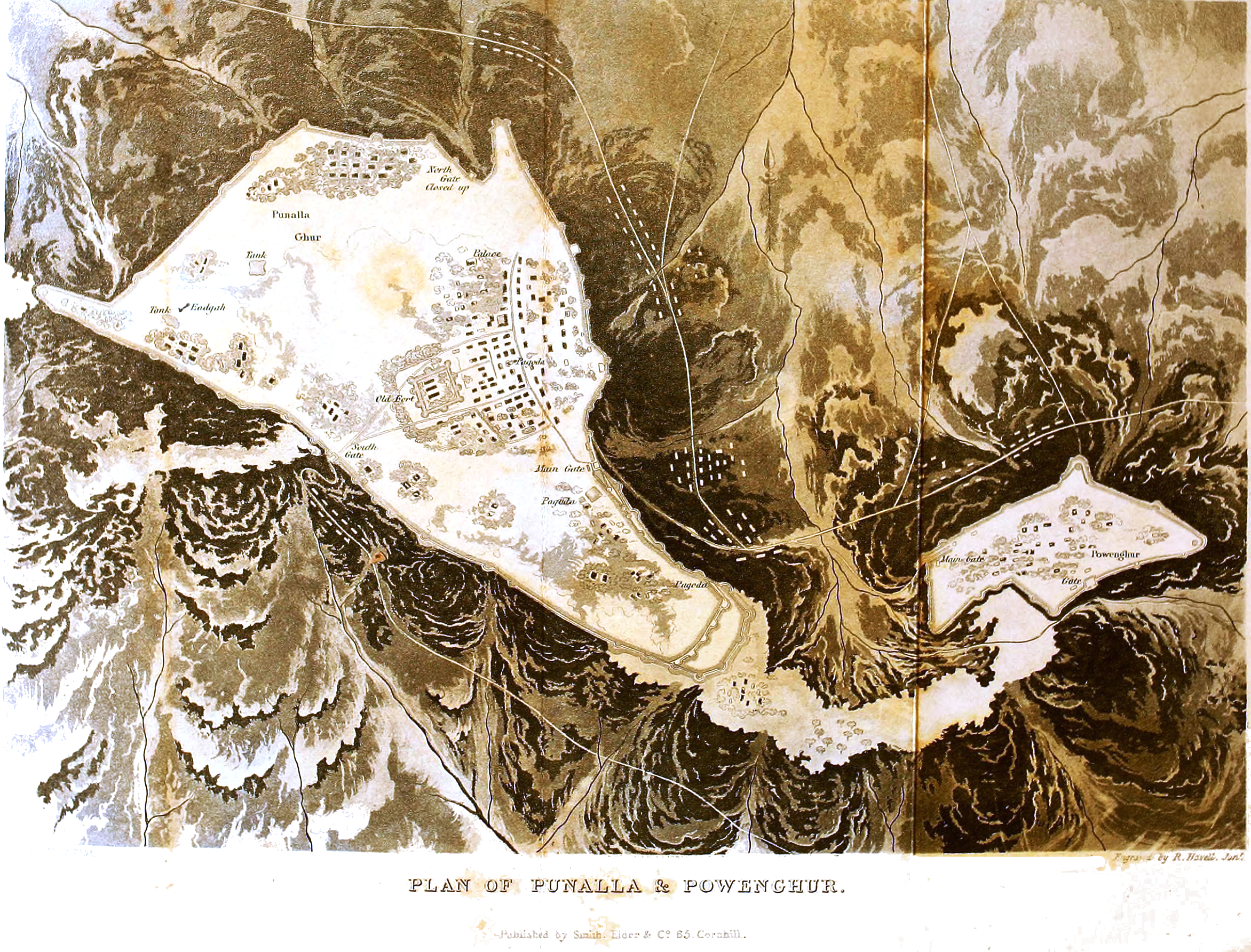
Plan of the fort

It is one of the largest forts in the Deccan, with a perimeter of 14 km (9 mi) and 110 lookout posts. It is 845 m (2,772 ft) above sea level. This fort is built on the Western Ghats, rising more than 400 m (1,312 ft) above its surrounding plain. Numerous tunnels stretch out from underneath the fort, one of which is almost 1 km long. Some of the older bastions have the lotus motif of Bhoja II. There are several monuments at the fort which are considered notable by the Archaeological Survey of India.

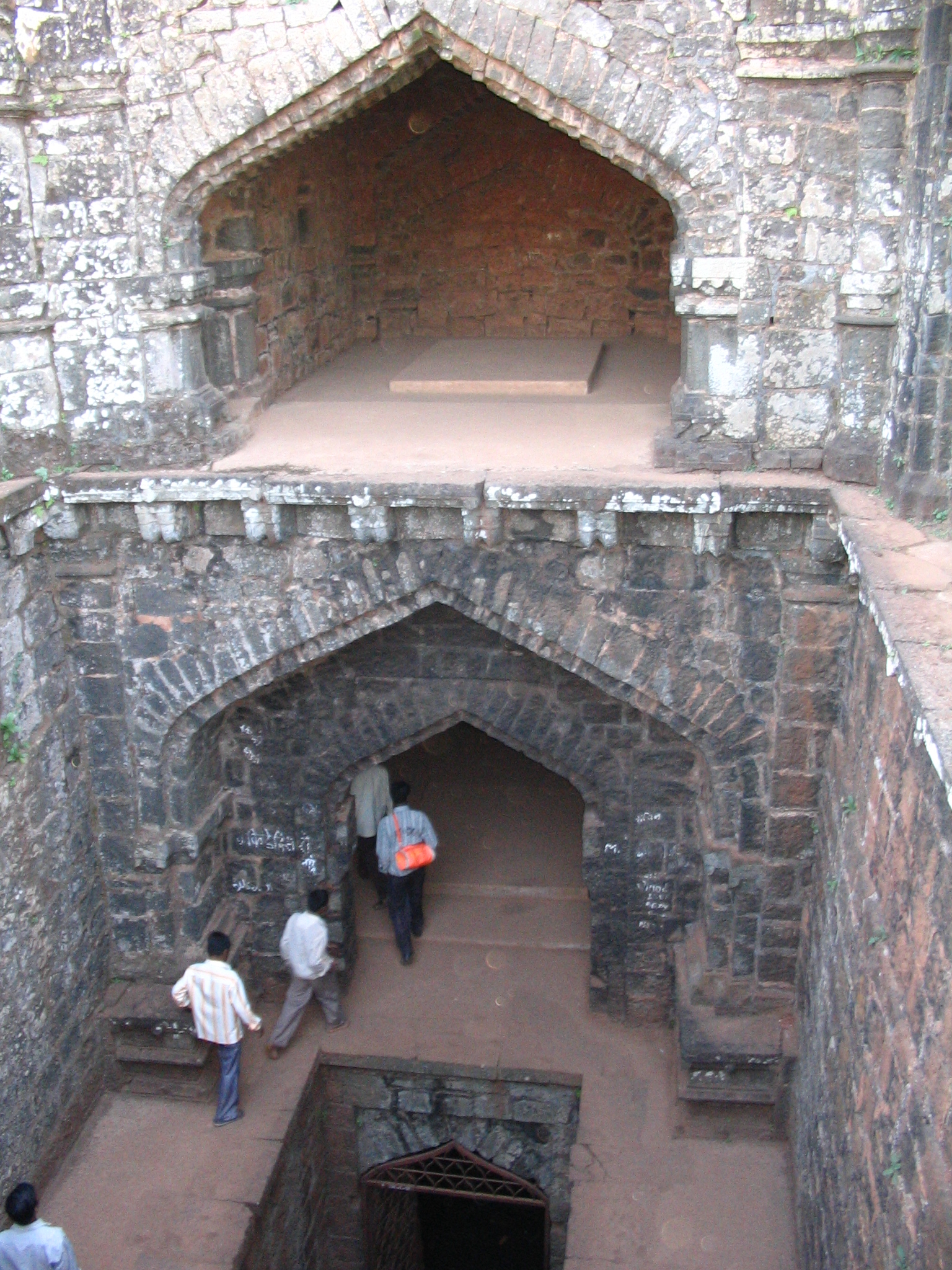
Andhar Bavai - the Hidden Well

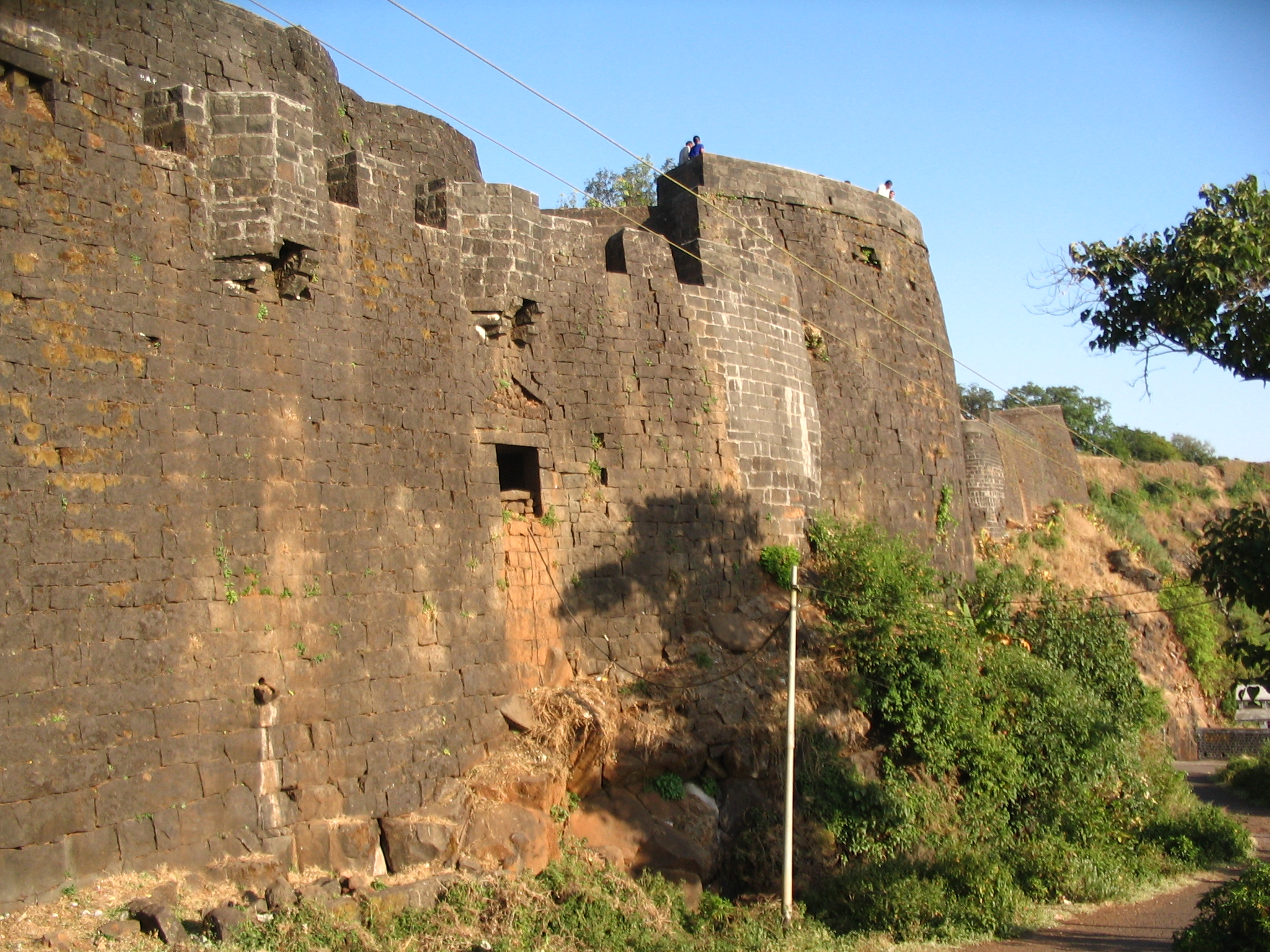
Panhala fortifications (tatabandi)

=== Fortifications and bastions ===
More than 7 km of fortifications (Tatabandi) define the approximately triangular zone of Panhala fort. The walls are protected for long sections by steep escarpments, reinforced by a parapet with slit holes. The remaining sections have 5–9 m (16–30 ft) high ramparts without a parapet, strengthened by round bastions the most notable of which is Rajdindi. (See later section)

=== Andhar Bavadi ===
Whenever an army besieged a fort, their first action was to poison the main water source of the fort. To counter this, Adil Shah commissioned the building of the Andhar Bavadi (Hidden Well). This is a three-storey structure with winding staircases that conceal the well which was the main water source for Panhala fort. There are recesses in the wall so that soldiers can be permanently stationed. Several hidden escape routes in the Andhar Bavai lead outside the fort. With its own water source, living quarters and its own exit routes, likely this structure was designed like a fort within a fort with the intention of making it an emergency shelter in case the main fort fell.

=== Kalavanticha Mahal ===
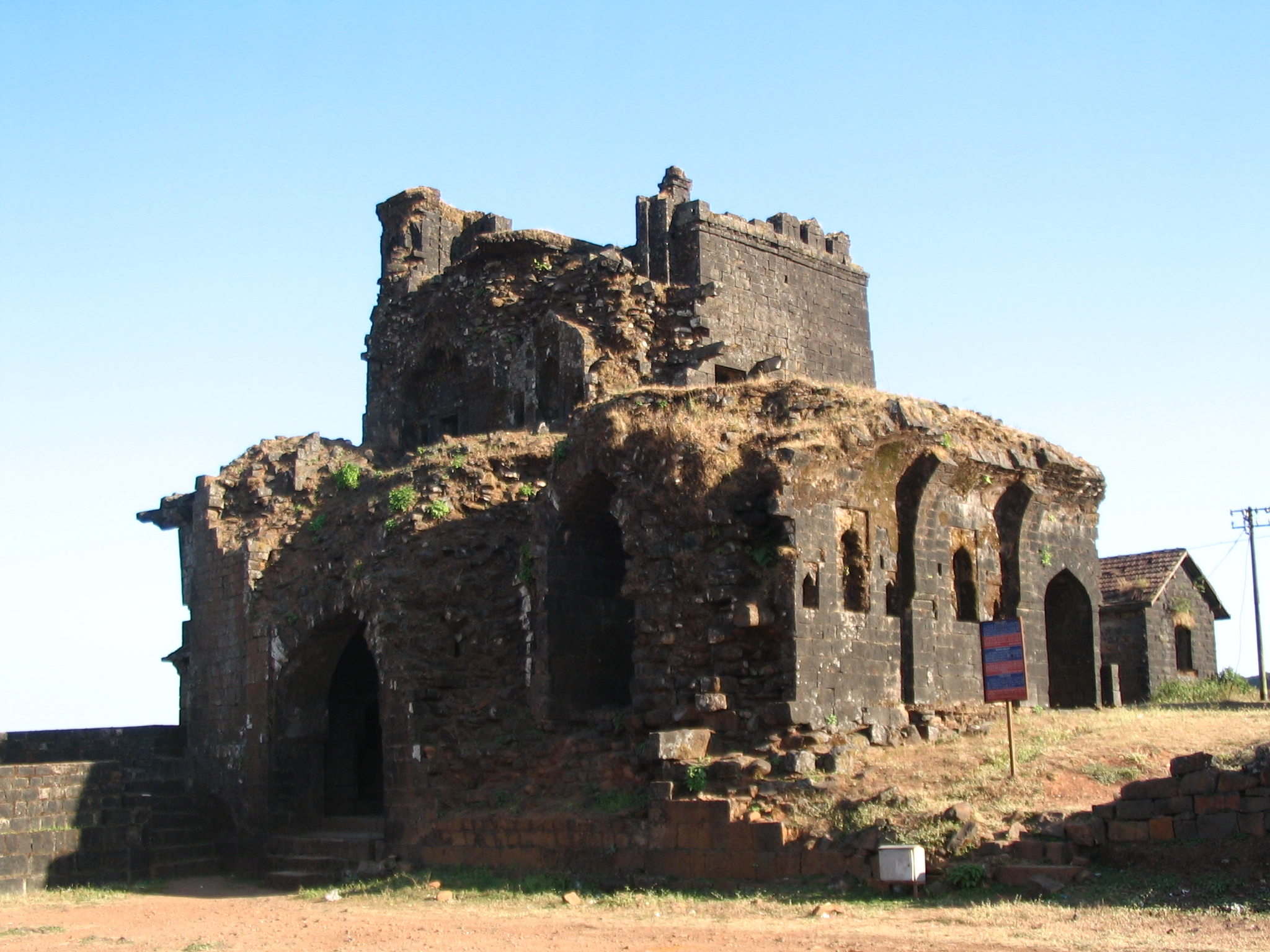
Kalvanticha Mahal (The courtesan's palace)

The name of this building, which is also called Nayakini Sajja, literally means "Courtesans' Terrace room". It stands on the east side of the fort close to the rampart. By 1886, it had become a complete wreck with only traces of ornamental work on the ceiling. This was used during the occupation of the fort by the Bahmani Kingdom as a Rang Mahal(residences for the ladies of the court)

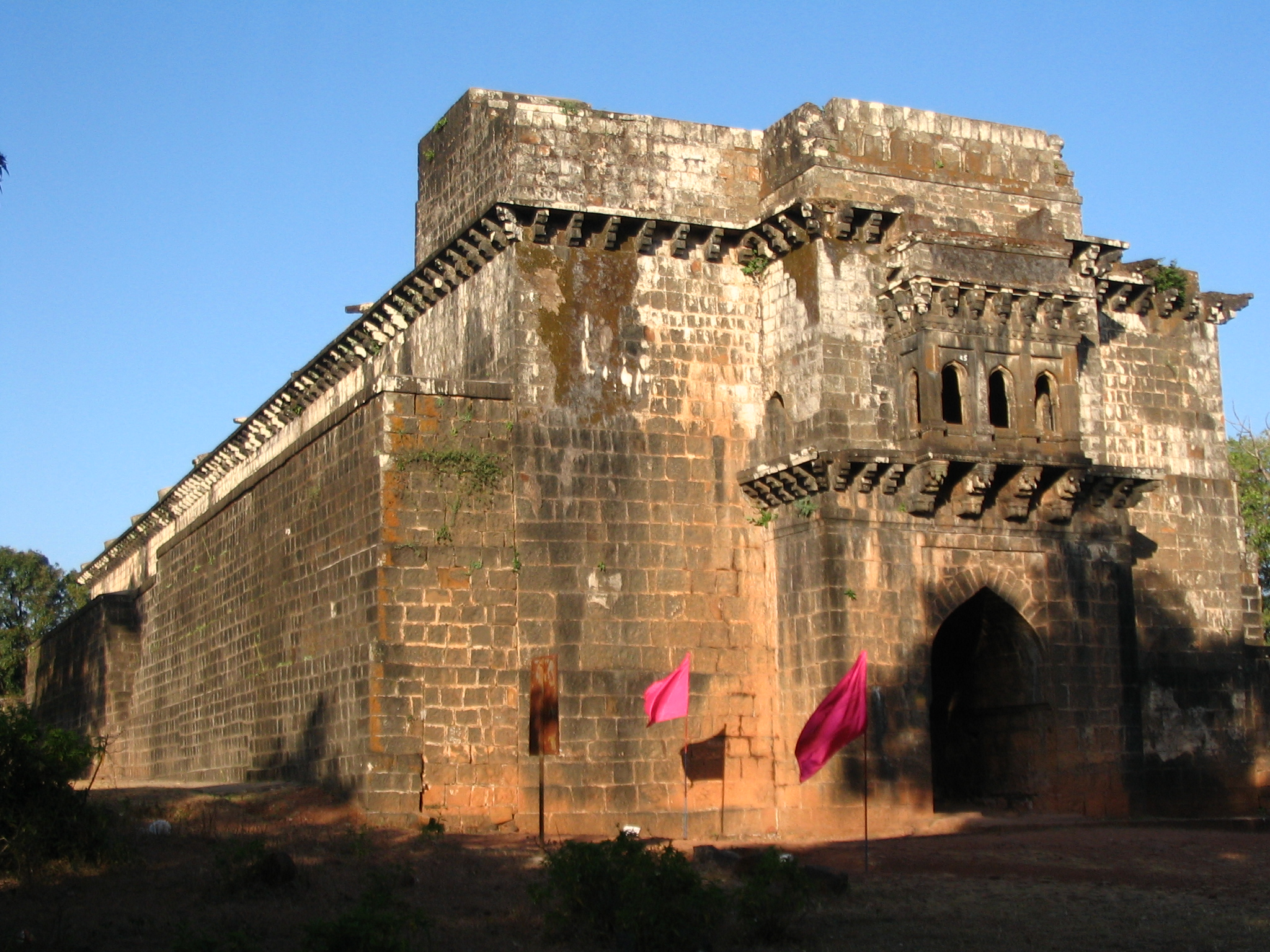
Amberkhana(the granary)

=== Ambarkhana ===
The Amberkhana, situated in the center of the fort, were three granaries built in the Bijapuri style of architecture. They enabled Shivaji to withstand a 5-month siege by Siddhi Johar. It consists of three buildings called the Ganga, Yamuna and Saraswati Kothis. The Ganga kothi, which was the largest, had a capacity of 25,000 khandis (with one khandi being 650 lbs). It covers an area of 950 sq m and is 10.5 m high. Rice, nachni and warai were the major provisions stored. Stairs on both sides lead the top of the buildings. It has sixteen bays each with its own flat vault with a hole on top through which grain used to be passed. The eastern entrance has a domed chamber with a balcony and plasterwork of the Bijapuri style.

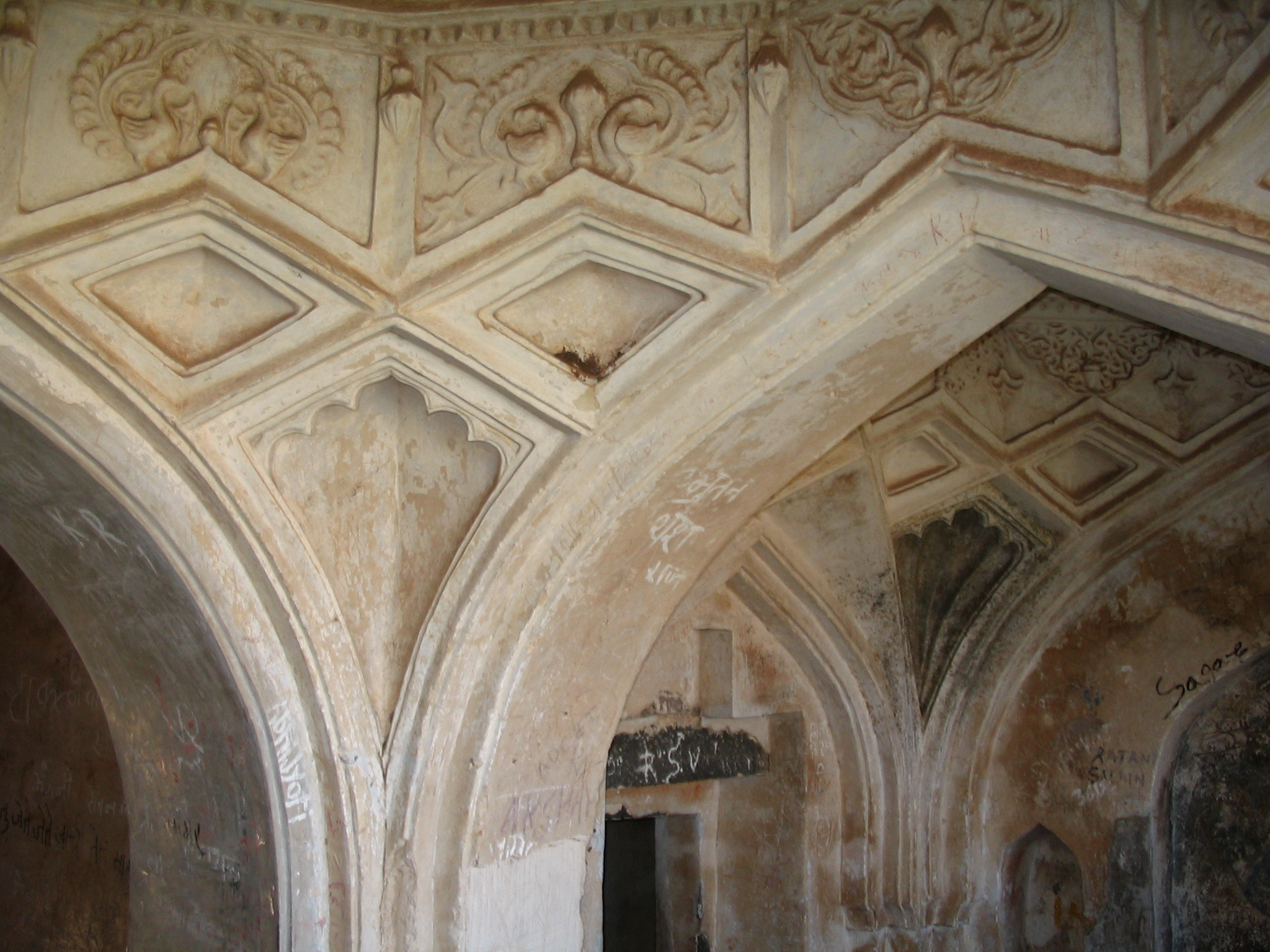
The plasterwork inside Sajja Kothi

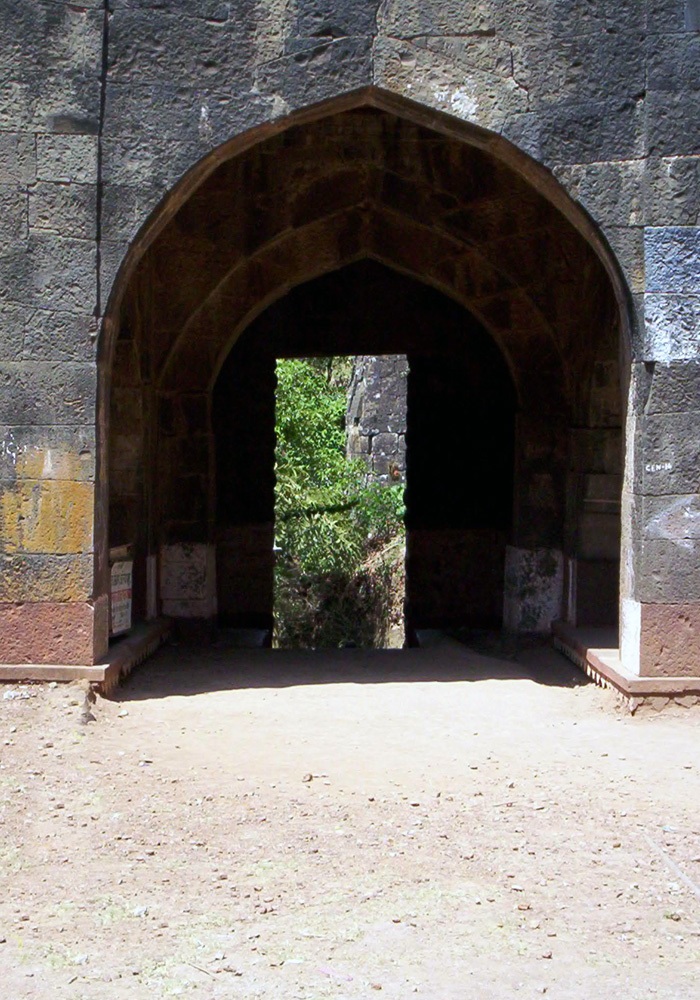
Wagh Darwaza, Panhala

=== Dharma Kothi ===
This was an additional granary next to the three granaries that constituted the Amberkhana. It was a stone building 55 feet by 48 feet by 35 feet high. This has an entrance and a staircase that leads to the terrace. Grain was distributed from here to the needy.

=== Sajja Kothi ===
Sajja Kothi is a one-storey structure built by Ibrahim Adil Shah in 1500 CE. It is also built in the Bijapuri style. Sajja Kothi was constructed as a viewing pavilion looking over the valley below. The domed upper chambers have faceted pendentives with the balconies hanging over the ramparts of the fort.

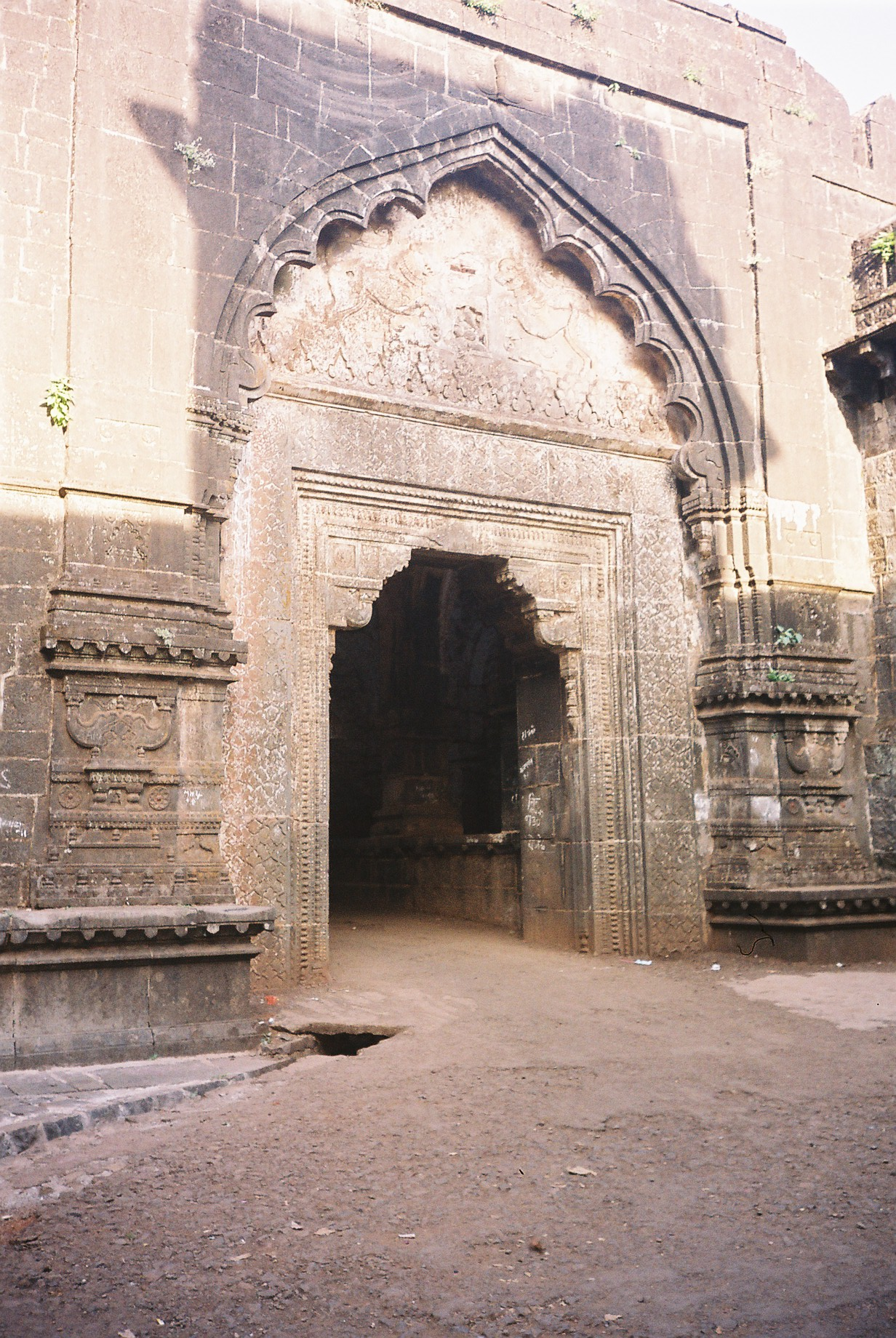
Inner gate of Teen darwaza

=== Teen Darwaza ===
The Teen Darwaza was one of the three double gateways of the fort - the others being the Char Darwaja and Wagh Darwaja. The Char Darwaza was destroyed when during the British siege. The Teen Darwaja gate which is the main entrance to the fort is located north of the Andhar Bavai on the West side of the fort. It is a double gate with a court in between that has arcades. The outer gate has an ornate chamber on top with decorated eaves. The inner gate from the court is highly decorated with the lintel having finely carved motifs, including one of Ganesha. The latter has been placed by the Marathas during their occupation of the fort. There are three Persian inscriptions—one on top and one each on either side. All three declare that the gate "was built in the reign of Ibrahim Adil Shah I by Malik Daud Aki son of Minister Ahmed" in 954 AH (1534 CE).

=== Wagh Darwaza ===
This was another entrance to the fort. It was designed to elude invaders such that they would get trapped into a small courtyard and could then be easily neutralized. It has an elaborate Ganesha motif at the entrance.

=== Rajdindi bastion ===
The Rajdindi bastion was one of the hidden exits of the fort to be used in times of an emergency. It was used by Shivaji to escape to Vishalgad during the Battle of Pavan Khind. Rajdindi is still intact.

=== Temples and mausoleums ===
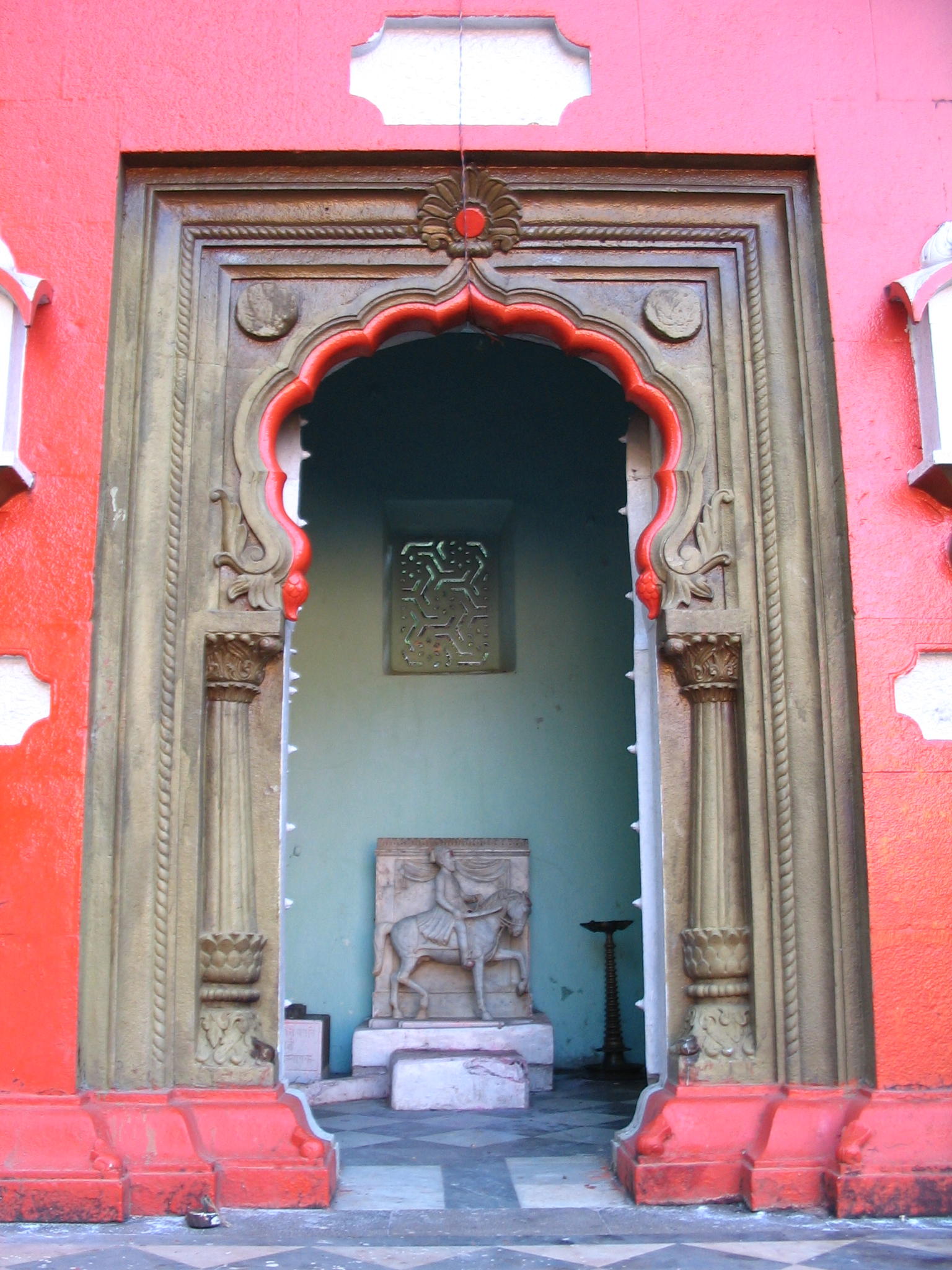
Shivaji temple, Panhala fort

There are temples devoted to Sambhaji II, Someshwar and Ambabai in addition to the Mahakali temple. The Ambabai temple is very old and it was here that Shivaji would make offerings before embarking on major expeditions. The mausoleum of Jijabai lies opposite to that of her husband, Sambhaji II. Ramchandra Pant Amatya (who wrote Adnyapatra, a treatise on Maratha policy) was the youngest minister in Shivaji's fort. He died at Panhala fort and a mausoleum was erected here for him and his wife. The mausoleums were covered with rubble till 1941 and till 1999 had not undergone any restoration work. Also a mausoleum to Moropant an 18th-century Marathi poet who wrote poetry in the adjacent Parashar caves can be seen. A shrine to a Muslim saint Sadhoba is also present.

== Current use ==
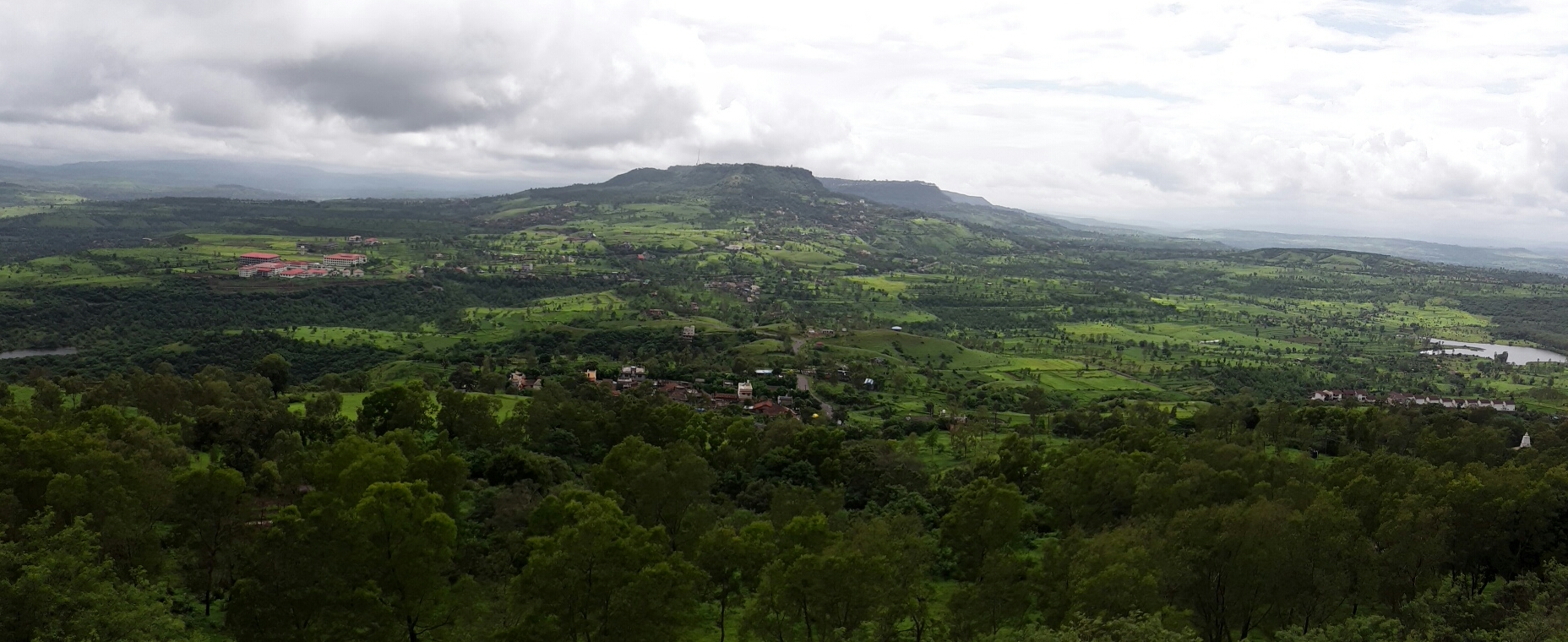
Green Valley of Panhala, a view from Jotiba Ghat Road

The palace of Tarabai, arguably the fort's most famous resident, is still intact. It is now used to house a school, several government offices and a boys' hostel. The rest of the fort is in ruins though the structures within the fort are frequented by tourists who visit Panhala town- a major hill station. It has been declared as a protected monument by the government. The Masai Pathar behind Panhala fort was chosen as an alternative location to shoot Padmaavat film.

== See also ==
- List of forts in Maharashtra
- Baji Prabhu Deshpande
