= Rustam Zaman =

Indian general

Rustam-i-Zaman Rustam Khan
- Monarch: List: Mohammed Adil Shah Ali Adil Shah II

Personal details
- Parent: Randaula Khan (father)

Military service
- Battles/wars: Maratha–Bijapur Wars: Battle of Pratapgarh; Siege of Panhala; Battle of Pavan Khind; Battle of Kolhapur

Rustam Zaman was the title of a Bijapuri general who commanded Adil Shah's 10,000-strong army in the Battle of Kolhapur against Shivaji's forces. Rustam had participated in many wars against the Marathas and their leader Shivaji. One of those battles were Siege of Panhala (1660), Battle of Pavan Khind, Battle of Kolhapur and many more. He also was the son of Ranadulla Khan (who also held the title Rustam-i-Zaman), an experienced and senior general of Bijapur and the chief mentor and guardian of Shahaji.

== Reign ==
He participated in the war against the Marathas under Afzal Khan. He was routed but he was allowed to go back to Bijapur by Nur Khan Beg and Tanaji Malusare, military commanders of Shivaji.

He led the 10,000-strong Bijapuri army against the 3500 light cavalry of Marathas at Kolhapur. Due to the superior use of flanks by Shivaji, the Marathas won the battle and Rustam Zaman and Fazal Khan fled to Bijapur. It is said that in this battle Shivaji used same tactics which Babur used against Rana Sanga of Mewar.

== In popular culture ==
=== Films and television ===
- In the 2011-2012 Indian historical TV serial Veer Shivaji, he is portrayed by Alok Narula.
- In the 2022 Marathi-language Indian historical film Pawankhind, he is portrayed by Rishi Saxena.
