= Chimnaji Damodar =

Chimnaji Damodar Moghe

Rajadnya to Emperor Shahuji of the Maratha Empire, Peshwa of Kolhapur, Sardar of Parola
- Born: est. 1675; Parola, Khandesh
- Died: est. 1740; Kolhapur, Maharashtra
- Religion: Hindu

Chimnaji Damodar Moghe, popularly known as Chimnaji Damodar, was among the first Sardars to cross the boundary of Maharashtra to engage Mughal forces located in the central and northern regions of India in 1698. He also served as Rajadnya in the court of Shahu I and as Peshwa (Prime Minister) in the court of Sambhaji II of Kolhapur.

== Early life and career ==
Chimnaji Damodar was born in a Karhade Brahmin family. The year of his birth is not known, however, it must have been around 1675.

He was the Sardar of Parola located in the Khandesh region of Maharashtra. During the regime of Rajaram I, Ramchandra Pant Amatya encouraged the independent Maratha warriors to invade Mughal areas with intention to distract Mughal army concentrated in Maharashtra under the leadership of Aurangzeb. Chimnaji Damodar, along with Nemaji Shinde, happened to be the first to successfully respond to this strategy by crossing the boundary of Maharashtra and entering into Malwa. His troops attacked Mughal subjects in Central and Northern parts of India and looted enormous money and treasure.

== Later life ==
In 1707, when Shahu was released by the Mughals, Chimnaji Damodar left Tarabai and joined Shahu.

He contributed a lot in Shahu’s victory against Tarabai at Khed as a result of which Shahu appointed him as Mutalik (Deputy Prime Minister). Subsequently, he was appointed to the prestigious post of Rajadnya (Deputy to the Crown). In 1718-1719, he accompanied Peshwa Balaji Vishwanath in his expedition to Delhi. In 1720, after Balaji Vishwanath’s death, Bajirao became the new Peshwa over objections raised by Damodar that Bajirao lacked the experience required for such a responsible post. As a result, he withdrew himself from Shahu’s court.

In 1727, Sambhaji II appointed him as Peshwa of Kolhapur state. In 1731, he joined hands with Dabhade and fought with Bajirao at Dabhai but lost. However, since then his relations with Bajirao went on improving till the end of his life. He had one son named Balwantrao Damodar.
