= Shivgad =

Fort in Kolhapur district, Maharashtra, India

Shivgad Fort
- शिवगड किल्ला
- Part of Sahyadri Hill Range
- Kolhapur district, Maharashtra
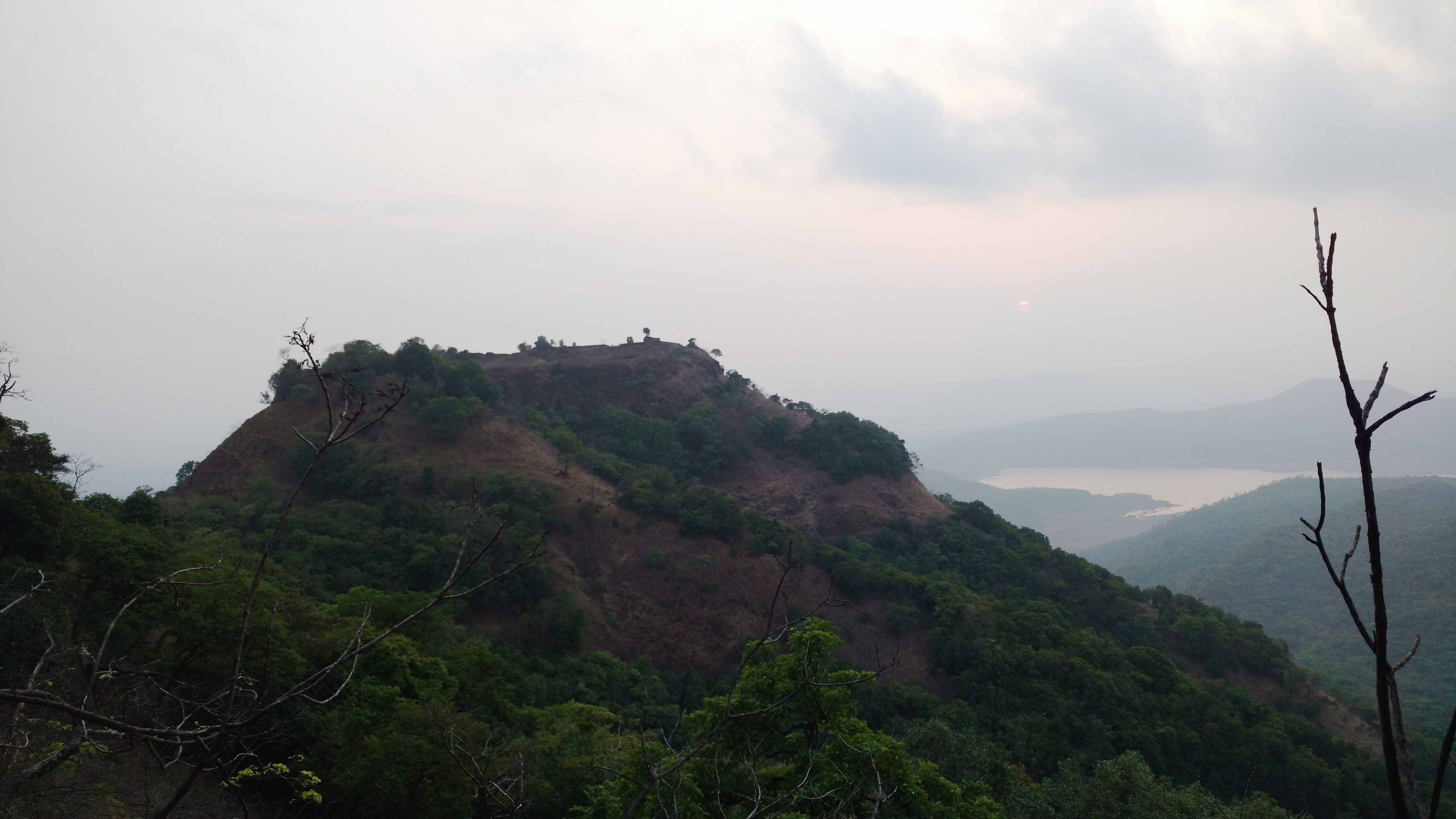
- Shivgad Fort

Site information
- Type: Hill fort
- Owner: Government of India
- Controlled by: Maratha Empire (1739-1818); United Kingdom: East India Company (1818-1857); British Raj (1857-1947); India (1947-)
- Open to the public: Yes
- Condition: Ruins

Location
- Shown within Maharashtra Shivgad Fort (India)
- Coordinates: 16°24′46.8″N 73°50′32.3″E
- Height: 2400 Mt.

Site history
- Materials: Stone

Shivgad Fort (Marathi: शिवगड किल्ला) is a fort located 89km from Kolhapur, in Kolhapur district, of Maharashtra. This fort was an important fort in Kolhapur district as a watch over for the Phonda ghat trade route from Kolhapur to coastal ports. The fort is surrounded by thick forest and hill slopes.

== History ==
Ramchandra Pant Amatya was one of the eleven feudatories (Jehagirs) who controlled shivgad along with Gagangad fort. This fort was under the control of Pant Amatya of Gaganbawda, till the Indian independence.

== How to reach from mumbai ==
The nearest town is Radhanagari which is 61km from Kolhapur. The base village of the fort is Dajipur which is 32km from Radhanagari. The fort can also be trekked from base village Gadgesakhal which is below Phondaghat. It takes about 2 hours to reach from this village. There are good hotels at Radhanagari, now tea and snacks are also available in small hotels at Dajipur and forest check post at Thakyachapada. The trekking path starts from the hillock west of the forest check post. The route is very safe and passes through dense jungle. It takes about an hour to reach the entrance gate of the fort. There is no water on the fort so, the night stay on the fort can not be made. The villagers from the forest check post make night stay and food arrangements at reasonable cost.

== Places to see ==
There is one dilapidated gate on the main entrance path of the fort. There are two bastions and a UgvaiDevi sati shila on the fort.

== Gallery ==
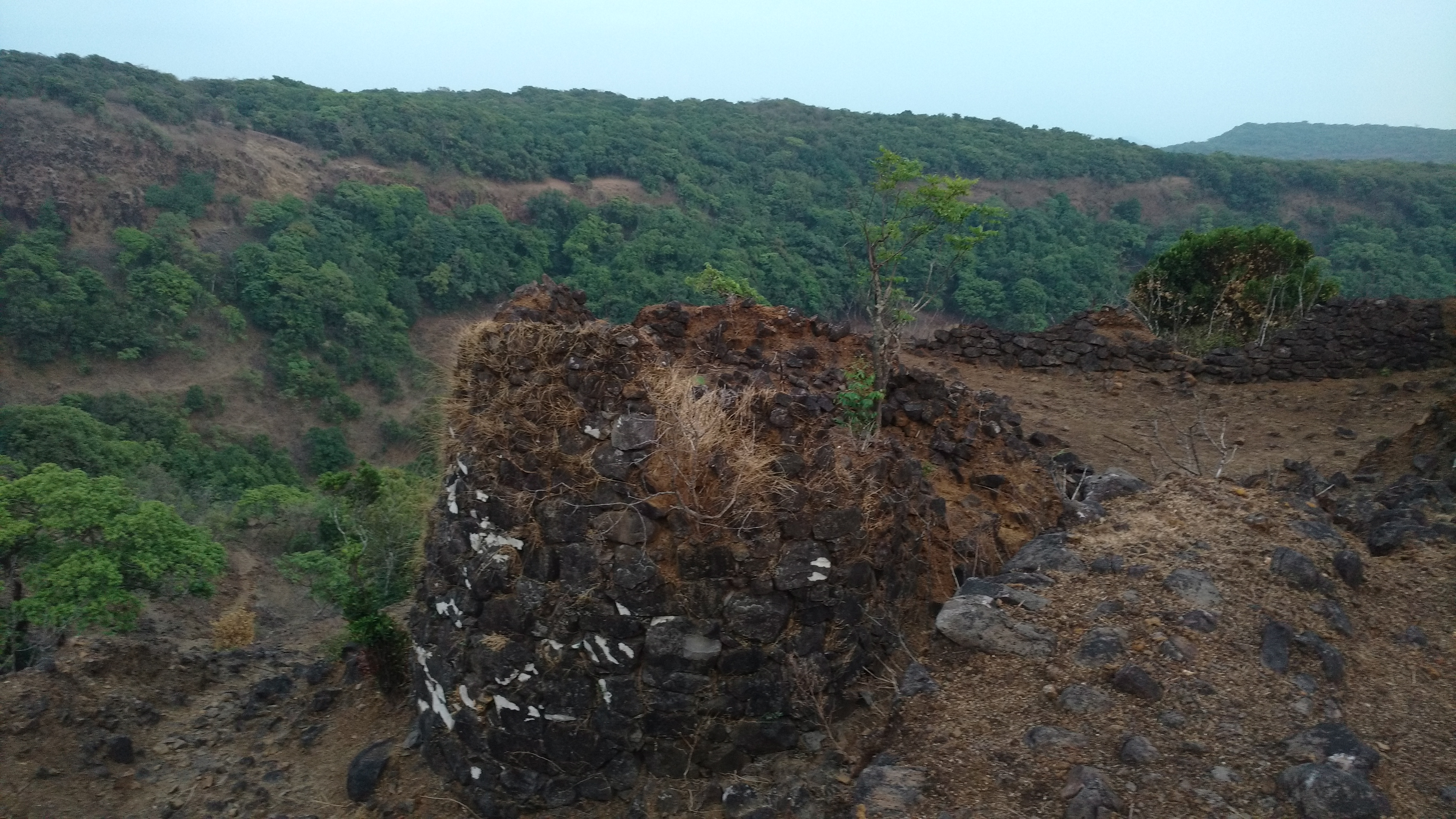
Main entrance of the Fort

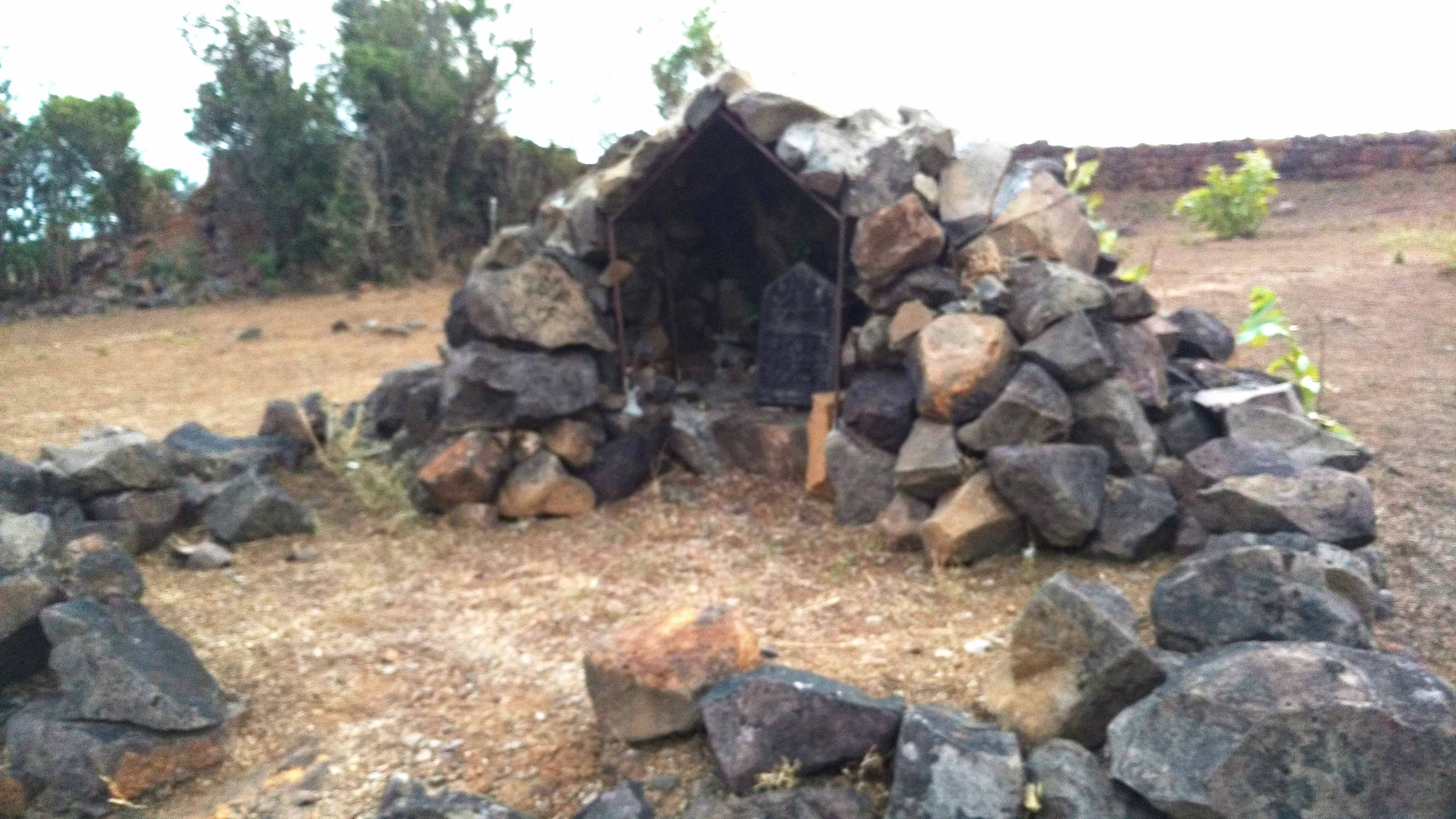
Ugwai devi

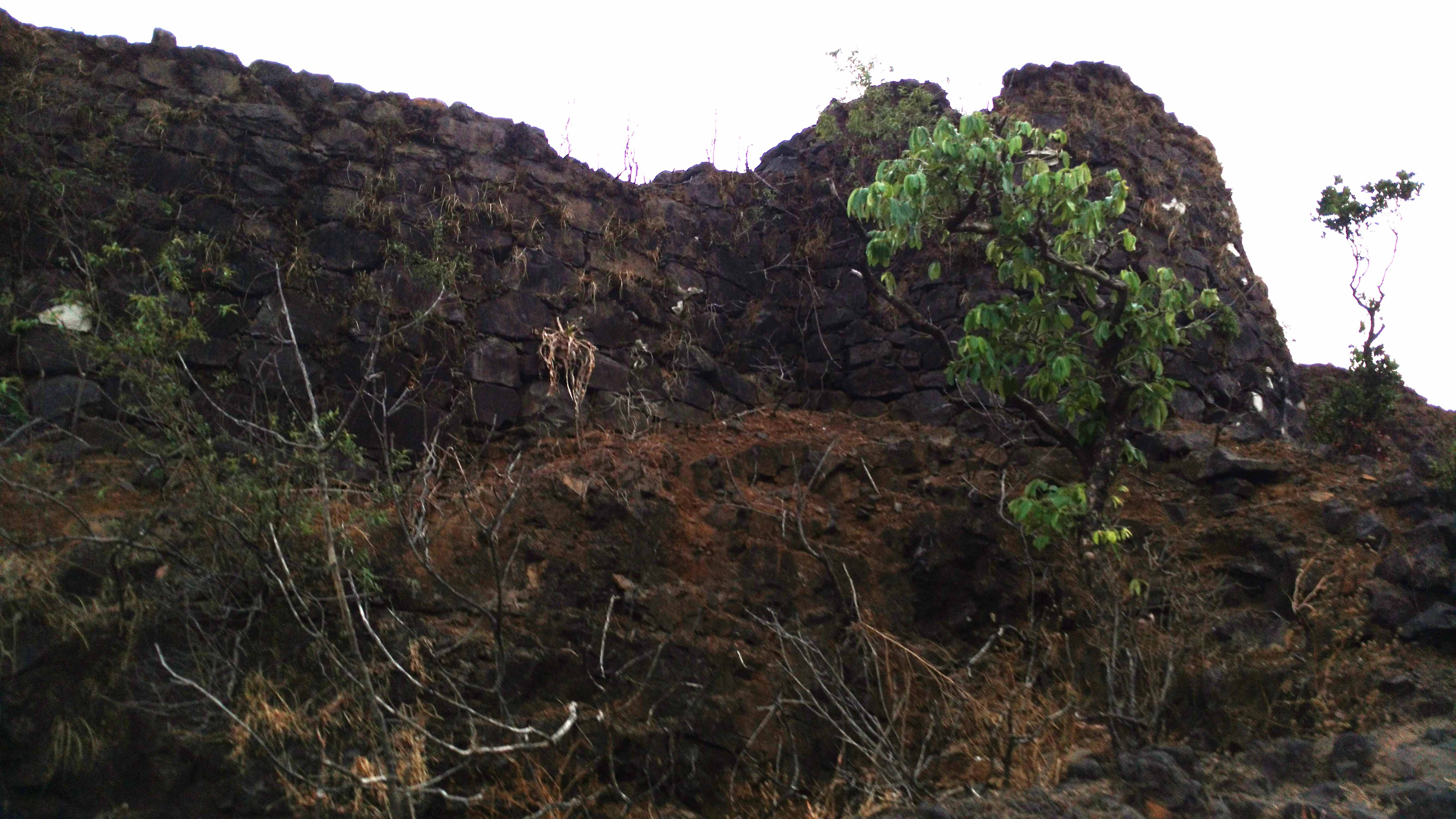
Bastion of the fort

== See also ==
- List of forts in Maharashtra
- List of forts in India
- Ramchandra Pant Amatya
- Marathi People
- List of Maratha dynasties and states
- Maratha War of Independence
- Battles involving the Maratha Empire
- Maratha Army
- Maratha titles
- Military history of India
