= Muqarrab Khan =

Indian Deccani military leader (r. 1675–1689)

- Abdul Razzaq Hyderbadi; Khan Zaman Fath Jang Dakhini
- Reign: 1675–1689

Muqarrab Khan of Golconda, also known as Khan Zaman Fath Jang Dakhini, was an Indian Deccani Muslim military officer, who was the most experienced commander of the Qutb Shahi Dynasty, during the reign of Abul Hasan Qutb Shah. He betrayed Shah during the Siege of Golconda and arrested the Maratha emperor Sambhaji at Sangameshwar, with the help of Maratha traitors.

Khan was a political rival of Shah's viziers Madanna and Akkanna. After Shah's defeat by the Mughals, Khan retreated to Golconda, and following its capture by the Mughals, he became its de facto ruler.

== In popular culture ==
- Khan was portrayed by Anil George in the 2025 Indian film Chhaava.
- He was portrayed by Pradeep Rawat in the 2024 Indian film Dharmarakshak Mahaveer Chhatrapati Sambhaji Maharaj.

== See also ==
- Siege of Panhala (1694–1696)
