= Gangu Teli =

Historical or apocryphal figure from the era of the Parmara dynasty of central India

Gangu Teli or Ganga Teli is an apocryphal oil-presser (Teli) from India. He appears in the proverb Kahaan Raja Bhoj, Kahaan Gangu Teli ("Where is the king Bhoja, and where is the oilman Gangu"), which is used to compare an important or high-status person (such as Bhoja) to an ordinary or low-status person (such as Gangu).

== Proverb ==
Many Indian languages feature the proverb comparing Bhoja and Gangu Teli (or an equivalent character). Besides "Gangu" and "Ganga", several variants of the name of the Teli ("oilman") appear in different languages and dialects. For example, Bhojva (Bhojpuri), Bhunjva (Bagheli) Doontha (Bundeli), Kāngla (Braj), Kangda (Haryanvi), Ganglo (Rajasthani), Gangva (Kumaoni), Gangaram (Bengali), and Ganga (Marathi).

Variations of the phrase include (transliterations in IAST):

- Hindi-Urdu: Kahān Rājā Bhoj, kahān Gaṃgū Telī
- Awadhi: Kahān Rājā Bhoj au kahān Bhojvā Telī
- Bhojpuri: Kahān Rājā Bhoj, kahān Bhojvā Telī
- Bundeli: Kahān Rājā Bhoj, kahān Ḍoonṭha Telī
- Braj: Kahān Rājā Bhoj, kahān Kanglā Telī
- Rajasthani: Kathe Rājā Bhoj, Kathe Gāṃglo Telī
- Kumaoni: Kān Rājā Bhoj, Kān Gaṃgva Telī
- Bengali: Kothāy Rāja Bhoj, Kothāy Gaṃgārām Telī
- Marathi: Kuthe Bhoj Rājā, Kuthe Gaṃgā Telī
- Haryanvi: Kitt Rājā Bhoj, Kitt Kāngḍā Telī
- Garhwali: Kakh Rājā Bhoj, Kahh Bandar Chor
- Kauravi: Kahān Rājā Bhoj, Kahān Gaṃgū Telli
- Bagheli: Kahān Rājā Bhoj, Kahān Bhunjvā Telī
- Punjabi: Kithe Rājā Bhoj, Kithe Gaṃgū Telī

In Kashmiri, the proverb changed into "Yetih Raja Bhoj, Tatih Ganga Teli", equivalent of the Hindi "Jahān Rājā Bhoj, Vahān Gaṃgā Telī" ("Ganga Teli is wherever Raja Bhoj is").

In Telugu language, the equivalent phrase is Nakka ekkada, nagalokam ekkada? ("Where is the jackal and where is heaven?").

== Legends ==
According to scholar P.K. Gode, in Marathi language, the source of the proverb seems to be the Sanskrit-language text Kalpa-druma-kalika, a commentary on the Jain text Kalpa-sutra. The commentary is of uncertain date, but Gode dates its extant manuscript to earlier than 1650 CE, based on appearance. The Kalpa-druma-kalika narrates the story of Bhoja and Ganga-Teli as follows:

A scholar (bhattacharya), who had spent 30 years learning all the sciences at Pratishthana-pura (Paithan), was very proud of his knowledge. After winning debates in several regions including Gujarat and Marwar, he went to king Bhoja of Ujjayini, and defeated all the 50 scholars in Bhoja's royal assembly, including Kalidasa and Bhavabhuti. Bhoja felt disappointed to see his scholars lose their prestige to a man from outside his kingdom. One day, Bhoja met a one-eyed oilman called Ganga-Teli (IAST: Gāṃgā-Telī), who said he would easily defeat the scholar from Pratishthana. Bhoja then introduced Ganga-Teli as his leading scholar (Bhoja-raja-bhattacharya) to the scholar from Pratishthana (Dakshina-bhattacharya or "southern scholar"), and arranged a debate between the two.

The debate began with the southern scholar showing one finger to Ganga-Teli. An angry Ganga-Teli responded by showing him two fingers. The southern scholar responded by showing him a hand with five fingers unfolded. Ganga-Teli responded by showing him a fist. The southern scholar then accepted his defeat, and bowed to Ganga-Teli.

Bhoja asked the southern scholar to explain what had just happened. The scholar replied that by showing one figure, he had indicated that the god Shiva is the only creator of the universe. Ganga-Teli replied with two fingers to indicate that Shiva is associated with Shakti. The scholar then showed five fingers to indicate that there are only five sense organs. Ganga-Teli responded by showing a closed fist to indicate it is possible to restrain these sense organs. The scholar then described Ganga-Teli as a scholar of unparalleled greatness who possessed "great powers of renunciation". Feeling excessively humiliated, he then left for his native place.

Bhoja then asked Ganga-Teli to explain the nature of the debate. Ganga-Teli said that the southern scholar showed one finger to indicate that his opponent was one-eyed. Ganga-Teli responded by showing two fingers to indicate that he would make the scholar blind in both eyes. The scholar then showed his palm to indicate that he would slap Ganga-Teli.

At this point, Bhoja and the members of his royal assembly started laughing. Bhoja honoured Ganga-Teli, who then returned home.

According to Gode, the antiquity of the proverb in Hindi and other north Indian languages is uncertain, and possibly other Jain texts contained a similar story.

Maive Stokes, in Indian Fairy Tales (1880), records a story titled Raja Harichand's Punishment. In this story, a divine punishment forces king Harichand and his queen to go into exile as destitutes. While wandering, they go to their friend Ganga Teli, who had provided them with a comfortable stay during their earlier visit. However, this time, because of their poor appearance, Ganga Teli provides them with unpleasant rooms and bad food. Next, they go to their other friend, king Bhoj, who treats them well.

Ganga Datt Upreti, in Proverbs and Folklore of Kumaun and Garhwal (1894), records another story about the origin of the proverb: Ganga and Bhoja were rival kings. Bhoja subjugated Ganga, seized his kingdom, had his limbs cut off. An oilman (teli) found Ganga, had him healed, and employed him. After the oilman's death, Ganga inherited his house and business. Even after becoming a handicapped oilman, Ganga continued to oppose Bhoja, inviting ridicule from people who declared that Gangu teli is not worthy of being compared to king Bhoja.

Historian Kashinath Krishna Lele, in The Paramāras of Dhār and Mālwā (1908), suggested that the proverb referred to the Paramara king Bhoja's military success against "Gangeya of Telangana", the Telangana region being subordinate to the Kalachuri king Gangeya (Ganga or Gangu). Historian R. Nath similarly connects the proverb to Bhoja's success against "Gangeya of Telingana".

Maharashtra-Vaksampradaya (1942), a dictionary of Marathi proverbs, states that Gangu (or Ganga) in the proverb refers to the Kalyani Chalukya king Tailapa II ("Gangaraja Tailapa") and Bhoj refers to the Paramara king Munja, the uncle of Bhoja. P.K. Gode finds this explanation unsatisfactory, noting that while Tailapa II had killed Munja in the late 10th century, it is not clear if "Gangaraja" was an epithet of Tailapa or how Munja can be identified with his nephew Bhoja. Y. R. Date and C. G. Karve, the editors of the dictionary, do not cite any source for the explanation. Some other historians, such as K. M. Munshi and K. N. Seth, similarly speculate that the proverb may have originated as an allusion to the military successes of Bhoja against Gangeya and the Kalyani Chalukyas who controlled the Telangana region, "Teli" being a corrupt form of "Telangana".

Ambedkarite author S. Anand states that according to "official history", when king Bhoj faced a problem during the construction of the Panhala Fort, a priest (pandit) suggested a double human sacrifice - of a mother and her newborn child - as the solution. Gangu Teli is said to have 'volunteered' to sacrifice his wife Jakkubai and their newborn. Anand states that the fort has a small tomb for Jakkubai. He identifies king Bhoj as the "eleventh-century ruler of the Malwa region" (the Paramara king), but the Panhala fort was actually built by the Shilahara king Bhoja II.

== Casteist connotations ==
Several modern interpreters consider the phrase as casteist, since the Teli community historically held a low status in the traditional caste hierarchy. Sumit Rajak, a research scholar at the Jadavpur University, cites the phrase as an example of Bollywood "bashing the low-caste communities". In Sagina (1974), the song Sala Main to Saab Ban Gaya features a line Kaisa Raja Bhoj bana hain mera Gangu Teli ("How my Gangu Teli has become Raja Bhoj"). Dulhe Raja (1998) features a song containing the lines Chachundar ke sar pe na bhaye chameli / Kahaan Raja Bhoj aur kahan Gangu Teli ("A string of jasmine ain't no good on a rodent / Bhoj shall always be king, Gangu Teli redundant"). According to Rajak, the proverb "aptly indicates how in Indian society it is seemingly imperative, or rather normative, to compare a person of lower quality with a low-caste group." The Vidarbha Teli Samaj Mahasangh, an organization of the Teli caste, protested against the Dulhe Raja song, stating that it hurt the sentiments of the Teli community.

In 2013, Indian National Congress's Ghulam Nabi Azad referred to the Bharatiya Janata Party's prime ministerial candidate Narendra Modi (who belongs to the Teli caste) as Gangu Teli. The Bharatiya Janata Party criticized Azad's remarks as casteist and derogatory.

Referring to the Panhala fort legend, the Punjabi Dalit-Naxalite Sant Ram Udasi and his daughter Iqbal Singh have portrayed Gangu Teli as an unwilling victim, coerced and brutalized by the monstrous king Bhoj.
