= Ramchandra Pant Amatya =

Peshwa of the Maratha Empire from 1689 to 1708

Shreemant Peshwa Amatya Ramchandra Pant Bavdekar
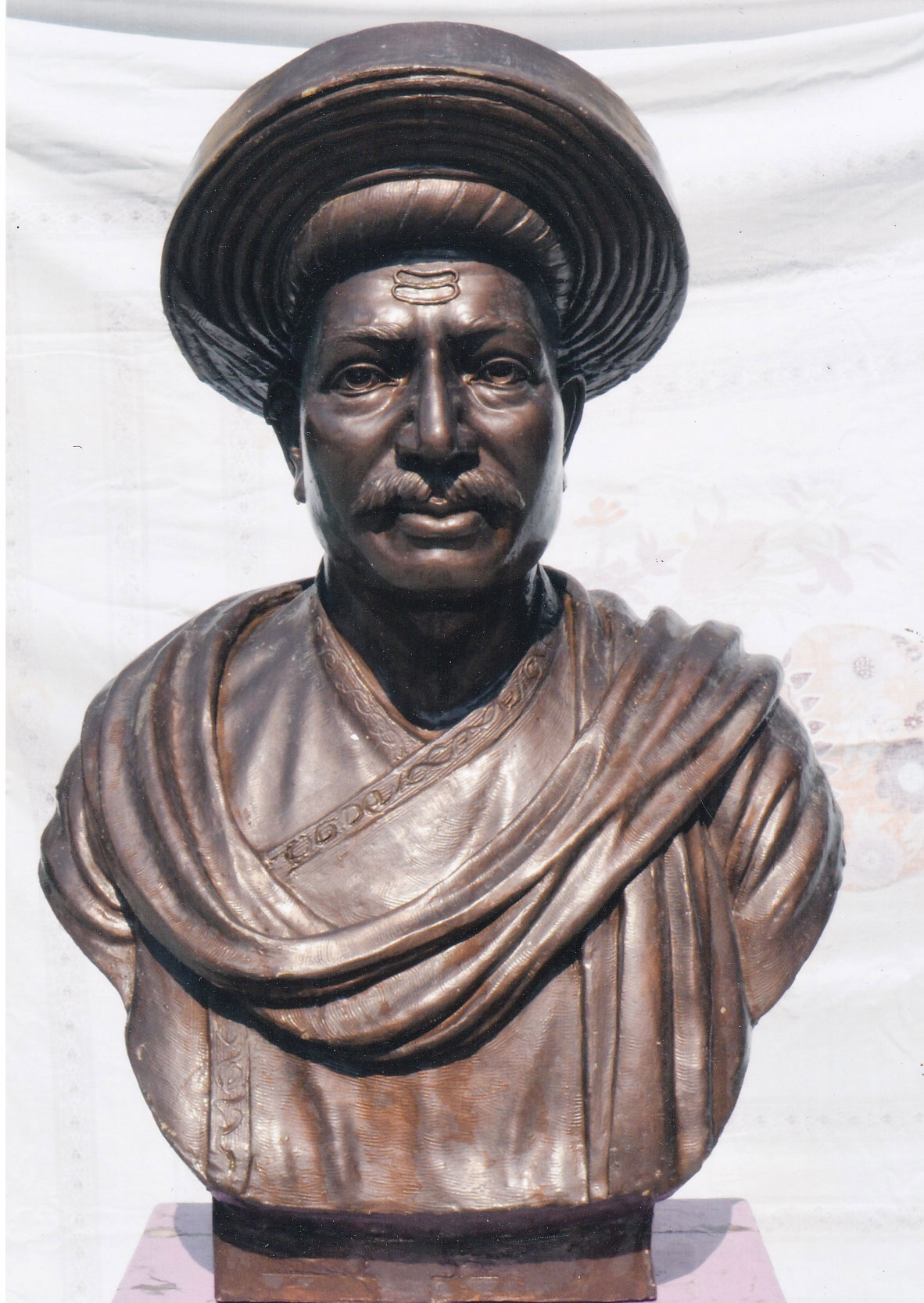
- Bust of Ramchandra Pant Amatya

Mujumdar/Amatya of the Maratha Empire
- In office 6 June 1674 – 1689
- Monarchs: Shivaji I Sambhaji
- Preceded by: Position established
- Succeeded by: Bahiroji Pingale

3rd Peshwa of the Maratha Empire
- In office 11 March 1689 – 1708
- Monarchs: Sambhaji; Rajaram; Shivaji II; Shahu I
- Preceded by: Moreshvar Pingale
- Succeeded by: Bahiroji Pingale

Personal details
- Born: Ramchandra Neelkanth Bawadekar; 1650 Kolwan, Ahmadnagar, Mughal Empire (modern day Maharashtra, India)
- Died: February 1716 (aged 65–66) Panhala, Maratha Confederacy (modern day Kolhapur, Maharashtra, India)
- Spouse: Janakibai

Ramchandra Neelkanth Bawadekar (1650–1716), also known as Ramchndra Pant Amatya, served on the Council of 8 (Ashta Pradhan) as the Finance Minister (Mujumdar/Amatya) to Chhatrapati Shivaji Maharaj, dating from 1674 to 1680. He then served as the Royal Regent to four later kings, namely Chhatrapati Sambhaji Maharaj , Chhatrapati Rajaram Maharaj , Shivaji II and Sambhaji II.ent to four later kings, namely Chhatrapati Sambhaji Maharaj , Chhatrapati Rajaram Maharaj , Shivaji II and Sambhaji II.

He authored the Adnyapatra, a famous code of civil and military administration, and is renowned as one of the greatest civil administrators, political thinkers, diplomats and military strategists of the Maratha Empire.

== Early life ==
Ramchandra Pant was born in a Deshastha Rigvedi Brahmin family in approximately 1650. He was the youngest son of Neelkanth Sondeo Bahutkar (more popularly known as Nilo Sondeo), who had risen from a local revenue collection post (Kulkarni) to the post of Minister in the court of Chhatrapati Shivaji Maharaj.

His family came from the village of Kolwan; near Kalyan Bhiwandi. Ramchandra Pant's grandfather Sonopant and uncle Abaji Sondeo were in the close circle of Chhatrapati Shivaji Maharaj. The Bahutkar family was closely associated with Samarth Ramdas. Samarth Ramdas is believed to be the one who named the newly born child as Ramchandra.

== Early career ==
Before 1672, Ramchandra Pant was engaged in various clerical jobs in Chhatrapati Shivaji Maharaj's administration. In 1672, he and his elder brother Narayan were both promoted to the post of Revenue Minister (Mujumdar) by Chhatrapati Shivaji Maharaj. In 1674, at the coronation ceremony, the post of Mujumdar was renamed as Amatya and the title was solely bestowed upon Ramchandra Pant. He worked in this capacity until 1678. On his death bed, Chhatrapati Shivaji Maharaj named him as one among six pillars of the Maratha Empire that would save the kingdom in difficult times.

After Chhatrapati Shivaji Maharaj's death in 1680, Sambhaji became ruler of the Maratha Empire, and Ramchandra Pant continued with his administration in various posts. Among other duties, Ramchandra Pant was sent to Prince Akbar, Aurangzeb's rebel son, for negotiations and, in 1685, Sambhaji also deployed him as an envoy to Vijapur for certain sensitive talks.

== Amatya of 5 Chhatrapatis ==
Ramchandra Pant Amatya was the only person (Amatya) who dedicatedly served The Maratha Swarajya under five Chhatrapatis in a row. When the Marathi empire was in trouble he used his wisdom, dedication to the throne and even force as needed to keep the empire and its Swarajya safe.

During the coronation of Chhatrapati Shivaji Maharaj, Ramchandra Pant Amatya was the youngest Pradhan of all the Asthapradhans existing at that time. Thereafter, during the reign of Sambhaji, Rajaram, Maharani Tarabai and (Kolhapur's first ruler) Sambhaji Raje, Pant Amatya always held a prominent positions. As Riyasatkar(s) rightly said that ‘ever since the time of Chhatrapati Shivaji Maharaj, Ramchandra Pant Amatya was the only person in the history of the Marathas who seems to have dedicatedly served the throne.’ Ramchandra Pant Amatya has laid down all the experiences encountered by him, while serving the throne in his book Rajniti (Adnyapatra). The said book is a testament to his dedication and service to the throne of Chhatrapatis and Hindavi Swarajya.

The forefathers of Ramchandra Pant Amatya had close relations with the Bhosle Gharana even before the establishment of Swarajya. Before the coronation of Chhatrapati Shivaji Maharaj, Ramchandra Pant Amatya's father used to participate in various initiatives undertaken by Shivaji. Ramchandra Pant Amatya subsequently carried forward this (his father's) tradition with even more impact. Ramchandra Pant Amatya took the lead when it came to the protection of the Swarajya. Being impressed by his efforts, Shivaji included Ramchandra Pant as Amatya in his First Ashta Pradhan mandal i.e. Council of Ministers. This, in itself portrays the qualities that Ramchandra Pant Amatya possessed. During the coronation ceremony of Shivaji, Pant was included as Amatya. He must’ve been 22–23 years old then. Before the coronation, a Pradhan Mandal was appointed by Maharaj in the year 1662 which included Ramchandra Pant's father Neelkanth Sondev as Maharaj's Amatya. This legacy was carried forward, as after the death of Neelkanth Sondev his son Ramchandra Pant was appointed as Maharaj's Amatya.

According to the information provided by the Bakharkar(s), Ramchandra Pant Amatya was one of the very few people present when Shivaji was on his death bed at Raigad. Shivaji had named a few people who had the ability protect the Swarajya after his demise. Ramchandra Pant Amatya was one of them. During the Reign of Sambhaji, Ramchandra Pant Amatya was given an important position. (In period of 1680 to 1685). He restored an almost finished Swarajya and made a great name for himself ". It is said that Ramchandra Pant Amatya was behind the bloodless coup that led to Rajasbai's son Sambhaji being crowned as The Chatrapati in 1713–1714. He felt it necessary as the Kolhapur Kingdom was heading towards a different path. There seems to be no ulterior motive behind this coup. He crowned Sambhaji as the Chatrapati and soon went in the background. As Sambhaji was only 16–17 years old he would naturally look up to Ramchandra Pant Amatya for guidance. Shortly after Ramchandra Pant Amatya died. There is some confusion about the date of his death but most historians assume it to be somewhere in February 1716.

== A Warrior and A Statesman ==
Ramchandra Pant Amatya was also a warrior as he was a statesman. He is known to lead many wars. Moghul historians mention that when Aurangzeb's grandson had invaded Panhala in 1693 Ramchandra Pant along with Pratinidhi launched a heavy attack on the Mughal forces. A Farsi historian notes that Ramchandra Pant was the head of Konkan army in 1699 and attacked them with all his might. His guns were blazing with all their might and a mighty war ensued.

A Portuguese Killedar has mentioned that on 22 February 1701 Ramchandra Pant along with 20,000 Maratha's attacked Dandya's Siddi Yakubkhan.

== Contribution to Maratha War of Independence ==
In 1689, at the time of Sambhaji's assassination by Aurangzeb, Ramchandra Pant was deployed at Fort Vishalgad. In consultation with Sambhaji's queen, Yesubai, who was located at Fort Raigad along with Rajaram and her son Shahu, he decided to send Rajaram to Fort Gingee (in current-day Tamil Nadu) to divide the battlefield. Subsequently, Rajaram was brought to Panhala fort and was secretly sent to Gingee. Before leaving for Gingee, Rajaram conferred on Ramchandra Pant the title of Imperial Regent (Hukumat Panah).

Thereafter, with the aid of generals Santaji Ghorpade, Dhanaji Jadhav, Parshuram Pant Pratinidhi, and Shankaraji Narayan Gandekar, Ramchandra Pant launched a great retaliatory war against the Mughal Empire.

== Wartime strategies ==
- To encourage the local Maratha warriors to fight independently against the Mughals, Ramchandra Pant adopted a new policy to officially reward pieces of land (Vatans) in exchange for military service. "Turn out the Mughals and own the land" was the pronouncement. This mercenary policy went against Shivaji's will, but Ramchandra Pant saw no alternative given the changed circumstances.
- Independent Maratha warlords were encouraged to cross the Maharashtra border and to invade Mughal areas in response to Mughal invasion. Nemaji Shinde and Chimnaji Damodar were the first warlords to successfully respond to this strategy.
- Appealing to Mughal greed, Maratha forts were traded to the Mughals for large sums. Once the forts were well equipped by the Mughals, the forts were re-captured by Maratha forces.

These strategies proved to be extremely effective against the Mughal Empire.

== Later career ==
In 1698, after Rajaram's return from Gingee, Ramchandra Pant voluntarily stepped down from the post of Imperial Regent.

In 1700, after Rajaram's death, Queen Tarabai once again delegated enormous wartime powers to Ramchandra Pant. Both of them continued to fight against the Mughal power in India. At the time of Aurangzeb's death in 1707, the Marathas had become extremely powerful and the Mughal Empire was on the verge of total devastation.

After Shahu's release from the Mughal camp, most of the Maratha generals defected from Tarabai and joined him. As a result, Tarabai was forced to leave the capital at Satara, fleeing to Panhala fort. Ramchandra Pant, however, strongly supported Tarabai at the time and worked as the Senior Minister for her son Shivaji II.

In 1714, Rajasbai instigated a coup against Tarabai and her son Shivaji II and installed her own son Sambhaji II on the Kolhapur throne. Modern-day scholars generally conclude that Ramchandra Pant was behind this conspiracy as he was appointed by Sambhaji II to the Imperial Regency immediately thereafter. It is speculated that Ramchandra Pant and his supporters were not satisfied with Tarabai's treatment of her peerage.

== Later life ==
On the request of Sambhaji II, Ramchandra Pant wrote the Adnyapatra (also spelled Ajnapatra), a standard code of civil and military administration for the Maratha Empire. It can be compared to Kautilya's Arthashastra.

In 1716, Ramchandra Pant died at the age of 66. A monument dedicated to his life and valiant effort in fighting against the Mughal invaders is located at Panhala fort. His heirs still live near Fort Gaganbawada to this day — a gift to Ramchandra Pant for his great contribution to Maratha power.

== Founder of Gaganbavada Jahagir ==
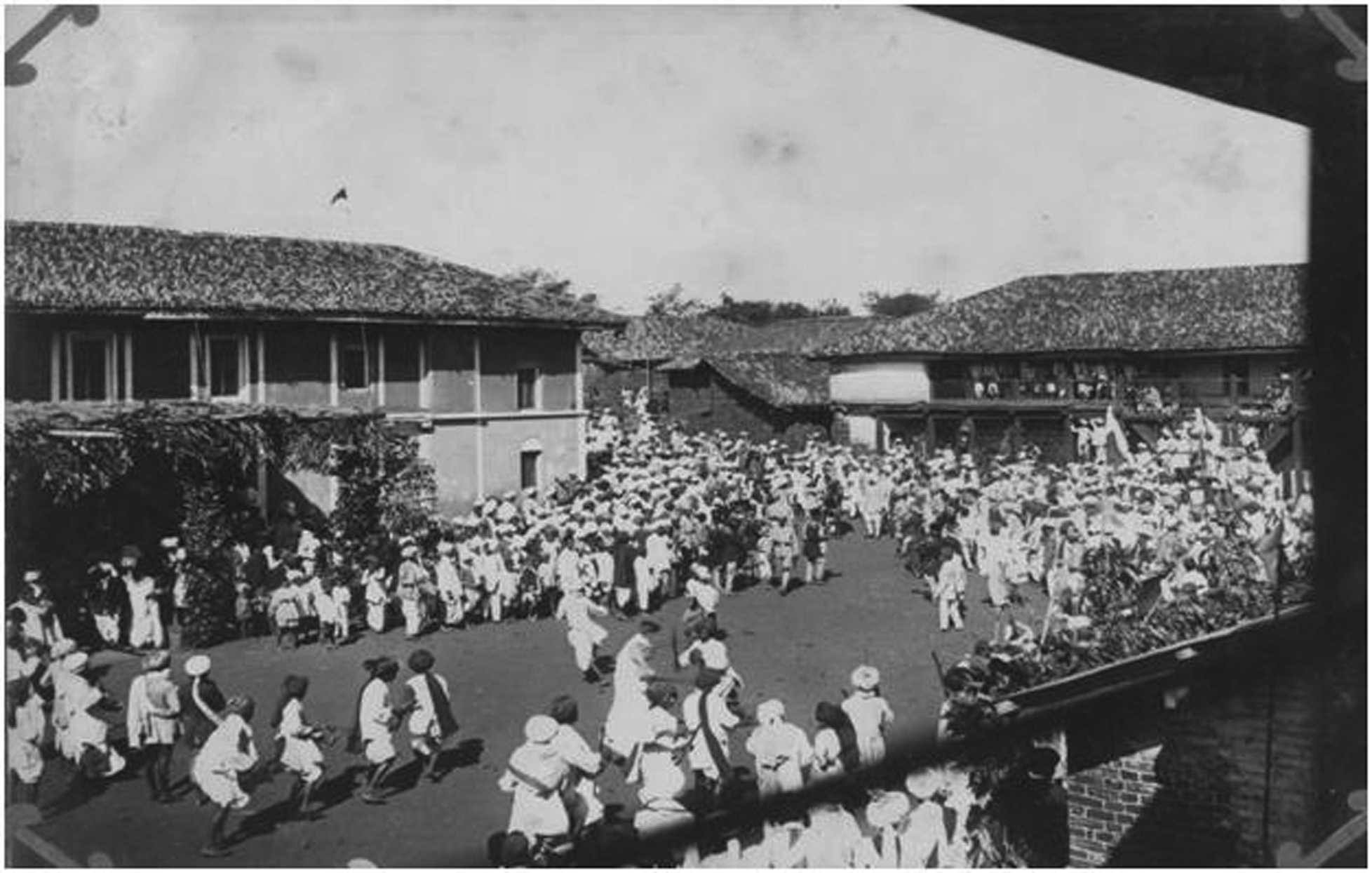
Pant Amatya Wada at Gaganbavada

The descendants of Ramchandra Pant Amatya were awarded the Jahagir of Gagan Bavda, the hilly region on the hilltops of the Konkan and the Konkan area. This was the largest Jahagir in Kolhapur state with an area of 243 square miles. The Jahagir extended from Mutukeshwar near Kolhapur almost touching the Mumbai Goa highway of today. The area in Konkan was managed from here. More than a mere Jahagir, it was a feudatory kingdom with its own revenue department, police force, judicial and criminal courts etc.

The Main Jahagir Offices were situated in Gagan Bavda where the police force, Revenue departments and Courts were situated in the Rajwada area.

The Jahagirdars of Bavda were given the title of Raja by Shahu along with 3 other Jaghirdars of Kolhapur namely Kagal (Ghatges), Vishalgad (Pratinidhis) and Kapashi (Ghorpades). The Bavda Jahagir though the biggest in area, was not the one with highest income due to people living in hilly area and scattered population. The Jahagirdar's of Bavda in spite of natural odds undertook many welfare schemes for the subjects in their area.

The Jahagir was abolished after independence and a privy purse was given to the Jahagirdar's until 1975.

The present descendants live in Tararbai Park, area of Kolhapur in Maharashtra state.

Geography of Bavda Jahagir (Sanstha Bavda):

Boundaries on the east, North and south of Bavda is the Kolhapur state. On the west, the Jahagir had a border with Ratnagiri district. Some of the towns in the Jahagir were also located outside the boundaries. The east west length is approx 40 miles and width approx 25 miles. The total area being 243 square miles. It was divided between Konkan Area and area on top of the Sahyadri Ghats. Most of the area is dense forests. The height of the konkan area from the sea level is 450 feet and the upper area height from the sea level is 200 feet. The Sahyadri mountain ranges reach up to a height of 3400 feet.

The forts of Gagangad and Shivgad were situated in Gagan Bavda Jahagir. In 1846, the old buildings on the Gagangad fort were demolished after which there was no habitation on the forts, until the time Gagangiri Maharaj built an Ashram on Gagangad fort.

== Gaganbavada Fort ==
Gaganbavda fort was built by Raja Bhoj between 1178 and 1209 A.D. The height of the fort from sea level is 2244 feet on the western Sahyadri Mountain ranges. The fort had buildings earlier which have demolished.

Gagan Bavda fort came into the Maratha's control in the year 1660. It was given to Ramchandra Pant Amatya's father Nilo Sondev. For some time, it was captured by the Adilshahi forces but came back into the Maratha's fold in 1689. After the Maghals held Sambhaji, it went in to their hands. Ramchandra Pant Amatya captured it and brought it under Swaraj in 1700 and which remained in The Bavda Jahagir till independence.

At the time Bavda Jahagir extended up to Malvan and Vijaydurg and had a cavalry of 25000.

== Bibliography ==
- Dahiya, Poonam Dalal (2017). Ancient and Medieval India. McGraw-Hill Education. ISBN 9789352606733.
