= Adnyapatra =

Adnyapatra, also pronounced as ‘Ajnapatra’, is a royal edict on the principles of Maratha policy written in Modi script by Ramchandra Pant Amatya, who served on the Council of 8 (Ashta Pradhan) as the Finance Minister (Amatya) to Maratha King Shivaji, with intention to guide Shivaji’s grandson Sambhaji II. It is supposed to be the formal documentation of Shivaji’s ideals, principles and policies of state administration.

== Background ==
In the strict sense, Adnyapatra is not an official document as it does not bear any seal or other traditional signs used to denote the beginning and end of the official document. It is presented in the traditional form supposing as if the ruling teen-age king orders an experienced person in his court to tell him the history and the state policy adopted by his forefathers for his guidance. Date of completion of Adnyapatra is mentioned on the script itself as 19 November 1715.

== Contents ==
Adnyapatra is a script of about 7000 words in Modi Marathi. It is divided into two sections. The first section comprises the first two chapters which give a brief narration of the achievements of Shivaji and his sons in building and preserving the Maratha Empire. The second section comprises seven chapters in which he discusses the principles of state policy and various aspects of administration he had learned while working with Shivaji.

=== First Section ===
1. Introduction (Part I) : A brief history of Pre-Shivaji times as well as Shivaji’s times
2. Introduction (Part II) : A brief history of Post-Shivaji Times

=== Second Section ===
1. King – Duties & Responsibilities, Administration, Appointments
2. Ministers – Eligibility, Roles
3. Merchants – Importance, Growth
4. Vatandars (Estate Holders) – Facts, Preservation, discontinuation
5. Vrittis (Land Gifts) and Inams (Gifts) – Disadvantages, Ways and Means
6. Forts – Protection, Construction & Reconstruction
7. Navy – Importance, Precautions

== Select Principles ==
- One State, One Rule.
- All other objectives are fulfilled once functions of the state are smoothen.
- The king should always worry about his repute.
- The people to be appointed in different departments and at the royal kitchens, reservoirs, warehouses etc. should be trustworthy and selfless.
- Colleagues should neither be underestimated nor insulted in public.
- Advisors should be wise and intelligent.
- Administration should not be single handed.
- Many should not suffer for one’s pleasure.
- Interaction with spies should be very often.
- The suspect should be suspended unless and until doubts are cleared.
- Inefficient officers should be sidetracked and relieved skillfully.
- Punishment should be inevitable in the event of a crime or injustice.
- Reduction in Revenue weakens the power.
- Try for more after proper management of what already got.
- Ministers are pillars of the state structure.
- Delegate them full powers and make them full responsible.
- A Mirasdar or Vatandar may be appointed on a fort not located in his own area.
- Beware, however, from British Merchants and never give them land to permanently settle.
- Protecting yourself is as important as thrashing the enemy
- The one who possesses Navy shall possess the sea.
- Be careful during war, be more careful during surrender by the enemy.

== Comparison ==
- Most of the administrative aspects given in ‘Adnyapatra’ are similar to those mentioned in Kautilya’s Arthashastra and in some cases the former can be well regarded as extension of the later.
- Mestakas compiled by Hemadpant, the Prime Minister of Seuna Yadavas of Devagiri during 13th Century, deal mainly with the procedure whereas ‘Adnyapatra’ mainly deals with principles of the state policy.
- In Utopia Sir Thomas More presents an imaginary world with certain ideals and principles which can not be considered realistic. In Adnyapatra, however, Ramchandra Pant Amatya being a contemporary and close colleague of Shivaji, seems to have copied historically true contents after the manner of Shivaji proving them to be most realistic and genuine.

== Controversy ==
According to historians Sir Jadunath Sarkar, V.B.Kolte and S.N.Banhatti, the authorship of Adnyapatra is denied to Ramchandra Pant Amatya on the following grounds :

- There is no evidence supporting the authorship of Ramchandra Pant Amatya in the text itself.
- The beginning and end of this script contains matter praising Ramchandra Pant Amatya and hence it is argued that no sensible author would write in such eulogistic terms about himself.
- Ramchandra Pant Amatya’s own behavior in respect of Vatans is inconsistent with the anti-land grant policy enunciated in the Adnyapatra.

== Refutation ==
These charges have, however, been refuted by historians T S Shejwalkar, G.H.Khare, S.N.Joshi and R.C.Dhere and were well supported by Govind Sakharam Sardesai and Datto Vaman Potdar on the following grounds :

- Adnyapatra was written in the traditional form of Bakhar where the Author doesn’t take credit of his own works but presents it as if the king is ordering him to write or act.
- The honorific titles appended to Ramchandra Pant Amatya in the beginning and at the end of the script could also be found to have prefixed to the names of many ordinary and incompetent officers in the historical papers. It was not a matter of praise but a style or normal practice of those days.
- Regarding Vatans and Vritties, Ramchandra Pant Amatya had to overlook certain guidelines of Shivaji during the independence war from 1689 to 1707 as the circumstances had totally changed. He had to offer Vatans and Vritties to attract Maratha Generals whom Mughals had already offered similar land gifts. Supposing that Ramchandra Pant himself was greedy of such Vatans, he can at the most be considered as a person of loose character but his authorship can’t positively be challenged.
- Lastly, Ramchandra Pant Amatya was the only living person who was contemporary of four successive sovereigns (Shivaji, Sambhaji, Rajaram and Shivaji II) and who had the ripe experience expressed in the Adnyapatra. None other than him could have written so meticulously about the Navy, and capitalistic European merchants as none else had direct touch with coastal affairs.
