= Siege of Panhala (1694–1696) =

Mughal siege of Panhala from 1694 to 1696

Siege of Panhala of 1694–1696
- Part of Deccan wars
Date	March 1694 – January 1696
Location	Panhala, Maharastra
Result	Maratha victory

Belligerents
Maratha Empire	Mughal Empire

Commanders and leaders
Rajaram I Dhanaji Jadhav; Parshuram Trimbak	Jahandar Shah; Feroz Jung; Udwat Singh; Muqarrab Khan; Bidar Bakht

The siege of Panhala was one of the important conflicts between Mughals and Marathas during the Deccan Wars between 1694 and 1696. Jahandar Shah laid siege to Panhala but was unable to capture the fort. Muqarrab Khan and Udwat Singh were sent to the relief, but they failed in taking the fort. Aurangzeb called Jahandar Shah back and sent Bidar Bhakt to continue the siege, but he, too, failed. He eventually was recalled from Panhala to take up the battle against Santaji. Feroz Jung was sent against the Marathas, but this effort too was unsuccessful.

== Battle ==
=== First attempt ===
Prince Muizzuddin arrived at the foot of Panhala, but there was no success with regard to taking it by siege or by bribery. In response to this, the Mughal Emperor summoned Khan-i-Zaman Fateh Jang Khan (Muqqarib Khan), Raja Udwat Singh of Orchha, and other commanders, ordering them to reinforce the Prince with a contingent of 6,000 men to intensify the siege. However, before their arrival, Muizzuddin put an end to the campaign and left for the Emperor on March 8. After hearing of his departure, the Emperor commanded his immediate return to effect the capture of the fort by all the means at his disposal. However, he quickly altered his mind and called the Prince to court instead. It was decided that the officers who had been in attendance on Muizzuddin should take command of the siege at Panhala under the command of Lutfullah Khan. The Prince was to have an audience with the Emperor on March 29.

=== Second attempt ===
In 1694, Mughal Emperor Aurangzeb sent Prince Bidar Bakht on an expedition for the capture of Panhala Fort. The Prince started his formal siege on the fort on April 5 and within a short time; though, by May, reports had come to the emperor claiming that one of the bastions had been breached and now it was expected that the fort would fall within days. Alas, the siege did fail and the fort remained unconquered. Later he was to transfer to Belgaum-Dharwar area to extinguish Maratha resistance in the region.

=== Third and final attempt ===
So the siege was lifted. However, the prince renewed his effort to capture the fort in April 1695 and would besiege it unsuccessfully until the end of January 1696, at which time the emperor commanded him to proceed to Basavapatan in Karnataka after Santaji's rout of Qasim Khan. The siege was then continued under the guidance of Firuz Jang, yet he was equally unsuccessful in the capture of the fort.

== See also ==
- Siege of Panhala (1660)
- Santaji Ghorpade
- Rajaram I
