= Pavangad =

Hill fort in Maharashtra, India

Coordinates: 11.323°N 75.764°E

The Kolhapur District of Maharashtra is half a mile towards the east of Panhala fort from which it is separated by a ravine. The chief defense of the fort is a scarped rock fifteen to twenty-five feet high. In most places the steepness of the rock has been increased by artificial scarping and it has been strengthened by a parapet wall of Kolhapur black stone fourteen feet high.

In 1827, under Shahoji I (1821–1837), Pavangad and its neighboring fort Panhala were given over to the British Raj. In 1844, during the minority of Shivaji IV (1837–1860), Panhala and Pavangad were taken by rebels who seized Colonel Ovans, the Resident of Satara, when he was on tour and imprisoned him in Panhala. A British force under General Delamotte was sent against the rebels and on 1 December 1844 breached Panhala fort walls, took it by storm. Shortly thereafter in 1844, the two main entrances of Pavangad were pulled down and the fort was dismantled. The fort though deserted has a good water supply.
