= Bhoja II (Shilahara dynasty) =

Shilahara king from 1175 to 1212

Shilahara king
- Reign: c. 1175 – c. 1212
- Religion: Jainism

Bhoja II (reigned 1175–1212) was a ruler in medieval India, the last of the Shilahara dynasty of Kolhapur in Maharashtra. He suffered a crushing defeat at the hands of Singhana, king of the Yadava Dynasty, in 1212 at Umalvad. He fled and his kingdom was annexed.

== Reign ==
He appears to have assumed the imperial titles from the beginning of his rule and was determined to retain the imperial glory won by his father. One of his own inscriptions reads; "fear of the edge of Bhoja's sword caused Cholaraja to take a spear on his head and frightened other kings; but by the favour of Maha Lakshmi, Bhoja II was worshipped by kings: he was a Vikram of the Kaliyuga".

== Eclipse ==
There remains no trace of the family after Bhoja II. In 1213-14 the Devgiri-Yadava king Singhana II was in possession of the country round Mirijaya (Miraj), as is proved by his Khedrapur inscription which records his grant of the village of Kudaladamavada, the modern Kurundavad, in Mirinji country. As inscriptions of Singhana II are found at Kolhapur itself shortly after that date it would seem that Bhoja II was the last of his family, overthrown and dispossessed by Singhana II in or soon after 1209-10 CE, the commencement of Singhana's reign. One of Singhana's inscriptions speaks of him as having been "a very Garuda in putting to flight the serpent which was the mighty king Bhoja, whose habitation was Panhala (Pannala-nilara-prabala-Bhojabhnpala-vyala-vidravana-Vihatngaraja).

An inscription of Saka 1194 indicates that the first king of the Yadava dynasty, Simha, had his original seat of power near Kolhapur at Miraj while two earlier inscriptions of the kings Mahadeva and Narayana, dated Saka 1162 and 1172 respectively, refer to the temple of Maha Lakshmi at Kolhapur and the district (Desa or Visaya) of the same name.

== See also ==
- Shilahara
