= Siege of Janjira =

1682 Maratha military campaign against the Siddis of Janjira

- Part of Deccan Wars
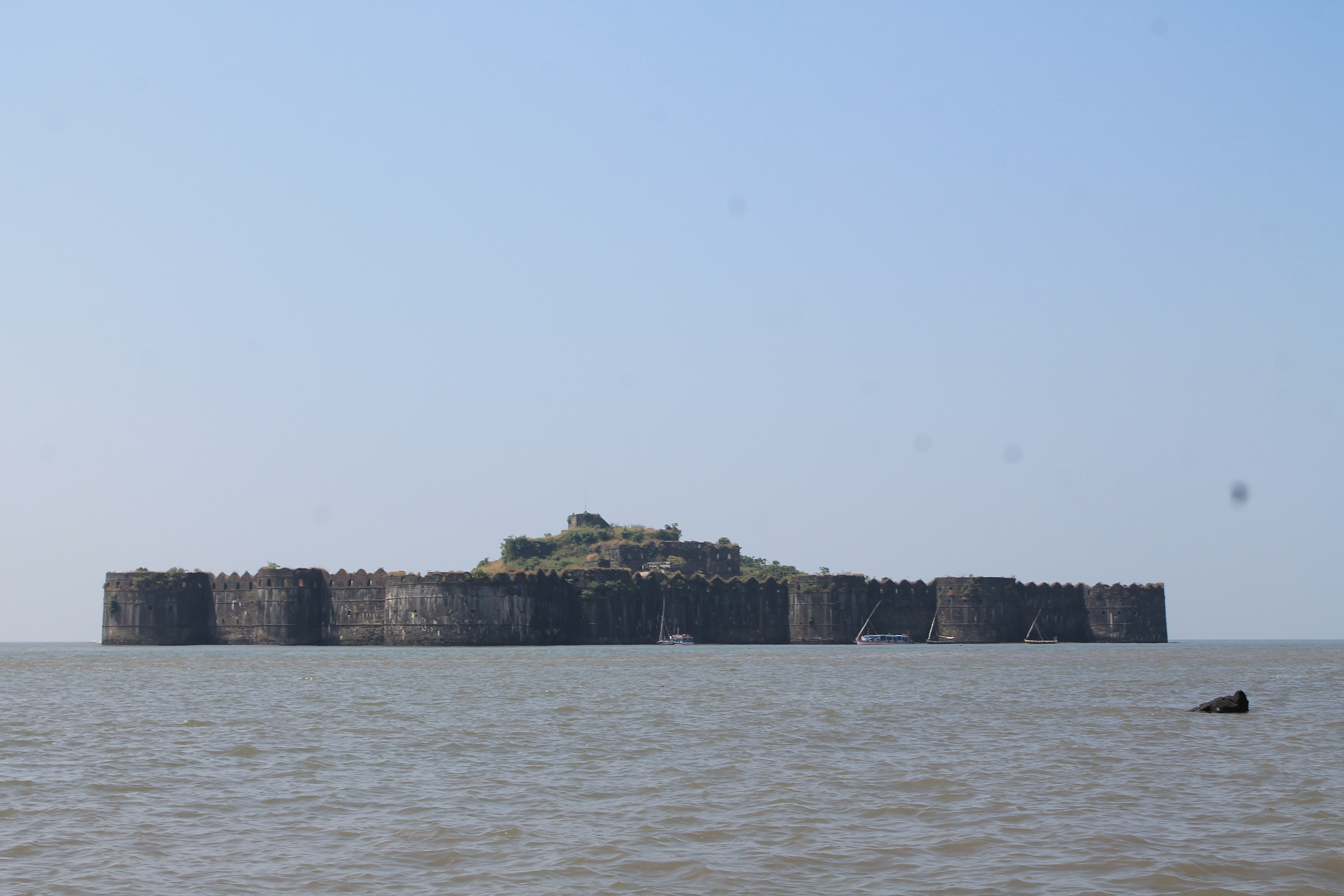
- Murud-Janjira fort
Date	January 1682
Location	Murud-Janjira 18.299589°N 72.964425°E
Result	Siddi victory

Belligerents
Siddis of Janjira; Mughal Empire	Maratha Confederacy; Rathores of Marwar; Supported by rebels against Aurangzeb under Prince Akbar

Commanders and leaders
Siddi Yaqub; Siddi Qasim; Siddi Khairiyat	Sambhaji; Prince Akbar; Durgadas Rathore; Dadaji Raghunath; Kondaji Farzand (executed)

Strength
Unknown	20,000 men
- Location within Maharashtra Siege of Janjira (India)

The siege of Janjira was a military campaign undertaken by the Maratha Confederacy, commanded by Sambhaji, the second Maratha ruler, against the Siddis of Janjira in January 1682. The Maratha forces, led by Sambhaji, withdrew from Janjira to the Konkan region in response to Mughal attacks, leaving a contingent behind under the command of Dadaji Raghunath Deshpande. Despite their efforts, the Marathas were unable to capture the fort, and the Siddis pursued the retreating forces, plundering Maratha territories.

The Siddis of Janjira, who allied with the Mughal Empire following the fall of the Ahmadnagar Sultanate, posed a significant threat to the Marathas of Konkan. During Shivaji's reign, several unsuccessful attempts were made to capture Janjira, the Siddi's capital. After Shivaji's death, his son Sambhaji, along with Prince Akbar, the rebellious son of Mughal Emperor Aurangzeb, and the Rajputs of Marwar, sought to besiege the Janjira fort. Initially, Sambhaji dispatched his commander Dadaji Raghunath Deshpande, later joining the siege himself. However, continuous Mughal attacks on the Konkan region forced Sambhaji to withdraw at an interval. Following Sambhaji's departure, the remaining Maratha forces were compelled to retreat from Janjira, resulting in heavy casualties among the Marathas.

== Background ==
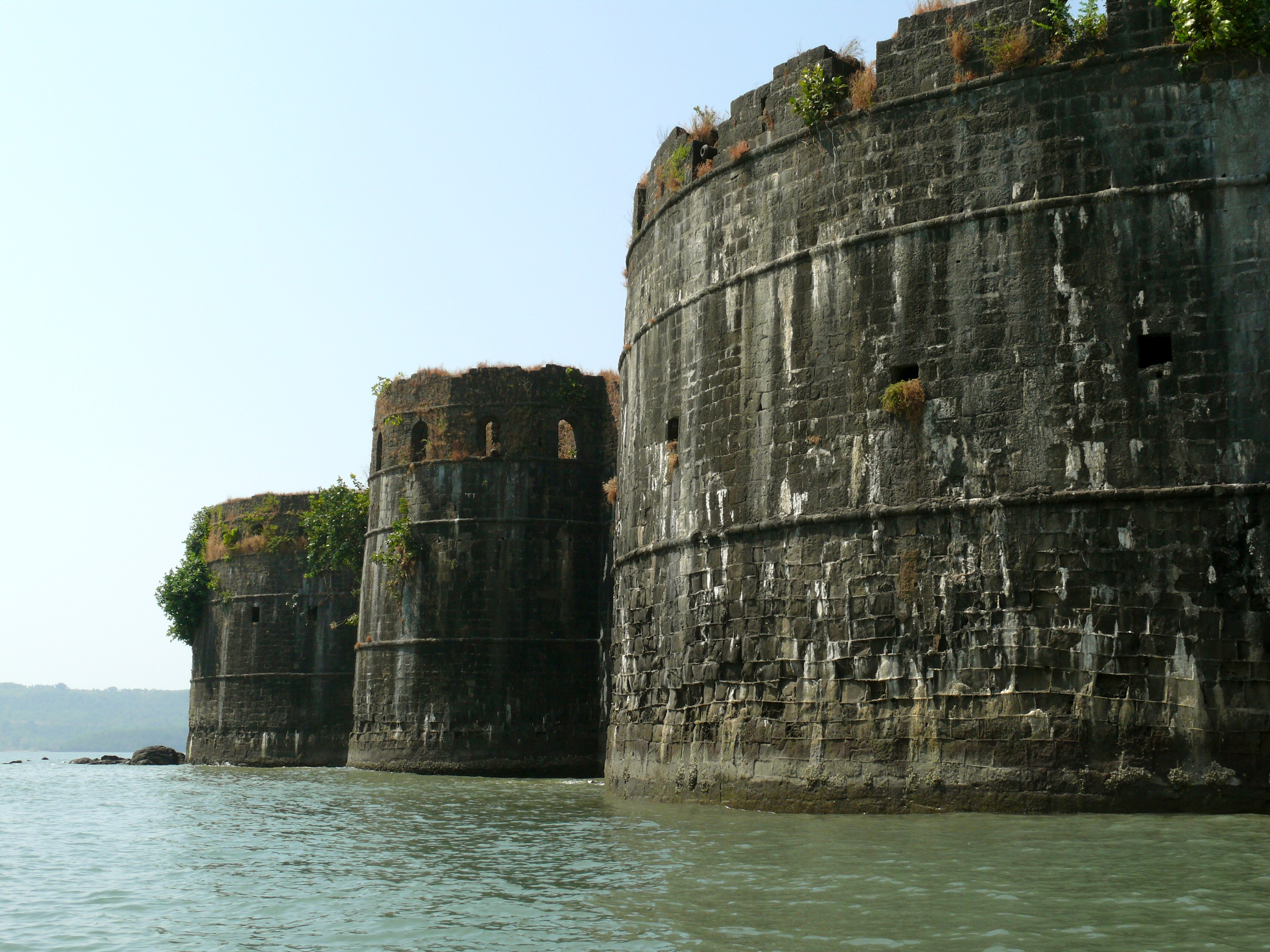
The Janjira fort bastions

The Siddis, African Muslims originally from Abyssinia, commonly known as Abyssinian Muslims, arrived in India through slave trades, as traders, or by settling in pursuit of their livelihood. They established settlements along the Malabar coast of India and gradually evolved into a naval power, with their main base located at Janjira, described as an "impregnable sea-girt fortress." The island of Janjira was seized by the Sultan of Ahmadnagar in 1498. The Siddis pledged their loyalty to him, and their local leader, known as Siddi, by his traditional title, was appointed as the Governor of Janjira on behalf of the Ahmadnagar state. This appointment granted legal validation to their inherited status as the local chiefs of Janjira. In 1636, during Siddi Ambar's governorship of Janjira, the Mughals ultimately conquered Ahmednagar, and the Ahmednagar Konkan region was relinquished to the Bijapur Subah of the Mughal empire.

With the ascent of Shivaji and the subsequent decline of Bijapur as an independent state, coupled with the loss of one of their more distant forts to the Marathas, the Siddis of Janjira shifted their allegiance to the Mughal Empire. Recognizing the value of their fleet and maritime expertise, Aurangzeb granted an annual payment of 400,000 rupees for the upkeep of their fleet and appointed Kassem Siddi, formerly the Bijapur governor of Janjira, as his Admiral. According to Orme, this change in loyalty occurred in 1661, with Low stating that "the condition of his tenure was the maintenance of a marine for the protection of the Mughal subjects trading to the Gulf of Persia and Arabia, from the Malabar pirates and the Portuguese." During Shivaji's leadership, the Siddis of Janjira were a persistent threat to the Marathas. The Siddis of Janjira are depicted in the Ajayapatra (royal edict) of Amatya, a statesman from the era of Shivaji, as follows:

"Further with a view to bring under his control this kingdom by his valour, he thought of subduing first the adjoining enemy who was like a disease in the stomach. The Shyamalas (Siddis) were truly the causes of harm to the state.... On account of the Shyamalas the success of the chief enemy was at first great, nay during the adverse times the Shyamalas conquered several territories and forts. At first the late revered king... checked the Shyamalas. On that occasion they were supported by the Tamras (Mughals) and therefore the Shyamalas remained as a power."

— Amatya, Ajayapatra,

Throughout his reign, Shivaji orchestrated numerous unsuccessful endeavors to breach the formidable forty-three-foot-high walls of Janjira. In 1676, Shivaji constructed Padmadurg sea fort northeast of Janjira in an attempt to rival the Siddi stronghold, yet this initiative ultimately ended in failure. Shivaji's offensive in 1659 against Janjira failed, leading to escalating conflicts with the Siddis. He amassed a fleet of 40 to 50 warships but faced frequent naval battles, often losing to the Abyssinians. In 1672, Siddi Yakut ravaged Bombay, forcing the British into negotiations. Despite treaties, Siddis repeatedly attacked Bombay, causing scarcity and loss for the English and Marathas. They burnt down the villages and took thousands as captives of the war. Despite his successes elsewhere, Shivaji struggled against the Siddis, a challenge that continued into Sambhaji's reign after Shivaji's death.

=== Pre conflicts ===
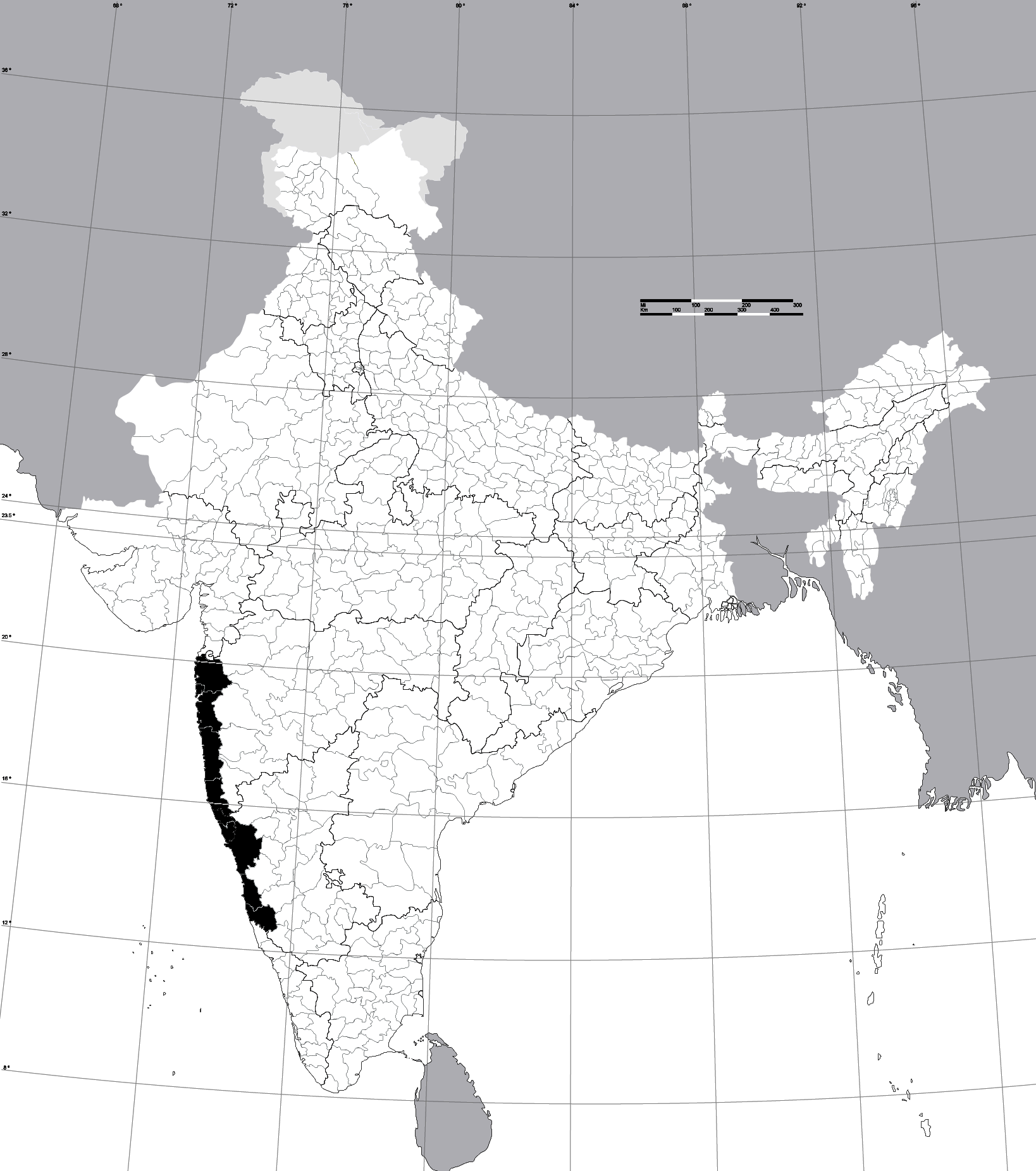
The Konkan region

During Sambhaji's reign, the Konkan emerged as the primary center of Maratha activity. Sambhaji confronted the Mughal armies led by Aurangzeb in person. The entire Maratha region was embroiled in conflict. The Siddis, who had pledged allegiance to Aurangzeb, battled the Marathas, spreading havoc and seizing many strongholds in the Konkan. Siddi Qasim annually sent his smaller vessels from Underi or Henry to safe havens in Bombay harbor and sailed with larger vessels to patrol near Danda Rajpuri.

The Siddis violated their treaty with the British, attacking the English stronghold of Bombay. In the ensuing skirmish, casualties occurred on both sides. The following day, Siddi Qasim and his troops approached the fort, prompting gunfire from English ships. Eventually, they were allowed to anchor under the condition not to attack the Maratha coast.

However, Sambhaji was displeased with the English's protection and threatened to invade Bombay. Subsequently, Sambhaji attempted to burn the Siddi ships and landed 200 men in Underi, resulting in disaster of Marathas as most were killed or captured. The Siddis brought the heads of 80 Marathas to Bombay, from the heads of the troops that were killed in the conflict. Despite plans to display 80 heads on poles, the British council intervened to prevent such cruelty.

== The siege ==
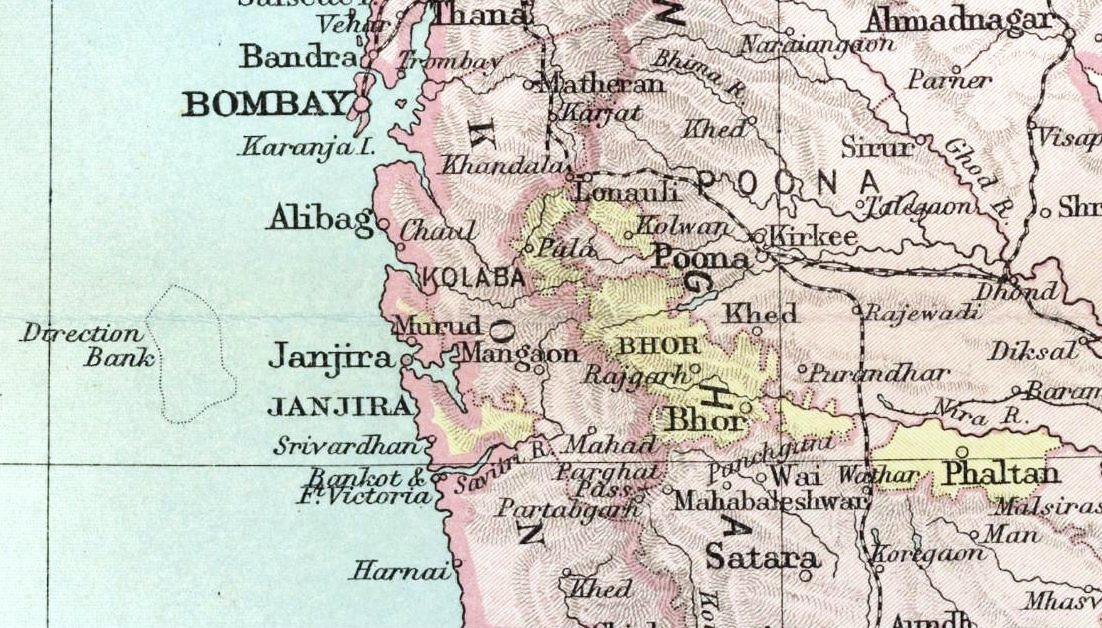
Map of Janjira with the Indian mainland

In early January 1682, Dadaji Raghunath Deshpande, a Maratha general, was dispatched to Janjira, the capital of the Siddis. Sambhaji pledged to appoint him as one of the eight Pradhans of the Maratha empire if he successfully besieged and captured the Janjira fort. By the final days of December 1681, Durga Das Rathore, the Rajput general of Marwar, and Prince Akbar, the son of Aurangzeb who rebelled against the Mughals, formed an alliance with Sambhaji against the Siddis. They converged with the forces of Raghunath Deshpande at Rajpuri, bringing a contingent of 20,000 men.

During the siege of Janjira, Sambhaji devised a cunning scheme with the assistance of Kondaji Farzand. They orchestrated a plot for Janjira's defection. Kondaji pretended to have a falling out and joined the Siddis, intending to detonate the Siddi magazine on the day specified by Sambhaji for the attack. Additionally, Kondaji brought women to corrupt the garrison. However, one of them had been the mistress of a Siddi officer, who learned of the plot. As a result, Kondaji and his associates were executed. Sambhaji then endeavored to fill the channel, which was eight hundred yards wide and thirty feet deep, with stones and rock fragments, aiming to create a causeway for the assaulting parties. However, Sambhaji's presence was short-lived as he was compelled to abandon the siege. He left ten thousand men under Raghunath Deshpande's command at Janjira due to ongoing Mughal attacks in the Konkan region, including the capture of the Kalyan fort.

Sheltered by a rock in the middle of the island, the garrison, led by Siddi Khairyat, persisted in their defense while Siddi Qasim cleared the bay of Sambhaji's fleet. After Sambhaji's departure, Deshpande ceased fighting and retreated from Janjira. Siddi Qasim pursued the Marathas to Bombay, where the Maratha general Dadaji Prabhu Deshpande attempted to defend by assembling boats for a counterattack, but they were ultimately repelled, resulting in a loss of two hundred men.

== Aftermath ==
The failed attempt, however, did not deter Sambhaji from continuing his campaigns against the Siddis. He dispatched one of his Subahdari to Anjavida, one of the domains of the Siddis, with the objective of capturing the fort and establishing a naval base. Upon learning of this, the Portuguese landed at Anjavida, expelled the Marathas, and established their own naval base there. This resulted in hostilities between Sambhaji and the Portuguese. In July of the same year, when Sambhaji attacked Chaul, which was under Portuguese control, Siddi Yakut Khan and Siddi Khairyat Khan rushed to the aid of the Portuguese.

For some time after Sambhaji departed, Siddi Qasim, along with his entire fleet, maintained a vigilant watch over Janjira. In April, he sailed to Bombay, where the English, fearing the Mughal Emperor's disapproval, permitted him to anchor. Following the arrival of the Siddis, they pillaged the Maratha coast, venturing as far inland as Mahad in Kolaba, and abducted the wife and family of Dadaji, Sambhaji's general.

In October, Sambhaji devised another assault on the Siddis, under the leadership of Siddi Misri, who had defected from the Siddis after losing command of the Mughal army. Sambhaji's forces comprised 30 vessels, while the Siddis had 15 vessels. Despite being outnumbered, the Siddis once again emerged victorious, inflicting wounds upon their leader Misri himself.

== Sources ==
- Mehta, Jaswant Lal (2005-01-01). Advanced Study in the History of Modern India 1707-1813. Sterling Publishers Pvt. Ltd. ISBN 978-1-932705-54-6.
- Ali, Shanti Sadiq (1996). The African Dispersal in the Deccan: From Medieval to Modern Times. Orient Blackswan. ISBN 978-81-250-0485-1.
- Nadkarnia, Rajaram Vyankatesh (1966). The Rise and Fall of the Maratha Empire. Popular Prakashan.
- Robbins, Kenneth X.; McLeod, John (2006). African Elites in India: Habshi Amarat. Mapin. ISBN 978-1-890206-97-0.
- Parihar, G. R. (1968). Marwar and the Marathas, 1724-1843 A.D. Hindi Sahitya Mandir.
