= Shivaji's invasions of Janjira =

Military campaigns of Marathas against Siddis of Janjira

- Part of Maratha invasions of Janjira
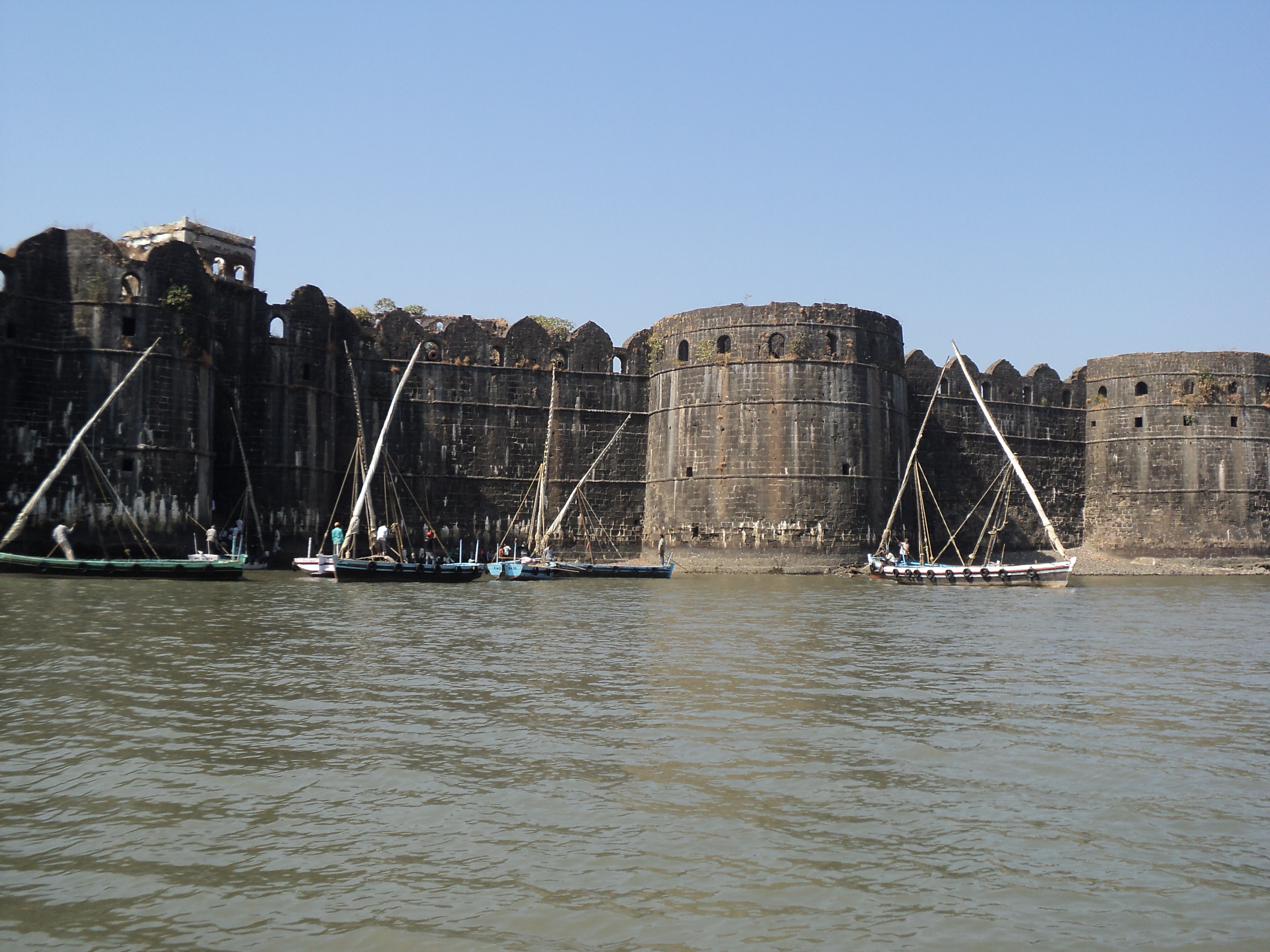
- Murud-Janjira fort
Date	1661–December 1676
Location	Murud-Janjira
Result	Siddi victory

Belligerents
Siddis of Janjira	Maratha Empire

Commanders and leaders
Siddi Yaqub; Siddi Qasim; Siddi Khairyat	Shivaji; Moropant

Casualties and losses
Unknown	15,000 troops dead (overall death)

The Shivaji's invasions of Janjira were a series of military campaigns launched by the first Maratha ruler, Shivaji, against the Abyssinian rulers of the sea fortress of Janjira named Siddis between 1661 and 1676. The Marathas attacked the Janjira fort annually, and during the final siege of 1676, the Maratha Peshwa Moropant faced a counterattack by the Siddis, forcing the Marathas to retreat with heavy casualties.

The Siddis, once part of the army of the Ahmadnagar Sultanate under Malik Amber, switched their allegiance to the Adil Shahi Sultanate after Ahmadnagar fell to the Mughal Empire. Despite attacks by the Marathas under Shivaji, the Adil Shahi rulers provided no military aid to the Siddis, which almost led to the surrender of the fort to the Marathas. However, Siddi leaders like Qasim, Khairyat, and Siddi Sambal opposed surrender and continued their wars with the Marathas. They eventually shifted their allegiance to the Mughal Empire, which provided them with military support. The Marathas launched annual attacks on the Janjira fort but failed to capture it each time, suffering significant losses. In 1676, the Maratha Peshwa Moropant faced a major setback when Siddi Qasim, with the Mughal fleet, launched a surprise attack on the besiegers. The last blow of 300 Siddis against the Marathas of 10,000 forces under Moropant made a big setback to the Marathas. This forced the Marathas to retreat, and despite Shivaji's efforts, he was unable to capture the Janjira fort from the Siddis during his lifetime.

== Background ==
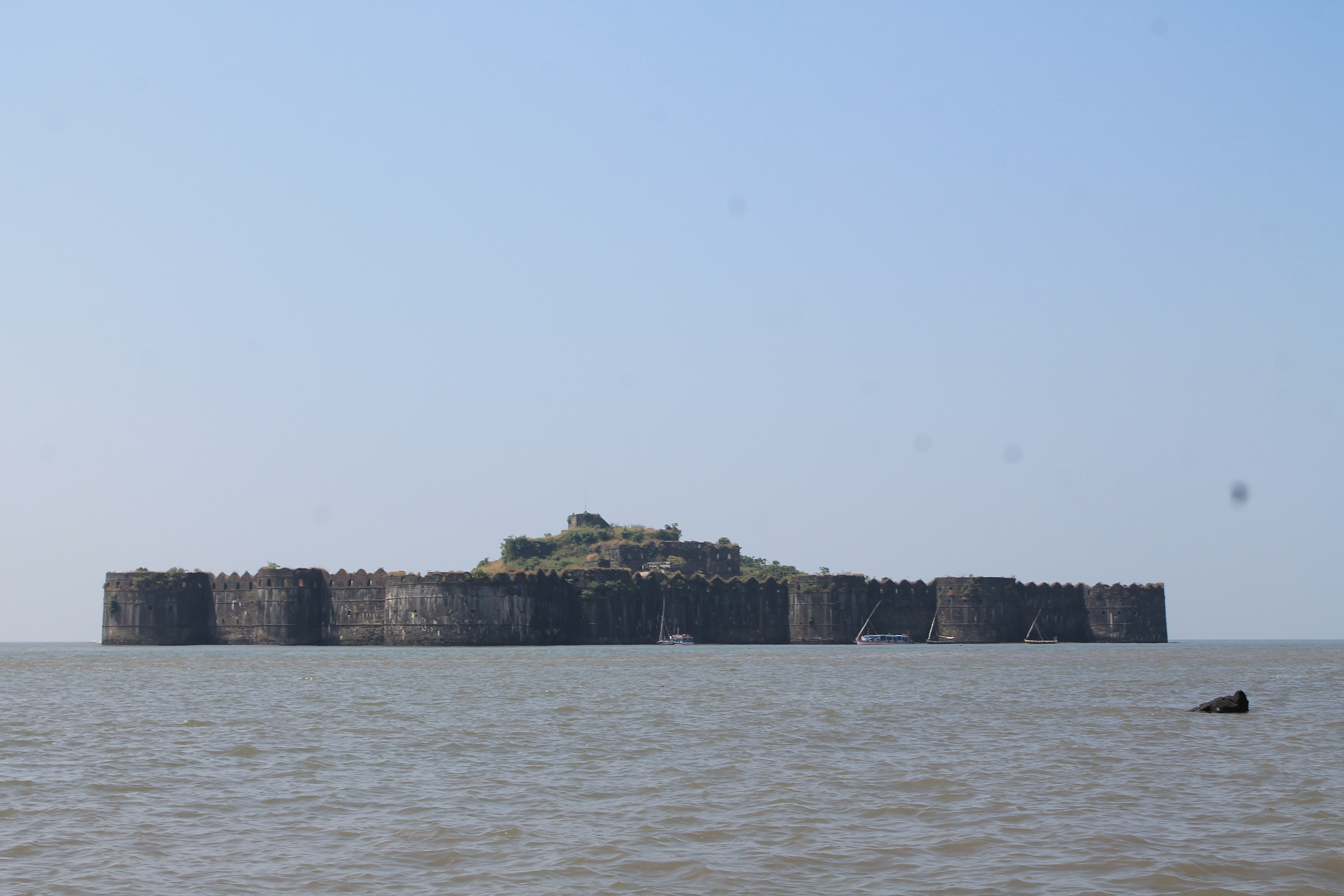
The Janjira fort

With Shivaji's rise and the subsequent decline of Bijapur Sultanate as an independent state, along with the loss of one of their more distant forts to the Marathas, the Siddis of Janjira shifted their allegiance to the Mughal Empire. Recognizing the value of their fleet and maritime expertise, Aurangzeb, the then Mughal Emperor granted an annual payment of 400,000 rupees for the upkeep of their fleet and appointed Siddi Qasim, formerly the Bijapur governor of Janjira, as his Admiral. According to Orme, this change in loyalty occurred in 1661. During Shivaji's leadership, the Siddis of Janjira posed a persistent threat to the Marathas, as the Mughals were the enemies of the Marathas.

The most formidable force along the Konkan coast was not the well-known European trading nations, but rather the Siddis of Janjira. They controlled sea forts and sizable nearby land holdings, and maintained a substantial navy to safeguard their merchant shipping. This intricate coastal environment was the one Shivaji encountered when he invaded the coastal regions of the Konkan in 1657. After defeating Afzal Khan of the Bijapur Sultanate in 1659, Shivaji focused on consolidating his control over the Konkan region. Recognizing the significance of naval supremacy, he invested in building a fleet comprising small, swift ships. Although they couldn't rival large European warships, they were adept at capturing merchant vessels. However, the primary objective of this fleet, much like the construction of numerous sea forts, was to confront and constrain the Siddis of Janjira.

The Siddis and the Marathas were locked in an enduring state of conflict, a feud passed down through generations like a blood feud. Despite the Marathas being preoccupied with battling stronger adversaries, they consistently restrained the Siddis, reclaiming any new territories they had acquired and imposing new alliances on them. This is a testament to the enduring strength of the Marathas. However, the fact that the Siddis managed to endure and maintain their position, despite the fall of many more powerful forces, speaks even more to the resilience and fortitude of the Siddis. Early in Shivaji's career, the first encounter with the Siddis occurred. In 1648, Shivaji launched an invasion into Siddi territory and seized one of their outlying forts. This marked the outset of the prolonged conflict between the Marathas and the Siddis, which persisted, with occasional pauses, for the next hundred years. Starting from 1659, Shivaji dispatched forces against the Siddis annually.

== The conflicts ==
In 1648, aided by Maratha commanders who penetrated the Konkan from behind the Sahyadri mountains, Shivaji managed to capture the Kolaba forts of Tala, Gosala, and Raigarh. The next year, under the leadership of Peshwa Shamraj Pandit, Shivaji dispatched a formidable force to invade the Siddis' territory. However, they encountered by the Bijapur general Fateh Khan and suffered a significant defeat with heavy casualties. Shivaji attempted to rectify this setback by sending another force led by Raghunath Pant, but Fateh Khan defeated them as well. Consequently, in 1660, the Siddis gained significant advantages.

The Siddis were allied with the Adil Shahi dynasty, also known as the Bijapur Sultanate. Despite the yearly Maratha attacks, the Sultans of Bijapur, who were the overlords of the Siddis, provided little or no assistance to them. Consequently, the officers who had previously defended Janjira at a crucial moment decided to break their ties with Bijapur. It was during this time that the Siddis shifted their allegiance from Bijapur to the Mughal emperor Aurangzeb. They approached the Mughals, offering to maintain their territory as vassals of the Mughals and to transfer the Bijapur fleet to the Mughal service in exchange for protection against the Marathas. Aurangzeb readily accepted their offer.

By 1661, the Bijapur general Fateh Khan decided to surrender Janjira to Shivaji due to the relentless attacks by the Marathas. Fateh Khan made this decision and offered to join Shivaji's service. However, the Siddis, who had transferred their allegiance to the Mughal Empire, specifically Siddi Qasim, Siddi Sambal, and Siddi Khairyat, devout Muslims and staunch enemies of Shivaji, did not approve of this surrender. They thwarted the betrayal by garnering the support of their compatriots, and with their approval, Fateh Khan was apprehended and placed in chains. Qasim and Khairyat, who were brothers, relinquished their claims in favor of Siddi Sambal, who was appointed as the governor of Janjira. In 1660, Aurangzeb changed Sambal's title from Wazir to Yakut Khan. However, this did not deter the Marathas from conducting their annual raids on Janjira.

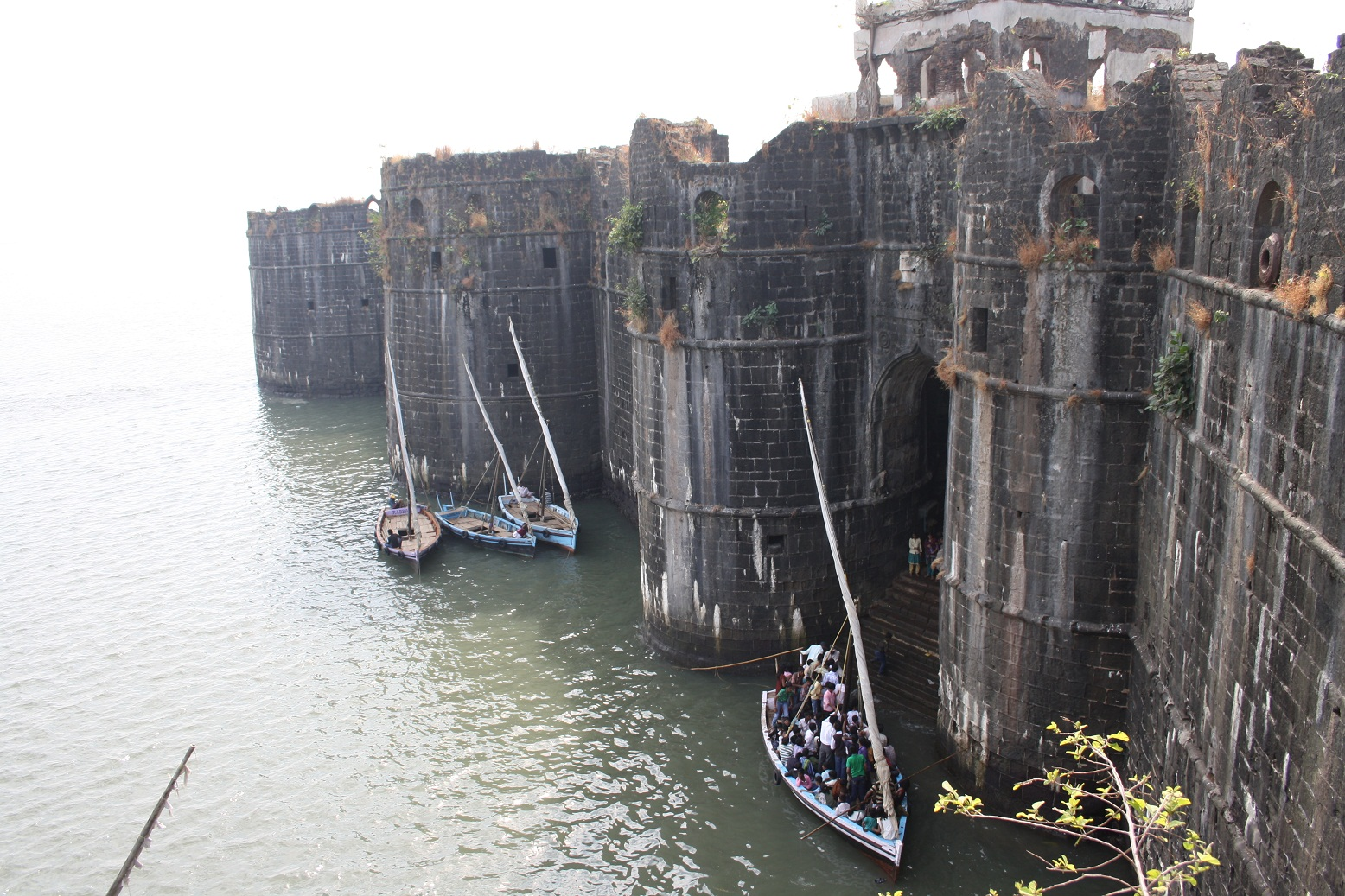
Fortification of Janjira

Shivaji became a vassal of the Mughal Empire following his defeat and surrender at the Battle of Purandar. In this capacity, he sought to capture the Janjira fort for the Mughal emperor Aurangzeb. However, the Mughal general Jai Singh intervened and prevented Shivaji from capturing Janjira. However, Shivaji engaged in direct conflicts with the Siddis every year after the monsoon season starting from 1661. Despite his attempts, he consistently failed to capture the Janjira fort. Altogether, he lost 15,000 men through the naval raid he conducted.

Between 1675 and 1677, Shivaji personally led efforts to besiege the Janjira fort. In August 1676, reinforcements under Peshwa Moropant arrived with a troop of 10,000, yet the Marathas were still unable to capture the Janjira fort. Siddi Qasim arrived with a Mughal fleet consisting of 300 men and successfully destroyed Moropant Pingale's floating batteries, forcing him to retreat to Raigarh. As a result, the siege was lifted, and the Marathas retreated by the end of December 1676.

== Aftermath ==
The invasions of Janjira led Shivaji to recognize the significance of naval power, prompting him to construct a fleet of small, fast ships. While these vessels couldn't rival large European warships, they were effective in capturing merchant shipping. The primary objective of this fleet, similar to the construction of several sea forts, was to confront and constrain the Siddis of Janjira. Despite expanding control in the Konkan region, Shivaji's inability to defeat the Siddis during his reign persisted due to ineffective artillery.

In the years following Shivaji's death, the Siddis had expanded their landholdings to encompass much of the central and northern Konkan coastal plains. Janjira Fort was the only location along the Konkan coast that neither Shivaji nor Kanhoji nor any of their combined seven sons were able to defeat, capture, control, or administer. The conquest of Janjira remained an unfulfilled ambition throughout Shivaji's life.

== Sources ==
- Ali, Shanti Sadiq (1996). The African Dispersal in the Deccan: From Medieval to Modern Times. Orient Blackswan. ISBN 978-81-250-0485-1.
- Gordon, Stewart (2007-02-01). The Marathas 1600-1818. Cambridge University Press. ISBN 978-0-521-03316-9.
- MacDougall, Philip (2014). Naval Resistance to Britain's Growing Power in India, 1660-1800: The Saffron Banner and the Tiger of Mysore. Boydell & Brewer Ltd. ISBN 978-1-84383-948-4.
- Sardesai, H. S. (2002). Shivaji, the Great Maratha. Cosmo Publications. ISBN 978-81-7755-287-4.
- Malgonkar, Manohar (1959). Kanhoji Angrey, Maratha Admiral: An Account of His Life and His Battles with the English. Asia Publishing House.
