= Murud-Janjira =

Island fort in Maharashtra, India

Murud-Janjira Fort
- Location in Maharashtra, India Murud-Janjira (Maharashtra)
- 18.299589°N 72.964425°E
- Type: Fortress
- Location: Raigad district, Maharashtra, India

Murud-Janjira (pron.) is the local name of a fort and tourist attraction situated on an island just off the coastal town of Murud, in the Raigad district of Maharashtra, India. Malik Ambar is credited with the construction of Janjira Fort in the Murud area of present-day Maharashtra India. After its construction in 1567 AD, the fort was key to the Sidis withstanding various invasion attempts by the Marathas, Mughals, and Portuguese to capture Janjira.

== Origins of the name ==
Murud-Janjira, Malabar Coast (Konkan coast) Maharashtra, India, July 25th 1774

The word Janjira is a corruption of the word "jazira", which means "island" in the Arabic language. Murud was once known in Marathi as Habsan ("of the Habshi", that is, the Abyssinians). The name of the fort is a concatenation of the Konkani and Marathi words, "murud" and "Janjiri". The word "morod" is peculiar to Konkani and is absent in Marathi.

== Major features ==
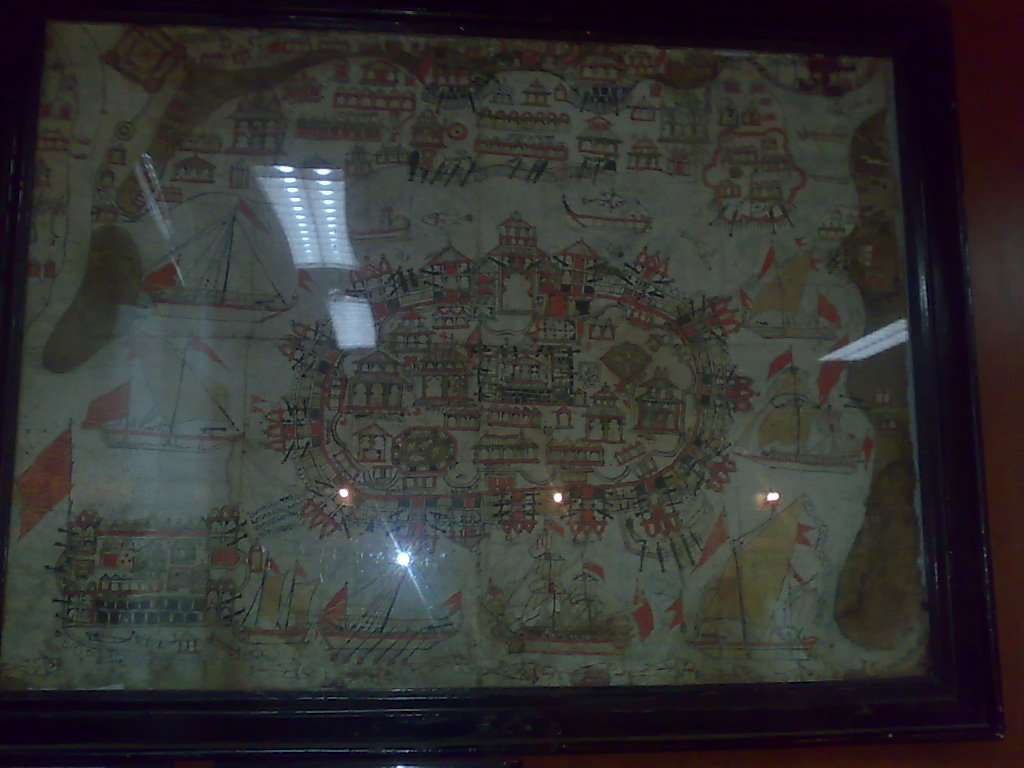
Fort Murud-Janjira paintings from the 17th century in the Mughal

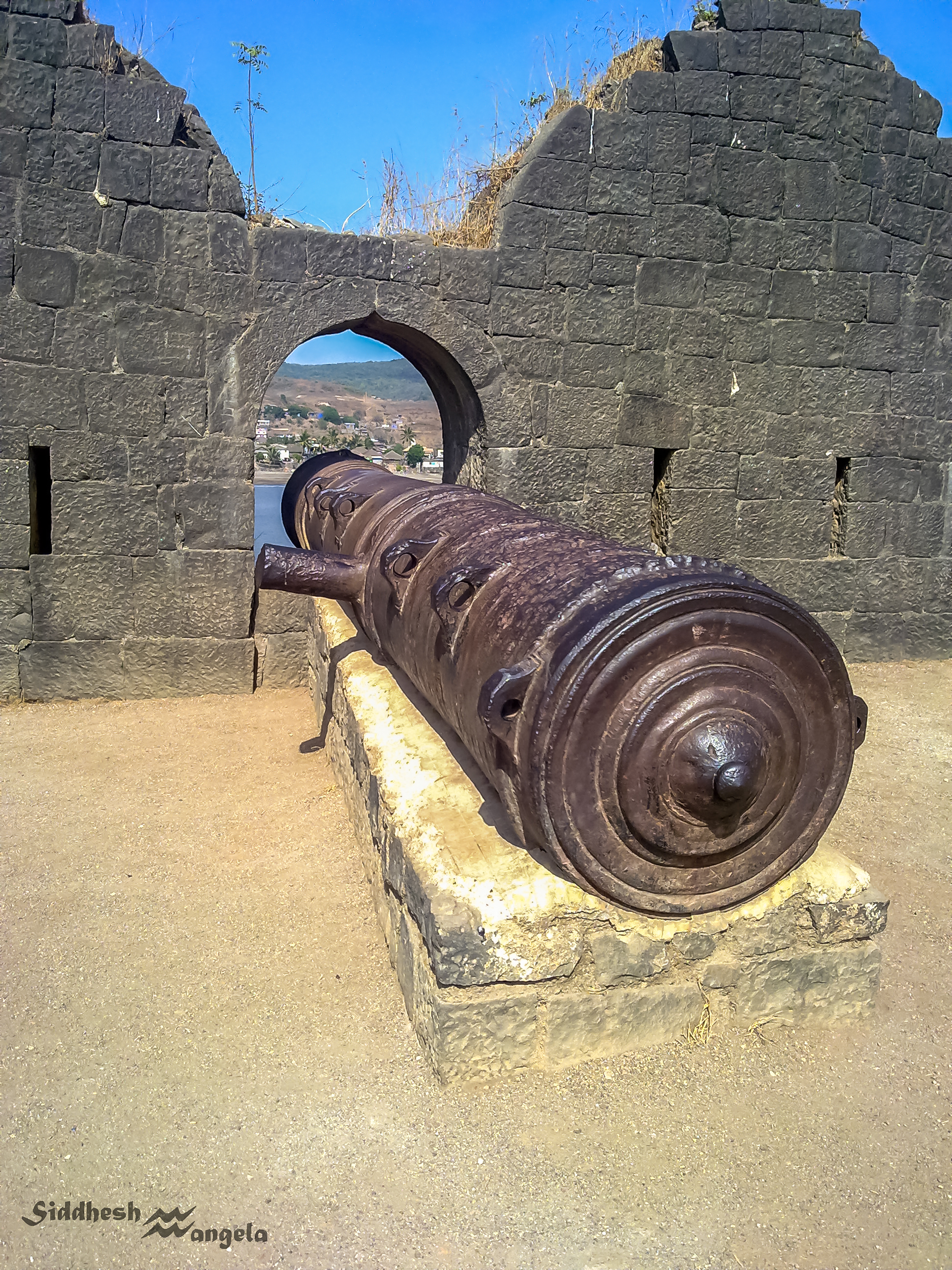
Kalaal Baangadi, the third largest cannon in India at Janjira Fort, weighing over 22 tons

Murud-Janjira Fort is situated on an oval-shaped rock off the Arabian Sea coast near the port city of Murud, 165 km (103 mi) south of Mumbai, in the middle of the western Indian coastline. Janjira is considered one of the strongest coastal forts in India. The fort is approached by sailboats from Rajapuri jetty.

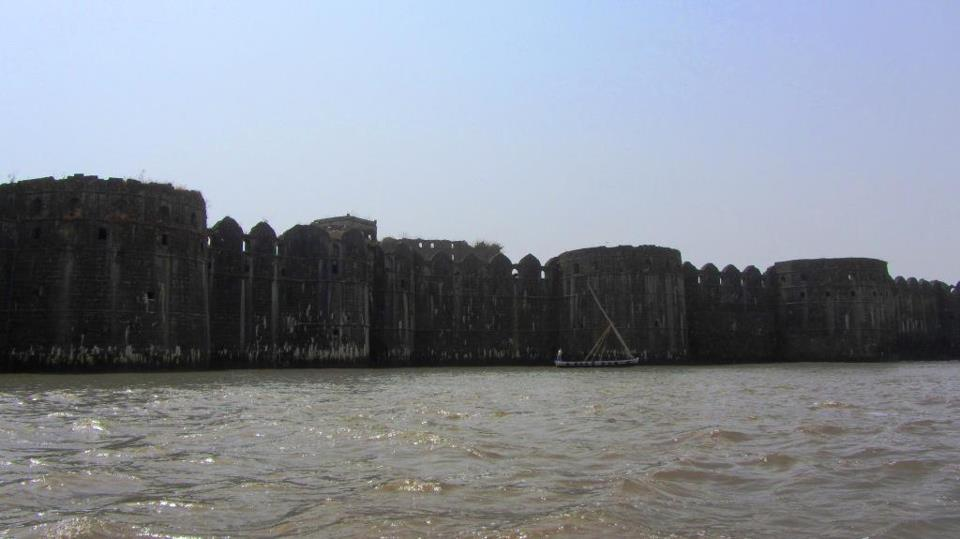
Janjira from the outside

The main gate of the fort faces Rajapuri on the shore and can be seen only when one is about 40 feet (12 m) away from it. It has a small postern gate towards the open sea for escape.

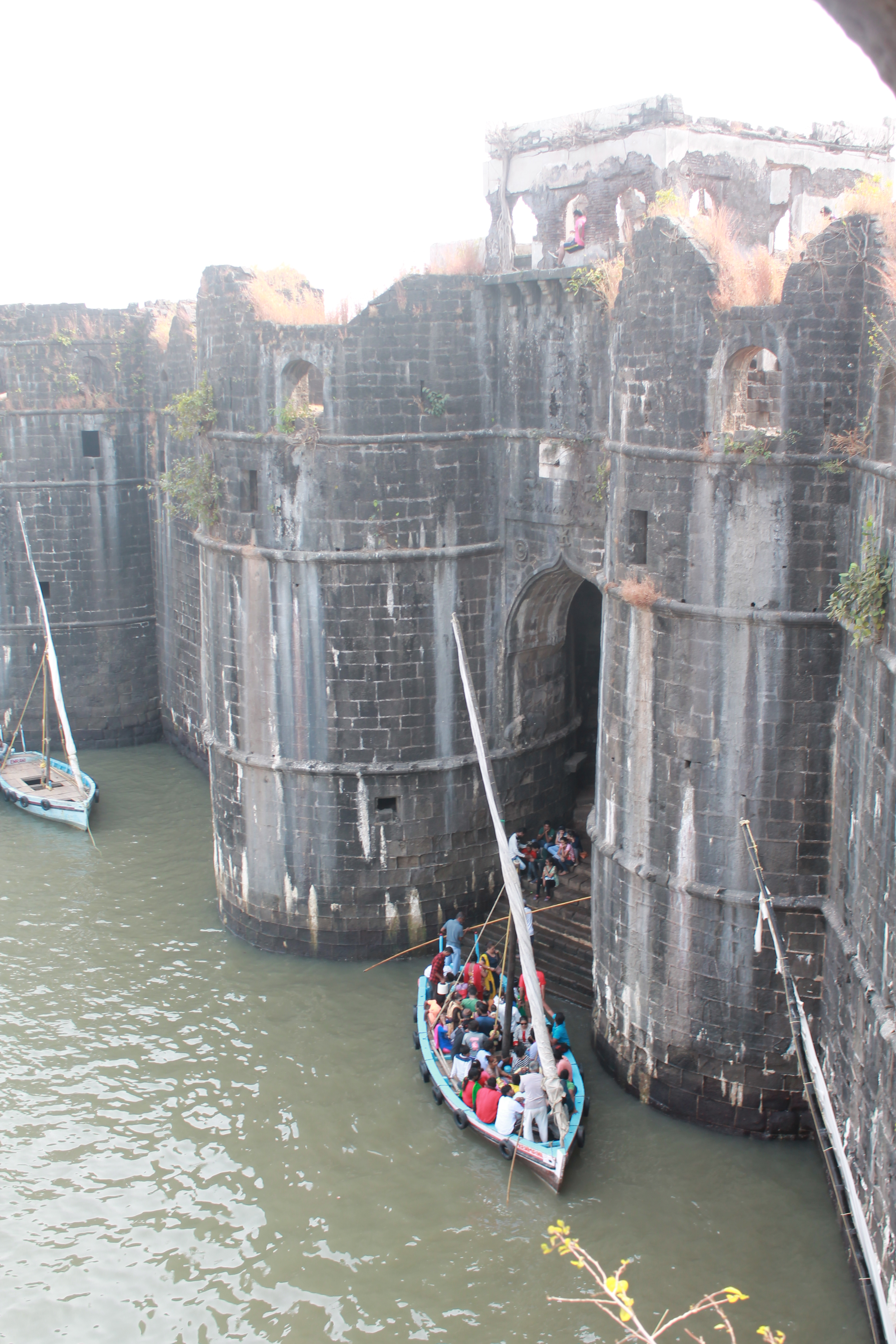
Entry Gate into Murud Janjira Fort. Accessible by ferry.

The fort has 26 artillery towers still intact. There are many cannons of native and European make rusting on the towers. Now in ruins, the fort in its heyday was a full-fledged living fort with all the necessary facilities, such as barracks, quarters for officers, a mosque, two small 60-foot-deep (18 m) fresh water ponds and so on. On the outer wall flanking the main gate, there is a sculpture depicting a tiger-like beast clasping elephants in its claws.

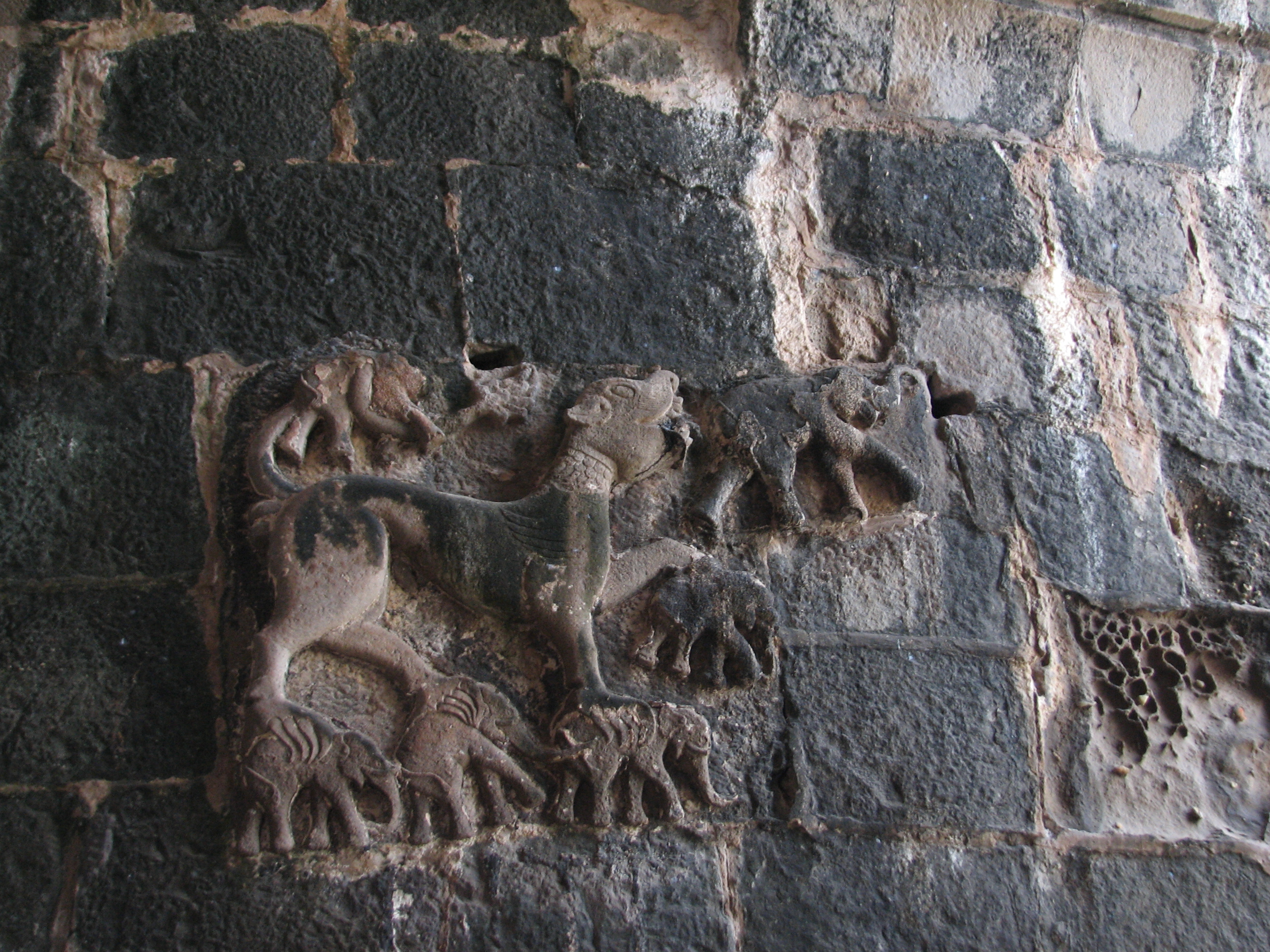
The sculpture on the main gate

The palace of the Nawabs of Janjira at Murud is still in good shape.

A special attraction of this fort are 3 gigantic cannons named Kalaal Baangadi, Chavri and Landa Kasam. These cannons were said to be feared for their shooting range. Another gate to the west is sea-facing, called 'Darya Darwaza'.

There is another fortress which is located on top of the hill around 32 km (20 mi) east of Murud-Janjira, named Ghosalgad, that was used as an outpost by the rulers of Janjira.

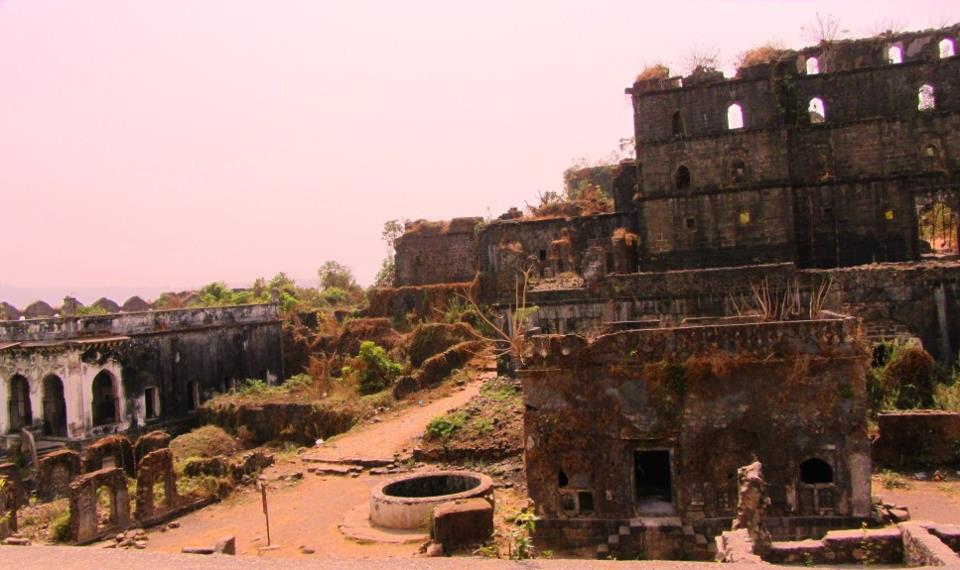
Inside the fort

During its heyday, the island fort boasted 572 cannons.

Visitors can gain access to the Janjira fort from Rajapuri, a small village on the coast. After a short ride in a small boat, one can enter the fort through the main entrance. The fort is oval shaped instead of the usual oblong or square shape. The fort wall is about 40 feet high and has 19 rounded porches or arches, some of which still have cannons mounted on them, including the famous cannon Kalaal Baangadi. These cannons were greatly responsible for repelling oncoming enemies from the sea. Inside the fort walls are the ruins of a mosque, a palace and bath with water channelled from streams. There is evidence that royal ladies occupied quarters here. A deep well, still functional, provides fresh water despite the fort being surrounded by salt water.

On the island's outer wall is a luxurious mansion, the Palace of the Nawab. Built by the former Nawab of Janjira, it commands a panoramic view of the Arabian sea and the Janjira sea fort.

== History ==
In early 1100 AD, the Abyssinian Sidis established the Janjira and Jafarabad state.

Major historical figures from Murud-Janjira include men such as Sidi Hilal, Yahya Saleh and Sidi Yaqub.

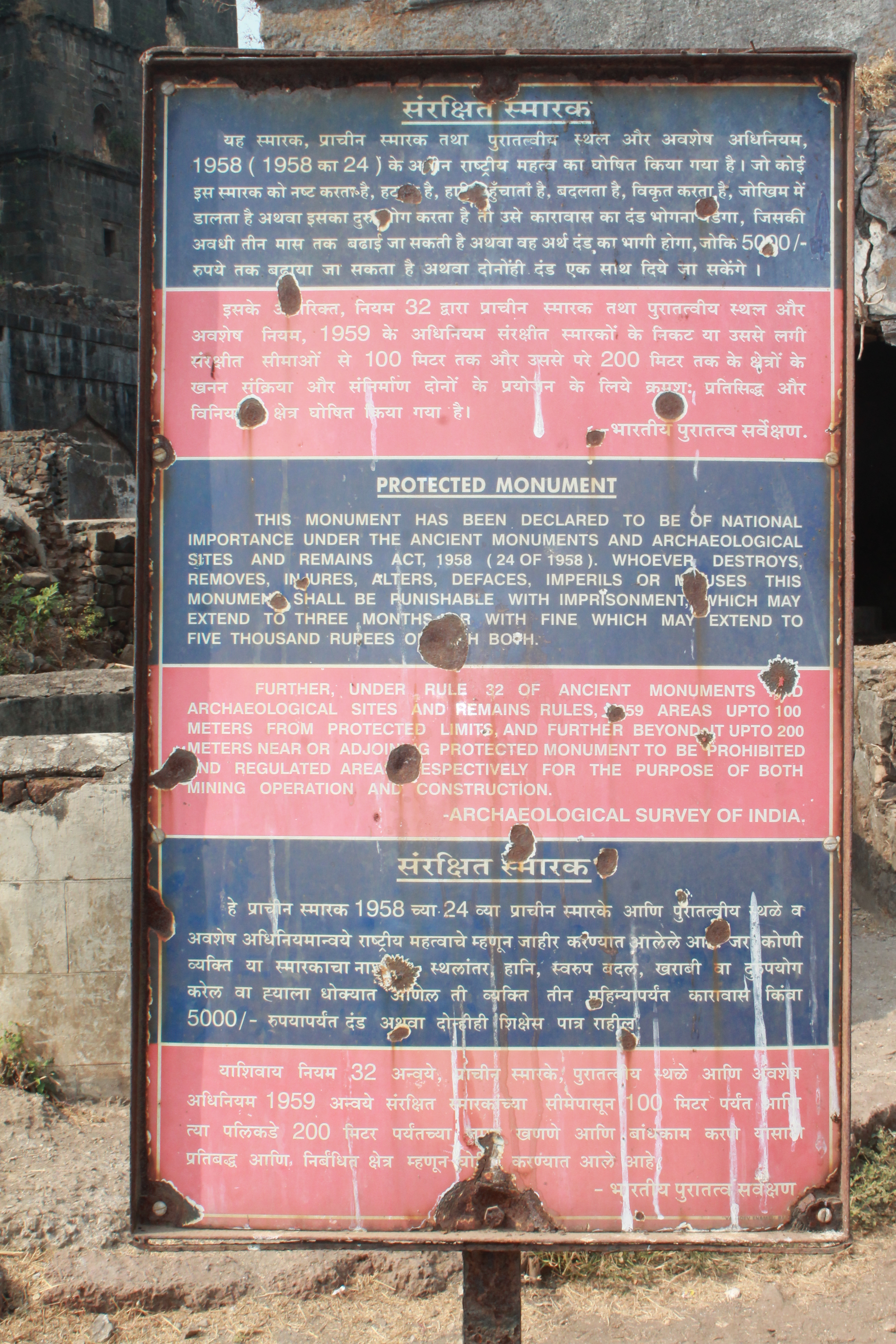
Archaeological Survey of India noticeboard at fort entrance

=== Itbarrao Koli & Malik Ambar of Janjira ===
Itbarrao Koli was the Patil of Janjira Island and a chief of the Kolis who built this island in the 15th century for Kolis to live on peacefully away from pirates. The origin the old Wooden Garrison can be traced down to the fifteenth century when some local fishermen of Rajapuri constructed a small wooden fort on a huge rock to protect themselves and their families from the pirates. However, the Nizam Shahi Sultan of Ahmadnagar Sultanate wanted to capture this wooden garrison purely for strategic reasons, and when his general Piram Khan captured it, Malik Ambar—his spokesperson who was also an Abyssinian regent of Siddi origin—decided to construct a solid rock fortress in place of the original wooden structure. This fort was originally called Jazeera Mahroob Jazeera.

The island fortress was under control of the Adil Shahi dynasty of Bijapur Sultanate until the reign of Ibrahim II when the Janjira fort was lost to the Siddis.

At some point, Yaqut Khan were appointed as Nawab of Janjira island state.

In 1539, According to accounts written by the Portuguese admiral Fernão Mendes Pinto, the Ottoman fleet that first arrived in Aceh (prior to the Ottoman expedition to Aceh led by Kurtoğlu Hızır Reis), included 200 Malabar sailors from Janjira to aid the region of Batak and Maritime Southeast Asia.

According to Ottoman records, a combined force from the Ottomans and Janjira mariners routed a Portuguese fleet in 1587 at Yemen. From this moment onwards Janjira played an important role in resisting Portuguese influence in the region.

In the late 1600's, during the rule of the Mughal emperor Aurangzeb, Sidi Yaqut received a subsidy of 400,000 rupees. He also owned large ships which weighed 300–400 tons. According to records, these ships were unsuitable for fighting on the open sea against European warships, but their size allowed for transporting soldiers for amphibious operations.

=== Independence ===
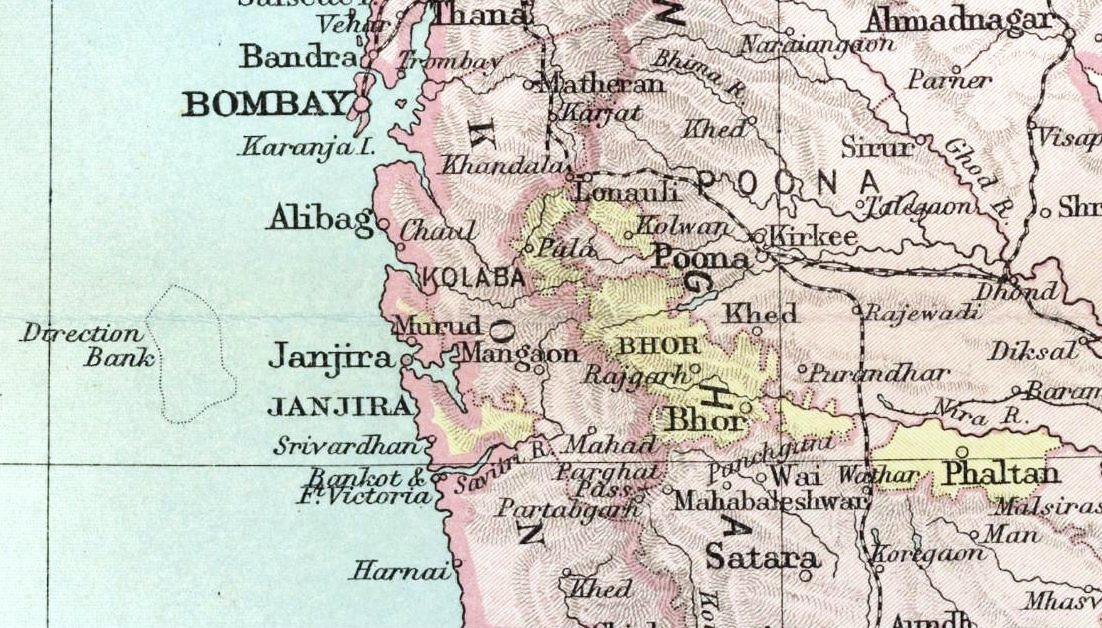
Map of Janjira with the Indian mainland

In 1621, the Siddis of Janjira became exceptionally powerful as an autonomous state to the point that the commander of Janjira, Siddi Ambar the Little, successfully defied his overlord Malik Ambar's attempt to replace him. Siddi Ambar the Little is accordingly considered the first Nawab of Janjira state.

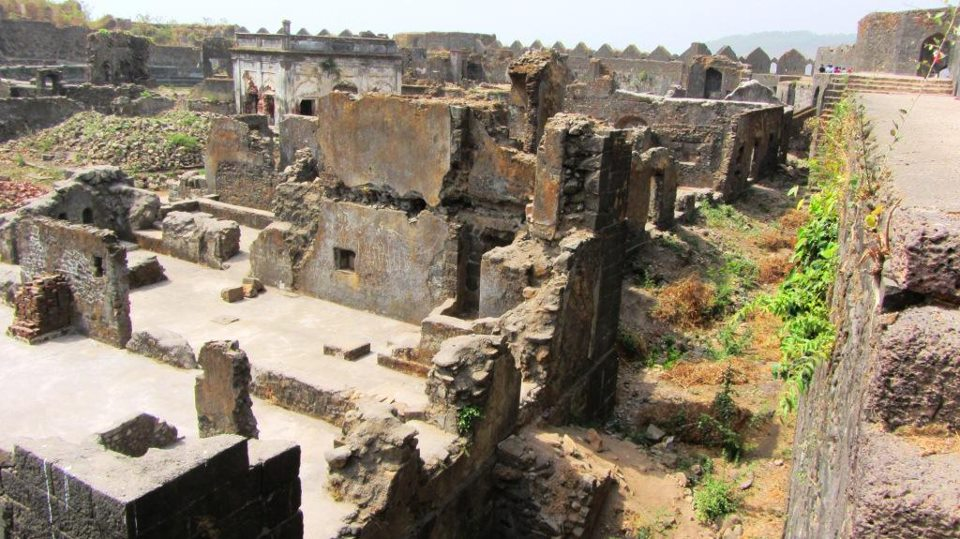
Janjira ruins

Despite repeated attempts by the Portuguese, the British and the Maratha to subdue the island fortress, all of these efforts failed to displace the island's Siddi rulers. The Siddis were themselves allied with the Mughal Empire.

One example of such a failed attack was the account of the 10,000 soldiers who were sent by the Maratha Peshwa Moropant Trimbak Pingle, and who were roundly repulsed by the Janjira army in 1676. During this Maratha assault, the Marathas, led by Chatrapati Shivaji Maharaj, attempted to scale the 12-meter-high (39 ft) granite walls but failed in their attempts. Chatrapati Shivaji maharaj's son Chatrapati Sambhaji Maharaj even attempted to tunnel his way into the fort and was very close to capturing the fort. His attempt was thwarted when a Mughal army attacked the Maratha capital city, forcing Sambhaji to withdraw his forces from the siege and return to the Maratha capital. He built another sea fort in 1676, known as Padmadurg or Kasa fort, to challenge Janjira. It is located northwest of Janjira. Padmadurg took 22 years to build and is constructed on 22 acres of land.

In January 1682, Sambhaji, the second Maratha ruler, laid siege against the Siddis of Janjira. He dispatched Dadaji Raghunath Deshpande, a Maratha general, to commence the operation and promised pledged to appoint him as one of the eight Pradhans of the Maratha empire if he successfully captured the Janjira fort. During the siege, Sambhaji tried different strategies such as assigning some of his allies to fake defection to the Janjira side, Filling a channel of eight hundred yards wide and thirty feet deep with stones and rock fragments, aiming to create a causeway for the assaulting parties.

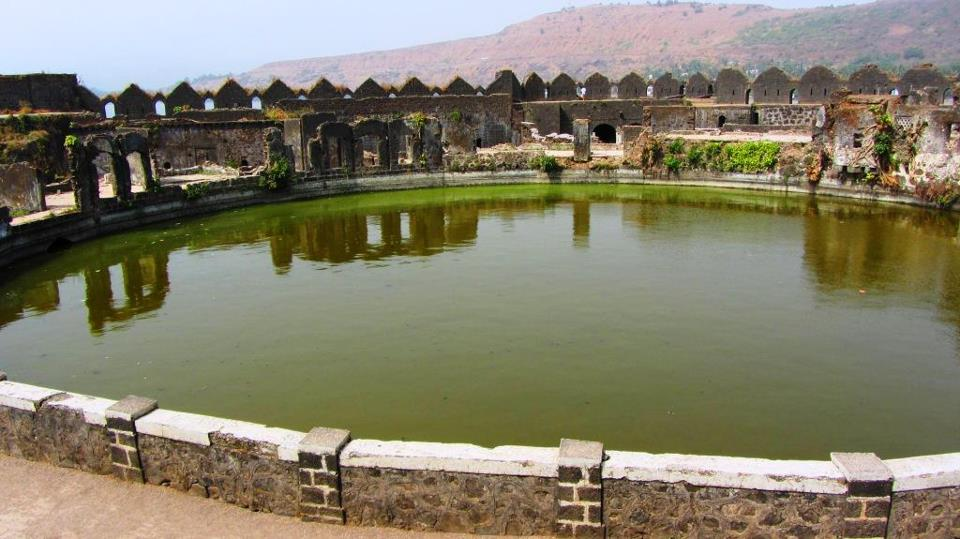
The small freshwater pond inside Janjira fort

Around 1731, the local Thanedar (ruler) who was an ally in the Muslim Mughal garrison, declared independence. Thereafter the Thanedar and the local Kolis were devoted to piracy, repeatedly attacking ships and disturbing commercial traffic from Surat. Sidi Hilal, the prince of the dynasty of Janjira which was then ruling Surat, attacked the Kolis, destroyed their boats and captured them demanding a hefty fine.

In the year 1736, the Siddis of Murud-Janjira set out in a battle with the forces of the Peshwa Baji Rao. On 19 April 1736, the Maratha warriors Nanaji Surve and Chimaji Appa attacked the gathering forces in the encampments of the Siddis near Rewas. Chimaji Appa advised Siddi Sat to run from battle field otherwise Nanajirao will have no mercy on him but Siddi Sat captured Nanajirao Surve and took him to Sagargad fort. Nanajirao rescued himself and beheaded Siddi Sat along with his entire family and his army. Nanajirao Surve was rewarded with village name Kusgao. When the confrontation ended, 1,500 Siddis, including their leader Siddi Sat, had been killed. Peace was brokered in September 1736, but the Siddis were confined to only Janjira, Gowalkot, and Anjanvel, with their power greatly reduced. The forts of Gowalkot and Anjanvel were then captured by Tulaji Angre in 1745, and the Siddis only remaining possession was the island of Janjira. However, Janjira remained unconquered until it became part of Indian territory after independence from the British in 1947.

== Gallery ==
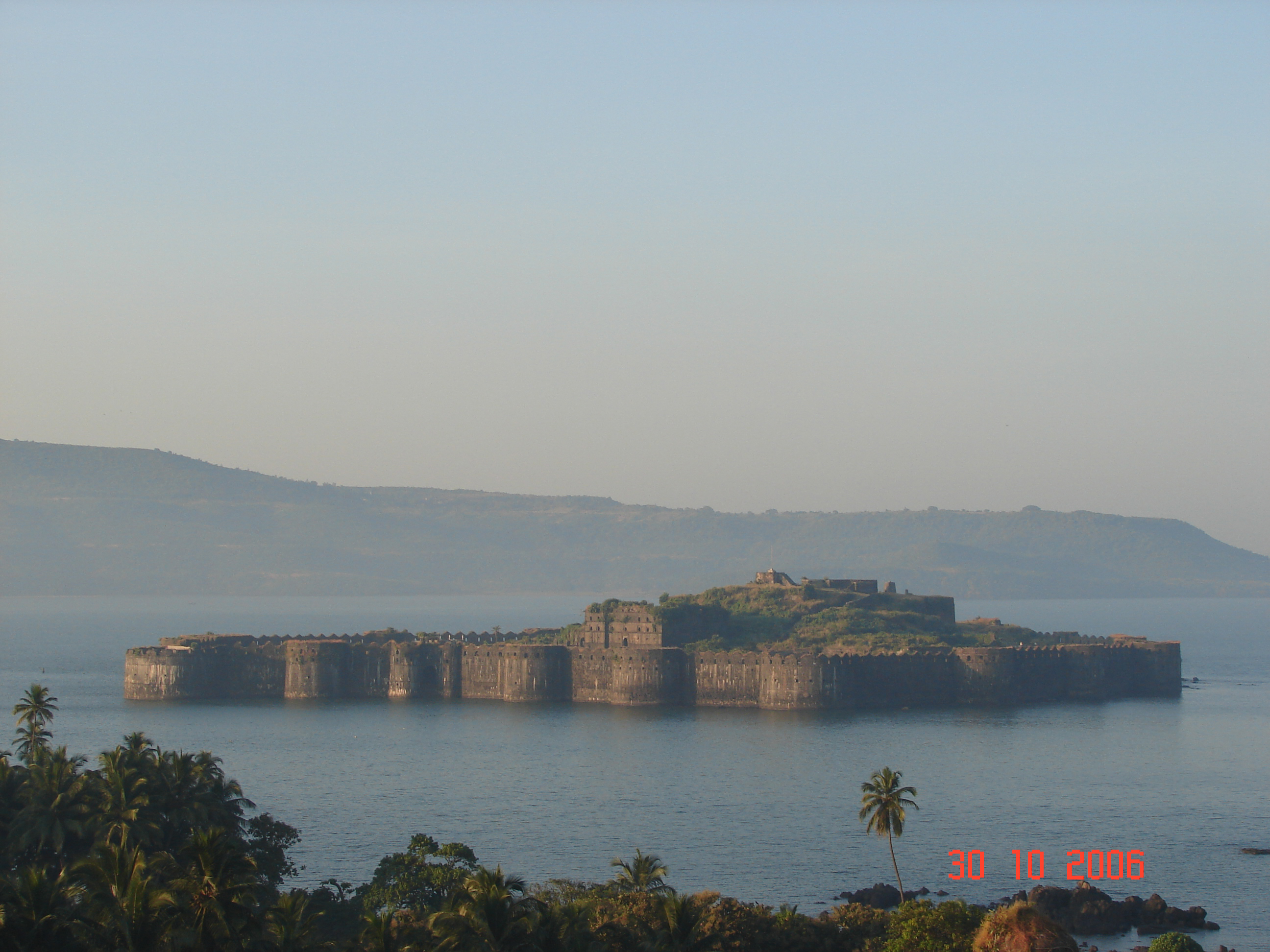
Janjira fort - panorama

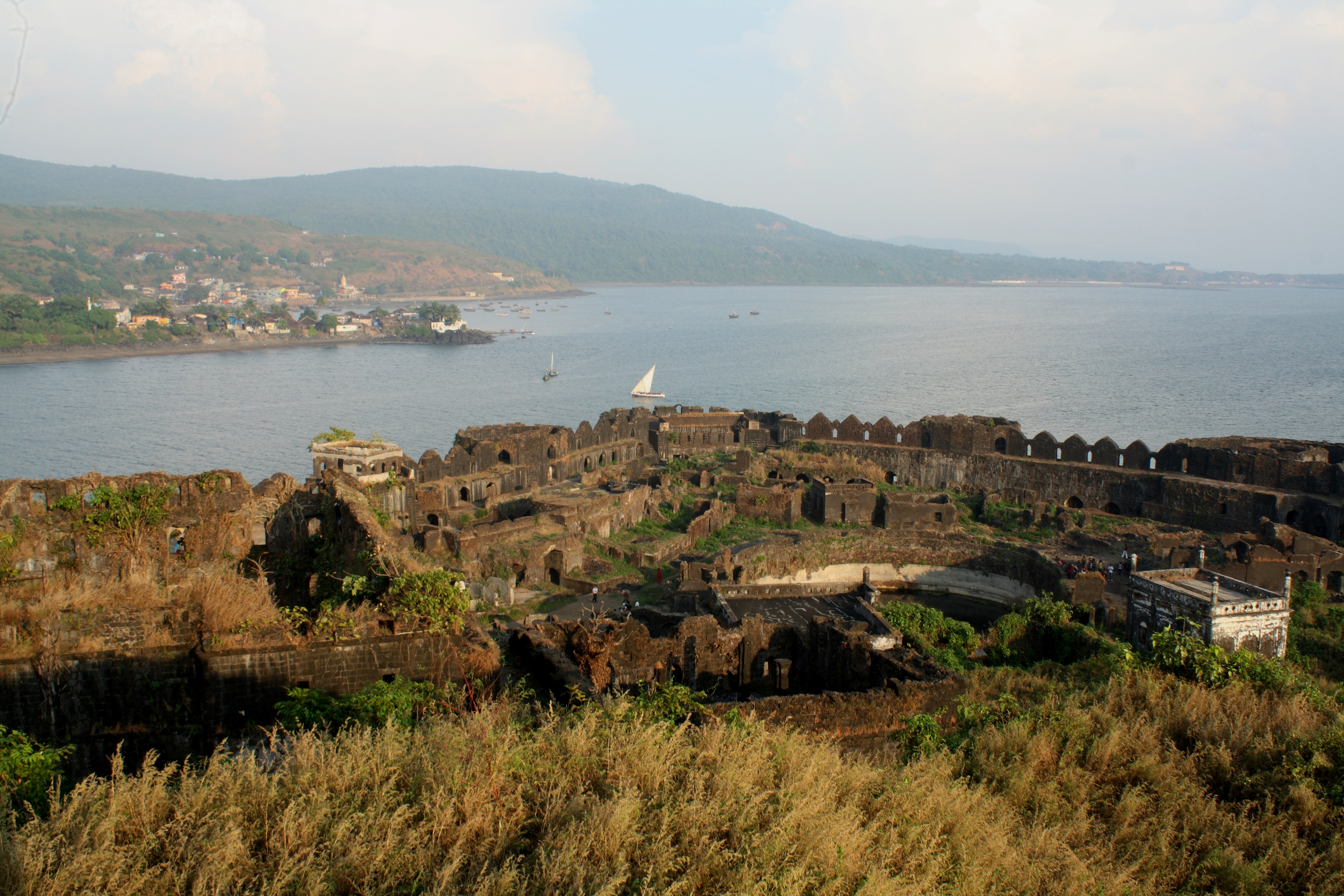
Inside complex of Janjira fort

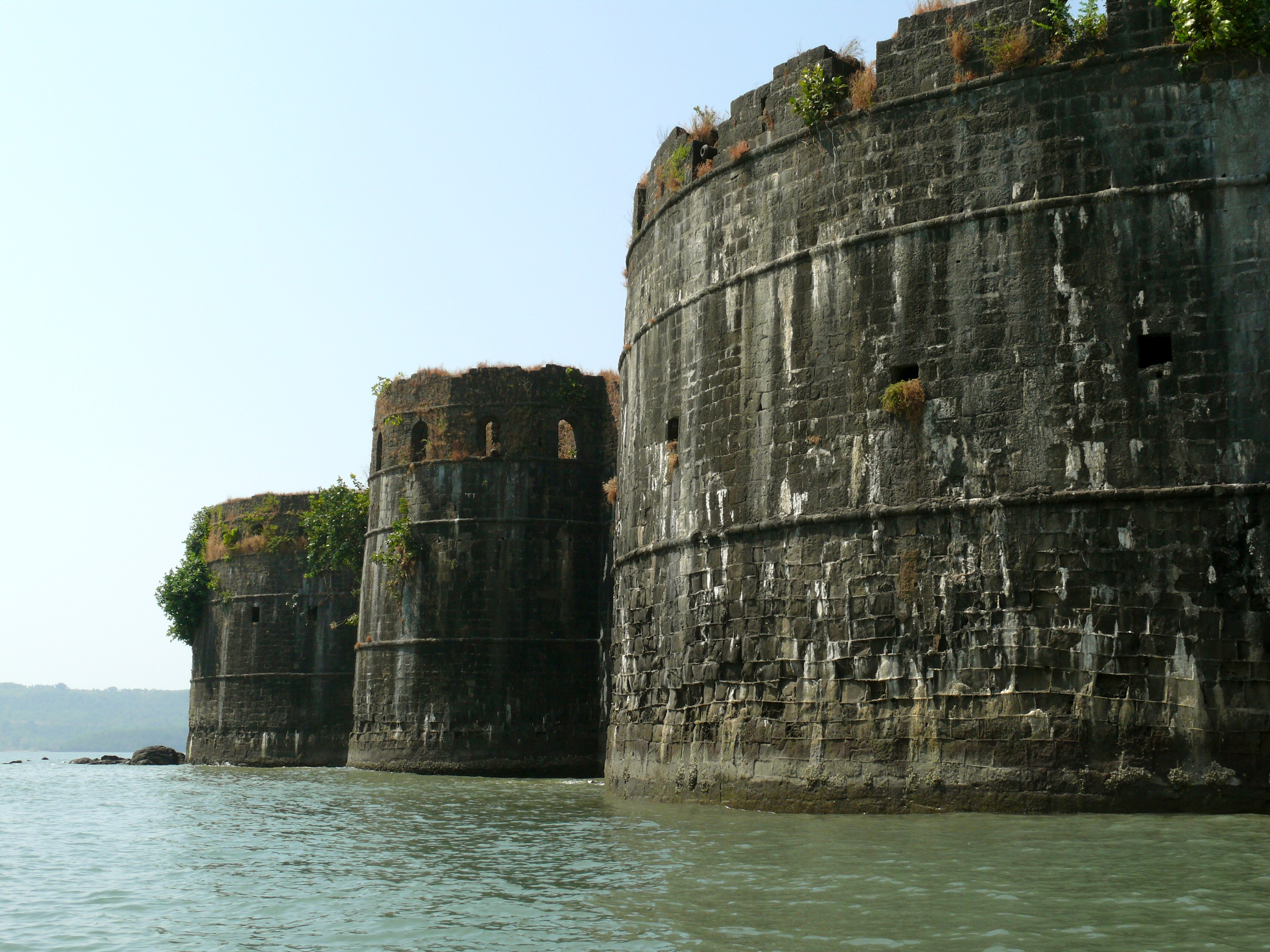
Bastion of Janjira fort

== See also ==
- Murud
- List of Indian Princely States
- List of forts in Maharashtra
- Khokri Tombs
- Janjira State
- Jafarabad State
- Maratha Navy
- Siege of Janjira

== Sources ==
- Imperial Gazetteer of India, 2. A., 26 Bde., Oxford 1908–1931
- Malleson, G.B.: An Historical Sketch of the Native States of India, London 1875, Reprint Delhi 1984
- Schwartzberg, Joseph E., Hrsg.: A Historical Atlas of South Asia, 2. A., New York/Oxford 1992, ISBN 0-19-506869-6
- http://www.maharashtratourism.gov.in/MTDC/HTML/MaharashtraTourism/TouristDelight/Forts/Forts.aspx?strpage=Murud_JanjiraForts.html Maharashtra - Murud Janjira Forts Official Govt. Page
