= Anglo-Mughal war (1686–1690) =

First Anglo-Indian war, 1686–1680

Child’s War
- Part of the Anglo-Indian wars
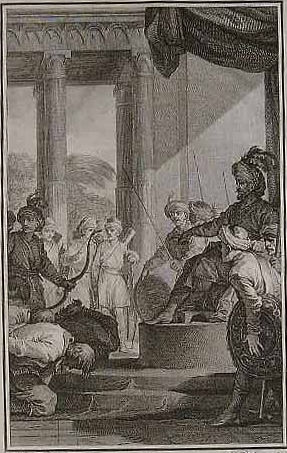
- French illustration of Sir Josiah Child requesting a pardon from the Emperor Aurangzeb
Date	January 1686 – February 1690
Location	Various parts of present-day India
Result	Mughal victory

Belligerents
East India Company	Mughal Empire

Commanders and leaders
Josiah Child; Thomas Pitt; Job Charnock	Aurangzeb; Shaista Khan; Daud Khan Panni; Yakut Khan

Strength
Total: 3,300: Including 150 Portuguese, 600 Bengali mercenaries; 2,300 at Bombay; 1,000 at Madras	Total: 980,000: ~500,000 professional army; ~400,000 militia; ~50,000 Heavy Cavalry; ~30,000 War Elephants; Siege of Bombay: 14,000 total

Casualties and losses
Bombay: ~115 deserters; ~2,000 killed; Madras Unknown	Total Light to none

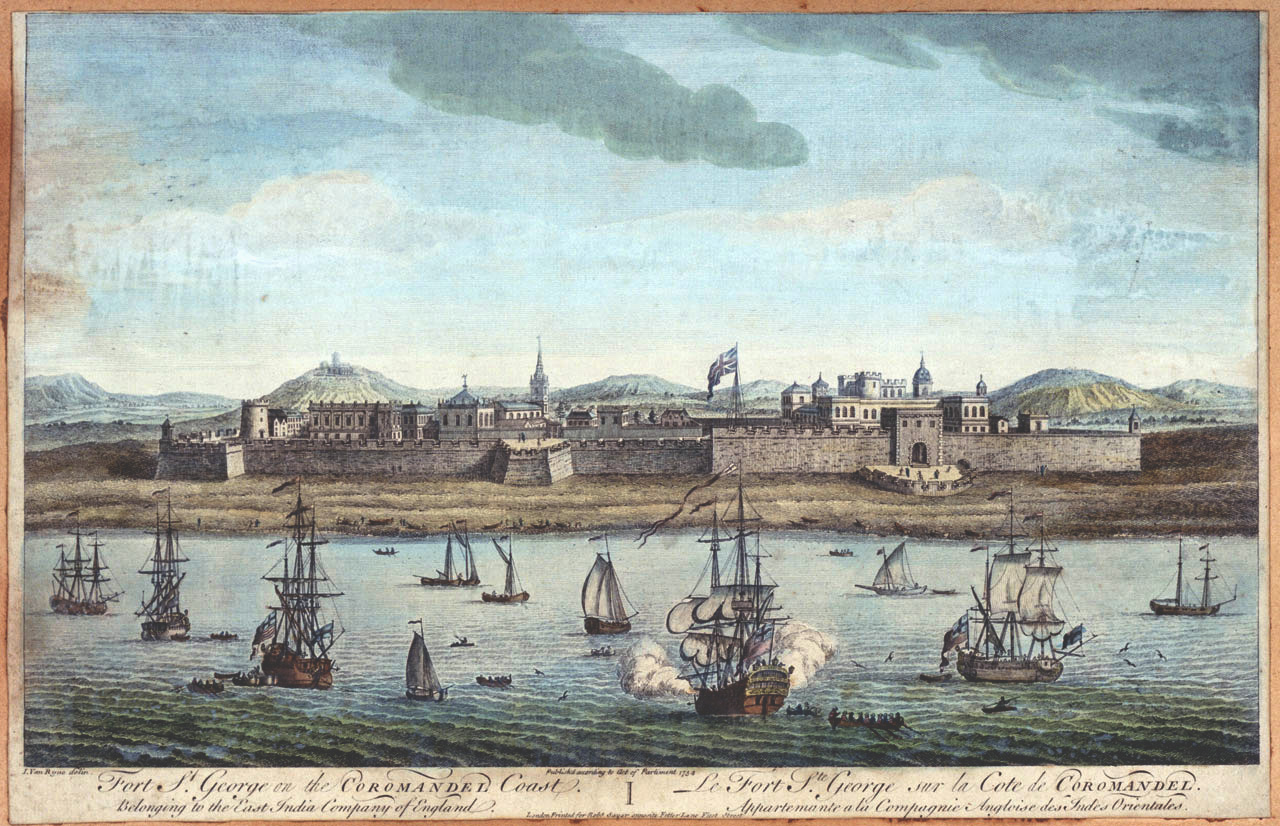
In 1702 Daud Khan, the Mughal Empire's local Subahdar of the Carnatic, besieged and blockaded Fort St George in Madras for more than three months; the governor of the fort, Thomas Pitt, was instructed by the East India Company to sue for peace.

The Anglo-Mughal war, also known as the Child's War, was the first Anglo-Indian war on the Indian subcontinent.

The English East India Company had been given a monopoly and numerous fortified bases on the western and south-eastern coasts of the Mughal Empire by the Crown, which was permitted by the local governors. In 1682, William Hedges was sent on behalf of the Company to negotiate with the governor of the proto-industrialised Bengal Subah, Shaista Khan, and to obtain a firman, an imperial decree that would allow the English company regular trading privileges across the Mughal provinces.

In 1685, after some breaking of negotiations by Josiah Child, the Governor of Bengal reacted by increasing the tributaries of the trade with the north-east from 2% to 3.5%. The company refused the newly introduced taxes and began to try to get the province of Bengal to accept new terms in favour of the trading power and expressed to capture Chittagong. They also planned to establish fortified enclaves throughout the region, and attain independence of the surrounding subah from the Mughal territory by bringing the local governors and the Hooghly River under their control, which would later allow formation of relationships with the Kingdom of Mrauk U based in Arakan (today's Myanmar) and hold substantial power in the Bay of Bengal.

Upon the Company's request, King James II sent 12 warships to help out the company rule in India, but the expedition failed as he was overthrown by William III in 1688, whose reign was hostile to the company. Following the dispatch of twelve warships loaded with troops, a number of battles took place, leading to the siege of Bombay Harbour and bombardment of the city of Balasore. New peace treaties were negotiated, and the East India Company sent petitions to the emperor, Aurangzeb, about trade involving the Portuguese at Hooghly and religious intolerance of the Tamil community in Madras, but praised Aurangzeb's imperial majesty and compared him with ancient Persia's emperors Cyrus and Darius. However, the company eventually failed to reach an agreement.

The English naval forces established a blockade of the Mughal ports on the western Indian coast, engaged in several battles with the Mughal Army, and captured ships with Muslim pilgrims journeying to Mecca.

The blockade started to affect major cities like Chittagong, Madras and Mumbai (Bombay), which resulted in the intervention of Emperor Aurangzeb, who seized all the factories of the company and arrested members of the East India Company Army, while the Company forces commanded by Josiah Child captured further Mughal trading ships.

Ultimately the Company was forced to concede by the armed forces of the Mughal Empire and the company was fined 150,000 rupees (roughly equivalent to today's $4.4 million). The company's apology was accepted and the trading privileges were restored by Aurangzeb.

== Background ==
In 1682 the English East India Company sent William Hedges to Shaista Khan, the Mughal governor of Bengal Subah, in order to obtain a firman, an imperial directive that would grant the Company regular trading privileges throughout the Mughal Empire. The intervention of the company's governor in London, Josiah Child, with Hedges's mission caused Emperor Aurangzeb to break off the negotiations. After that Child decided to go to war against the Mughals.

== Events ==
In 1685, Admiral Nicholson was sent out with twelve warships, carrying 200 pieces of cannon and 600 men, to be reinforced by 400 men from Madras. His instructions were to capture and fortify Chittagong, with 200 additional guns placed on board, to demand the cession of the encompassing territory, to conciliate the Zamindars and Taluqdars, to establish a mint, and to enter into a treaty with the ruler of Arakan. But the fleet was dispersed during the voyage, and several of the vessels entered the Hooghly instead of steering to Chittagong, joining English troops from Madras, and anchoring off the Company's factory.

The arrival of the formidable expedition alarmed Shaista Khan, and he offered to compromise his differences with the English; but an unforeseen event brought the negotiation to an abrupt close. Three English soldiers, strolling through the marketplace of Hooghly, quarrelled with Mughal officials, and were severely beaten. After that, Nicholson dispatched a force to capture the town.

In 1686, new negotiations started in Chuttanutty which the Mughals intentionally prolonged till their troops could be assembled to attack the English encampment, and English commander Job Charnock retired with his soldiers and establishments to the island of Ingelee, at the mouth of the Hooghly River. It was a low and deadly swamp, covered with long grass, without any fresh water. In three months, half of the English troops had died from disease.

In 1688, an English fleet was dispatched to blockade the Mughal harbours in the Arabian Sea on the western coast of India. Merchantmen containing Muslim pilgrims to Mecca (as part of the hajj) were among those captured. Upon hearing of the blockade, Emperor Aurangzeb resumed negotiations with the English. However, the Company sent out reinforcements commanded by Captain Heath who on his arrival disallowed the treaty then pending and proceeded to Balasore which he bombarded unsuccessfully. He then sailed to Chittagong; but finding the fortifications stronger than he had anticipated, landed at Madras.

After that, Emperor Aurangzeb issued orders for the occupation of the East India Company's possessions across the subcontinent, and the confiscation of their property. As a result, possessions of East India Company were reduced to the fortified towns of Madras and Bombay.

In 1689, the strong Mughal fleet from Janjira commanded by Sidi Yaqub and composed of Siddi from the Ethiopia blockaded the East India Company fort in Bombay. After a year of resistance, a famine broke out due to the blockade, the Company surrendered, and in 1690 the company sent envoys to Aurangzeb's court to plea for a pardon and to renew the trade firman. The company's envoys had to prostrate themselves before the emperor, pay a large imperial fine of 150,000 rupees, and promise better behavior in the future. Emperor Aurangzeb then ordered Sidi Yaqub to lift the siege of Bombay and the company subsequently re-established itself in Bombay and set up a new base in Calcutta.

== See also ==
- Henry Every
- Thomas Tew
- Battle of Buxar
- Sloop
