= Ram Patil =

King of Janjira Island

Raja Ram Rao Patil
- Patil of Janjira
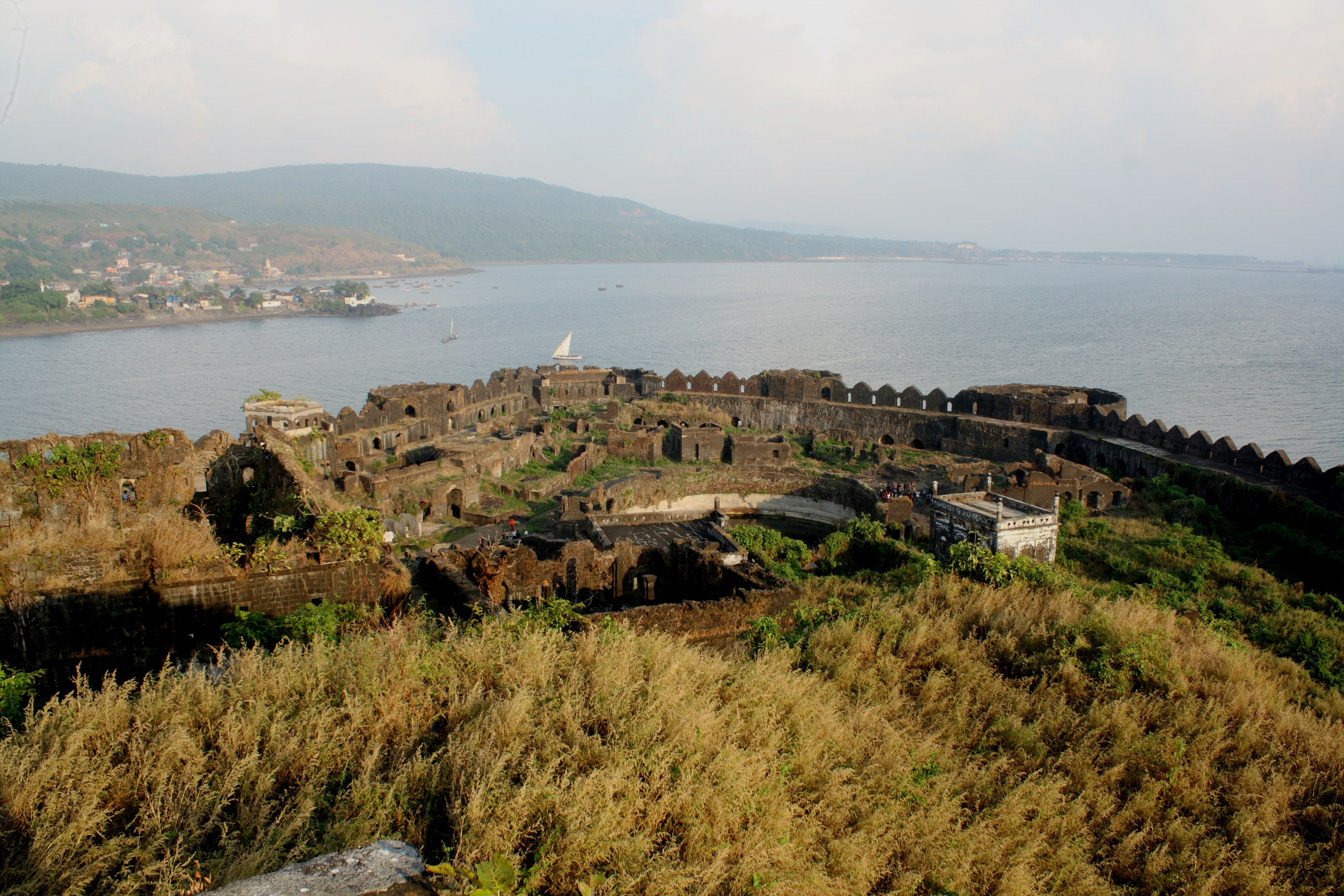
- Janjira Fort
- Born: Itbarrao Koli; Ahmednagar, Ahmednagar Sultanate
- Died: 1489; Janjira, Ahmadnagar Sultanate
- Meherban Shrimant Raja Ramrao Patil of Janjira
- Dynasty: Patil
- Religion: Hinduism
- Occupation: Admiral of Ahmadnagar Navy

The Raja Ram Rao Patil(Koli) or Itbarrao Koli was an Admiral of the Ahmadnagar Navy and Koli ruler of Janjira. Patil built and fortified the Janjira Island.

== History ==
He was Koli Admiral of the Ahmadnagar Navy and built the Janjira with permission of Sultan Nizam of Ahmadnagar Sultanate. But later he refused to obey the orders of the Sultan. In 1489, The Ahmadnagar ruler appointed his new admiral called Piram Khan or Bhairam Khan and ordered to capture Janjira from Ramrao Patil. Piram Khan marched from Surat but not dare to attack at Patil so made plans to enter in to janjira. Piram Khan and his Muslim Siddi member disguised as merchants and requested to the Patil for keep their three hundred large boxes containing silk and wine at island safe, and the request was granted. After that, Piram Khan thanked him and gave a him alcohol (wine). When all of the soldiers and Ram Rao Patil were drunk, he attacked at Janjira and captured it from Patil.
