= Yahya Saleh =

16th century Muslim sailor and voyager

Yahya Saleh was a Mughal Admiral and voyager from Surat. He was a navigator and devout Muslim sailor. He entered Mughal service during the rule of Akbar and in 1577 was trusted to lead members of the Mughal Emperor's personal harem to the Islamic holy cities of Mecca and Medina. Yahya Saleh continued to lead pilgrimages for the next three years until 1580, and present gifts and Sadaqah to humble authorities of Mecca and Medina.

He probably aided Ottoman Admiral Hadım Suleiman Pasha and his fleet of 70 Xebecs during the siege of Diu in 1538. He objected and resented Akbar's relations with the Portuguese at Diu and Goa. He made personal efforts to defend both Surat and Janjira from any impending Portuguese threat.
