= Murud, Raigad =

Murud Murud-Janjira, MJ
- Town
- Location in Maharashtra, India
- Coordinates: 18°19′22.738″N 72°57′44.11″E
- Country: India
- State: Maharashtra
- District: Raigad
- Taluka: Murud
- Established: 1888

Government
  - Type: Municipal Council
  - Body: Murud Municipal Council
  - Mayor: Aaradhna Dandekar (Ncp)
- Elevation: 7 m (23 ft)

Population (2024)
  - Total: 15,658

Languages
  - Official: Marathi
- Time zone: UTC+5:30 (IST)
- Postal code: 402401
- Telephone code: 02144
- Vehicle registration: MH-06
- Website: http://www.murudjanjira.com/

Murud is a town and a municipal council in Raigad district in the Indian state of Maharashtra. Situated at a distance of 150 km (93 mi) from Mumbai, Murud is a tourist destination. The Palace of Nawab is located in Murud. The palace was built in 1885 for administration purposes. The palace is still owned by the descendants of the Nawab and is a private property.

== About ==
Murud is known for a notable beach, and for its proximity to Janjira off the coast of Rajapuri, a sea fort. Murud-Janjira is the local name for a fort situated at the coastal City of Murud, in the Raigad district of Maharashtra, India. It is notable for being the only fort along India's western coast that remained undefeated despite Dutch and English East India Company attacks.

== History ==
Murud–Janjira rose to prominence under the Siddis, who first occupied the fort while serving the Bahmani Sultanate of Ahmednagar. During this period, the influential Habshi statesman Malik Ambar (1550–1626) held senior office and played a major role in Deccan politics. Rivalries within the Bahmani courts—particularly between Indian Muslim and foreign Muslim factions—led the Sultans to support emerging Maratha leaders as a balancing force, contributing indirectly to the rise of Chhatrapati Shivaji Maharaj and the Maratha Empire.

Malik Ambar later became Prime Minister of the Ahmadnagar Sultanate and is credited with implementing a systematic revenue settlement across much of the Deccan. As the Ahmadnagar kingdom fell to the combined forces of the Bijapur Sultanate and the Mughal Empire, the Siddis shifted their allegiance accordingly: first to Bijapur and, after Bijapur's defeat, to the Mughals.

Although nominally vassals of these larger powers, the Siddis exercised considerable autonomy. They served within the naval forces of their patrons and were responsible for safeguarding Muslim maritime interests, including pilgrimage routes for Hajj and Umrah. At the same time, they operated independently along the coast, relying in part on maritime raids and piracy. These activities brought them into conflict with regional powers, yet despite repeated attempts by the Portuguese, Dutch, and the Marathas, Janjira Fort remained unconquered. Many large-scale assaults were abandoned after intervention by a third power—often the Mughals—who diverted the attackers by pressuring them elsewhere.

With the decline of the Deccan sultanates and the expansion of British influence, the Siddi rulers of Murud–Janjira accepted British paramountcy under the Subsidiary Alliance system. The last ruler, HH Nawab Sidi Muhammed Khan II Sidi Ahmad Khan, was known as a patron of arts and culture and supported musicians such as Beenkar Abid Hussain Khan. Murud–Janjira remained a princely state until 1947, when its ruler acceded to the newly independent Indian Union. The territory then became part of Bombay Presidency and was later incorporated into the modern State of Maharashtra.

=== Maratha attempts to capture Janjira ===
In 1682, Chhatrapati Sambhaji Maharaj launched a major campaign against Janjira. He operated from Padmadurg, a nearby fort constructed by Chhatrapati Shivaji Maharaj to counter Siddi naval activities. Sambhaji sent the commander Kondaji Farzand into Janjira on a covert mission. Posing as a defector following a dispute with Sambhaji, Kondaji sought to destroy the fort’s ammunition store and weaken its defenses. The plot failed, and Kondaji was captured and executed; his severed head was later sent to Sambhaji.

In response, Sambhaji prepared a large-scale naval assault, assembling a fleet of about 200 boats equipped with cannons. Before the attack could be completed, Emperor Aurangzeb redirected Sambhaji’s attention by sending Mughal forces toward Kalyan. Sambhaji moved to defend the region, forcing the Marathas to abandon the Janjira campaign. Although the operation did not succeed militarily, it left a lasting psychological impact on the Siddis, who remained cautious of further Maratha attempts.

== Geography ==
Murud is located at 18.33°N 72.96°E. It has an average elevation of 7 metres (26 feet).

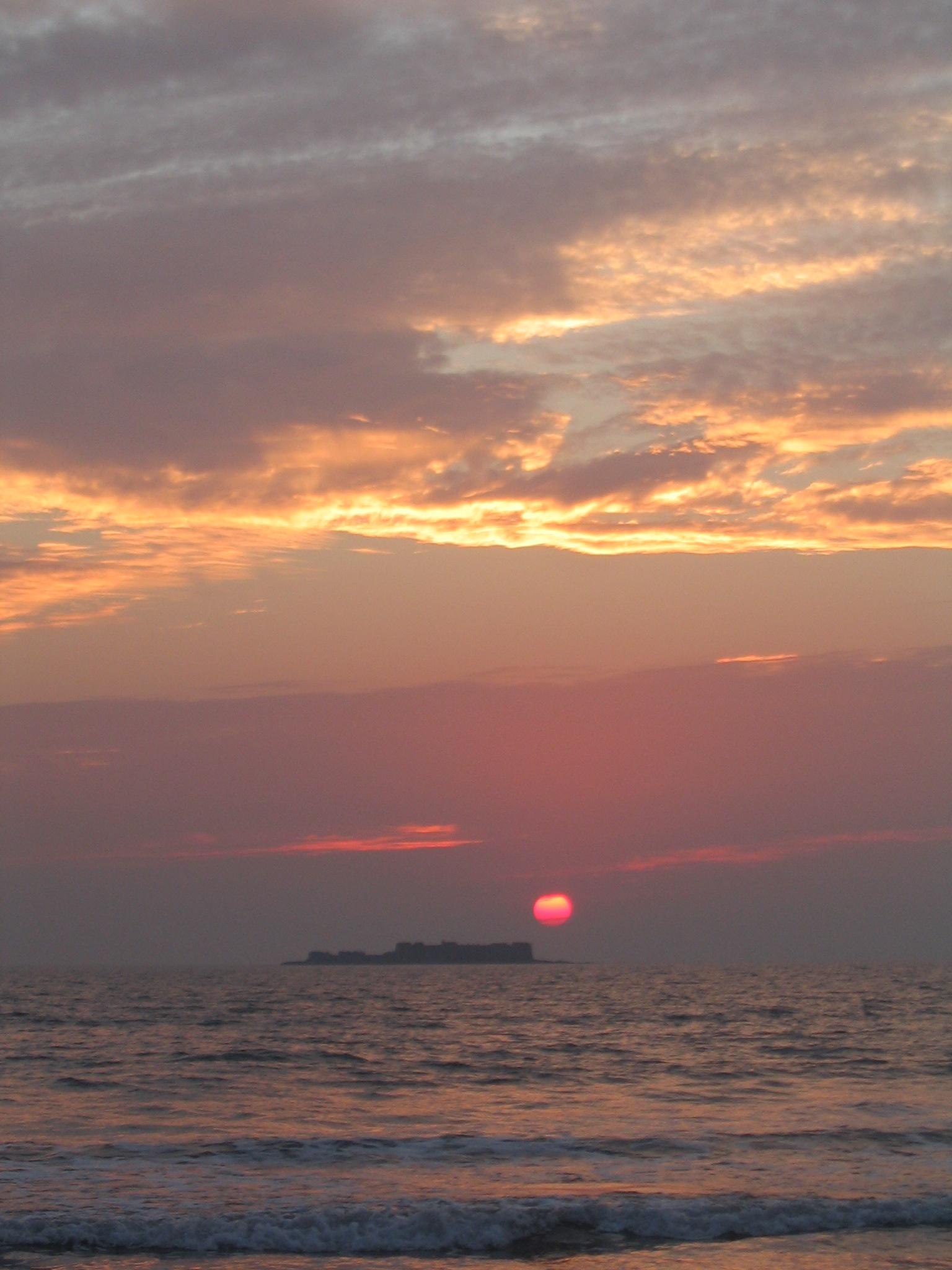
Sunset over Kasa fort

== Demographics ==
As of 2001 India census, Murud had a population of 12,551. Males constitute 48% of the population and females 52%. In Murud, 11% of the population is under 6 years of age.

== Local food productions ==
Seafood: prawns, surumai, pomfret, kingfish, mackerel, crab, lobster. Vegetables: eggplant (brinjal), sweet potato, sugarcane, onions, garlic. Cereals: rice. Fruits: coconut, mango, watermelon, bananas, jack fruit, kokum. Nuts: Betel nut, cashew nut. Spices: black pepper. Fish surmai, rawas prons lobster octopus bombay duck(bombil)

== Education ==
Below are the famous schools in Murud City

- Omkar Vidya Mandir
- Sir.S.A.Highschool and M.L.D.College
- Anjuman Islam Highschool and Degree College
- Vasantrao Naik College Of Arts & Commerce
- Nachiketas Public School
- Suvidya Public School
- Pioneer Public School
- Mehboob English medium School
- Vaishali Nikatan Vihoor

== Hospitals ==
- Murud Rural Hospital(F.B.Hospital)
- L.K.B.Hospital
- Kalyani Hospital
- Muqbool Narsing Home and Hospital
- Shree Clinic

== Ports ==
- Agardanda Terminal (5 km south)
- Dighi Port (5 km south)
