= List of Anglo–Indian wars =

The Anglo-Indian wars were the several wars fought in the Indian subcontinent, over a period of time, between the British East India Company and different Indian states, mainly the Mughal Empire, Rohilkhand, Kingdom of Mysore, Subah of Bengal, Maratha Confederacy, Sikh Empire of Punjab, Kingdom of Sindh and others. These wars led to the establishment of British colonial rule in India.

== List of wars ==
The list excludes single sieges and major battles:

- Anglo-Mughal war (1686–1690)
- First Carnatic War (1746–1748)
- Second Carnatic War (1749–1754)
- Polygar Wars (1752–1847)
- Third Carnatic War (1756–1763)
- Bengal War (1756–1765)
  - Battle of Plassey (1757)
- First Anglo-Mysore War (1767–1769)
- Chuar Rebellion (1767–1834)
- Sannyasi Rebellion (1770–1777)
- First Anglo-Maratha War (1775–1782)
- Second Anglo-Mysore War (1780–1784)
- Bihar Revolt (1781)
- Third Anglo-Mysore War (1790–1792)
- Fourth Anglo-Mysore War (1798–1799)
- Second Anglo-Maratha War (1803–1806)
- Vellore Mutiny (1806)
- Anglo-Nepalese War (1814–1816)
- Paika Rebellion (1817)
- Third Anglo-Maratha War (1817–1818)
- Barrackpore mutiny of 1824
- First Anglo-Burmese War (1824–1826)
- Kol uprising (1831–1832)
- Bhumij Revolt (1832–1833)
- Panchayati Revolution (1842–1845)
- Gwalior campaign (1843)
- British conquest of Sindh (1843)
- First Anglo-Sikh War (1845–1846)
- Second Anglo-Sikh War (1848–1849)
- Second Anglo-Burmese War (1852–1853)
- Santal rebellion (1855–1856)
- Indian Rebellion of 1857 (1857–1858)
- Ambela Pass campaign (1863)
- Third Anglo-Burmese War (1885)
- Hazara expedition (1888)
- Anglo Manipur War (1891)
- Hunza–Nagar Campaign (1891)
- Chitral Expedition (1895)
- 1897 Frontier Revolt
  - Tochi Valley Expedition (1897–1898)
  - Malakand Uprising (1897)
  - First Mohmand campaign (1897–1898)
  - Tirah campaign (1897–1898)
- Bazar Valley (1908)
- Mohmand Blockade (1916–1917)
- Waziristan campaign (1921–1924)
- Pink's War (1925)
- Waziristan campaign (1936–1939)
- Burma campaign (1944)
  - Operation U-Go (1944)
  - Battle of Imphal (1944)
  - Battle of Kohima (1944)
  - Battle of the Admin Box (1944)
  - Battle of Pokoku and Irrawaddy River operations (1945)
  - Battle of Central Burma (1945)
- Royal Indian Navy Mutiny (1946)

== See also ==
- Indian War (disambiguation)
- List of wars involving the Mughal Empire
- List of wars involving India
- Afghan–Sikh wars
- Mughal–Maratha wars
- Mughal–Rajput wars
- Ahom–Mughal conflicts
- Chola–Chalukya wars
- Ancient Hindu wars
- List of battles of Rajasthan
- Battles involving the Maratha Empire
- List of battles involving the Sikh Empire
- Military history of the North-West Frontier
- List of early Hindu–Muslim military conflicts in the Indian subcontinent
