= Jafarabad State =

Former state in British Raj (c. 1650–1948)

Coordinates: 20.8667°N 71.3667°E

Jafarabad State Jafrabad State જાફરાબાદ રિયાસત
- Princely State of British India; In union with Janjira (1759–1948)
- c. 1650–1948
- Flag

- Location of Jafrabad State in Saurashtra
- Area
  - 1901: 68 km^{2} (26 sq mi)
- Population
  - 1901: 12,097
- History
  - Established: 17 March
  - Indian independence: 1948
Succeeded by
India
- Today part of: Gujarat, India

Jafarabad, or Jafrabad State, was a tributary princely state in India during the British Raj. It was located in the Kathiawar Peninsula on the Gujarat coast. The state had formerly been part of the Baroda Agency and later of the Kathiawar Agency of the Bombay Presidency.

Jafrabad State was a dependency of the Nawab of Janjira State, located 320 km to the south-southeast on the Konkan coast.

Jafrabad town, the capital and only municipality, is located 275 km south of Ahmedabad and 240 southwest of Baroda. The state was formed by the city and 11 villages and initially consisted of two districts located on both sides of the estuary of the Ranai river. Jafrabad state had an area of 68 km^{2} and a population in 1881 of 4,746 and in 1901 of 6,038 inhabitants. The majority of the population were Muslims (80%) and the rest Hindus. The state and the town took their name from Sultan Muzaffar Jafar from Gujarat who built fortifications.

== History ==
Jafarabad State was founded around 1650. On 6 December 1733 the ruler of Jafarabad State signed a defensive and offensive treaty with the British East India Company. In 1759, the Jafarabad and Janjira states entered into a personal union. Finally in 1834 Jafarabad State became a British protectorate.

Around 1731 when the Mughal Empire rule was relaxed in Gujarat, the local Thanedar (ruler) who was an ally in the Muslim Mughal garrison became independent. Thereafter the Thanedar and the local Kolis were devoted to piracy, repeatedly attacking ships and disturbing commercial traffic from Surat. Sidi Hilal, the prince of the dynasty of Janjira which was then ruling Surat, attacked the Kolis, destroyed their boats and captured them demanding a hefty fine.

== See also ==
- Janjira State
- Political integration of India
- Western India States Agency
