= Padmadurg =

Historical fort in India

- Part of Raigad Fort
- Raigad, Maharastra, India
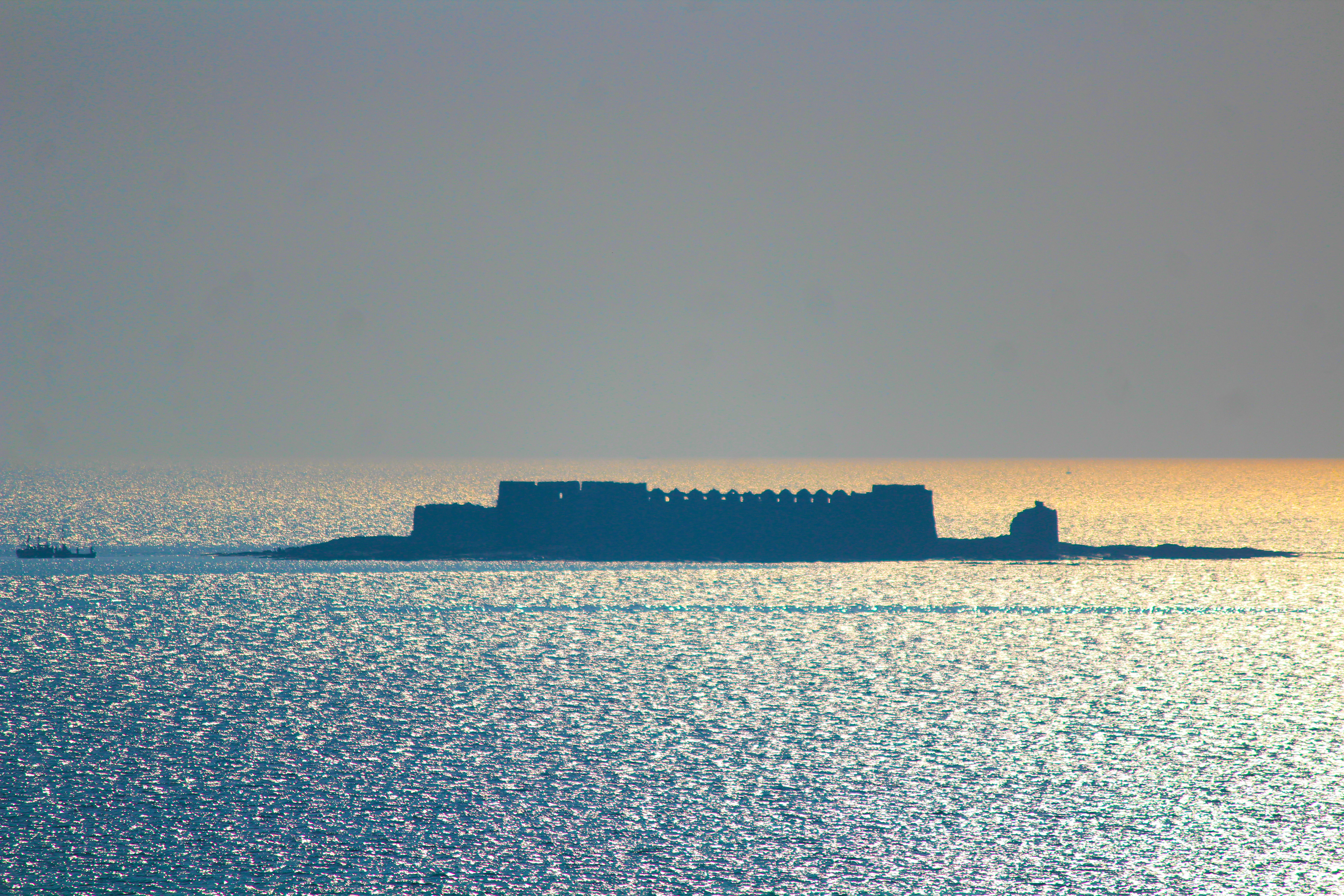

Site information
- Type: Fort
- Owner: Government of India
- Controlled by: Maratha Empire (16th century–18th century); India(19th century–1947); India (1947–present)
- Open to the public: Yes
- Condition: Ruins

Location
- Location within India
- Coordinates: 18°19′19.71″N 72°55′57.53″E

Site history
- Built: 1676
- Built by: Chhatrapati Shivaji Maharaj
- Materials: Sandstone and lime mortar

Padmadurg, also known as Kasa fort, is one of five historical sea forts built by Chhatrapati Shivaji Maharaj and located in Raigad District Maharashtra, India. It was built by Shivaji Maharaj to keep look over Murud-Janjira, as it was attempted many times by the Portuguese and other invaders from Janjira, which was controlled by the Siddis. It also served as a key shipbuilding yard during Shivaji's reign. Now partly in ruins, Padmadurg remains accessible via special permission and is protected under the Archaeological Survey of India, with ongoing efforts to conserve its unique maritime heritage.

== History ==
Padmadurg was one of the sea forts built by Chhatrapati Shivaji Maharaj in 1676 in order to control the naval activities in the Arabian Sea. It is located in the northwest direction of the Janjira fort at a distance of about 4 km. Padmadurg, along with Underi fort, was re-captured by the Marathas (under Raghuji Angre) from the Siddis of Janjira in 1759.

During cleanup activities in 2012, ASI authorities found around 250 cannonballs of historical value. The sea fort of Padmadurg is not as big as Janjira but still the fort can be visited and enjoyed. Visiting the fort requires taking permission from the Customs/Navy. The fort was not only a part of Sindhudurg's defenses but was also Chhatrapati Shivaji Maharaj's main ship construction yard. This fort can also be viewed from Janjira.

== Architecture ==
The Padmadurg Fort was built of sandstone and lime mortar atop a 20 ft deep rock island, the fort spans roughly 9 acres and comprises six rounded bastions. It is structured with three defensive zones: an outer retaining wall, a detached "padkot," and the inner citadel, each designed to withstand waves and enemy assault. Inside, the fort contains dry water tanks, ammunition storage, temple ruins (e.g., Kandeshwari), bunker-like barracks, and numerous cannon placements over 200 cannonballs and 46-47 rusted cannons were discovered during preliminary surveys and the number later went upto 250.
