= Yakut Khan =

First King of Janjira State, India (died 1733)

Qasim Yakut Khan
- First king of Janjira State
- Born: Patil of Guhagar; Guhagar
- Died: 1733
Names
- Qasim Yakut Khan Patil
- Father: Patil of Guhagar
- Religion: Islam
- Occupation: Jagirdar of Janjira State, Admiral of Mughal Navy

Qasim Yakut Khan also known as Yakut Shaikhji, Yakub Khan and Sidi Yaqub was a naval Admiral and administrator of Janjira Fort who first served under Bijapur Sultanate and later under the Mughal Empire.

== Family ==
He was born into a Hindu Koli family which was Patil of Guhagar. He was kidnapped at a young age and later grew up in a Siddi Muslim family. There, he was converted to Islam and got his new name as Qasim Khan and after becoming admiral of the Mughal navy, he was titled Yakut Khan by Mughal Emperor Aurangzeb.

== Biography ==
The Bahmani Sultanate ruler appointed Yaqut Khan as Thanedar or admiral of Danda Rajpuri island. For his services, Yaqut Khan has acquired one-third of the revenues from Surat city. Yaqut Khan were recorded possessing numerous slaves and followers, while also playing important part in politics in Surat. After sometimes with his brother, Khariat Khan, Yaqut then capitalized the fall of Bijapur ruler and led the Siddis to assert control of the impregnable Murud-Janjira island fortress.

At some point, Yaqut Khan were appointed as Nawab of Janjira island state.

In 1600, Yaqut Khan were recorded to occupy the Asirgarh Fort from Farooqui dynasty, during the latter's conflict against Mughal empire. The son of Yaqut Khan, Muqarrab Khan Habshi, who also acted as Mughal commander, accompanying the envoy mission to settle the capitulation of Khandesh region from the Farooqui dynasty.

In October 1672, Khan entered the seven islands of Bombay and attacked the Marathas with whom they were at war. Khan returned the following year, on 10 October 1673, after destroying the towns of Pen and Nagothane. Sidi Yakut, along with Siddi Khariyat Khan, and Siddi Sambal, had earlier saved the Portuguese from the Marathas left by Sambhaji at Chaul. In return, they enjoyed a cordial relationship in the otherwise tense political climate.

In 1689, the Mughal Emperor Aurangzeb ordered Khan to attack Bombay for the third time after Indian vessels sailing to Surat were captured in 1686 (Child's War). In April 1689, the strong Mughal fleet from Janjira commanded by the Sidi Yaqub and crewed by Siddi laid siege to the British fortification to the south. This campaign reached Sewri and Mazagaon with 20,000 soldiers under Sidi Yakut.

After a year of resistance, the English surrendered, and in 1690 the British governor Sir John Child appealed to Aurangzeb. In February 1690, the Mughals agreed to halt the attack in return for 150,000 rupees (over a billion USD at 2008 conversion rates) and Child's dismissal. Child's untimely death in 1690 however, resulted in him escaping the ignominy of being sacked.

Enraged at the agreement, he withdrew his forces on 8 June 1690 after razing the Mazagaon Fort.

Later, the Ganj-i-Sawai and other Mughal vessels, were captured by the pirates Henry Every and Thomas Tew. One of the Maratha forts was captured after he granted amnesty to the garrison. The captured men were killed.

Khan died in 1733.
