= Janjira State =

Princely state of India

Coordinates: 18°18′N 73°00′E

Janjira State जंजीरा रियासत
- Princely State of British India; In union with Jafrabad (1759–1948)
- 1489–1948
- Flag

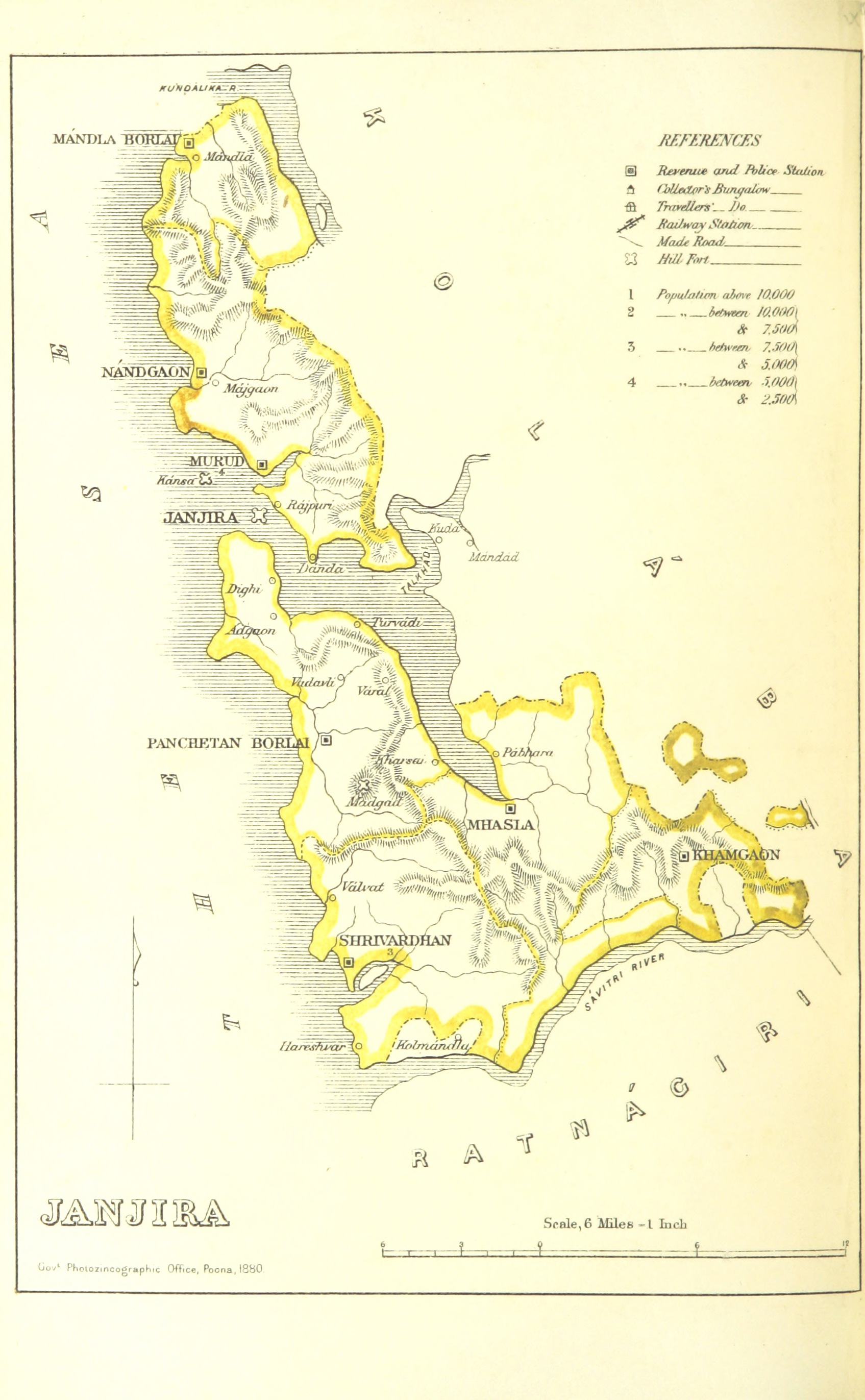
- Janjira State, 1896
- Area
  - 1931: 839 km^{2} (324 sq mi)
- Population
  - 1931: 110,389
- History
  - Established: 1489
  - Indian independence: 1948
Succeeded by
India
- Today part of: Maharashtra, India

Merchant flag

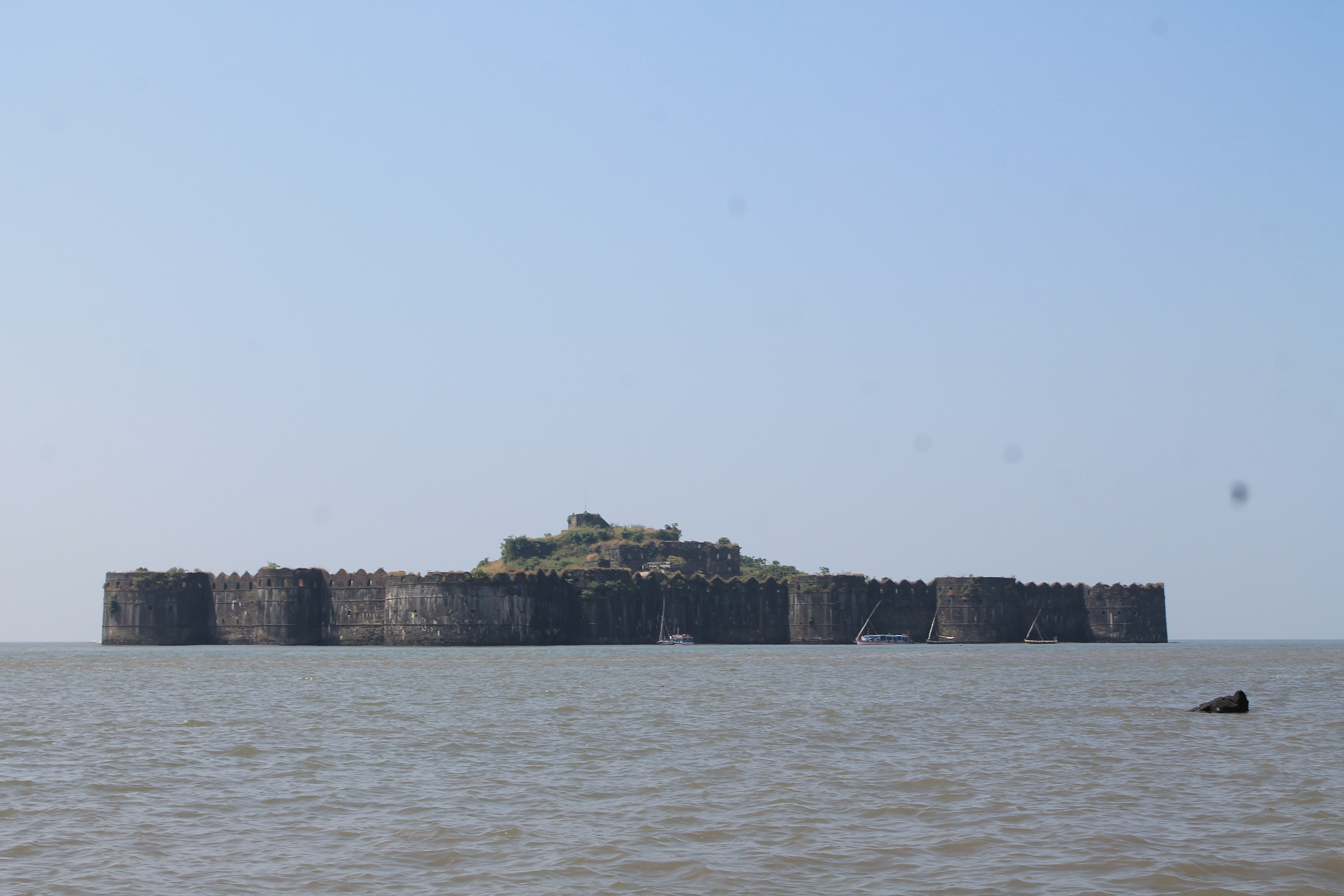
View of Janjira Fort

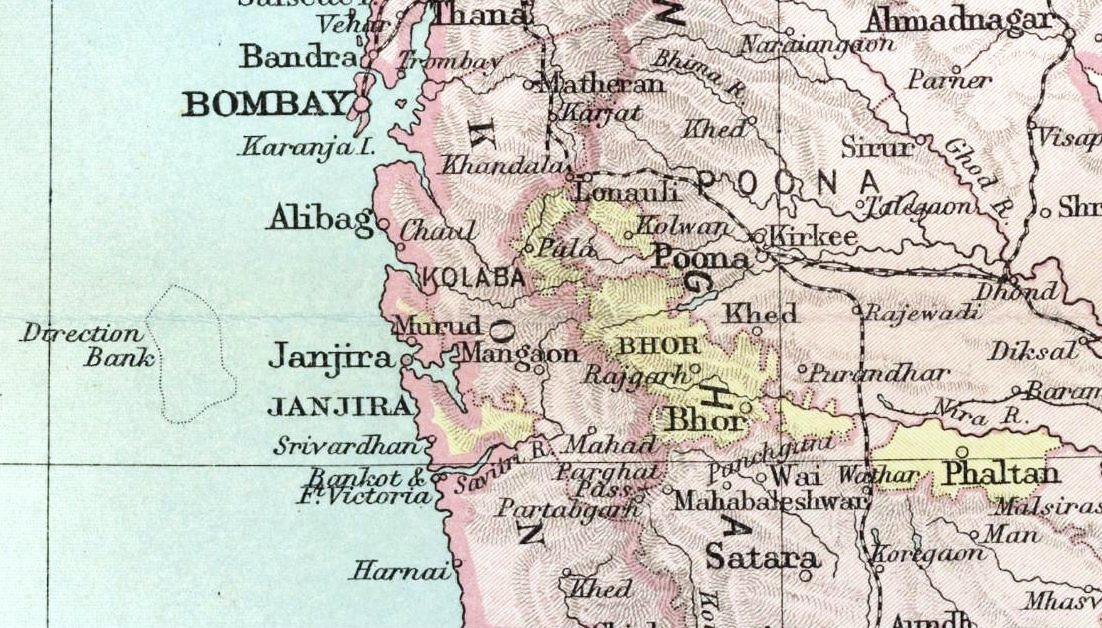
Janjira State in the Imperial Gazetteer of India

Janjira State was a princely state in India during the British Raj. It was governed by the Siddi Khan dynasty of Habesha African descent and the state was under the suzerainty of the Bombay Presidency.

Janjira State was located on the Konkan coast in the present-day Raigad district of Maharashtra. The state included the towns of Murud and Shrivardhan, as well as the fortified island of Murud-Janjira, just off the coastal village of Murud, which was the capital and the residence of the rulers. The state had an area of 839 km^{2}, not counting Jafarabad, and a population of 110,389 inhabitants in 1931. Jafarabad State (also spelled Jafrabad) was a dependency of the Nawab of Janjira State, and located 320 km to its north-northwest.

== History ==
=== Establishment ===
According to legend, Janjira was invaded in 1489 when the Ahmadnagar Sultanate sent its admiral Piram Khan (of Ethiopian descent) with orders to capture the Murud-Janjira from Ram Patil. Owing to the castle's fortifications, Khan could not attack conventionally.

He and his team disguised themselves as merchants and asked Ram Patil to safeguard their three hundred large boxes containing silks and wines from Surat. As thanks, Piram Khan threw a party with wine. Once Ram Patil and his soldiers were intoxicated, Piram Khan opened the boxes, which contained his soldiers, and used the opportunity to capture the castle and the island on which it stands.

In the century that followed the rulers put themselves under the overlordship of the Sultanate of Bijapur. During the seventeenth and eighteenth century Janjira successfully resisted the repeated attacks of the Maratha Empire.

=== Cooperation with the Ottomans ===
According to Ottoman records, a combined force from the Ottomans and Janjira mariners routed a Portuguese fleet in 1587 at Yemen. From this moment onwards Janjira played an important role in resisting Portuguese influence in the region.

There's further record of Cooperation with the Ottoman Empire when the Ottoman fleet first arrived in Aceh prior to Ottoman expedition to Aceh has included 200 Malabar sailors from Janjira State to aid the region Batak and the Maritime Southeast Asia in 1539.

=== Cooperation with the Mughals ===
According to one record, the Mughal emperor Aurangzeb supplied the Siddis of Janjira state with 2,000 men, provisions and ammunition along with two frigates and two large men-of-war. The ship arrived at Bombay harbor under the commands of Siddi Kasim and Siddi Sambal in 1677. The largest Mughal ship named Ganj-I-Sawai (Trading Ship) which was equipped with 800 guns and 400 musketeer type soldiers also stationed in the port of Surat.

Another record from an East India Company factory written 1673 reported the Siddi fleet which wintered from Bombay had five frigates, two men-of-war, and fifteen Grab (ship)grabs. It was because the formidable naval warfare skills of the Siddis in Janjira that Aurangzeb was granting an annual payment of 400.000 Rupees for the maintenance of their fleet.

=== Relations with the Marathas ===
==== Rivalry with the Marathas ====
The main competitor of the Sidis was the Angrias, a Maratha family with sea forts and ships, based in southern Konkan.

==== Treaty with Marathas ====
In 1733, Peshwa Bajirao of the Maratha Empire launched a campaign against the Siddis of Janjira. Bajirao's forces, however, did not take Janjira fort, though they captured much of the surrounding area; a favorable treaty gave the Marathas some indirect control over virtually all of the Siddi's lands. According to the treaty, the Peshwa acknowledged Abdul Rehman as the 'legitimate ruler' of Janjira, bringing an end to all opposition to his succession by his rivals. The territorial holdings of the Siddi were restricted to Anjanwel and Gowalkot, along with the island of Janjira. All other territories on the mainland, previously liberated by the Marathas from Siddi control, including Raigarh, Rewas, Thal, Chaul, etc., were recognized by Abdul Rehman as integral parts of the Maratha state and off-limits to the Siddis.

=== Post Maratha-rule ===
When the British came to the Konkan area, the repeated attacks of the Marathas against Janjira ceased. Janjira State came under British suzerainty in 1870, and was later administered as part of the Deccan States Agency of the Bombay Presidency, founded in 1799. In the nineteenth century the rulers maintained a military force of 123 men.

Following the independence of India in 1947, the state was merged with India.

== Rulers ==
The royal family of Janjira were Siddis, also known as 'Habshi', assumed to be from Abyssinia. Initially the rulers of the state held the title of 'wazir', but after 1803 the title of 'nawab' was officially recognized by the British Raj. They were entitled to an 11 gun salute by the British authorities after the 1903 Coronation Durbar.

== List of rulers ==
=== Wazirs of Janjira ===
- Siddi Fattekhan
- 1676 - 1703 Kasim Yakut Khan II (d. 1703)
- 1703 - 1707 Amabat Yaqut Khan II
- 1707 - 1732 Surur Yakut Khan II (d. 1732)
- 1732 - 1734 Hasan Khan (1st time) (d. 1746)
- 1734 - 1737 Sumbul Khan
- 1737 - 1740 `Abd al-Rahman Khan
- 1740 - 1745 Hasan Khan (2nd time) (s.a.)
- 1745 - 1757 Ibrahim Khan I (1st time) (d. 1761)
- 1757 Mohammad Khan I (d. 1757)
- 1757 - 1759 Ibrahim Khan I (2nd time) (s.a.)

=== Thanadars of Jafarabad and Wazirs of Janjira ===
- 1759 - 1761 Ibrahim Khan I (s.a.)
- 1761 - 1772 Yaqut Khan (usurper to 6 Jun 1772) (d. 1772)
- 1772 - 1784 `Abd al-Rahim Khan (d. 1784)
- 1784 - 1789 Jauhar Khan (d. 1789)
  - - in dispute with -
    - 1784 - 1789 `Abd al-Karim Yaqut Khan
- 1789 - 1794 Ibrahim Khan II (d. 1826)
- 1794 - 1803 Jumrud Khan (d. 1803)

=== Nawabs ===
- 1803 - 1826 Ibrahim Khan II (s.a.)
- 1826 - 31 Aug 1848 Mohammad Khan I (d. 1848)
- 31 Aug 1848 – 28 Jan 1879 Ibrahim Khan III (b. 1825 - d. 1879)
- 28 Jan 1879 - 2 May 1922 Ahmad Khan (b. 1862 - d. 1922) (from 1 Jan 1895, Sir Ahmad Khan)
- 28 Jun 1879 – 11 Oct 1883 .... -Regent
- 2 May 1922 – 15 Aug 1947 Mohammad Khan II (b. 1914 - d. 1972)
- 2 May 1922 - 9 Nov 1933 Kulsum Begum (f) -Regent (b. 1897 - d. 1959)

== See also ==
- Jafarabad State
- Murud-Janjira
- Sachin State
- Gowalkot and Anjanvel
- Political integration of India
- Deccan States Agency
