= Hambirrao Mohite =

Maratha commander (1630–1687)

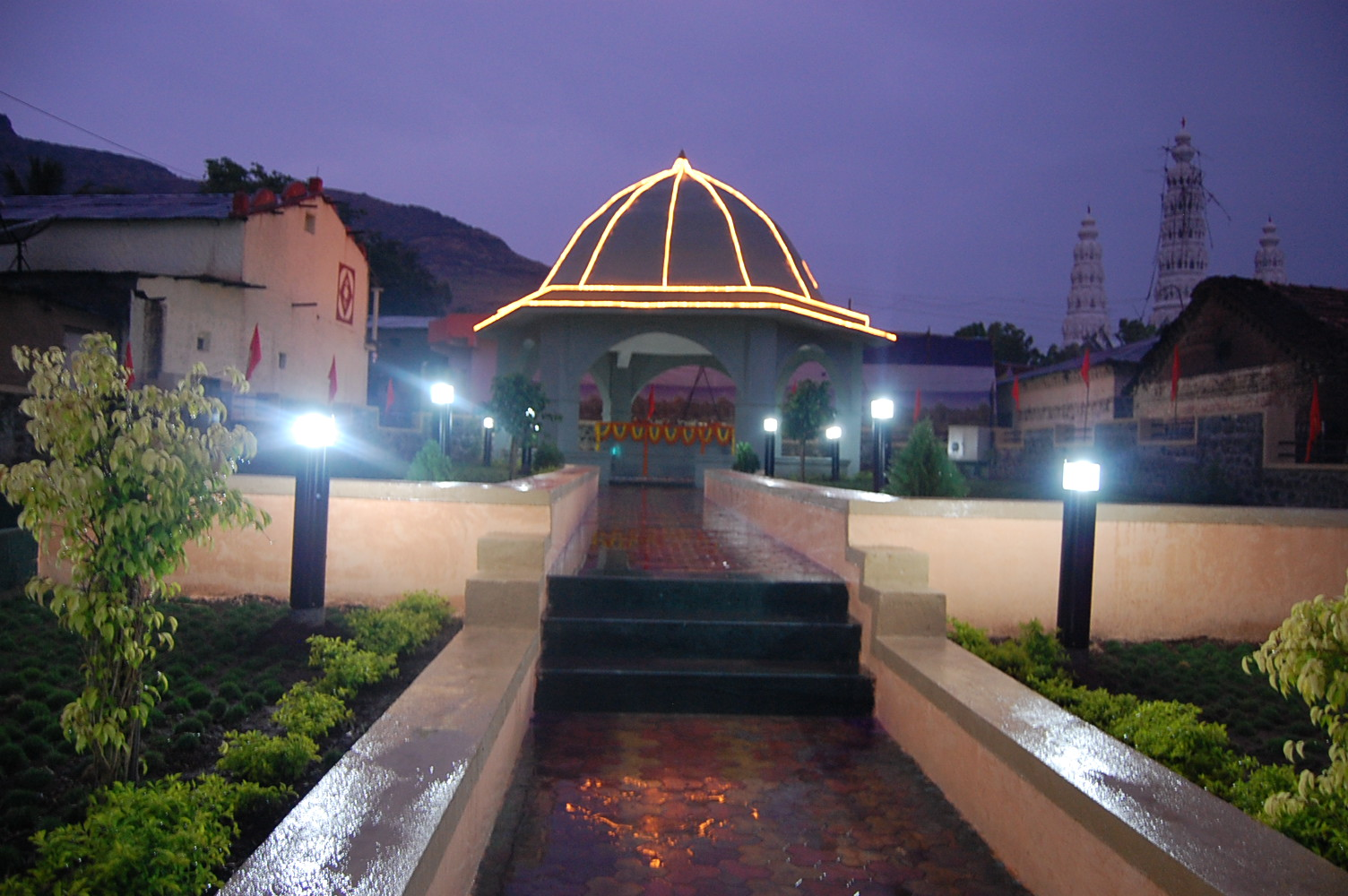
- Samadhi of Senapati Hammbirrao Mohite

5th Senapati of the Maratha Empire
- In office 1674–1687
- Monarchs: Shivaji Maharaj; Sambhaji Maharaj
- Preceded by: Anandrao
- Succeeded by: Maloji Ghorpade

Personal details
- Born: 1630 Talbid, Satara, Ahmadnagar Sultanate (present-day Maharashtra, India)
- Died: December 1687 (aged 56–57) Wai, Maratha Empire
- Children: Tarabai
- Parent: Sambhaji Mohite
- Occupation: General

Military service
- Allegiance: Maratha Empire
- Branch/service: Maratha Army
- Years of service: 1674–1687
- Battles/wars: Mughal-Maratha Wars: Burhanpur (1681); Konkan (1683–84); Kalyan (1683–84); Wai (1687) †

Hansaji Mohite (1630 – December 1687), popularly known as Hambir Rao Mohite, was a prominent Maratha general who held the esteemed position of the 5th Senapati of the Maratha Army during the reign of Chhatrapati Shivaji Maharaj. He was recognized for his exceptional military prowess and successfully led various campaigns on behalf of Chhatrapati Shivaji Maharaj, subsequently continuing his service under Chhatrapati Sambhaji Maharaj.

Hambirrao's true name was Hansaji, and the title Hambir Rao was bestowed upon him by Chhatrapati Shivaji Maharaj in 1674. His descendants continued the title of Hambir Rao.

== Early life ==
Hambirrao was born into the house of Mohites of Talbid. Talbid was a hereditary Jagir of the Mohite clan.

== Accession of Sambhaji ==
After the demise of Chhatrapati Shivaji in 1680, Soyarabai, who was Hambirrao's sister, attempted to displace Sambhaji from the throne in favor of her own 10-year-old son, Rajaram. Hambirrao was temporarily absent from Raigad Fort, and he was urgently called back. Upon his return, his sister earnestly implored him to secure the army's backing for her son as the future Chhatrapati of the Maratha Empire. Hambirrao traveled to Panhala Fort with the initial intent of apprehending Sambhaji but ultimately switched his allegiance, offering support to Shivaji's elder son over his own sister. This action played a pivotal role in securing Sambhaji's ascension on throne and thwarting the conspiracy devised by Soyarabai.

== Military career ==
On January 30, 1681, Burhanpur, a prominent trade center connecting southern and northern India, witnessed a sudden attack by Hambirrao Mohite and Chhatrapati Sambhaji. During this time, Jehan Khan served as the Subahdar of Burhanpur, and the city's garrison comprised only 200 soldiers. In contrast, Hambirrao commanded a formidable army of 20,000 troops. The Mughals found themselves unable to effectively resist Hambirrao's forces, resulting in substantial losses for them. In this battle, the Marathas seized assets exceeding a value of 1 crore rupees.

Later on 17 March 1683, Hambirrao emerged victorious in Battle of Kalyan Bhivandi against Ranamast Khan, a formidable chieftain in the service of Aurangzeb, near the vicinity of Kalyan-Bhiwandi.

=== Final battle and death ===
In the year 1687, during a significant battle that transpired in the vicinity of Wai province, Hambirrao defeated the Mughal commander, Sarja Khan. After the clash a cannonball struck Hambirrao, ultimately resulting in his death.

== In popular culture ==
The film Sarsenapati Hambirrao is based on his life story.

Senapati Hambirrao was played by Ashutosh Rana, in the historical drama Chhaava in 2025.
