= Siege of Ramsej =

Part of the Maratha-Mughal Wars (1682–1688)

Sieges of Ramsej
- Part of Mughal-Maratha Wars, Battles involving the Maratha Empire
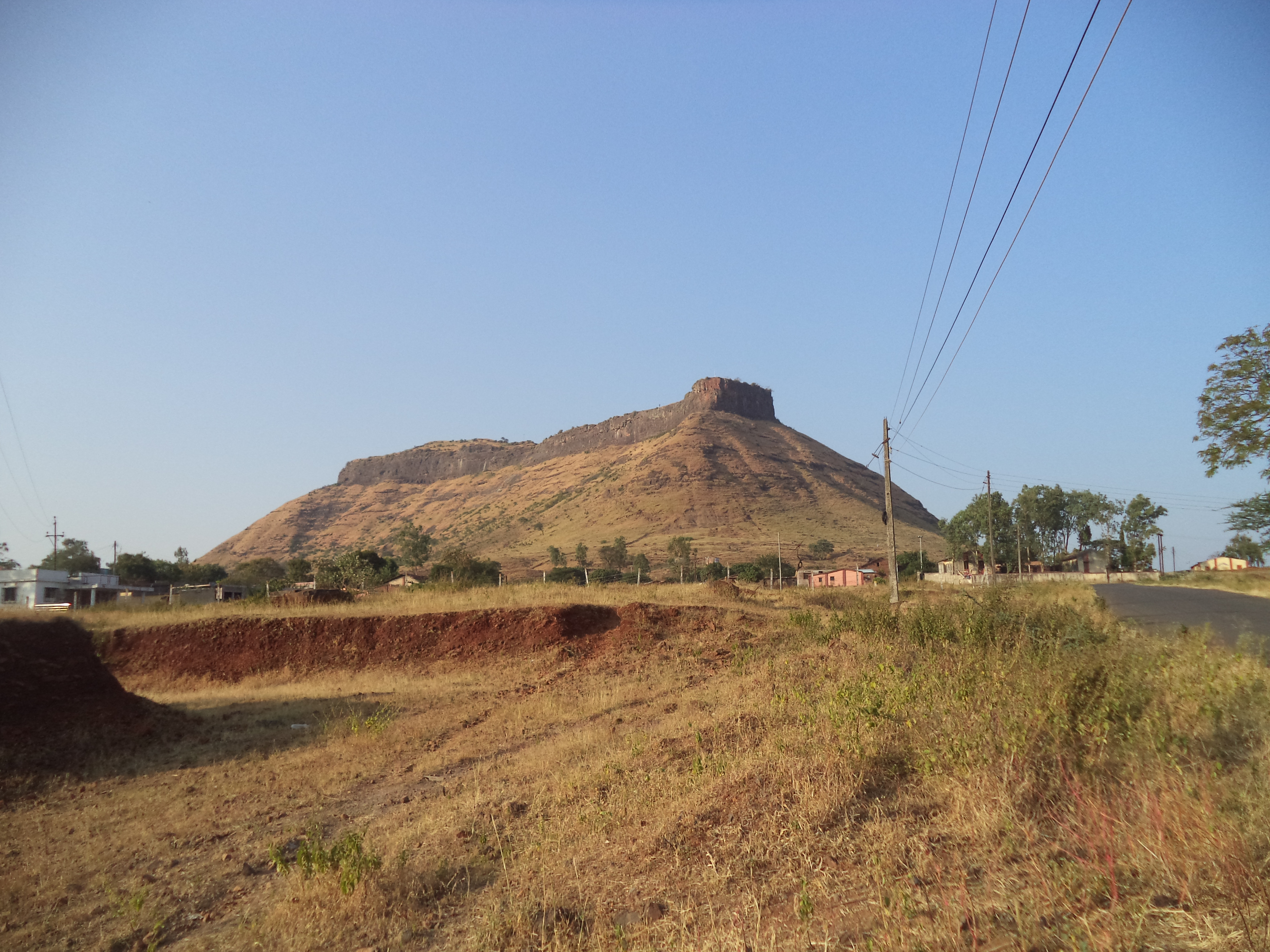
- Ramsej fort
Date	April 1682–1688
Location	Ramsej, Nashik district, Maharashtra 20.112195°N 73.767354°E
Result	Mughal victory
Territorial changes	Ramsej Fort is captured by the Mughals.

Belligerents
Maratha Kingdom	Mughal Empire

Commanders and leaders
Suryaji Jedhe; Manaji More (surrendered); Rupaji Bhosale (WIA) (surrendered)	Shahabuddin Khan; Bahadur Khan Kokaltash; Kasim Khan Kirmani

Strength
In the First attack 600; At Ganeshgaon; 600 with 8,000 reinforcements under Rupaji Bhosale and Manaji More; In the final attack Roughly 600	In the First attack 40,000; At Ganeshgaon; Roughly 40,000; In the final attack 36,500

Casualties and losses
550	7000-10000
- Location within Maharashtra Siege of Ramsej (India)

The Sieges of Ramsej (1682 – 1688) were a series of military confrontations between the Maratha Kingdom headed by Sambhaji and the Mughal Empire led by Aurangzeb regarding the control of Ramsej Fort in the Nashik region. Aurangzeb arrived in the Deccan in late 1681 with a strong army to destroy the Maratha Kingdom and the Deccan Sultanates of Bijapur and Golconda. He wanted to capture the forts held by the Marathas in the Nashik and Baglana regions. Hence he decided to begin his Deccan campaign with an attack on Ramsej Fort which is near Nashik. The Mughal forces under Kasim Khan Kirmani captured Ramsej from the Marathas. The defending Maratha forces evacuated the fort.

== Before the siege ==
Shivaji's general Peshwa Moropant Pingle had captured Ramsej in the year 1671–72. Since then, it had been a part of the Maratha Kingdom. Ramsej was a fort lying in open lands without excessive forest cover. So, Aurangzeb decided that it would be a good idea to capture an easy fort like Ramsej right at the beginning to increase the morale of his troops. Ramsej Fort saw the war against the Mughal Empire for six and a half years. The first killedar (fort commander) was Suryaji Jedhe, but after six and a half years, he was transferred and a new killedar was appointed as per the rotation of posts policy of the Maratha Kingdom. In April of 1682, Aurangzeb sent Shahabuddin Khan who attacked the fort with an army of 40,000.

== First attack on Ramsej ==
First Siege of Ramsej
Date	1682-1683
Location	Ramsej, Nashik district, Maharashtra
Result	Maratha victory

Belligerents
Maratha Empire	Mughal Empire

Commanders and leaders
Suryaji Jedhe	Shahabuddin Khan

Strength
600	40,000

Casualties and losses
Minimum	Heavy

Shahbuddin Khan had vowed to capture the fort with his 40,000 army and strong artillery within a few hours. The Marathas did not succumb to this onslaught. The 600 Maratha soldiers on the fort kept his forces at bay for many months by fierce array of slingshots, lit haystack and huge stones even though they did not have cannons on the fort. Once the Mughal artillery managed to break the fort walls in the evening and they assumed that the fort will be captured easily. But all 600 Marathas on the fort worked for a full night and rebuilt the entire broken section of the wall, much to the despair and awe of the Mughals. Such fierce resistance made the Mughal soldiers believed that the Marathas on the fort knew black magic. The inability of the Mughal Sardar to capture the fort started frustrating Aurangzeb. He raised a wooden platform to storm the fort. Shivaji and his son Sambhaji had a policy of keeping enough ammunition even on the forts having no cannons or guns. Ramshej was no exception and even though it did not have cannons it had sufficient ammunition. The fort commander had an idea and utilised amply available animal skin and wood on the fort to make wooden cannons. Coupled with the ammunition already present on the fort, these wooden cannons started inflicting heavy losses on the Mughal Army.

== The second attack on Ramsej ==
Battle of Ganeshgoan
Date	1683
Location	Ramsej, Maharashtra
Result	Maratha victory: Bahadur Khan Kokaltash flees the battle after being ambushed

Belligerents
Maratha Kingdom	Mughal Empire

Commanders and leaders
Rupaji Bhosale (WIA); Manaji More	Bahadur Khan Kokaltash

Strength
600; 8,000 reinforcements under Rupaji Bhosale and Manaji More	close to 40,000

Casualties and losses
Unknown	700 soldiers killed •500 horsemen killed

The retaliation from the Marathas was so strong that he left the responsibility to Bahadur Khan Kokaltash and went to Junnar. Bahadur Khan Kokaltash also tried to capture the fort by fooling Marathas into believing that the Mughals were preparing for a full-fledged frontal assault, while his real plan was to send 200 of his best troops from the rear side of the fort by climbing the steep cliff. The Maratha commander was aware of the plan and allowed these 200 soldiers to climb the rope. Once they had climbed up the rope, he cut the rope as a result of which 200 of the best Mughal soldiers fell and died in the valley. Bahadur Khan Kokaltash was distraught and found that Marathas were receiving secret supplies from the nearby forts. He carefully blocked all the paths to nearby Maratha forts. There was dire shortage of food on the fort. Seeing this situation, Maratha King Sambhaji acted quickly by sending his sardars Rupaji Bhosale and Manaji More with an 8,000 strong army and supplies. The two forces clashed at Ganeshgaon. They tried to break through the Mughal line but were unable to supply the fort. Rupaji Bhosale was wounded in the battle. Sambhaji was in great worry that his fiercely brave warriors were fighting without food. One day, due to severe bad weather Bahadur Khan Kokaltash relaxed his encirclement for one day enabling Rupaji Bhosale and Manaji More to supply the fort with supplies enough for 6 more months. Bahadur Khan Kokaltash then tried to win the fort with the help of a 'mantrik' as he believed that the Marathas had ghosts under their control. The Marathas again fooled him as the mantrik was himself a Maratha soldier in disguise who led the Mughal Army in a deadly ambush of the Marathas. Bahadur Khan Kokaltash and Mughals fled the deadly ambush and several Mughals were killed in this surprise attack. Bahadur Khan Kokaltash was also unable to siege the fort, finally, he burnt the wooden platform and left the battle.

== Final attack ==
Second Siege of Ramsej (1683-1688)
Date	1683-1688
Location	Ramsej, Maharashtra
Result	Mughal victory
Territorial changes	Ramsej fort is captured by the Mughals

Belligerents
Maratha Empire	Mughal Empire

Commanders and leaders
1683-1686; Rupaji Bhosale; Manaji More; Suryaji Jedhe	1683-1686; Kasim Khan Kirmani
1686-1688; Rupaji Bhosale; Manaji More	1686-1688; Kasim Khan Kirmani

Strength
600	36,500

Casualties and losses
Many Maratha soldiers killed.	Heavy

The frustrated Aurangzeb then sent Kasim Khan Kirmani to lead the battle and Kasim Khan finally decided to lead the 36,500 strong Mughal soldiers right into the fort with an all-out assault. During the battle, the kiledar, Suryaji Jedhe was transferred from the fort per Maratha policy. During the battle, the Mughal soldiers finally stormed Ramsej Fort and killed many Maratha soldiers. However, some of the Marathas escaped capture and death by using a rope which had been set by Rupaji Bhosale from the back of the fort. Thus, many Marathas managed to escape before the Mughals finally took control of the fort. Finally, the Mughals hoisted their imperial flag atop the fort and the fort was finally taken after a long, hard, and tiring 7 years.

== Aftermath ==
Despite the Mughal victory in capturing the fort, it proved to be a strategic failure. Aurangzeb as well as the other commanders, had anticipated the fort falling to Mughal hands in weeks, yet it took ample resources and effort. Shortly after the siege, the Mughals captured Sambhaji in 1689 and most of the Maratha territories would come under Mughal dominion shortly after.

== See also ==
- Sambhaji
- Aurangzeb
- Ramsej
- Battles involving the Maratha Empire
- Mughal–Maratha Wars
