= Mohite (clan) =

Maratha clan

House of Mohite Mohites of Talbid
- Flag of the Maratha Empire
- Parent house: Chahamanas of Ranastambhapura
- Origin: Talbid
- Founded: 17th century
- Founder: Ratoji Mohite
- Titles: Hambirrao; Senapati; Sardar; Jagirdar of Talbid
- Connected families: House of Bhonsle
- Cadet branches: Mohites of Rajewadi, Phaltan

The House of Mohite or Mohite clan is a prominent Maratha clan that held significant positions as Senapati and Sardar within the Maratha Empire. The House of Mohite was established by Sambhaji Mohite, who served as the Subedar of Saswad and was the brother of Shahaji's wife, Tukabai. He was also the father of Soyarabai, who later became the wife of Chhatrapati Shivaji. His son Hambirrao Mohite became the Senapati of the Maratha Empire. The Mohite clan played significant role during the Mughal-Maratha wars.

== History ==
The Mohite name is first documented in "Shivabharat," a Sanskrit poem dating back to the 17th century. During that period, the Mohite clan served different Deccan sultanates, including the Nizamshahi and the Adilshahi of Bijapur, similar to other Maratha clans like Bhosale, Ghorpade, More, Shirke, Thorat, and so on. One of Shahaji's wives, Tukabai, hailed from the Mohite family. Their son, Venkoji, presided over the Maratha kingdom of Tanjore. Tukabai's niece, who was her brother's daughter, Soyarabai, subsequently became the second wife of Chhatrapati Shivaji. The renowned female Maratha warrior, Tarabai, who was the wife of Rajaram I, also belonged to the Mohite clan. With the ascendancy of Shivaji, the Mohite clan earned his trust and emerged as his esteemed generals. Amidst the internal conflicts within the Bhosale family following Shivaji's demise in 1680, Soyarabai's own brother and army chief, Hambirrao Mohite, shifted allegiance to support Sambhaji's claim to the Maratha throne. His descendant, Bhavanji Mohite, held the position of commander at the Maratha naval base in Malvan during the early years of the 18th century.

== Family tree ==
Family tree of Mohites of Maratha Heritage (96 kuli Maratha)

Ratoji Mohite
Tukoji Mohite
Sambhaji Mohite	Tarabai (married Shahaji)
Hambirrao Mohite	Soyrabai (Maharani of Maratha Empire)
Lakshuman Mohite
Gunhaji Mohite
Balkrushna Mohite
Ramchandra Mohite
Suresh Mohite
Vijay Mohite
Chaitanya Mohite

== See also ==
- Hambirrao Mohite
- Soyarabai
- Tarabai
- Vyankoji
