= Battle of Kalyan =

1680s battles in Maharashtra, India

- Part of Deccan wars
Date	1682–1683
Location	Kalyan
Result	Mughal victory
Territorial changes	Kalyan occupied and later abandoned by the Mughals.

Belligerents
Maratha Kingdom	Mughal Empire

Commanders and leaders
Tukoji †; Rupaji Bhonslé; Moropant Trimbak Pingle	Bahadur Khan; Hasan Ali Khan; Ranmast Khan; Padam Singh (POW)

Strength
Unknown	Unknown

Casualties and losses
Heavy	Heavy

The Battle of Kalyan was a series of engagements between the Mughal Empire and the Maratha Kingdom over Kalyan in 1682–83, during the Deccan wars. Mughal forces under Bahadur Khan captured Kalyan on 28 November 1682 after defeating a Maratha force. A major counter-attack led by Rupaji Bhonslé and Moropant Trimbak Pingle in December was repelled, as was another Maratha assault on 27 February 1683.

The Mughals occupied Kalyan for several months, but their forces were recalled in March 1683. Before withdrawing, they razed the fortifications. During the retreat, a Maratha force under Rupaji Bhonslé ambushed the Mughal rear at Titvala, inflicting heavy casualties and capturing the Rajput commander Padam Singh.

== Background ==
In the winter of 1681–82 Sambhaji laid siege on the Siddi stronghold of Janjira throughout January 1682. Meanwhile, Aurangzeb seized the opportunity to open a new front. On 7 November 1681, he ordered Hasan Ali Khan, to lead 14,000 cavalry from Junnar into northern Konkan. The Marathas failed to halt his advance through the Nanaghat pass, allowing Hasan Ali Khan to capture Kalyan around 30 January 1682. During the march, his forces burned numerous Maratha villages and, inadvertently, nine villages under Portuguese control. Hasan Ali Khan withdrew from the province in May.

== Battle ==
In October 1682, as ordered by Aurangzeb, Ranmast Khan crossed Mahajat pass and entered Konkan. On November 28, Mughal General Bahadur Khan captured Kalyan after defeating Maratha forces. Despite a major counter-attack in December by Rupaji Bhonslé and the Peshwa Moropant Trimbak Pingle, the Marathas failed to stop him. Tukoji died in the conflict but the Mughals held their ground. On February 27, 1683, the Mughals decisively repelled another Maratha assault with heavy casualties, maintaining a tight blockade on the fort.

== Aftermath ==
Ranmast Khan’s army occupied Kalyan for several months, sustained by supplies from the Mughal fleet at Surat starting in December 1682. In March 1683, Ruhullah Khan arrived with reinforcements. In March 1683, the Mughal divisions were recalled to the Emperor. On March 23, Ruhullah and Ranmast Khan razed Kalyan’s fortifications and retreated. During the withdrawal, Rupaji Bhonsle’s Maratha army ambushed the Mughal rear at Titvala, inflicting heavy casualties, seizing horses, and capturing the Rajput chief Padam Singh.

== See also ==
- Battle of Wai
- Sacking of Burhanpur (1681)

== Bibliography ==
- Sarkar, Jadunath (1929). History of Aurangzib. Vol. IV (2nd ed.). Calcutta: Orient Longman Ltd.
