= Ramsej Fort =

Fort in Maharashtra, India

Ramshej Fort
- Nashik, Maharashtra, India
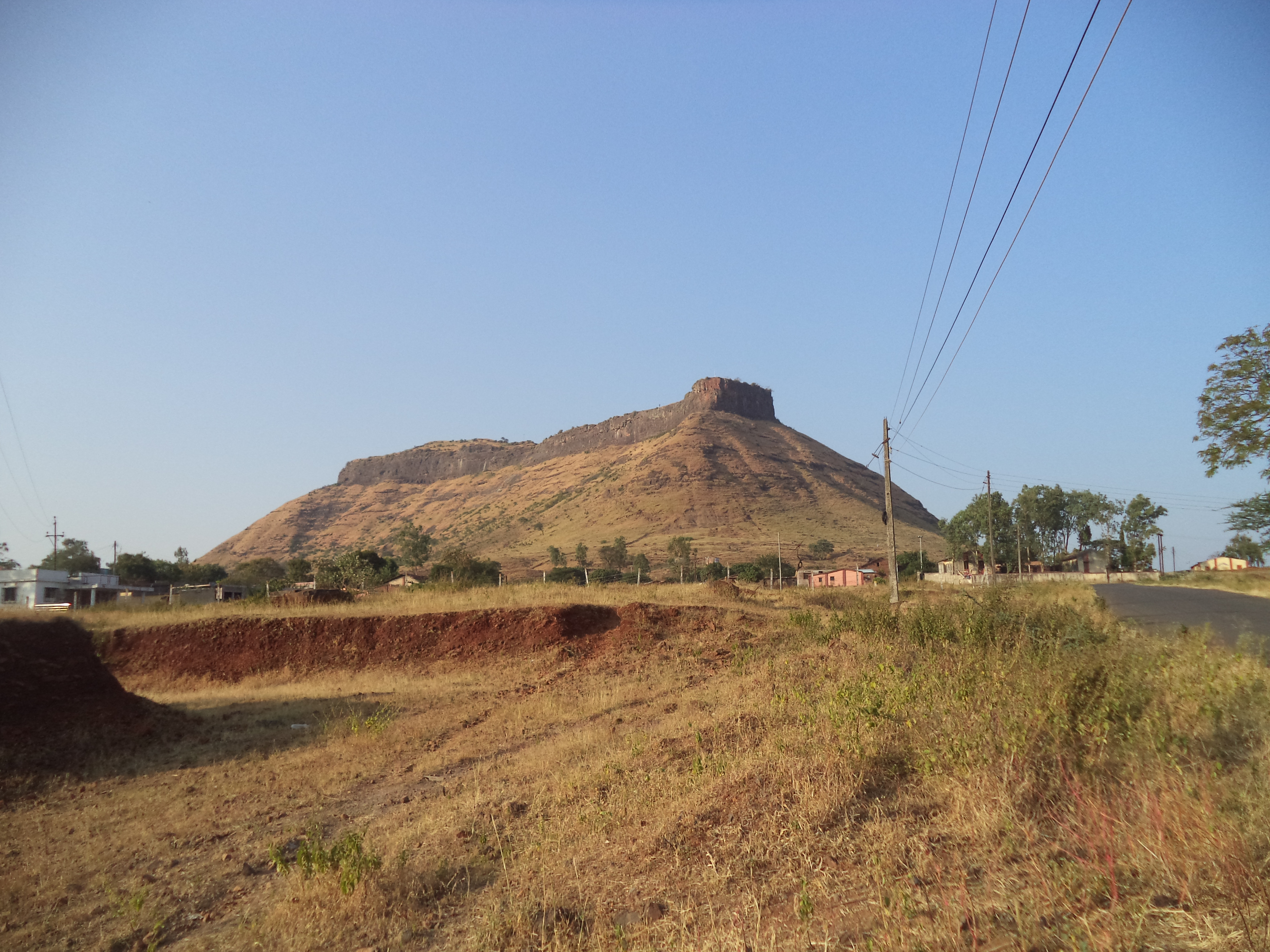
- Ramshej fort from base village

Site information
- Type: Fort
- Owner: Govt. of India
- Open to the public: Yes
- Condition: Ruins

Location
- Ramshej Fort Ramshej Fort (Maharashtra)
- Coordinates: 20.112195°N 73.767354°E
- Height: 3200 feet

Site history
- Materials: Stone

Ramsej or Ramshej Fort is a small fort located 10 kilometres (6.2 mi) north-west of Nashik, in the Indian state of Maharashtra. The fort is located on the Nashik-Vapi route.

In April 1682, Mughal forces under Aurangzeb and led by Shahabuddin Khan attacked the fort at Ramsej which were held by the Marathas. A months-long effort to take control of the fort ended in failure, ending in the retreat of the Mughals.

== Gallery ==
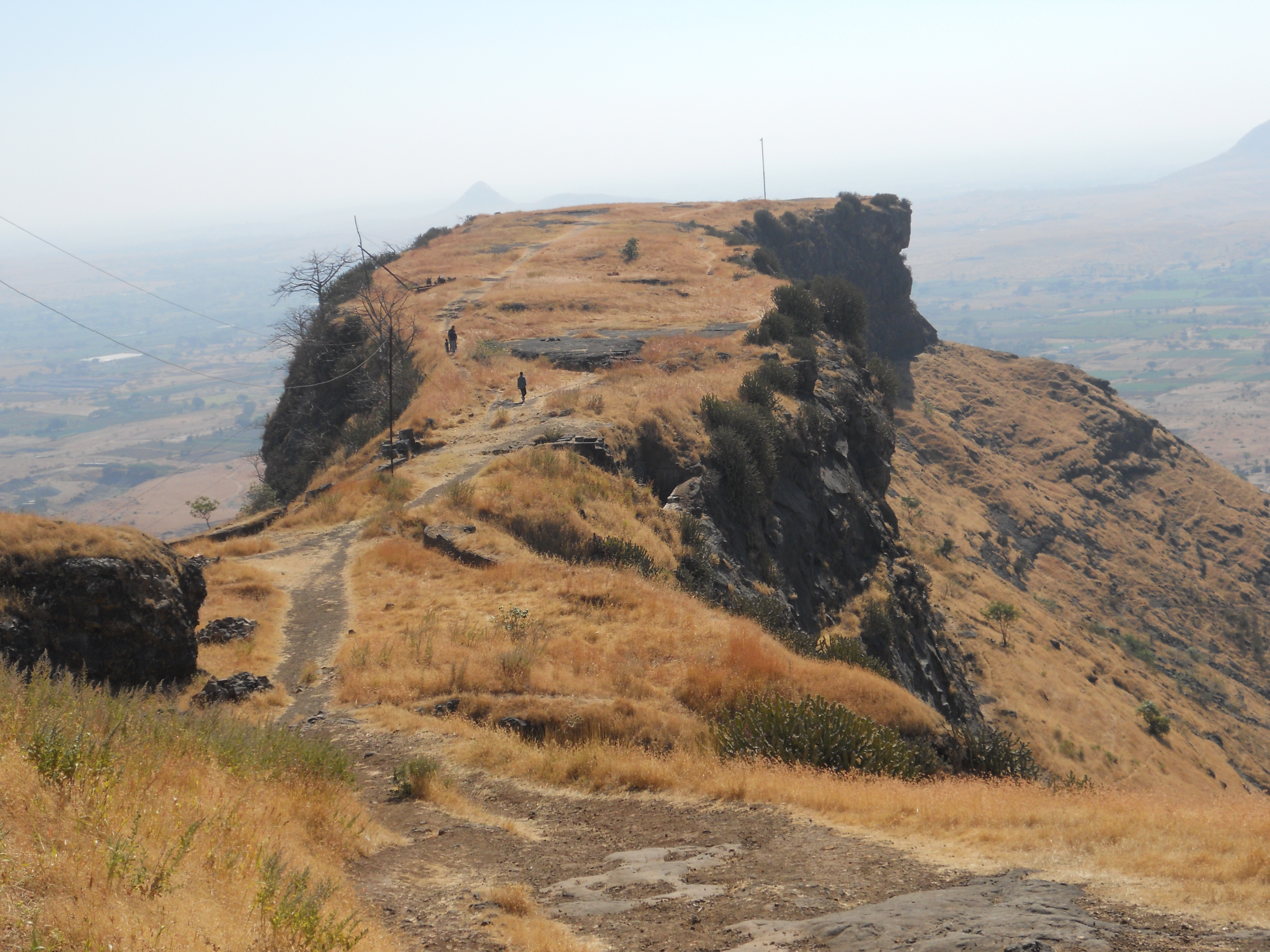
plateau on Fort

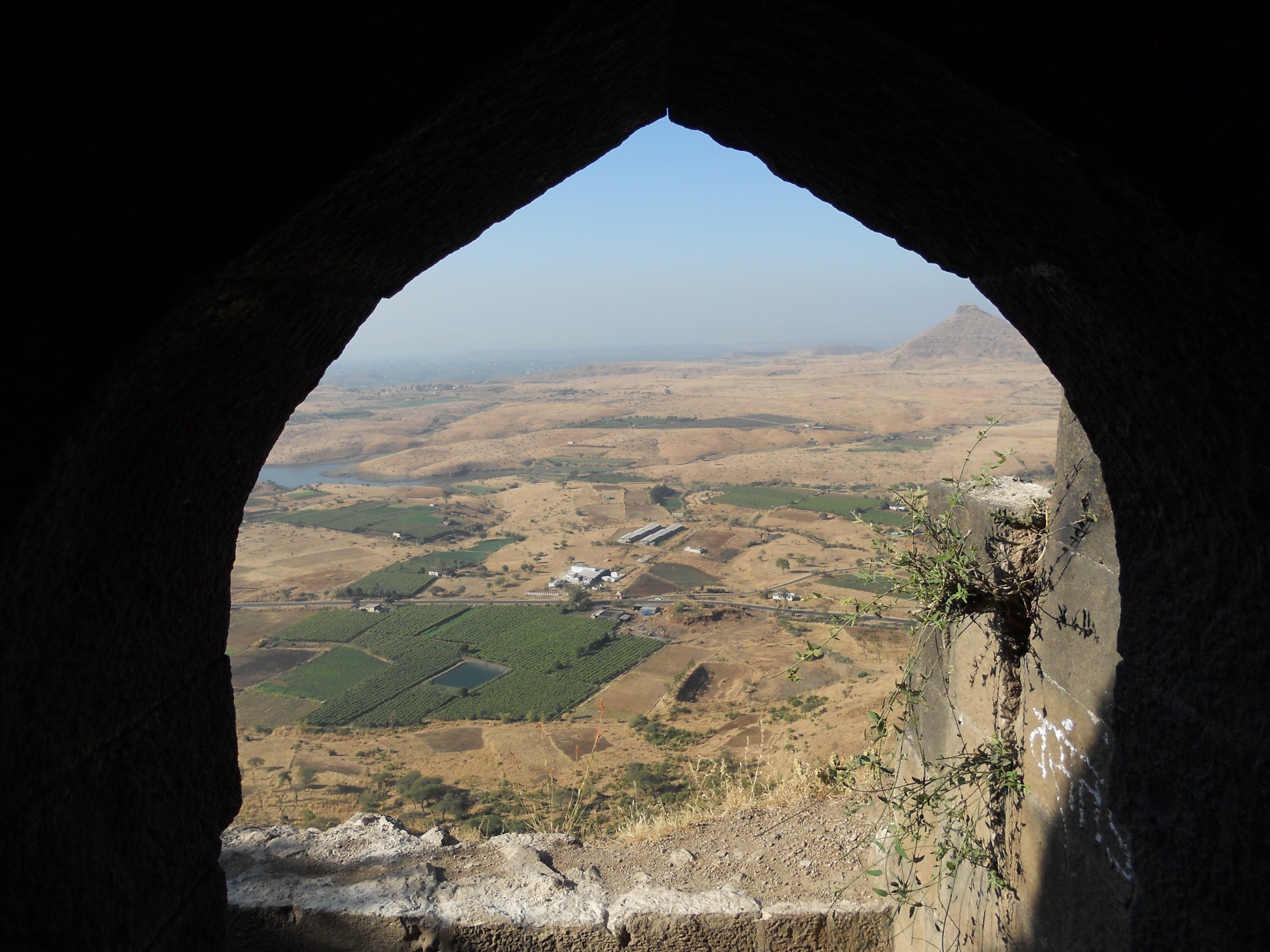
Outside view

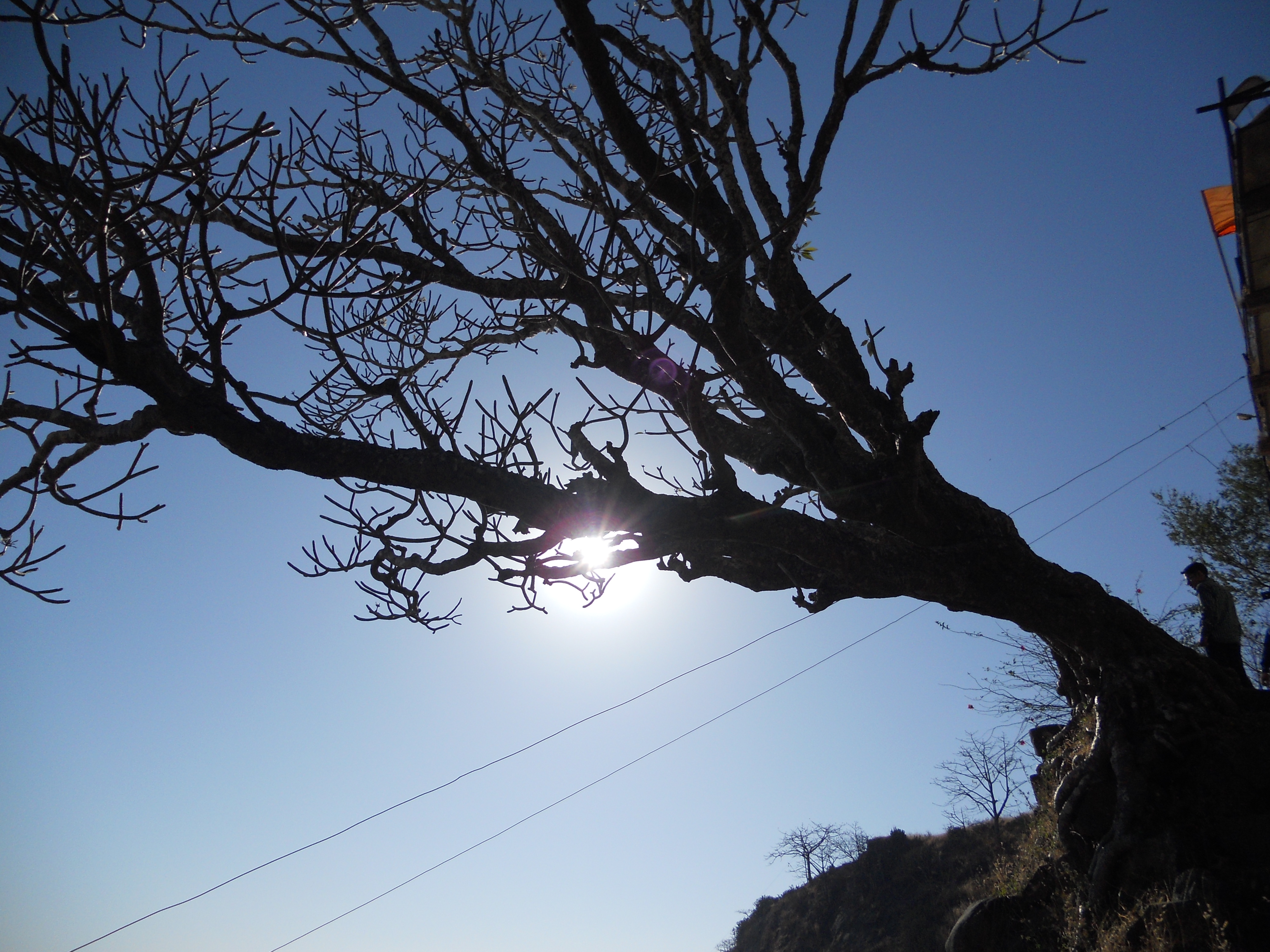
Sunshine on the fort

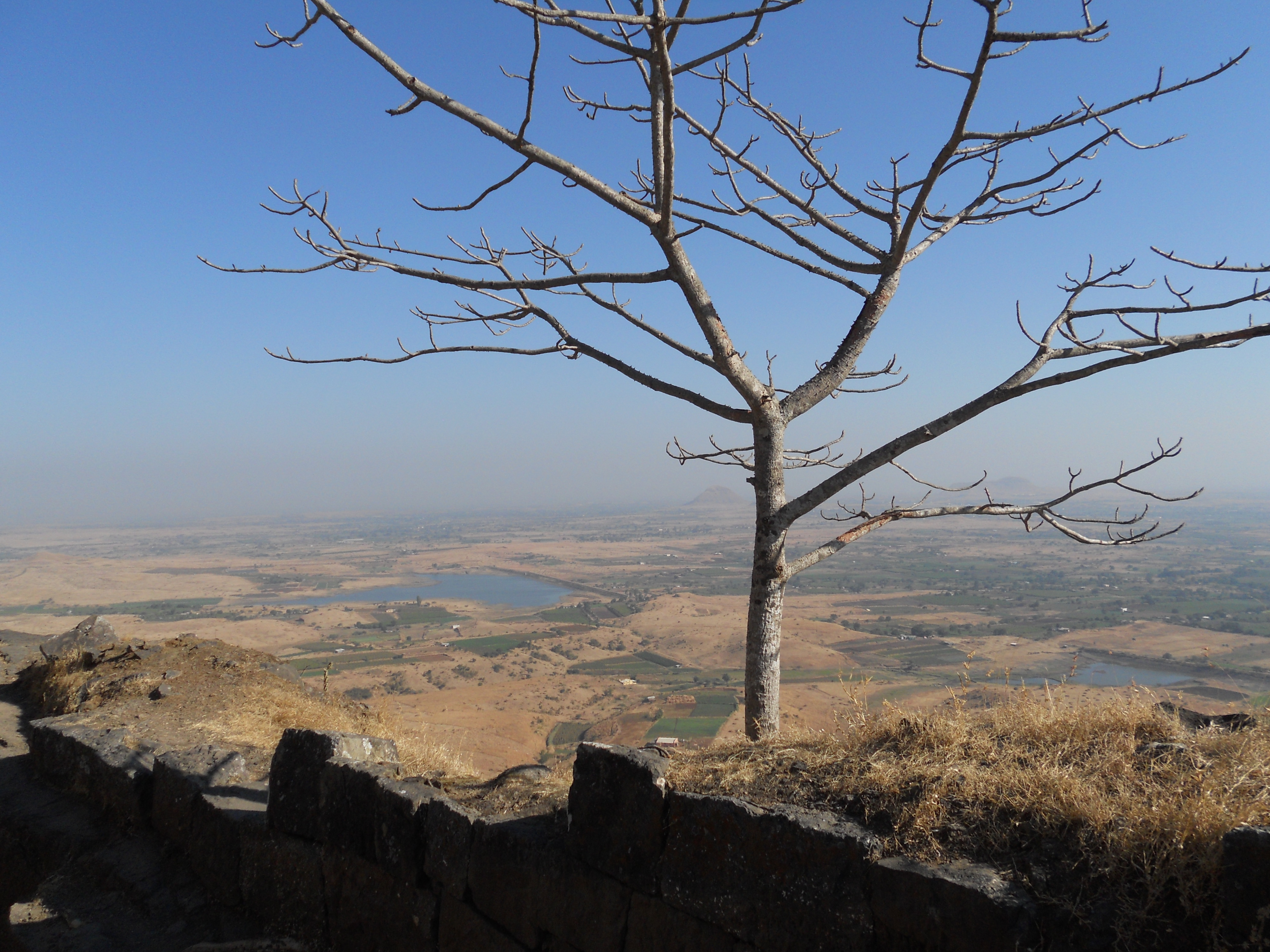
Tree stood alone on the fort

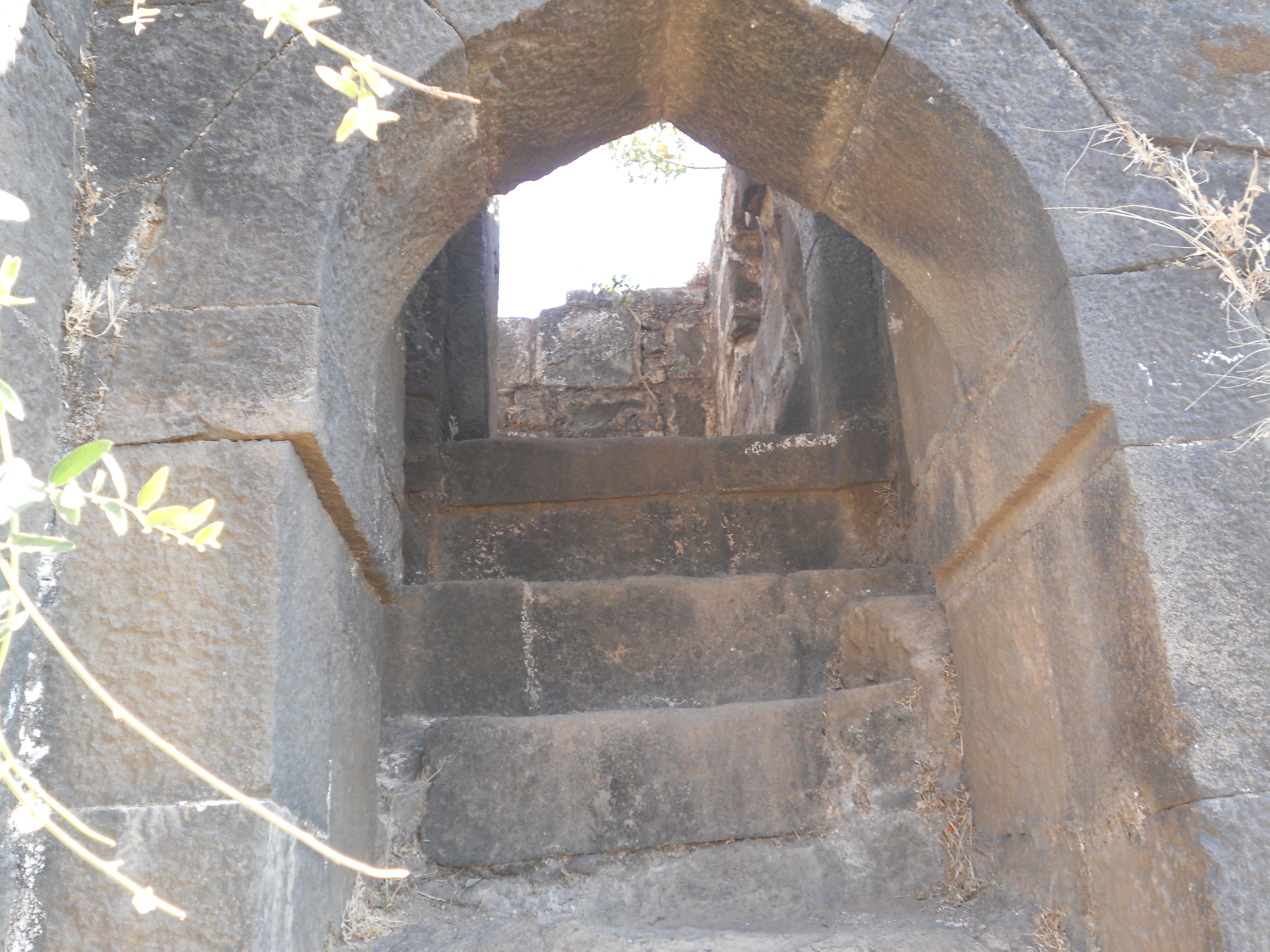
Staircase

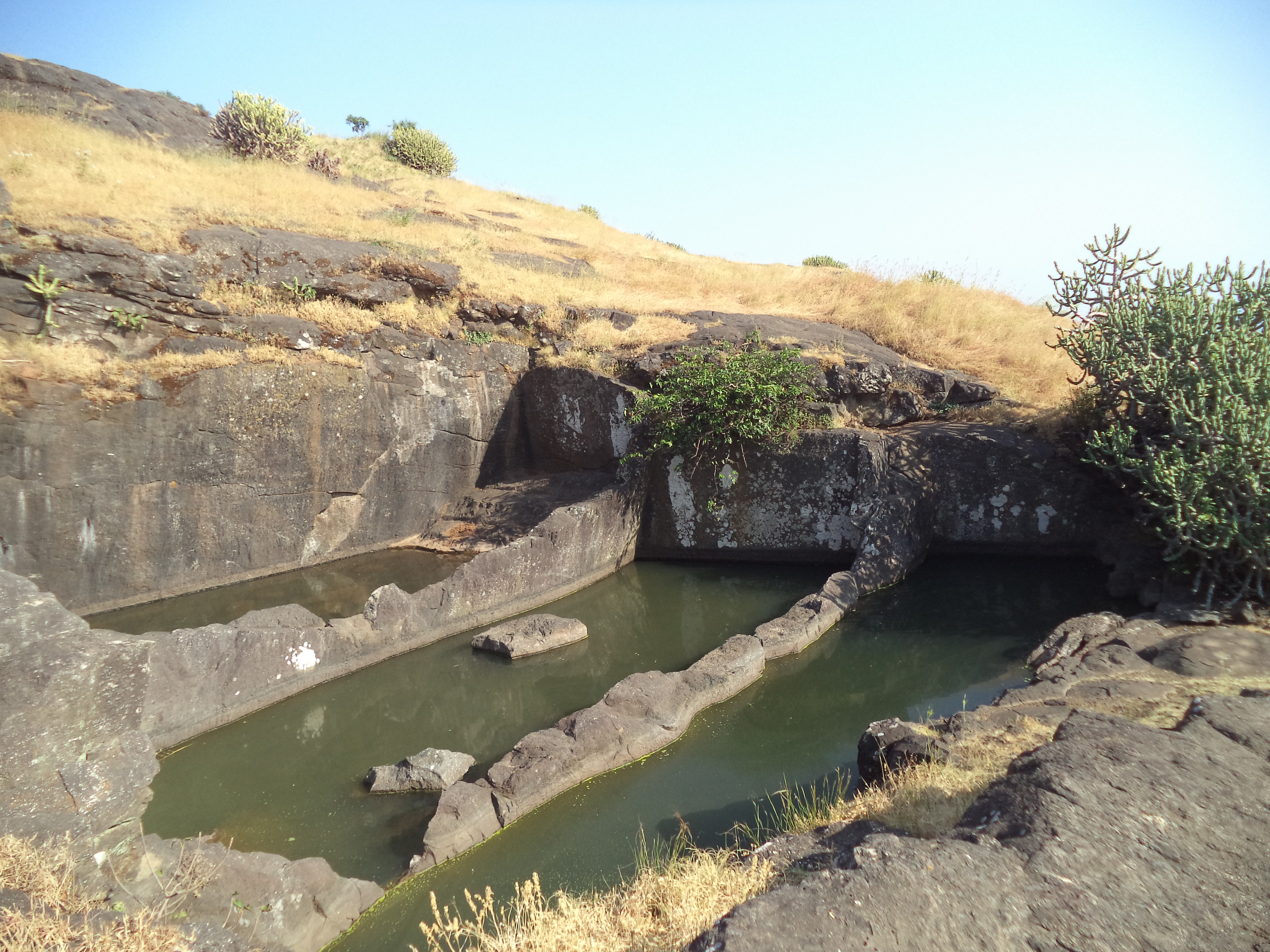
Rockcut water cistern

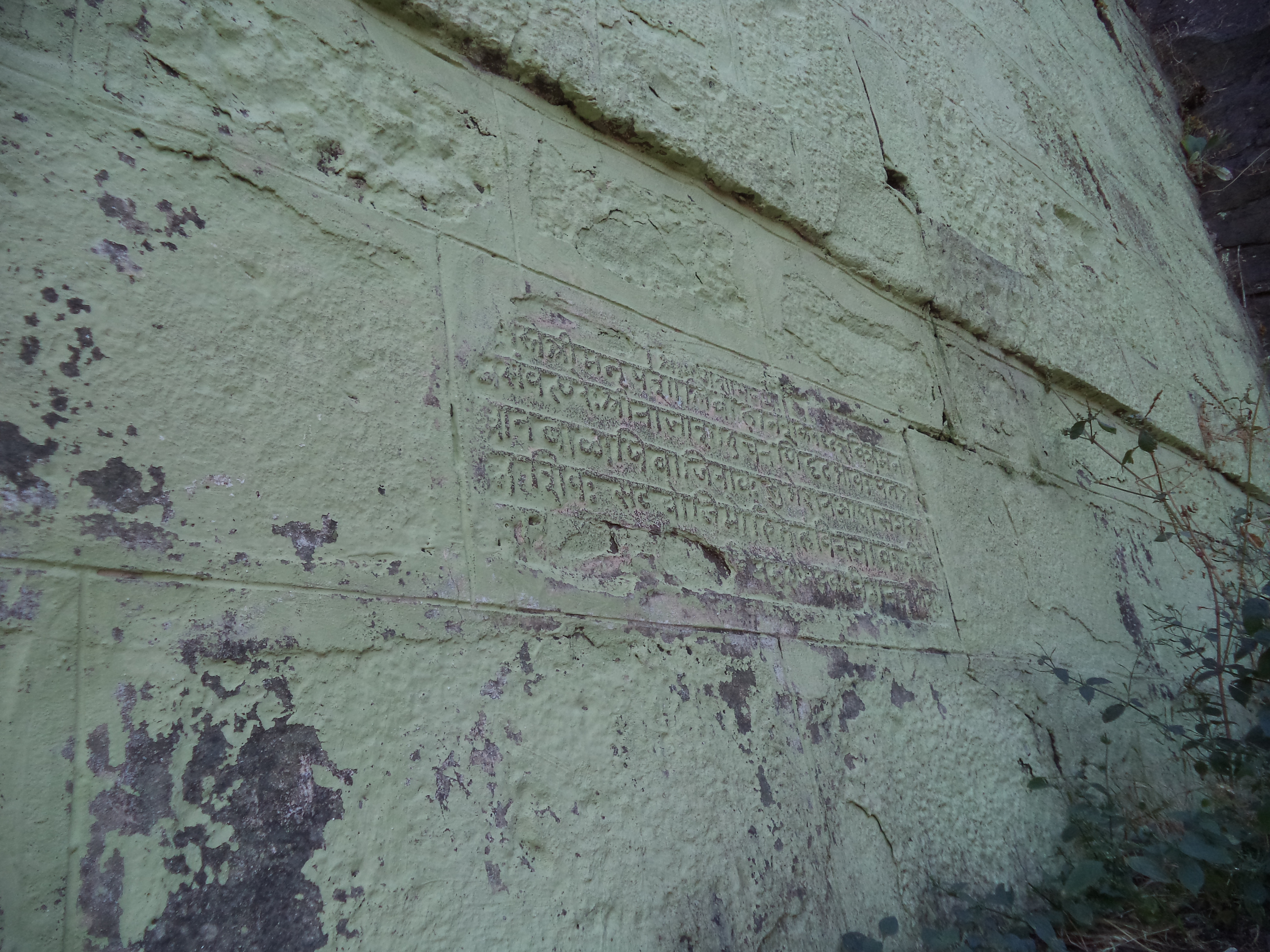
Inscriptions on the temple wall

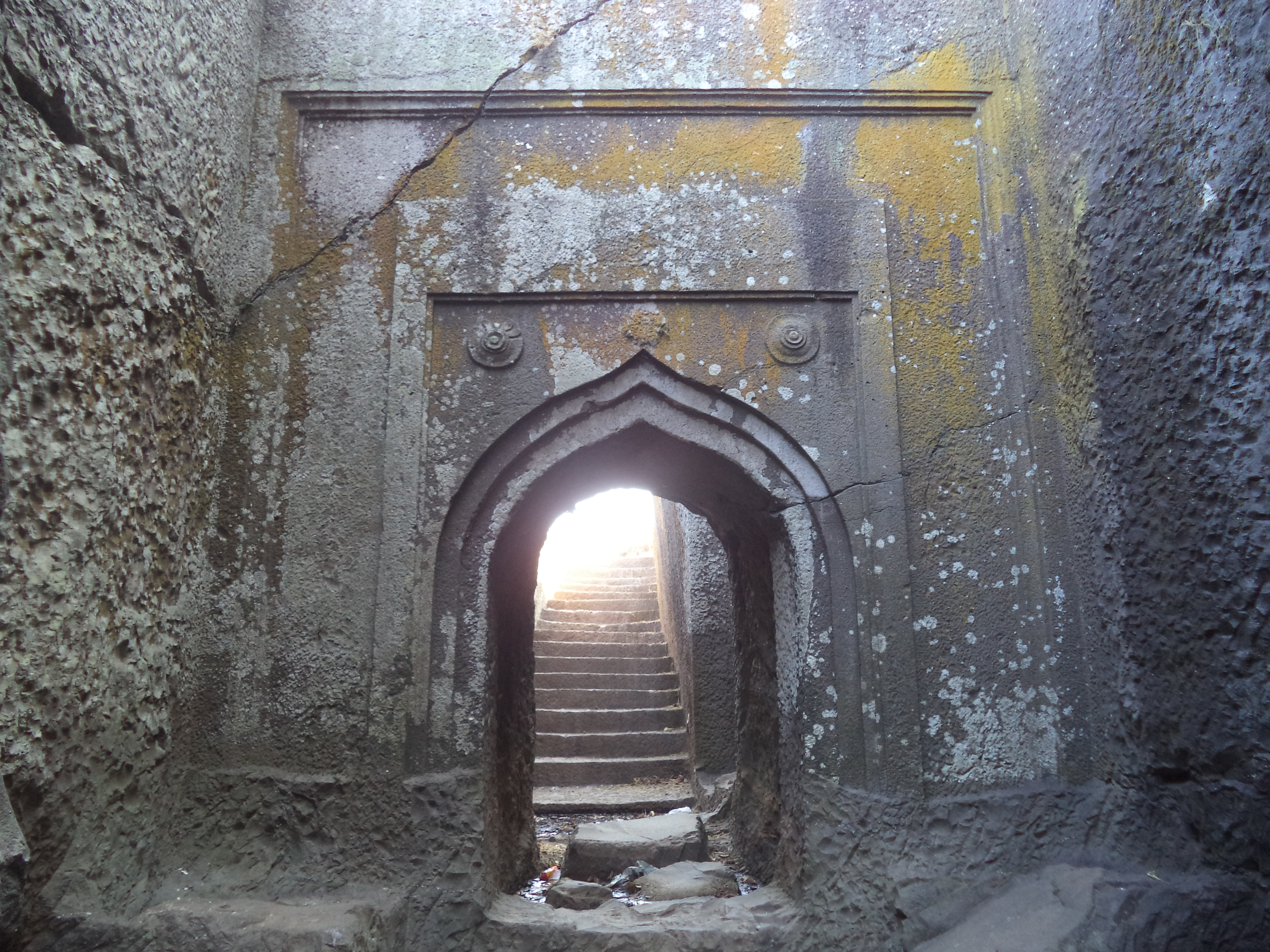
Main entrance gate

== See also ==
- Siege of Ramsej
- List of forts in Maharashtra
- List of forts in India
- Sambhaji
- Maratha War of Independence
- Battles involving the Maratha Empire
