= Bahadur Khan (Mughal general) =

Mughal noble and general (died 1697)

Bahadur Khan Kokaltash بهادرخان کوکلتاش
- Bahadur; Khan; Nawab
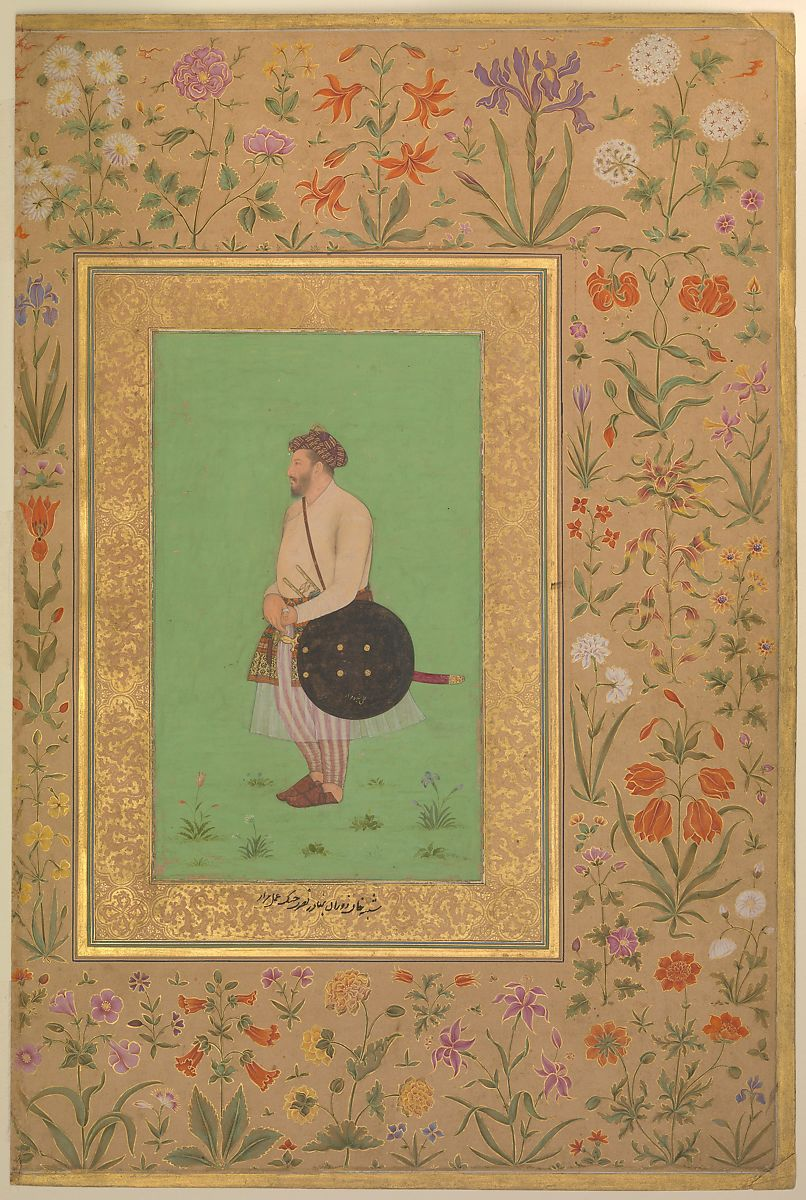
- Portrait of Bahadur Khan by Murad c. 1640

Subahdar of Deccan
- 1st Governorship: January 1673 – August 1677 (4.5 years)
- Predecessor: Prince Muazzam
- Successor: Diler Khan
- 2nd Governorship: 1 March 1680 – 1683 (3 years)
- Predecessor: Prince Muazzam
- Successor: Safi Khan
- Padishah: Alamgir I

Subahdar of Lahore
- Governorship: 11 April 1691 – midd of 1693 (2 years)
- Padishah: Alamgir I

Subahdar of Khandesh
- Governorship: 1678/79/80 – April 1691
- Padishah: Alamgir I

Subahdar of Gujarat
- Governorship: 1668–1670
- Padishah: Aurangzeb
- Predecessor: Mahabat Khan II
- Successor: Jaswant Singh
- Born: Bahadur Khan; Early-17th Century; Mughal Empire
- Died: 23 November 1697; Lahore, Mughal Empire (present day Pakistan)
- Burial: 23–24 November 1697; Tomb of Bahadur Khan Kokaltash, Lahore, Pakistan
- Issue: Muhammad Muhsin; Himmat Khan; Sipahdar Khan; Nasiri Khan; Muzaffar Khan; Abul Fatah
Names
- Birth name: Bahadur Khan; Full name: Bahadur Khan Kokaltash bin Mir Abul-Mali; Foster-name: Bahadur Khan Koka; Name with titles: Nawab Khan-e-Jahan Bahadur Zafar Jung Kokaltash
Era name and dates
- Mughal Era: 17th–Centuries
- Father: Sayyid-e Khafi" Mir Abu’l-Ma'ali
- Religion: Sunni Islam (Hanafi)
- Occupation: General; Governor; Statesman
- Military career
- Allegiance: Mughal Empire
- Branch: Nawab
- Service years: 1650s–1691 (in war)
- Conflicts: Mughal-Maratha wars: Battle of Salher (1672); Sacking of Burhanpur (1681); Battle of Kalyan (1682–1683); Siege of Ramsej (1682–1688)

Bahadur Khan Kokaltash (Persian: بهادرخان کوکلتاش; died 23 November 1697) was a foster-brother to the Mughal Emperor Aurangzeb and the Subahdar of Lahore, Burhanpur and the Deccan. Aurangzeb had two foster-brothers, the other being Fidai Khan Koka, of which Bahadur Khan was Aurangzeb's favourite. Bahadur was the Senior General of the Mughal Empire and a closer companion to the emperor Aurangzeb. He was one of the military commanders of the Mughals who assisted in the defeat of the Maratha Confederacy in one major battle, and won three major battles in his involvement in the Mughal–Maratha Wars. His tomb is located in Lahore, in present-day Pakistan. His father Mir Abu’l-Ma'ali was given the title of Sayyid-e-Khafi" by Aurangzeb.

== Biography ==
Bahadur Khan Kokaltash, full name Nawab Khan-e-Jahan Bahadur Zafar Jung Kokaltash, was the Mughal Governor, noble and Military Commander of the Mughal Empire during the reign of emperor Aurangzeb. He is first mentioned in historical records as a senior military general and foster brother of Aurangzeb. Later, he was appointed as the Subahdar of Burhanpur, which is a city in central India, holding this position from an unknown date until 1691.

As Subahdar of Deccan for long years, he fought against marathas in many battles, with one of first battles mentioned in February 1672 CE. During the war against marathas at the Battle of Salher, he was a military commander. In this battle which was a result of Mughal attempt to retake the fort of Salher, Moropant Peshwa, Prataprao Gurjar, Anandrao, Suryaji Kakde and others led the Maratha army. Marathas prevailed in this bloody open battle. Bahadur Khan and Diler Khan failed to retake Salher. This war highly lifted of Maratha army. Bahadur Khan built a fort for his garrison at Pedgaon at the bank of Bheema. This fort was sacked and plundered by the Marathas, Bahadur being lured in a pursuit by a smaller Maratha force. Returning from his failed chase Bahadur found his camp polished off. Shivaji once again fooled Bahadur by proposing vassal status to Aurangzeb (via Bahadur) and asking mansab for Sambhaji. This time was utilised by Shivaji to concentrate his forces for the Ponda and subsequent south campaign. Bahadur was ultimately recalled by Aurangzeb and replaced by Diler Khan. Many years later, he become Subedar of Burhanpur. When Bahadur khan Kokaltash was going to Aurangabad for his nephew's wedding with a girl from the royal family of Abul Hasan Qutb Shah, he took a force of 3,000 armies with him for the wedding and left Burhanpur with an army of 5,000 under his Deputy-Commander Kakar Khan. The Maratha ruler Sambhaji got that news then he decided to further bifurcate the force at Burhanpur by feigning a move to attack Surat, forcing the Mughals at Burhanpur to send reinforcement to Surat, the marathas successfully sacked the city. Bahadur Khan got angry and wanted to get revenge on Marathas, on 3 April 1680 Marathas ruler Shivaji died, in April–May 1680, Mughal emperor Aurangzeb campaign against marathas for 27 years war between Mughal-Marathas. then Bahadur Khan involved and he fought a Battle of Kalyan in 1682 to 1683, Subedar Bahadur Khan defeated the Maratha army and took over Kalyan. The Maratha ruler Sambhaji attempted a counter offensive, but failed and they were repulsed by Mughal forces. he expanded his conquest in Kalyan, then the year (1682 – 1688) Bahadur Khan Siege at Ramsej at six years war Mughals annexed Ramsej Fort. and he involved the Mughal-Maratha war for ten and half years then Aurangzeb dissolved him as Burhanpur Subedar and sent him for Subedari of Lahore in present-day Pakistan he appoint as governor post for (11 April 1691 – Mid of 1693) Aurangzeb dismissed him from this office. four years later, Khan-e-Jahan Bahadur Khan Kokaltash died on 23 November 1697 in Lahore and he was buried in his tomb named Tomb of Bahadur Khan.

He had six known sons. His oldest son, Muhammad Muhsin had died in battle. His other sons were Himmat Khan, Sipahdar Khan, Muzaffar Khan, Nasiri Khan and Abul Fatah. Himmat Khan served as a general against the Marathas, while Sipahdar Khan was the governor of Allahabad in 1707. Nasiri Khan died as a madman, while Abul Fatah, Bahadur Khan's youngest son, died in affliction during Muhammad Shah's reign.
