= Tomb of Khan-e-Jahan Bahadur Kokaltash =

17th-century monument in Lahore, Pakistan

- مقبرہ خانِ جہاں بہادر کوکلتاش
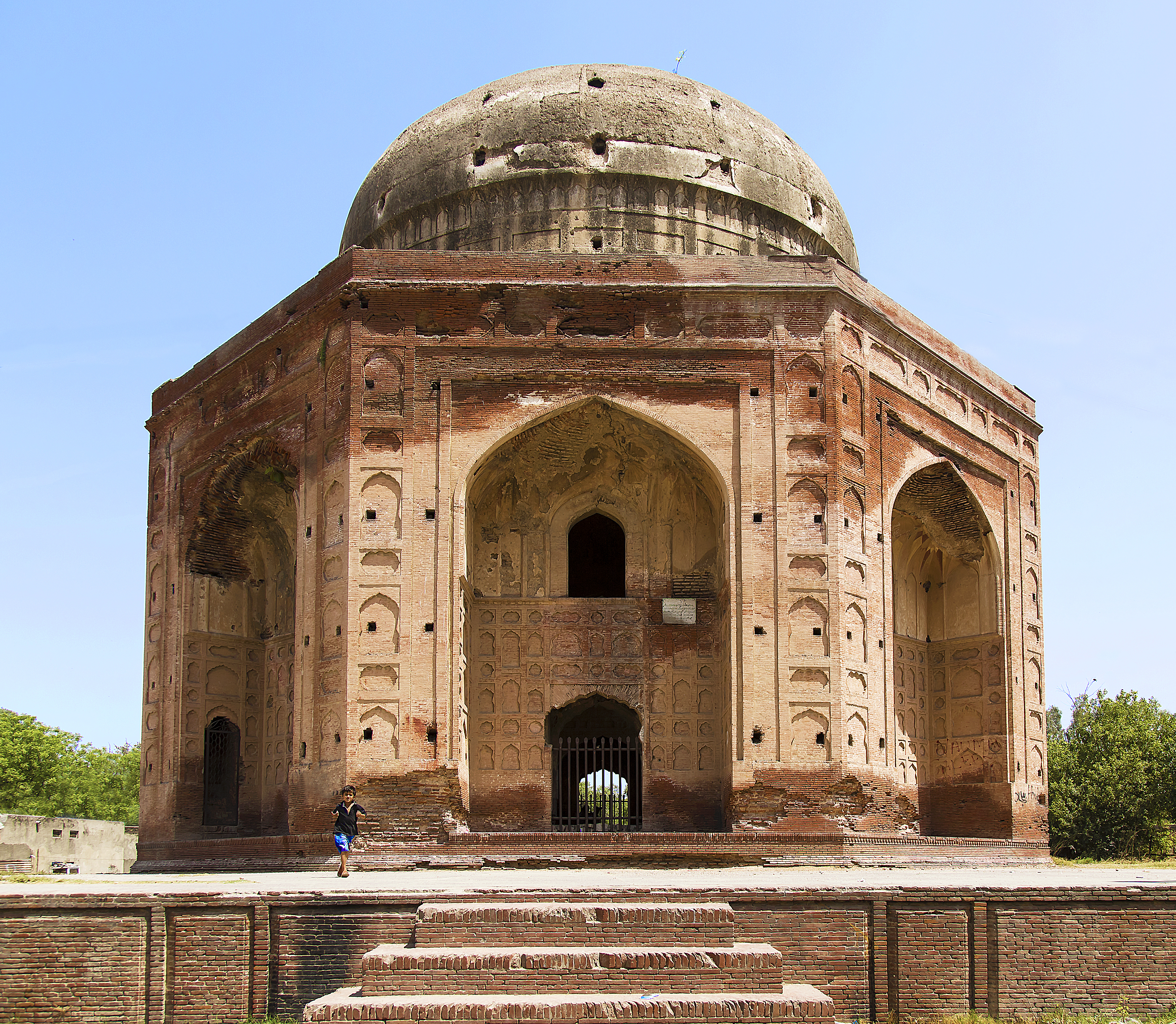
- Tomb of Khan-e-Jahan Bahadur Kokaltash

Location
- Location: LARECHS Society , Lahore, Punjab, Pakistan
- Interactive map of Tomb of Khan-e-Jahan Bahadur Kokaltash
- Coordinates: 31°33′34.74″N 74°21′59.57″E

Architecture
- Type: Tomb
- Style: Indo-Islamic, Mughal
- Completed: c. December 1697–1698

Specifications
- Dome: 1
- Dome dia. (inner): 30.1752 meters (99 foot)
- Materials: Bricks, marble

Tomb of Khan-e-Jahan Bahadur Kokaltash (Urdu: مقبرہ خانِ جہاں بہادر کوکلتاش) is a 17th-century tomb of a Mughal governor that is located in Railway Workshops Area, in the Pakistani city of Lahore's LARECHS Cooperative Society. He was a foster-brother to the Emperor Aurangzeb Alamgir.

== History ==
Khan-e-Jahan Bahadur Zafar Jung Kokaltash served as the Mughal Sūbahdar (governor) of Lahore from 11 April 1691 – 1693. In mid-1693, Aurangzeb dismissed him from this office. Four years later, Khan-e-Jahan died on 23 November 1697 in Lahore and he was buried here, in this tomb.

Historic evidences are obscure about Khan-e-Jahan. Historians have different views about who is buried here. Historian Kanhaiya Lal remarks that he was a Vizier and Umrā-ul-Umrā during the reign of the Mughal Emperor Akbar and that he died in 1602. He was a noble-man, named Khan-e-Jahan Bahadur Zafar Jung Kokaltash, during the reign of Mughal Emperor Aurangzeb.

Most historians disagree on Kanhaiya Lal's remark. Another historian, Noor Ahmed Chishti in his "Tehqeeqt-e-Chishti" did not have any written views about Khan-e-Jahan Bahadur, but only wrote about the tomb's structure.

It has been rumored that some English chiefs had converted this tomb into a dancing house.

The grave of Khan-e-Jahan was demolished in Ranjit Singh's Era when the Sikh Empire collapsed in 1849, and construction of Lahore Cantonment was underway. It is one of the last tombs built in the late era of Aurangzeb.

== Structure ==
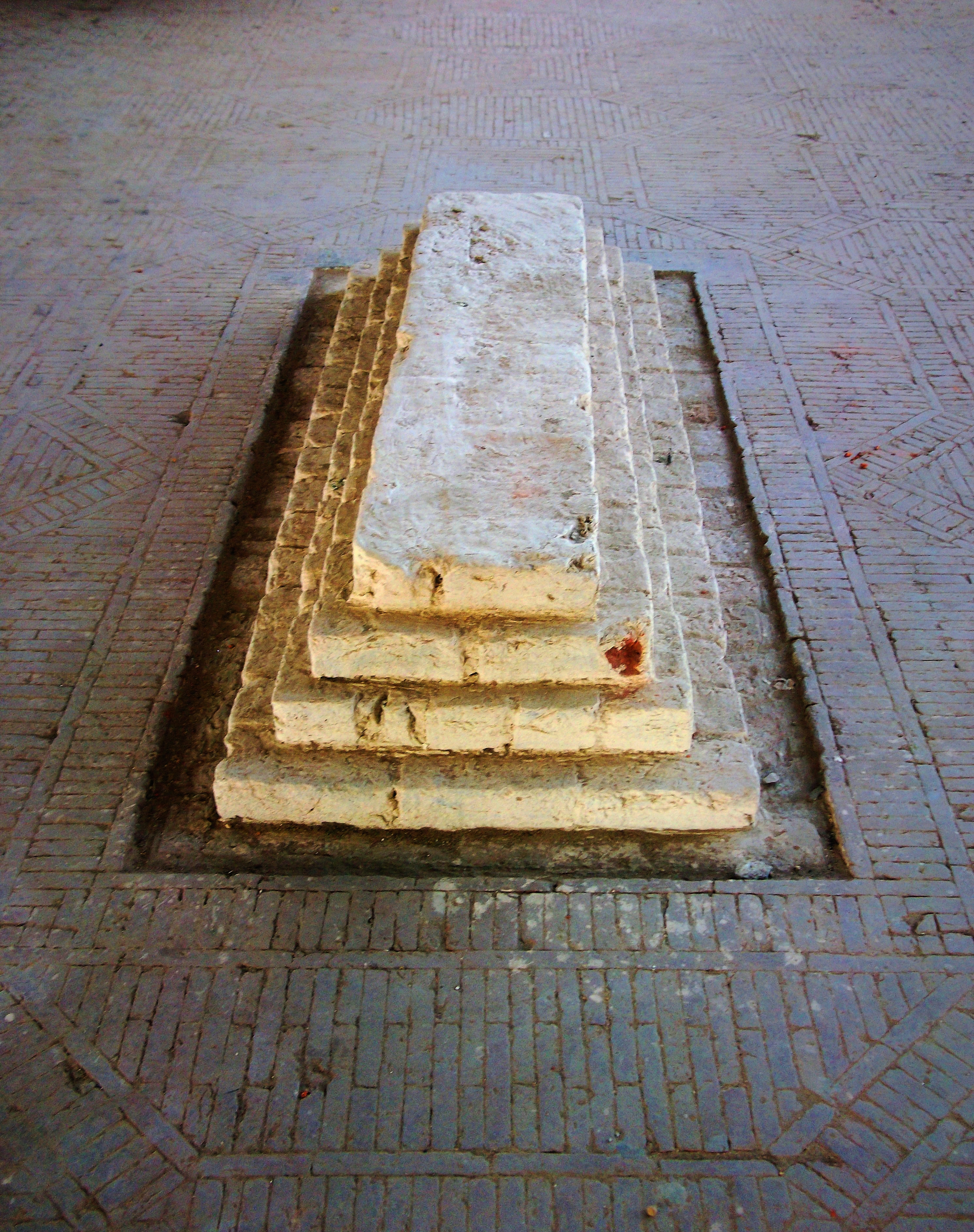
Present grave site of Khan-e-Jahan Bahadur Kokaltash in the tomb

The tomb was built in 1697–1698, after the death of Khan-e-Jahan. But certain years of construction are unknown. It is built on an octagonal platform with bricks and marble. The tomb is mainly in octagonal shape of architecture.

The grave was adorned with marble. In the early British India period, it was demolished, when the construction of the Mian-Mir Cantonment was underway. The tomb is a two-storey building and the upper floor may be accessed via a stairway.

== Conservation ==
The mausoleum is protected under the Punjab Special Premises Act of 1975. The present appearance is much denuded. In the Indo-Pakistani War of 1965, most of southern and eastern facade collapsed. The dome is now supported by a brick-pillar of modern design. The Kalib-Kari (Muqarnas) of upper storey is also damaged.

== Gallery ==
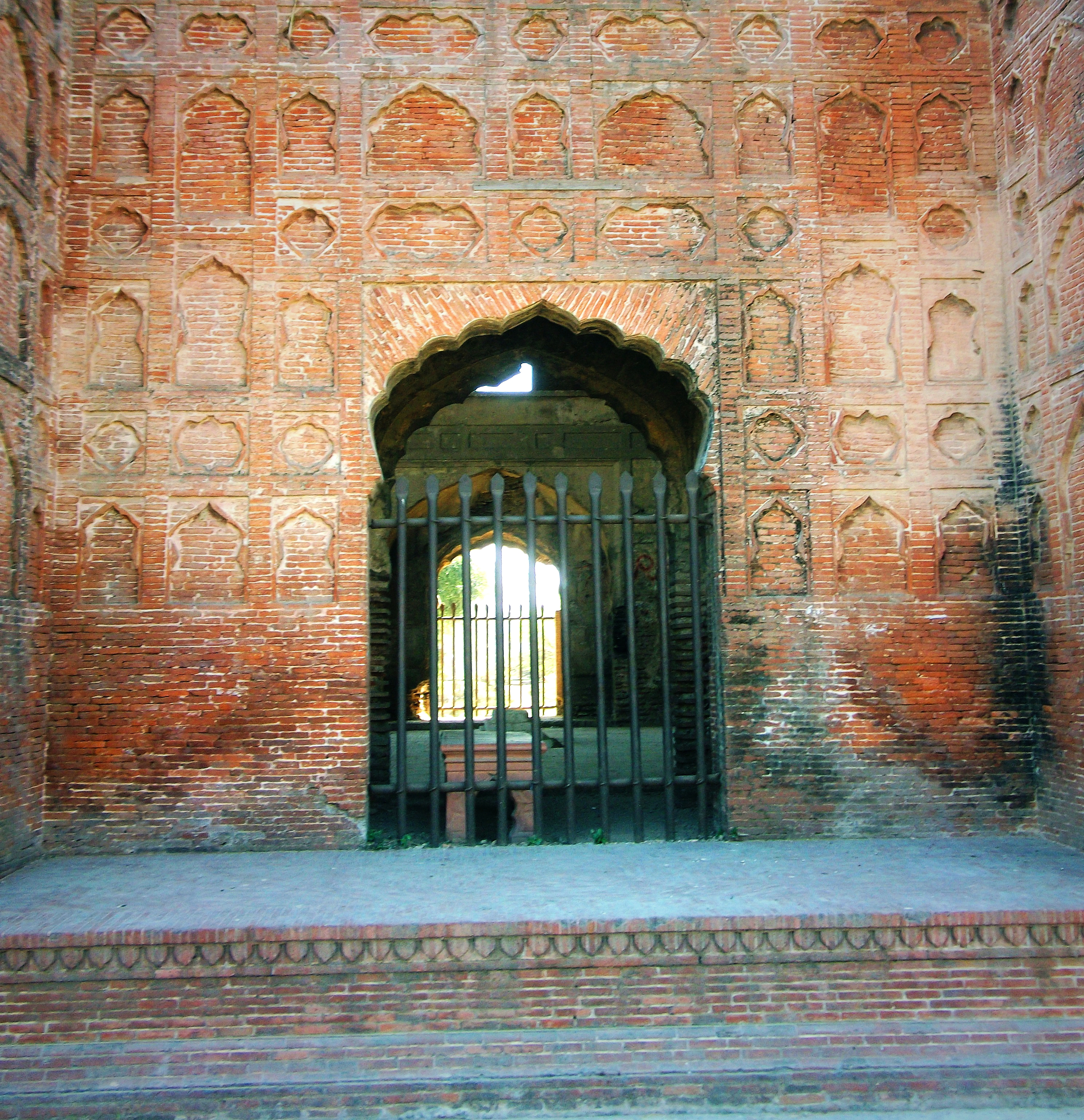
Southwest-Entrance of the tomb

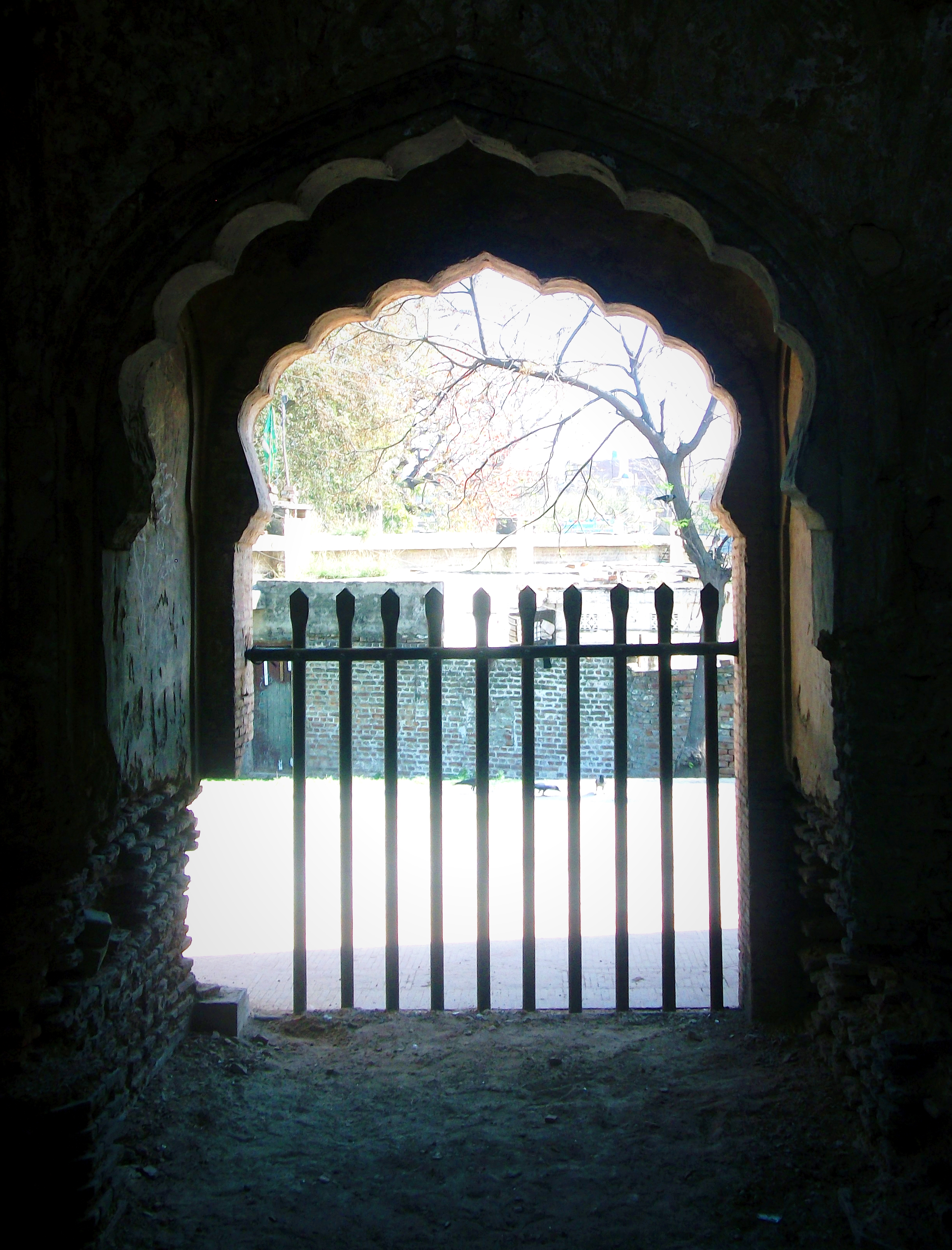
Eastern Facade of the tomb

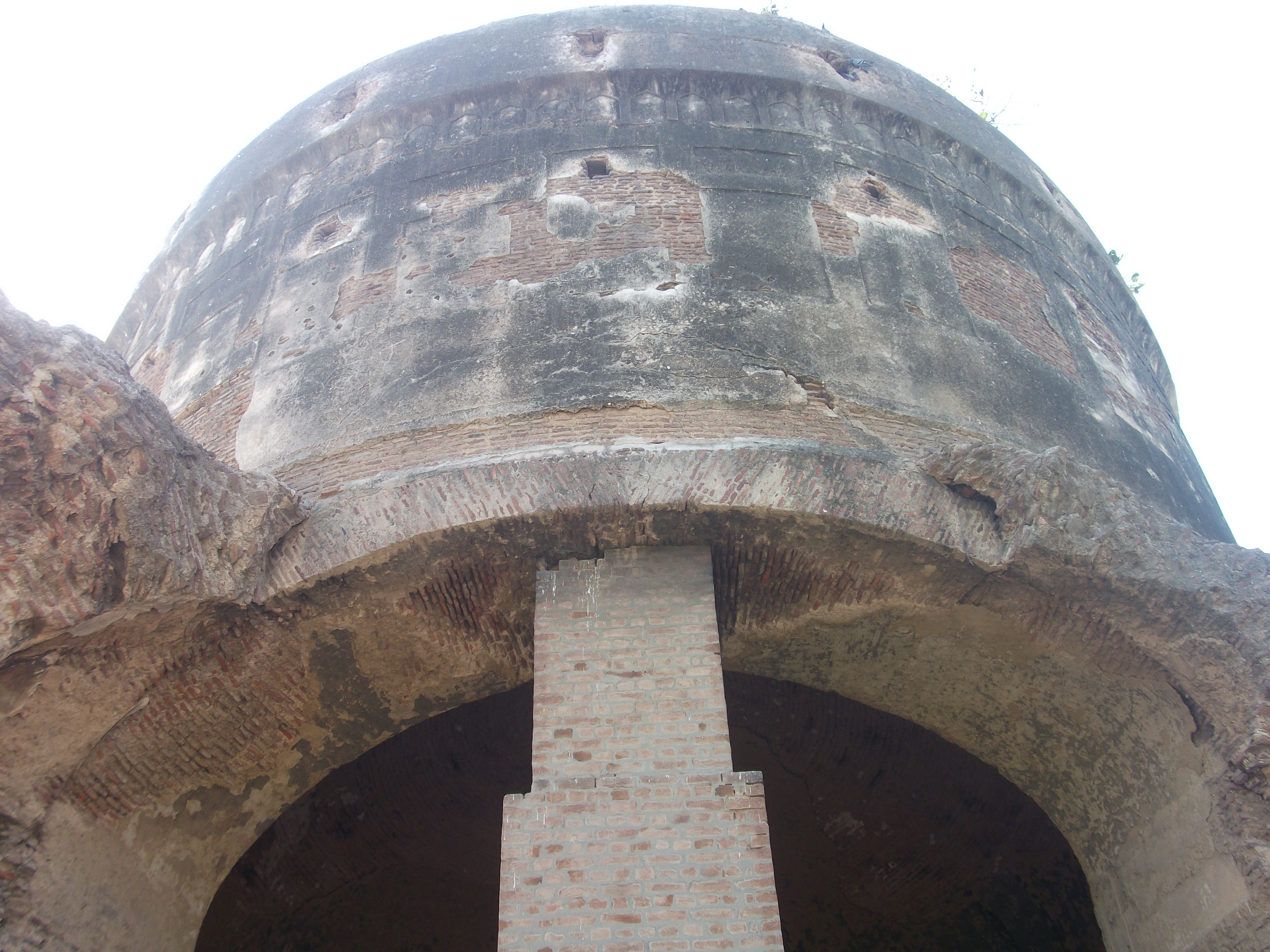
Dome of the Tomb, seen from southern facade, and modern brick-pillar is behind the dome.

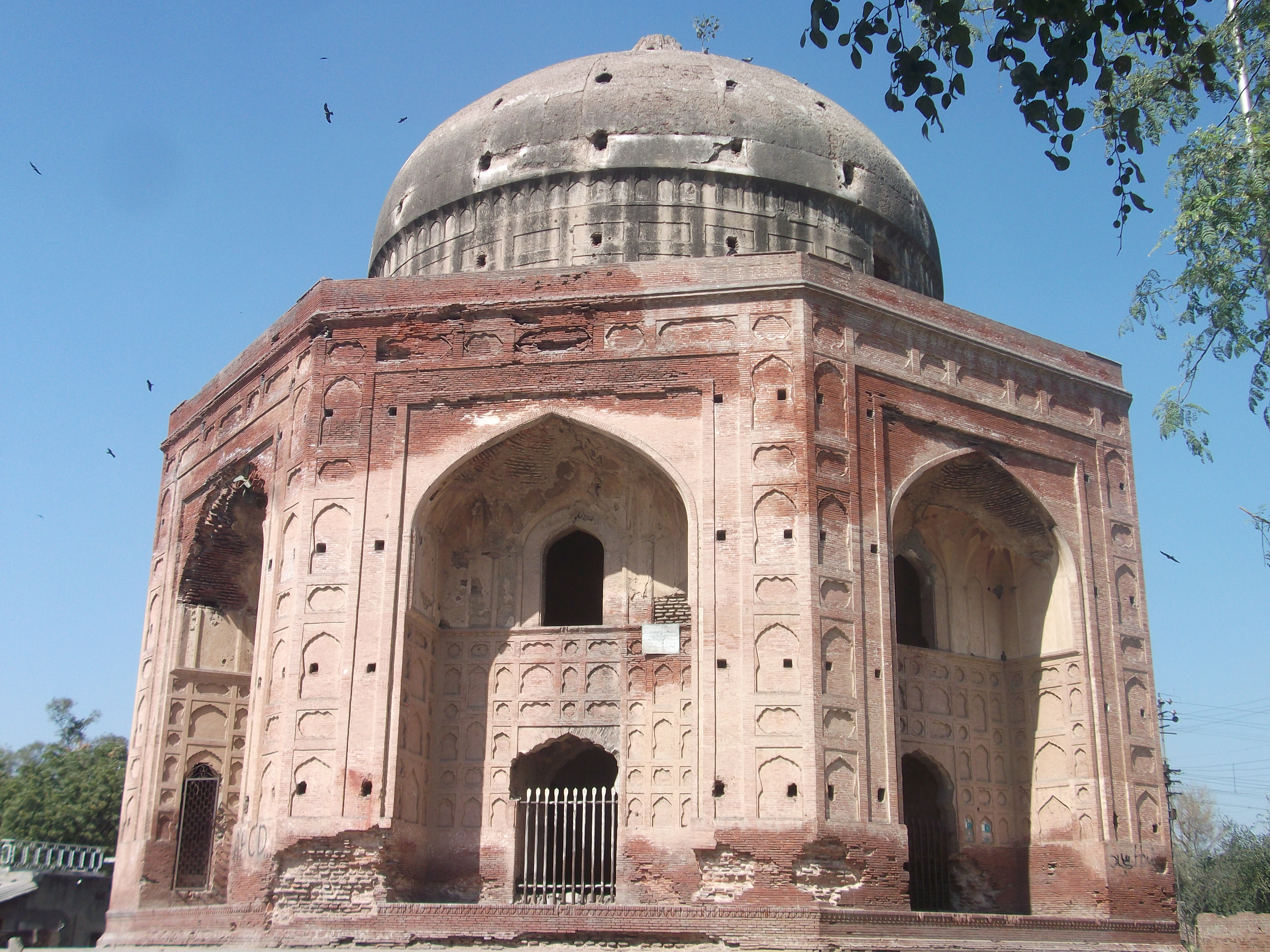
Western Facade of the tomb

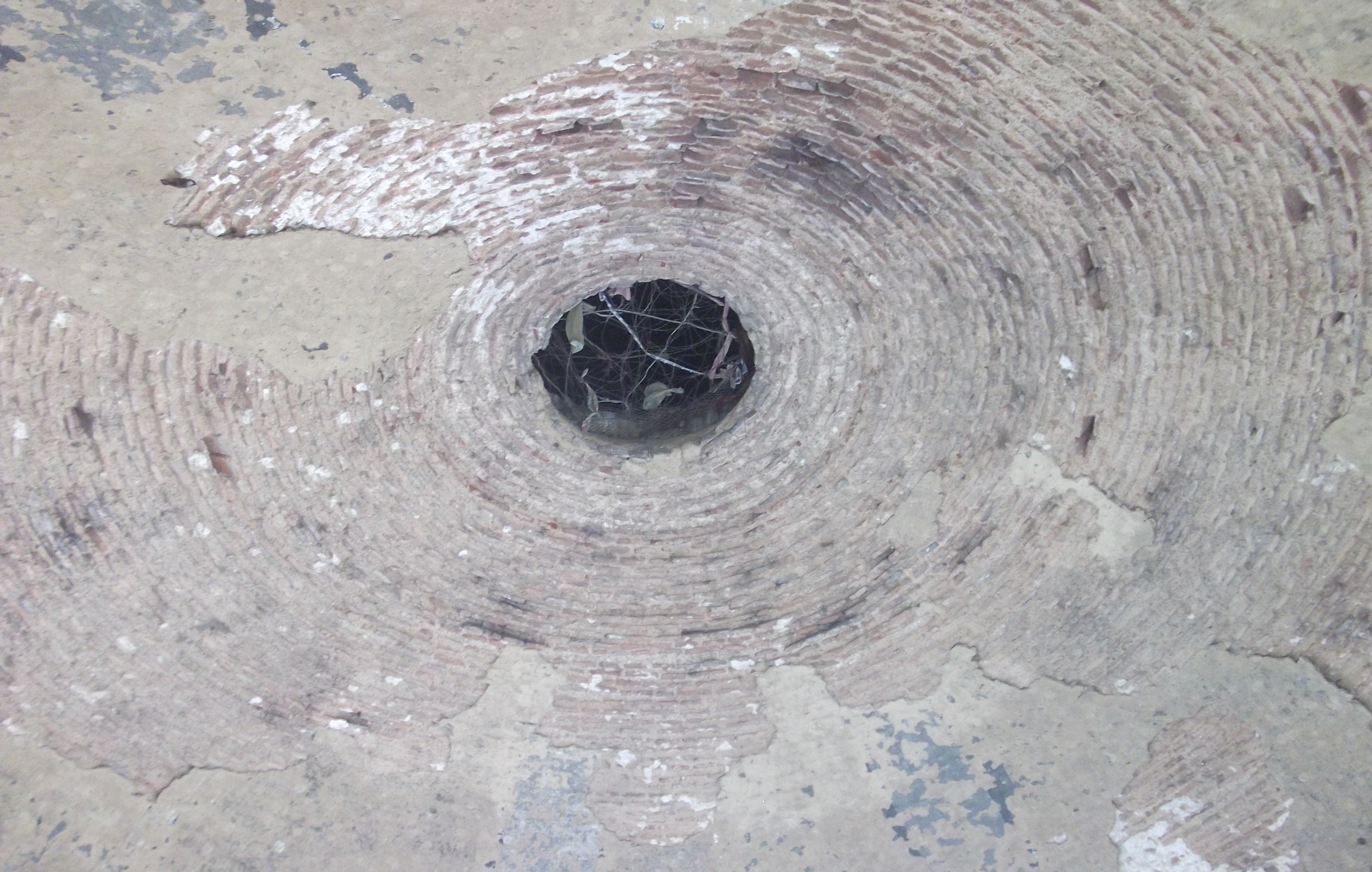
Interior Dome of the tomb

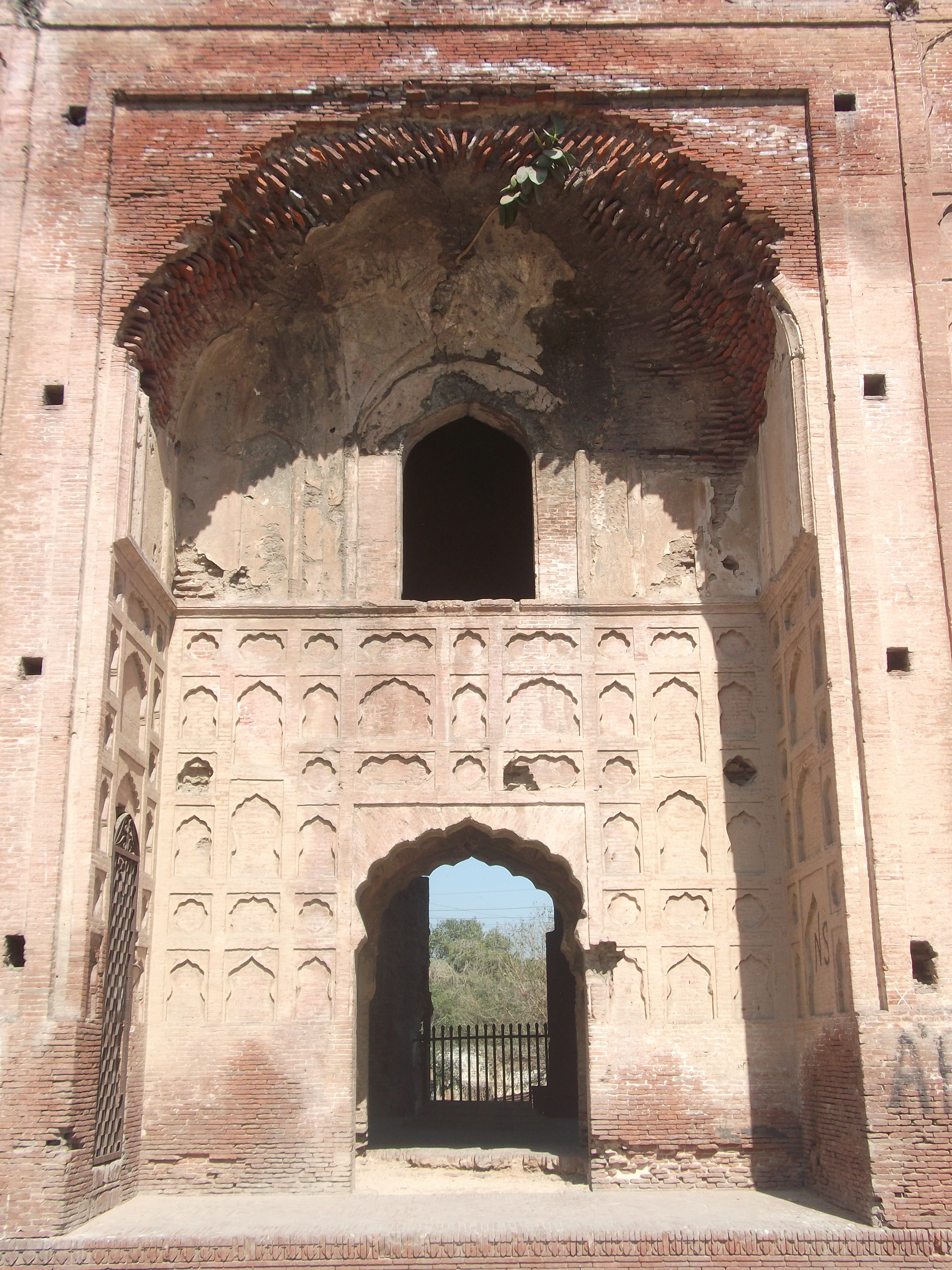
Southern-West Facade of the tomb

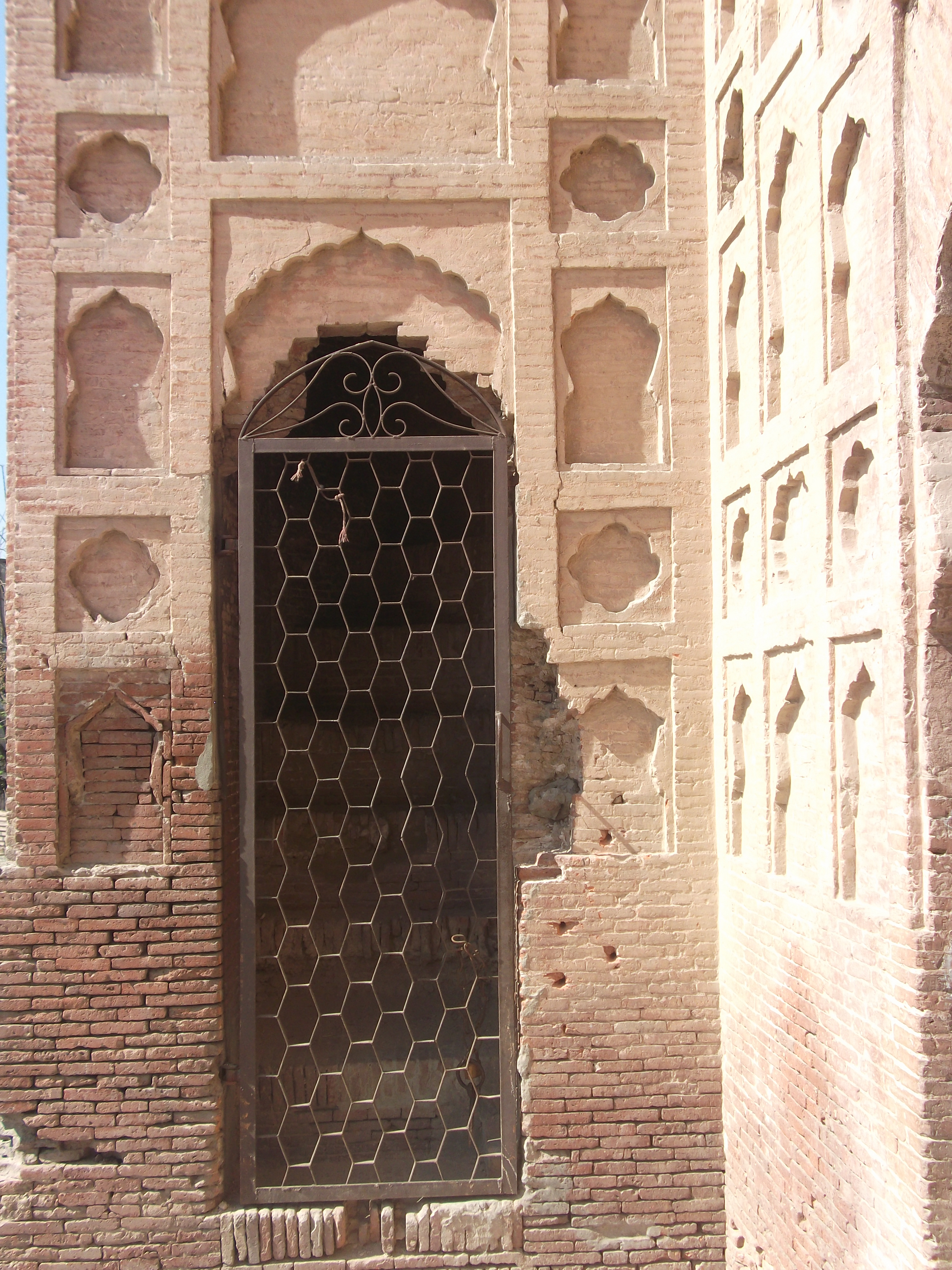
Stairs of the tomb for Upper storey

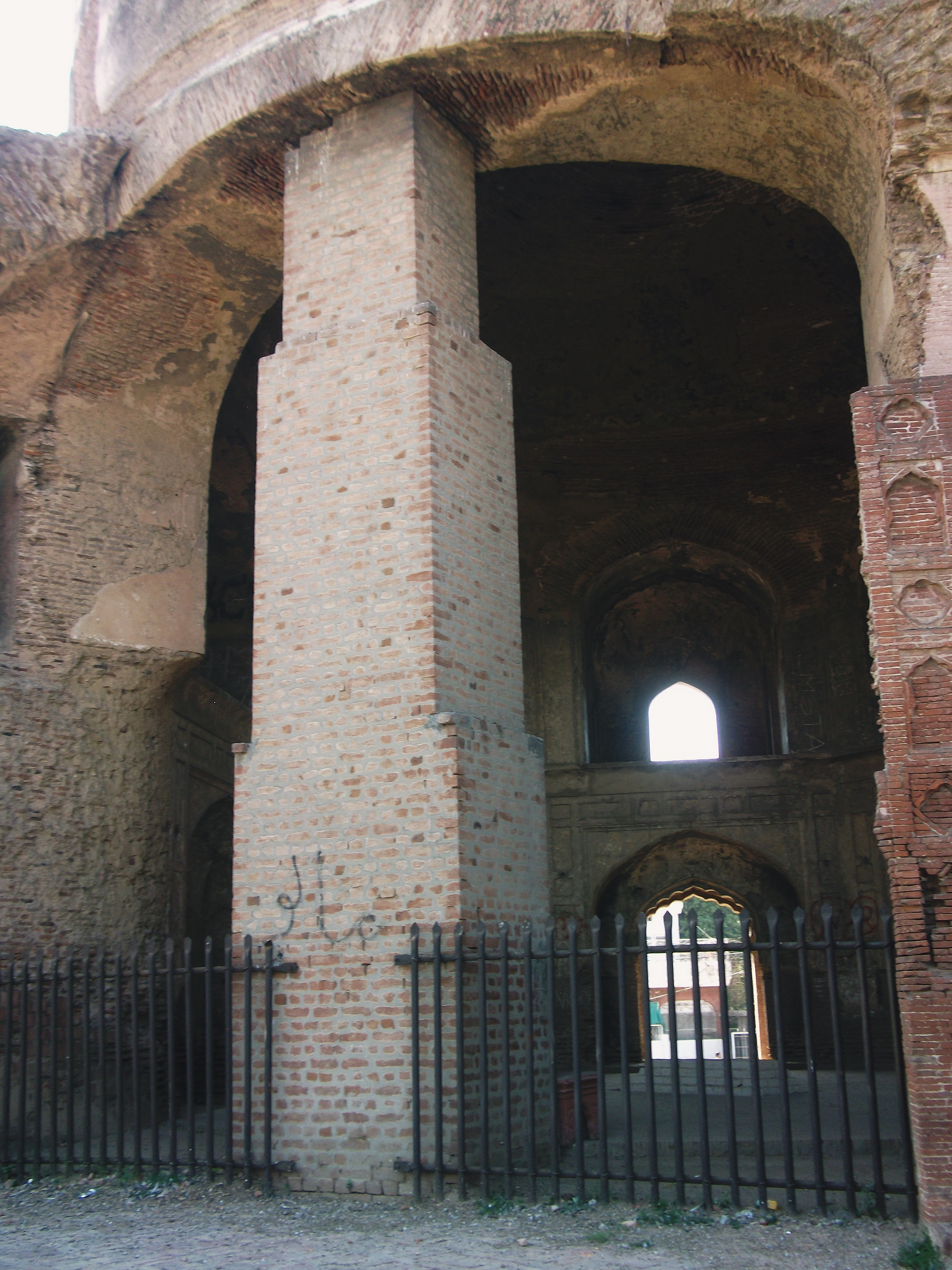
Brick-Pillar in the Eastern Side of the tomb

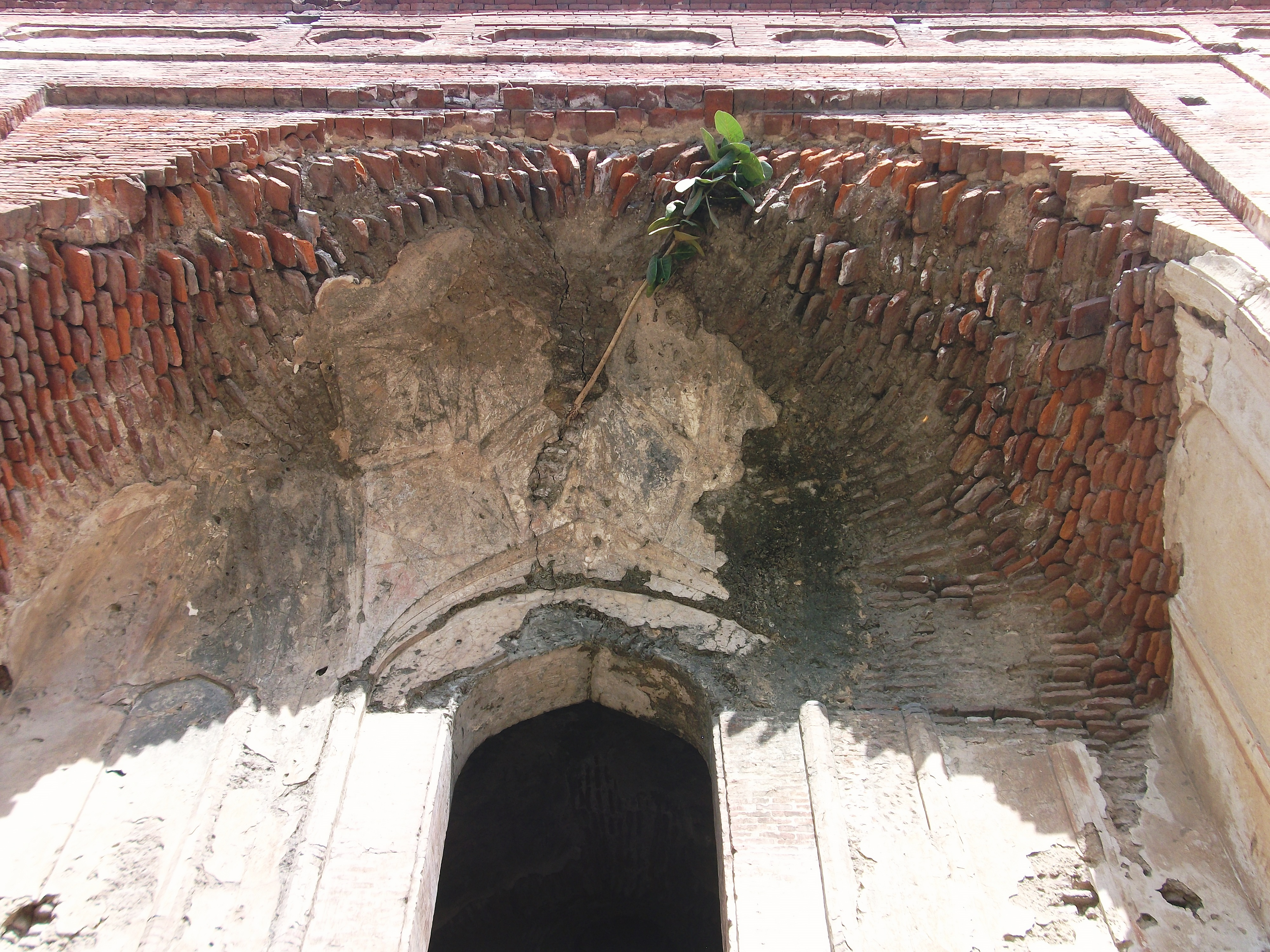
Niche in Western Side of the tomb

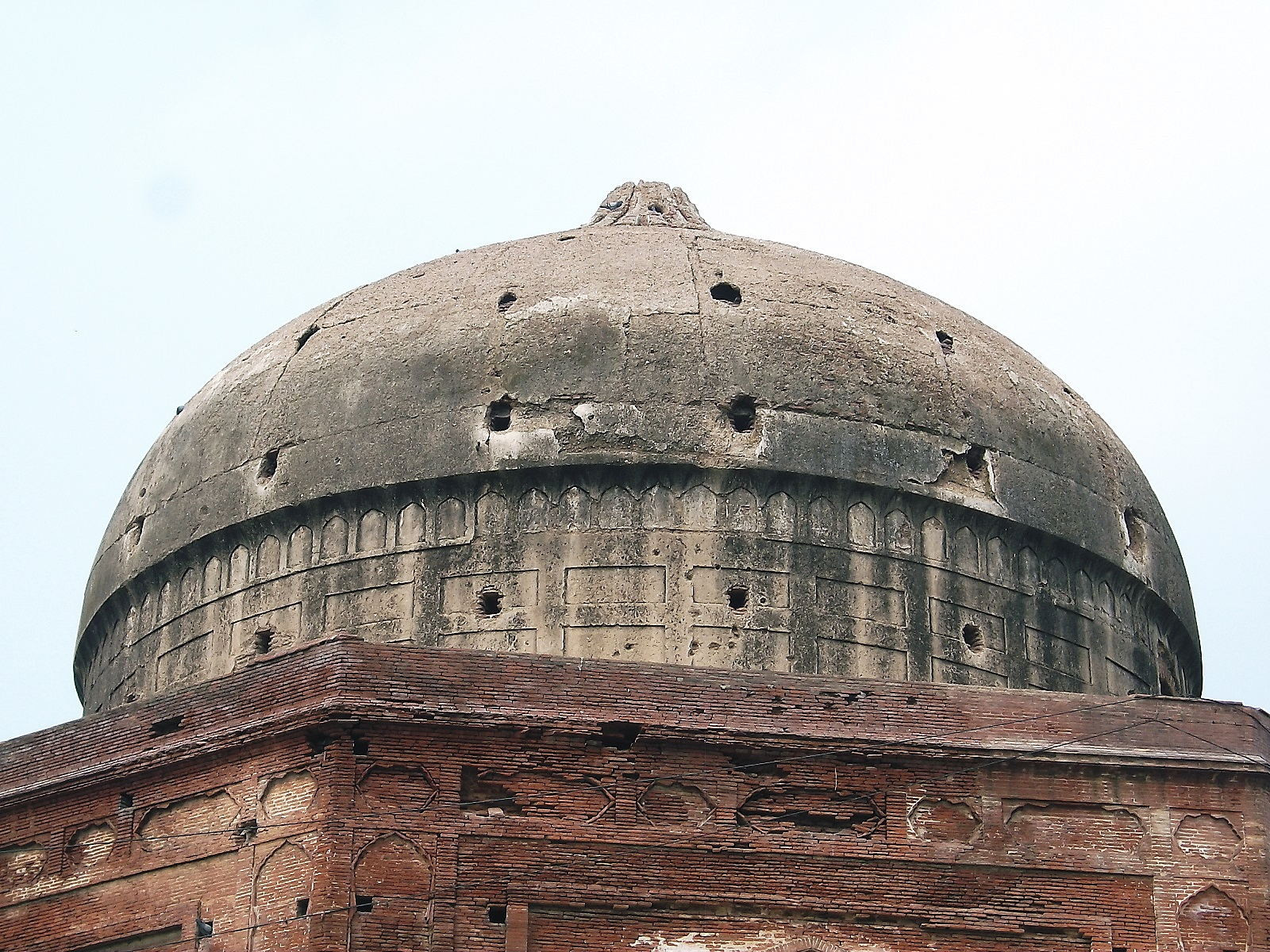
Exterior view of the dome

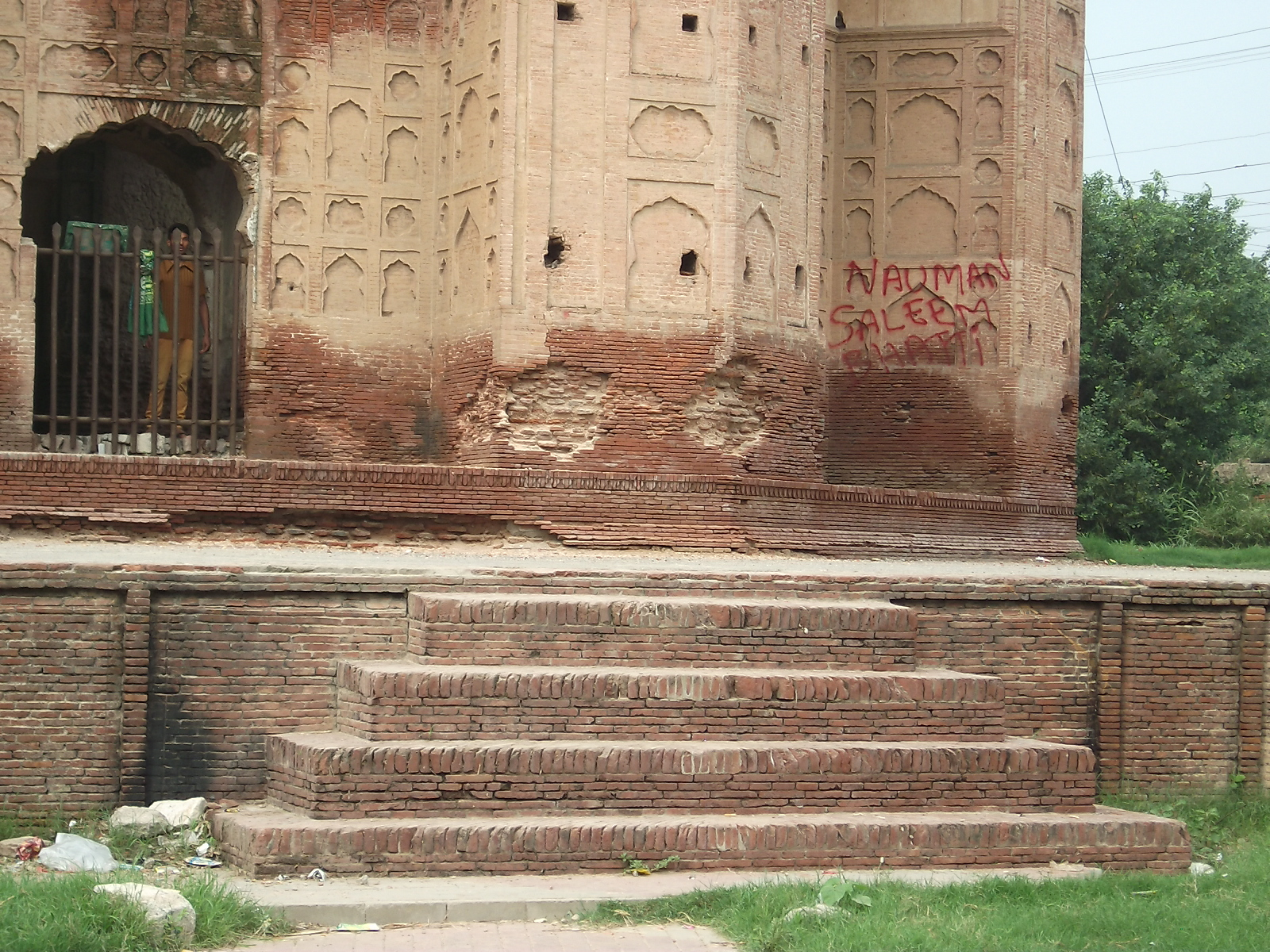
Stairs of Ground floor of the tomb

== See also ==
- Tomb of Anarkali
- Tomb of Ali Mardan Khan
- Tomb of Asif Khan
