= Battle of Wai =

1687 battle of the Mughal-Maratha Wars

- Part of Mughal-Maratha Wars
Date	December 1687
Location	Wai, Maharashtra
Result	Maratha victory

Belligerents
Mughal Empire	Maratha Empire

Commanders and leaders
Sarja Khan	Hambirrao Mohite †; Bhikajirao Korde Patil †

The Battle of Wai was fought in December of 1687 as a part of the Mughal–Maratha Wars. Maratha king Sambhaji sent his forces to counteract Sarja Khan, sent by Aurangzeb for the purpose of conquering Raigad.

== Background ==
In April 1685, Mughal emperor Aurangzeb managed to consolidate his power by first capturing Maratha allies, the Muslim kingdoms of Golconda and Bijapur. He broke his treaties with both kingdoms, attacked them and captured them by September 1686. While Aurangzeb was away at the Siege of Golconda, the Mughals invaded Satara district. And after his victory at Golconda, Aurangzeb was able to concentrate on the Marathas.

== Battle ==
Maratha Commander-in-Chief Hambirrao Mohite led the Maratha side in the battle. Sarja Khan (a Bijapur general who joined the Mughals) led the Mughal forces. Although the Marathas won, Hambirao Mohite was struck and killed by a cannonball during the battle.

== Aftermath ==
While the battle was a victory for the Marathas, the loss of the celebrated Hambirao Mohite weakened Sambhaji Maharaj's political position considerably and many of his troops deserted him. Hambirao was replaced as senapati by Malhoji Ghorpade. Chhatrapati Sambhaji Maharaj went to the Western Ghats along with his close friend and counselor Kavi Kalash, leading eventually to the Mughal Army surrounding the Sambhaji Maharaj's camp and capturing the Maratha king.
