= Mantrik =

Hindu Magic

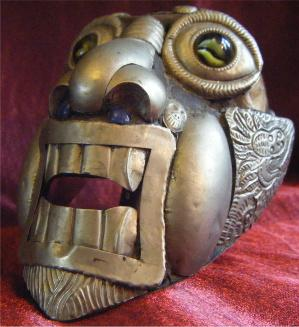
Kapala used by mantrik

A Mantrik or mantric is someone who specializes in practicing mantra. In the Indian subcontinent, the word mantrik & similar names are synonymous with magician in different languages. Generally, a mantrik is supposed to derive his powers from the use of charms, mantras, spells and other methods. A Hindu mantrik is known to worship Kali and is often mentioned in the same breath as tantric, though there are subtle differences.

A mantrik is one who chants to please a god for his benefit. Mantras are sacred chantings containing magical and mystical words. A mantrik is known for his use of sorcery and magic and can be called upon for the casting of spells and magic, divination, astrology and all aspects of sorcery. Mantriks are normally associated with the darker side of magic and its relevant practices.
