= Sacking of Burhanpur =

1681 Maratha raid

Battle of Burhanpur (1681)
- Part of the Mughal-Maratha Wars
Date	31 January – 2 February 1681 (2 days)
Location	Burhanpur, Burhanpur District Madhya Pradesh 21.3°N 76.23°E
Result	Maratha victory

Belligerents
Maratha Empire	Mughal Empire

Commanders and leaders
Sambhaji; Hambirrao Mohite; Kavi Kalash; Suryaji Jake	Bahadur Khan Kokaltash; Kakar Khan (POW)

The sacking of Burhanpur (31 January – 2 February 1681) refers to the looting of the wealthy city of Burhanpur in Madhya Pradesh by the Maratha ruler Sambhaji. The Maratha army commanded by Sambhaji and Sersenapati Sarlashkar Hambirrao Mohite attacked and plundered the city for three days. Maratha raiders carried out rape, looting and torture of the civilians. The Marathas got a huge loot and returned to Raigad by evading Mughal forces. Marathas also sacked Aurangabad after this sack. This event caused the Mughal emperor Aurangzeb to turn his expedition towards the Deccan, which caused the execution of Sambhaji.

== Sacking of Burhanpur ==
Hambirrao Mohite reached the forests near Burhanpur with a 15,000-strong cavalry force. Kakar Khan gathered civilian forces and decided to attack Hambirrao at midnight. As he came out of the city gates, Sambhaji Maharaj himself attacked from the old trenches with a cavalry force of 4,000. Sambhaji Maharaj's force routed the ill-prepared Mughal garrison. Sambhaji Maharaj then left 200-300 soldiers at the main city gate and left for Bahadurpura, the richest suburb of the city. Sambhaji Maharaj started to loot the houses of the richest merchants which were shown to him by his spies. Hambirrao's force soon joined Sambhaji Maharaj and the combined Maratha force started looting the city. Hambirrao, then sealed the city's entrances to ensure that the word of the attack did not spread. Marathas looted the city consecutively for three days. Marathas earned a loot estimated to be around 2 crore rupees.

== Popular culture ==
The Battle of Burhanpur is portrayed in the Marathi television series Swarajya Rakshak Sambhaji, featuring Amol Kolhe as Sambhaji, where it is depicted in detail.

The event is depicted in the opening scenes of the Bollywood film 'Chhaava' (2025).
