= Talbid =

Village in Maharashtra

- Village
- Location in Maharashtra, India Talbid (India)
- Coordinates: 17.35°N 74.13°E
- Country: India
- State: Maharashtra
- District: Satara

Government
  - Type: gram panchayat

Population
  - Total: 4,572

Languages
  - Official: Marathi
- Time zone: UTC+5:30 (IST)
- Website: www.satara.nic.in

Talbid (Village ID 564533) is a village near Karad, in Satara district of state Maharashtra, India. According to the 2011 census it has a population of 4572 living in 1001 households.
