= Yusufkhan Mohamadkhan Pathan =

Marathi writer

Yusufkhan Mohamadkhan Pathan is an authority on Maratha saints. He was born on 1 March 1930. He has been head of department, Marathwada University, Aurangabad, Maharashtra, India In 2007, he received a Padma Shri award from the Government of India for excellence in literature and education. O'Hanlon cites his as the editor of Bhausahebanchi bakhar, Deshpande cites him as the editor of the Sabhasad Bakhar. In 2004 he received the Indian Independence day Certificate of honour for Persian language.
