= Sonale, Dahanu =

Village in Maharashtra

Sonale
- village
- Location in Maharashtra, India Sonale (India)
- Coordinates: 19.935027°N 72.9490094°E
- Country: India
- State: Maharashtra
- District: Palghar
- Taluka: Dahanu
- Elevation: 59 m (194 ft)

Population (2011)
  - Total: 905
- Time zone: UTC+5:30 (IST)
- 2011 census code: 551681

Sonale is a village in the Palghar district of Maharashtra, India. It is located in the Dahanu taluka.

The Prakritized form of the Sanskrit name "Suvarna-pallam" is mentioned as a name of Sonale in the 15th-17th century Marathi-language text Mahikavatichi Bakhar.

== Demographics ==
According to the 2011 census of India, Sonale has 168 households. The effective literacy rate (i.e. the literacy rate of population excluding children aged 6 and below) is 45.36%.

Demographics (2011 Census)
	Total	Male	Female
Population	905	460	445
Children aged below 6 years	151	92	59
Scheduled caste	0	0	0
Scheduled tribe	905	460	445
Literates	342	216	126
Workers (all)	490	243	247
Main workers (total)	437	218	219
Main workers: Cultivators	413	204	209
Main workers: Agricultural labourers	10	5	5
Main workers: Household industry workers	4	1	3
Main workers: Other	10	8	2
Marginal workers (total)	53	25	28
Marginal workers: Cultivators	45	24	21
Marginal workers: Agricultural labourers	7	1	6
Marginal workers: Household industry workers	0	0	0
Marginal workers: Others	1	0	1
Non-workers	415	217	198
