= Talavali Tarf Sonale =

Village in Maharashtra

- village
- Location in Maharashtra, India Talavali Tarf Sonale (India)
- Coordinates: 19.345574°N 73.1674128°E
- Country: India
- State: Maharashtra
- District: Thane
- Taluka: Bhiwandi
- Elevation: 22 m (72 ft)

Population (2011)
  - Total: 1,837
- Time zone: UTC+5:30 (IST)
- 2011 census code: 552608

Talavali Tarf Sonale is a village in the Thane district of Maharashtra, India. It is located in the Bhiwandi taluka.

The Prakritized form of the Sanskrit name "Talavali-pallika" is mentioned as a name of Talavali in the 15th-17th century Marathi-language text Mahikavatichi Bakhar, "pallika" being the Shilahara-era suffix for a small village.

== Demographics ==
According to the 2011 census of India, Talavali Tarf Sonale has 319 households. The effective literacy rate (i.e. the literacy rate of population excluding children aged 6 and below) is 82.04%.

Demographics (2011 Census)
	Total	Male	Female
Population	1837	946	891
Children aged below 6 years	250	123	127
Scheduled caste	133	79	54
Scheduled tribe	351	174	177
Literates	1302	716	586
Workers (all)	629	473	156
Main workers (total)	580	443	137
Main workers: Cultivators	49	41	8
Main workers: Agricultural labourers	18	7	11
Main workers: Household industry workers	17	11	6
Main workers: Other	496	384	112
Marginal workers (total)	49	30	19
Marginal workers: Cultivators	5	3	2
Marginal workers: Agricultural labourers	4	1	3
Marginal workers: Household industry workers	5	3	2
Marginal workers: Others	35	23	12
Non-workers	1208	473	735
