= Khambale =

Village in Maharashtra

- village
- Location in Maharashtra, India Khambale (India)
- Coordinates: 19.8730512°N 72.773255°E
- Country: India
- State: Maharashtra
- District: Palghar
- Taluka: Dahanu
- Elevation: 7 m (23 ft)

Population (2011)
  - Total: 1,104
- Time zone: UTC+5:30 (IST)
- ISO 3166 code: IN-MH
- 2011 census code: 551738

Khambale is a village in the Palghar district of Maharashtra, India. It is located in the Dahanu taluka.

The Prakritized form of the Sanskrit name "Skambha-pallam" is mentioned as a name of Khambale in the 15th-17th century Marathi-language text Mahikavatichi Bakhar.

== Demographics ==
According to the 2011 census of India, Khambale has 205 households. The effective literacy rate (i.e. the literacy rate of population excluding children aged 6 and below) is 73.19%.

Demographics (2011 Census)
	Total	Male	Female
Population	1104	563	541
Children aged below 6 years	123	69	54
Scheduled caste	1	1	0
Scheduled tribe	1062	539	523
Literates	718	401	317
Workers (all)	461	274	187
Main workers (total)	254	156	98
Main workers: Cultivators	7	4	3
Main workers: Agricultural labourers	80	60	20
Main workers: Household industry workers	3	3	0
Main workers: Other	164	89	75
Marginal workers (total)	207	118	89
Marginal workers: Cultivators	7	4	3
Marginal workers: Agricultural labourers	119	65	54
Marginal workers: Household industry workers	23	13	10
Marginal workers: Others	58	36	22
Non-workers	643	289	354
