= Bhausahebanchi Bakhar =

Narrative of the Battle of Panipat

Bhausahebanchi Bakhar is a narrative of the Third Battle of Panipat fought in 1761 between the Maratha Empire and the Durrani Empire of Ahmad Shah Durrani. It is written in the Marathi language. According to some historians, the author of the book was anonymous, but other historians have named one Krishnaji Shamrao as the author. Given the vivid descriptions, it is believed that Shamrao may have witnessed the battle. According to K. N. Sane, the angle and favorable remarks towards some characters in the narrative is suggestive of Shamrao being an official of the Scindia.
