= Shivaji =

Chhatrapati of the Marathas from 1674 to 1680

Shivaji I
- Raja; Shakakarta; Haindava Dharmoddharaka; Kshatriya Kulavantas
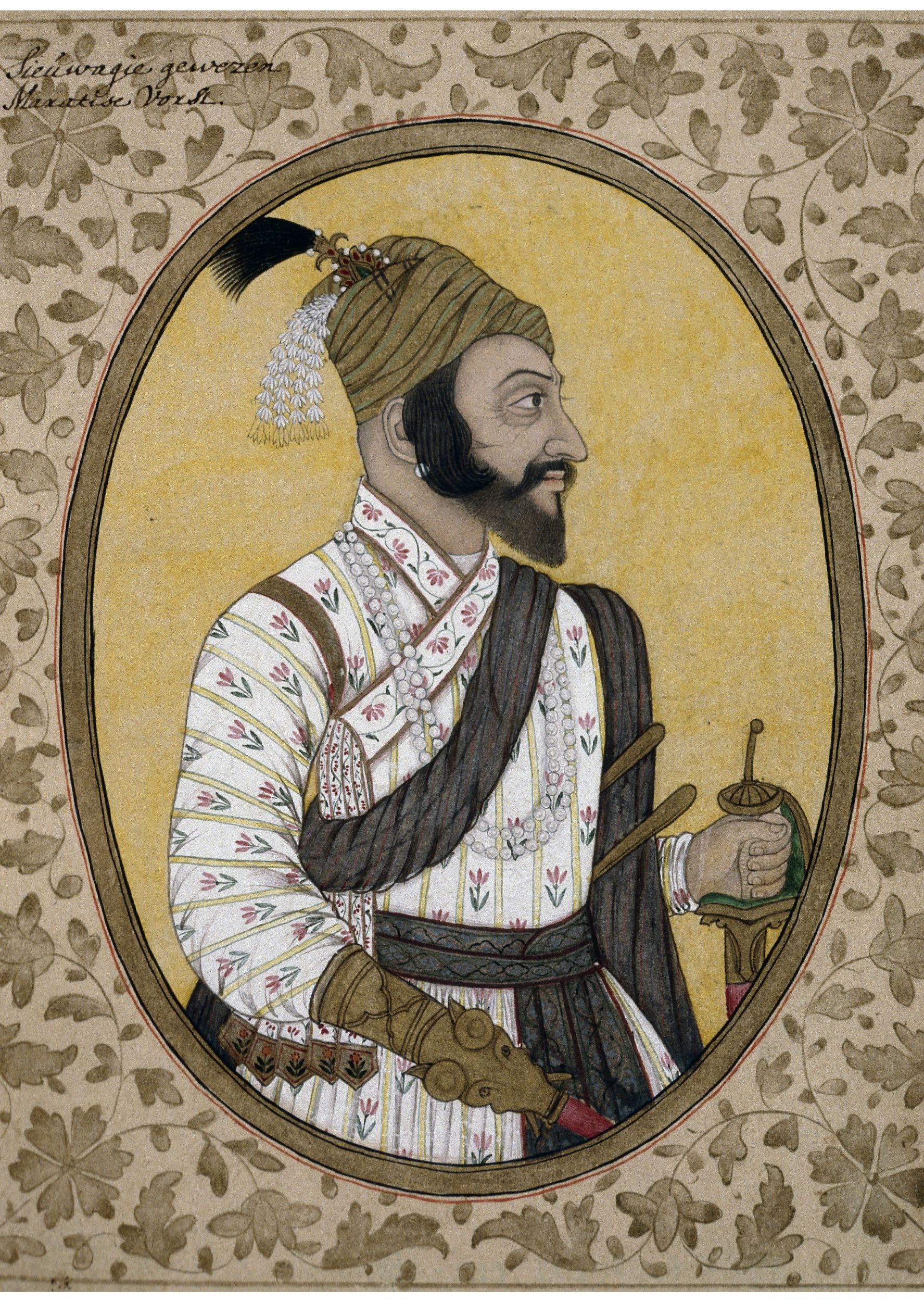
- Portrait of Shivaji (c. 1680s)

Chhatrapati of the Marathas
- Reign: 6 June 1674 – 3 April 1680
- Coronation: 6 June 1674 (first); 24 September 1674 (second)
- Predecessor: Position established
- Successor: Sambhaji
- Peshwa: Moropant Trimbak Pingle
- Born: 19 February 1630; Shivneri Fort, Ahmadnagar Sultanate
- Died: 3 April 1680 (aged 50); Raigad Fort, Mahad, Maratha Empire
- Spouse: Sai Bhonsale (m. 1640; died 1659) Soyarabai (m. 1650) Putalabai (m. 1653) Sakvarbai (m. 1657): Sagunabai Shirke; Kashibai Jadhav; Lakshmibai Vichare; Gunwantabai Ingle
- Issue: 8, including Sambhaji and Rajaram I
- House: Bhonsale
- Father: Shahaji
- Mother: Jijabai
- Religion: Hinduism
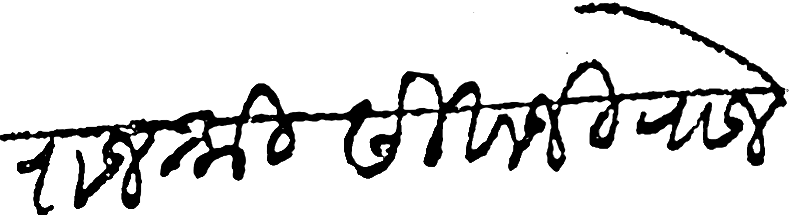
- Signature
- Military career
- Allegiance: Maratha Empire
- Conflicts: See list: Javali (1656); Pratapgarh (1659); Panhala (1660); Janjira (1661–76); Pavan Khind (1669); Pune (1663); Surat (1664); Purandar (1665); Ponda (1666); Sinhagad (1670); Surat (1670); Vani-Dindori (1670); Salher (1672); Shivneri (1673); Umrani (1673); Karnataka (1677); Gingee (1677); Vellore (1677–78); Bhupalgarh (1679)

Shivaji I (Shivaji Shahaji Bhonsale, Marathi pronunciation: [ʃiˈʋaːdʑiː ˈbʱos(ə)le]; c. 19 February 1630 – 3 April 1680) was an Indian ruler and a member of the Bhonsle dynasty. Shivaji inherited a fiefdom (Marathi: Jagir) from his father who served as a retainer for the Sultanate of Bijapur, which later formed the genesis of the Maratha Kingdom. In 1674, he was formally crowned the Chhatrapati of his realm at Raigad Fort.

Shivaji offered passage and his service to the Mughal emperor Aurangzeb to invade the declining Sultanate of Bijapur. After Aurangzeb's departure for the north due to a war of succession, Shivaji conquered territories ceded by Bijapur in the name of the Mughals. Following his defeat at the hands of Jai Singh I in the Battle of Purandar, Shivaji entered into vassalage with the Mughal empire, assuming the role of a Mughal chief. During this time Shivaji also wrote a series of letters apologising to Mughal emperor Aurangzeb for his actions and requested additional honors for his services. He was later conferred with the title of Raja by the emperor. He undertook military expeditions on behalf of the Mughal Empire for a brief duration.

In 1674, Shivaji was crowned as the king despite opposition from local Brahmins. Shivaji employed people of all castes and religions, including Muslims and Europeans, in his administration and armed forces. Over the course of his life, Shivaji engaged in both alliances and hostilities with the Mughal Empire, the Sultanate of Golconda, the Sultanate of Bijapur and the European colonial powers. Shivaji's military forces expanded the Maratha sphere of influence, capturing and building forts, and forming a Maratha navy.

Shivaji's legacy was revived by Jyotirao Phule about two centuries after his death. Later on, he came to be glorified by Indian nationalists such as Bal Gangadhar Tilak, and appropriated by Hindutva activists.

== Early life ==
Shivaji was born in the hill-fort of Shivneri near Junnar, which is now in Pune district. Scholars disagree on his date of birth; the Government of Maharashtra lists 19 February as a holiday commemorating Shivaji's birth (Shivaji Jayanti). (Note: Based on multiple committees of historians and experts, the Government of Maharashtra accepts 19 February 1630 as his birthdate. This Julian calendar date of that period (1 March 1630 of today's Gregorian calendar) corresponds to the Hindu calendar birth date from contemporary records. Other suggested dates include 6 April 1627 or dates near this day.) Shivaji was named after a local deity, the Goddess Shivai Devi.

Shivaji belonged to a Maratha family of the Bhonsle clan. Shivaji's father, Shahaji Bhonsle, was a Maratha general who served the Deccan Sultanates. His mother was Jijabai, the daughter of Lakhuji Jadhavrao of Sindhkhed, a Mughal-aligned sardar claiming descent from a Yadava royal family of Devagiri. His paternal grandfather Maloji (1552–1597) was an influential general of Ahmadnagar Sultanate, and was awarded the epithet of "Raja". He was given deshmukhi rights of Pune, Supe, Chakan, and Indapur to provide for military expenses. He was also given Shivneri fort for his family's residence (c. 1590).

At the time of Shivaji's birth, power in the Deccan was shared by three Islamic sultanates: Bijapur, Ahmednagar and Golkonda; and the Mughal Empire. Shahaji often changed his loyalty between the Nizamshahi of Ahmadnagar, the Adilshahi of Bijapur and the Mughals, but always kept his jagir (a type of fiefdom) at Pune and his small army.

Scholar James Laine states Shivaji was imbued with the dream of re-establishing a Hindu kingdom by his mother Jijabai, who was aware of her Yadava heritage and considered her husband "a collaborator of low birth."

== Ancestry ==
Ancestors of Shivaji

8.Babaji
4. Maloji
2.Shahaji
5.Uma Bai
1. Shivaji I
12.Vithoji
6.Lakhuji Jadhav
13.Thakrai
3. Jijabai
7. Mahalsabai Jadhav

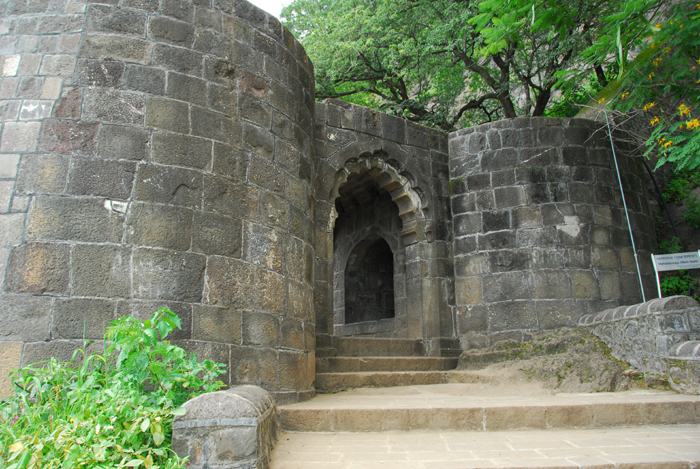
Shivneri Fort

== Conflict with Bijapur Sultanate ==
=== Background and context ===
In 1636, the Sultanate of Bijapur invaded the kingdoms to its south. The sultanate had recently become a tributary state of the Mughal Empire. It was being helped by Shahaji, who at the time was a chieftain in the Maratha uplands of western India. Shahaji was looking for opportunities of rewards of jagir land in the conquered territories, the taxes on which he could collect as an annuity.

Shahaji was a rebel from brief Mughal service. Shahaji's campaigns against the Mughals, supported by the Bijapur government, were generally unsuccessful. He was constantly pursued by the Mughal army, and Shivaji and his mother Jijabai had to move from fort to fort.

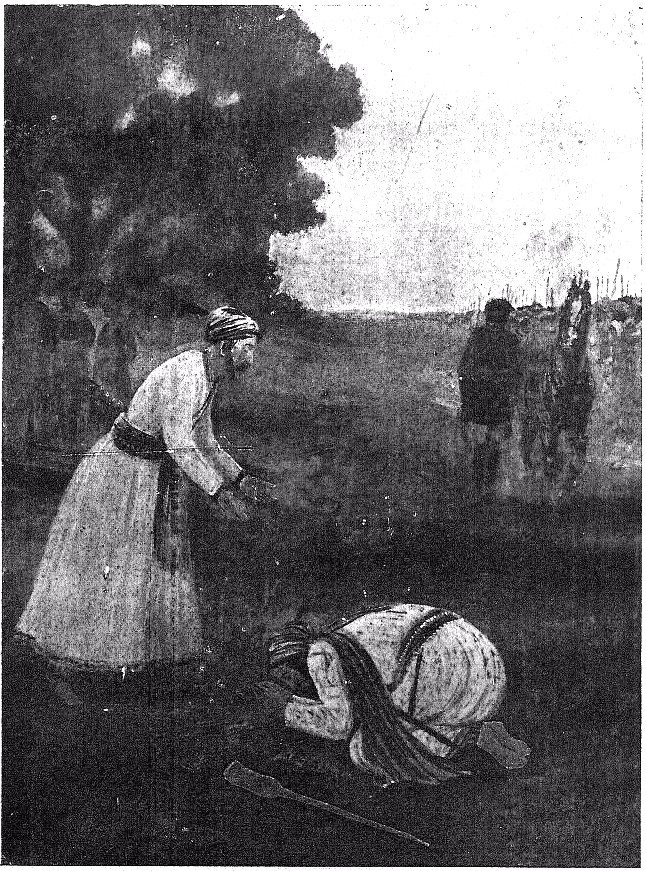
Young Shivaji (right) meets his father Shahaji (left)

In 1636, Shahaji joined the service of Bijapur and obtained Poona as a grant. Shahaji, being deployed in Bangalore by the Bijapuri ruler Adilshah, appointed Dadoji Kondadeo as Poona's administrator. Shivaji and Jijabai settled in Poona. Kondadeo died in 1647 and Shivaji took over its administration.

=== Independent generalship ===
In 1647, the 16-year-old Shivaji captured the Torna Fort through stratagem or bribery, taking advantage of the confusion prevailing in the Bijapur court due to the illness of Sultan Mohammed Adil Shah, and seized the large treasure he found there. In the following two years, Shivaji took several important forts near Pune, including Purandar, Kondhana, and Chakan. He also brought areas east of Pune around Supa, Baramati, and Indapur under his direct control. He used the treasure found at Torna to build a new fort named Rajgad. This fort served as the seat of his government for over a decade. After this, Shivaji turned west to the Konkan and took possession of the important town of Kalyan. The Bijapur government took note of these happenings and sought to take action. On 25 July 1648, Shahaji was imprisoned by a fellow Maratha sardar called Baji Ghorpade, under the orders of the Bijapur government, in a bid to contain Shivaji.

Map of Southern India c. 1605

Shahaji was released in 1649, after the capture of Jinji secured the Adilshahi position in Karnataka. During 1649–1655, Shivaji paused his conquests and quietly consolidated his gains. Following his father's release, Shivaji resumed raiding, and in 1656, under controversial circumstances, killed Chandrarao More, a fellow Maratha feudatory of Bijapur, and seized the valley of Javali, near the present-day hill station of Mahabaleshwar. The conquest of Javali allowed Shivaji to extend his raids into south and southwest Maharashtra. In addition to the Bhonsle and the More families, many others—including Sawant of Sawantwadi, Ghorpade of Mudhol, Nimbalkar of Phaltan, Shirke, Gharge of Nimsod, Mane, and Mohite—also served Adilshahi of Bijapur, many with Deshmukhi rights. Shivaji adopted different strategies to subdue these powerful families, such as forming marital alliances, dealing directly with village Patils (chiefs) to bypass the Deshmukhs, or subduing them by force. Shahaji in his later years had an ambivalent attitude toward his son, and disavowed his rebellious activities. He told the Bijapuris to do whatever they wanted with Shivaji. Shahaji died around 1664–1665 in a hunting accident.

=== Combat with Afzal Khan ===
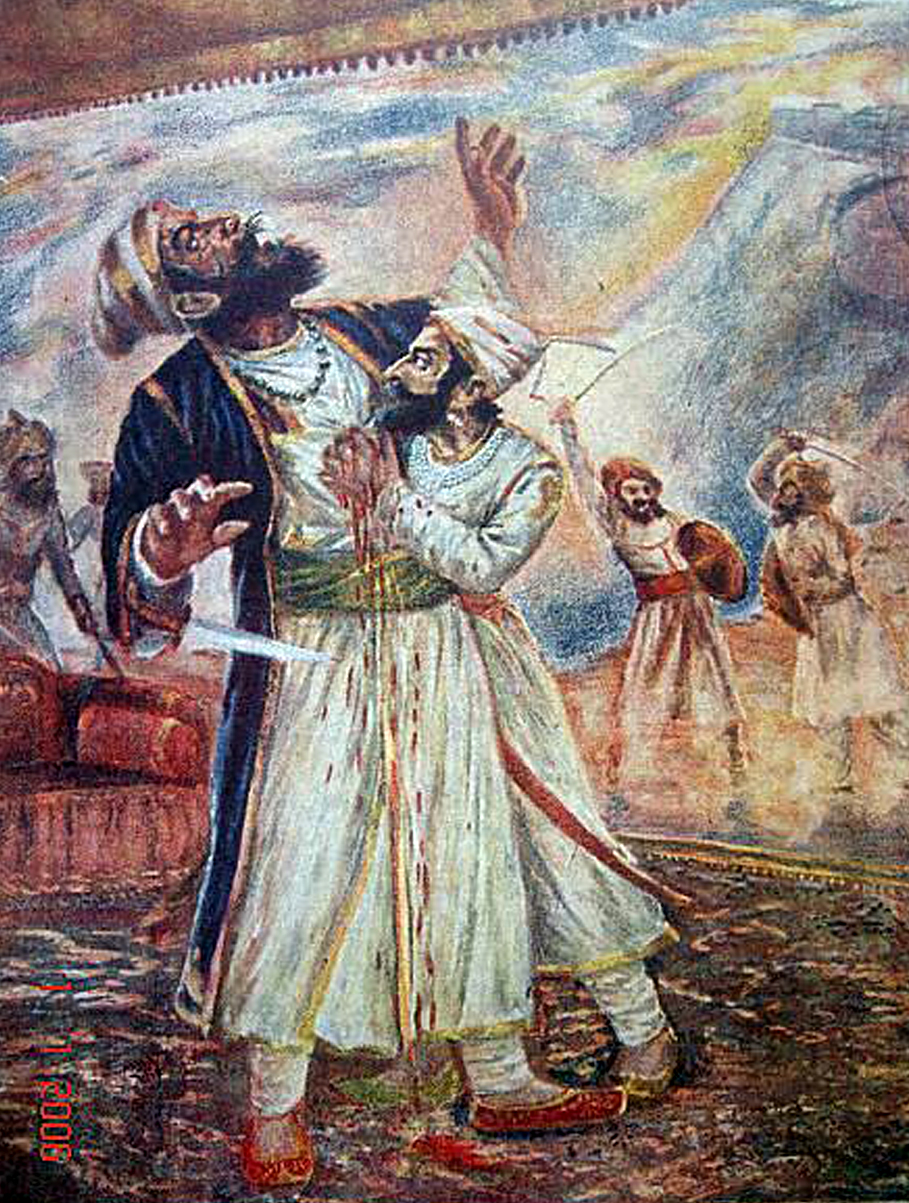
An early-20th-century painting by Sawlaram Haldankar of Shivaji fighting the Bijapuri general Afzal Khan

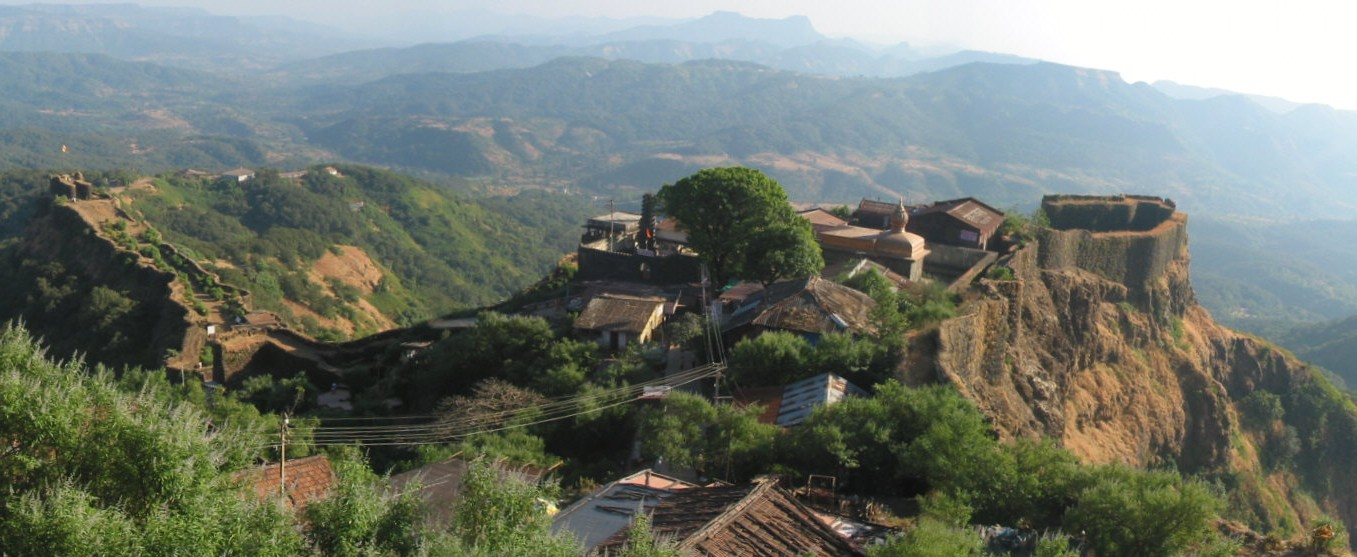
Pratapgad fort

The Bijapur Sultanate was displeased with their losses to Shivaji's forces, with their vassal Shahaji disavowing his son's actions. After a peace treaty with the Mughals, and the general acceptance of the young Ali Adil Shah II as the sultan, the Bijapur government became more stable, and turned its attention towards Shivaji. In 1657, the sultan, or more likely his mother and regent, sent Afzal Khan, a veteran general, to arrest Shivaji. Before engaging him, the Bijapuri forces desecrated the Tulja Bhavani Temple, a holy site for Shivaji's family, and the Vithoba temple at Pandharpur, a major pilgrimage site for Hindus.

Pursued by Bijapuri forces, Shivaji retreated to Pratapgad fort, where many of his colleagues pressed him to surrender. The two forces found themselves at a stalemate, with Shivaji unable to break the siege, while Afzal Khan, having a powerful cavalry but lacking siege equipment, was unable to take the fort. After two months, Afzal Khan sent an envoy to Shivaji suggesting the two leaders meet in private, outside the fort, for negotiations.

The two met in a hut at the foothills of Pratapgad fort on 10 November 1659. The arrangements had dictated each come armed only with a sword, and attended by one follower. Shivaji, suspecting Afzal Khan would arrest or attack him, (Note: A decade earlier, Afzal Khan, in a parallel situation, had arrested a Hindu general during a truce ceremony.) wore armour beneath his clothes, concealed a bagh nakh (metal "tiger claw") on his left arm, and had a dagger in his right hand. What transpired is not known with historical certainty, as mainly Maratha legends tell the tale; however, it is agreed the two wound up in a physical struggle that proved fatal for Khan. (Note: Jadunath Sarkar after weighing all recorded evidence in this behalf, has settled the point "that Afzal Khan struck the first blow" and that "Shivaji committed.... a preventive murder. It was a case of a diamond cut diamond." The conflict between Shivaji and Bijapur was essentially political in nature, and not communal.) Khan's dagger failed to pierce Shivaji's armour, but Shivaji disembowelled him; Shivaji then fired a cannon to signal his hidden troops to attack the Bijapuri army.

In the ensuing Battle of Pratapgarh, Shivaji's forces decisively defeated the Bijapur Sultanate's forces. More than 3,000 soldiers of the Bijapur army were killed; and one sardar of high rank, two sons of Afzal Khan, and two Maratha chiefs were taken prisoner. After the victory, a grand review was held by Shivaji below Pratapgarh. The captured enemy, both officers and soldiers, were set free and sent back to their homes with money, food, and other gifts. The Maratha troops were rewarded accordingly.

=== Siege of Panhala ===
Having defeated the Bijapuri forces sent against him, Shivaji and his army marched towards the Konkan coast and Kolhapur, seizing Panhala fort, and defeating Bijapuri forces sent against them, under Rustam Zaman and Fazl Khan, in 1659. In 1660, Adilshah sent his general Siddi Jauhar (a Siddi leader of the Konkan coast) to attack Shivaji's southern border, in alliance with the Mughals who planned to attack from the north. At that time, Shivaji was encamped at Panhala fort with his forces. Siddi Jauhar's army besieged Panhala in mid-1660, cutting off supply routes to the fort. During the bombardment of Panhala, Siddi Jauhar purchased grenades from the English East India Company (EIC) factory at Rajapur. He also hired several English artillerymen to assist in his bombardment of the fort, conspicuously flying the flag of the East India Company. This perceived betrayal angered Shivaji, who in retaliation plundered the factory in December and detained four of its employees, imprisoning them until mid-1663.

After months of siege, Shivaji negotiated with Siddi Jauhar and handed over the fort on 22 September 1660, withdrawing to Vishalgad; Shivaji retook Panhala in 1673.

=== Battle of Pavan Khind ===
Shivaji escaped from Panhala by cover of night, and as he was pursued by the enemy cavalry, his Maratha sardar Baji Prabhu Deshpande of Bandal Deshmukh, along with 300 soldiers, volunteered to fight to the death to hold back the enemy at Ghod Khind ("horse ravine", khind meaning "a narrow mountain pass") to give Shivaji and the rest of the army a chance to reach the safety of Vishalgad fort.

In the ensuing battle of Pavan Khind, the smaller Maratha force held back the larger enemy to buy time for Shivaji to escape. Baji Prabhu Deshpande was wounded but continued to fight until he heard the sound of cannon fire from Vishalgad, signalling Shivaji had safely reached the fort, on the evening of 22 September 1660. Ghod Khind was later renamed Pavan Khind ("sacred pass") in honour of Baji Prabhu Deshpande, Shibosingh Jadhav, Fuloji, and all other soldiers who fought there.

== Conflict with the Mughals ==
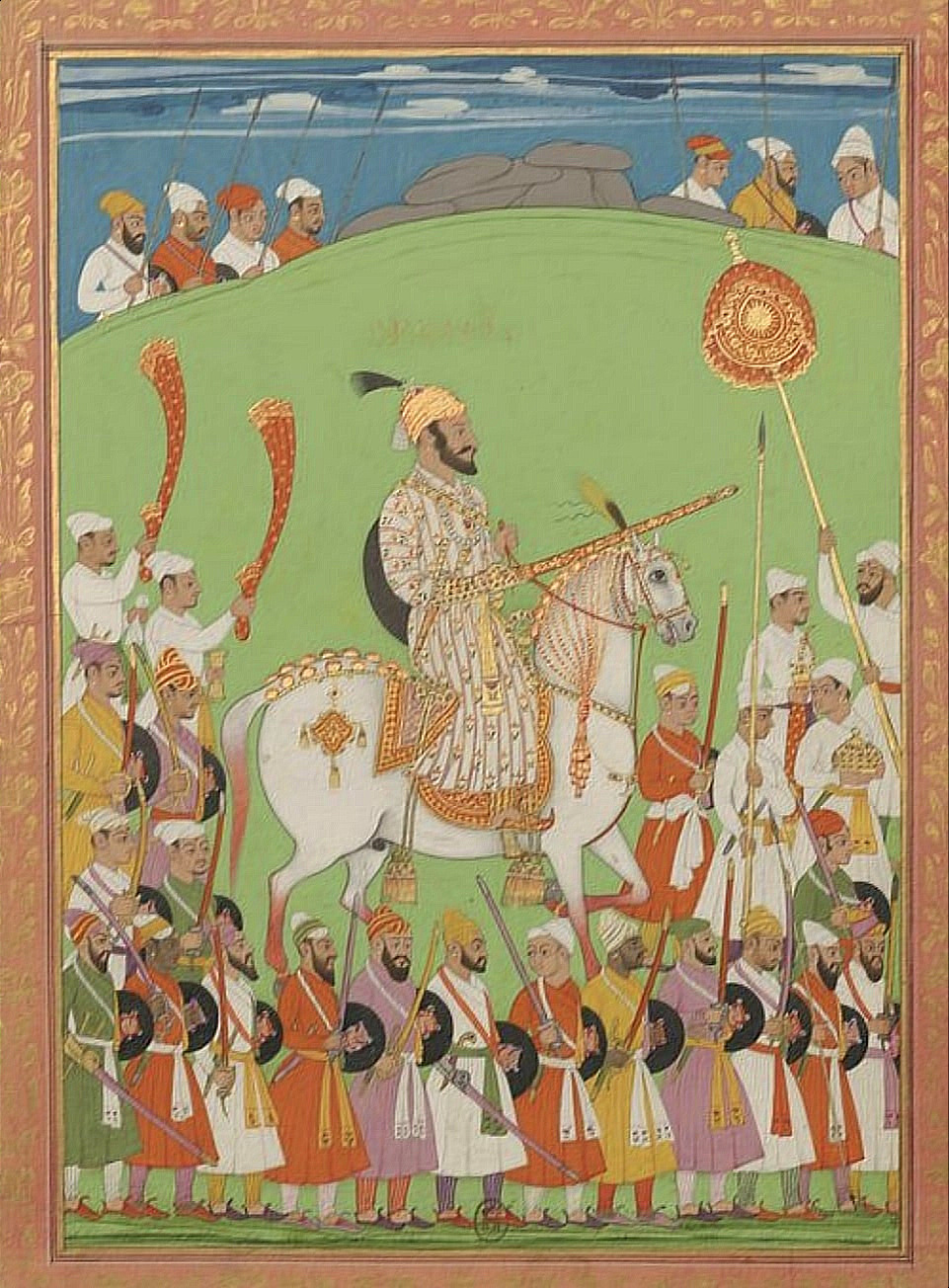
Shivaji with his personal guards by Mir Muhammad c. 1672

Until 1657, Shivaji maintained peaceful relations with the Mughal Empire. Shivaji offered his assistance to Aurangzeb, the son of the Mughal Emperor and viceroy of the Deccan, in conquering Bijapur, in return for formal recognition of his right to the Bijapuri forts and villages in his possession. Dissatisfied with the Mughal response, and receiving a better offer from Bijapur, he launched a raid into the Mughal Deccan. Shivaji's confrontations with the Mughals began in March 1657, when two of Shivaji's officers raided Mughal territory near Ahmednagar. This was followed by raids in Junnar, with Shivaji carrying off 300,000 hun in cash and 200 horses. Aurangzeb responded to the raids by sending Nasiri Khan, who defeated the forces of Shivaji at Ahmednagar. However, Aurangzeb's countermeasures against Shivaji were interrupted by the rainy season and his battles with his brothers over the succession to the Mughal throne, following the illness of the emperor Shah Jahan.

=== Attacks on Shaista Khan and Surat ===
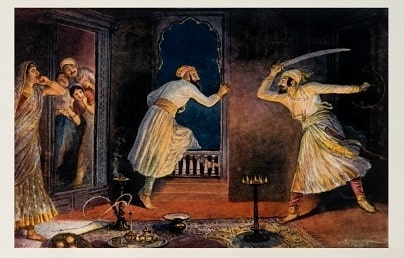
A 20th century depiction of Shivaji's surprise attack on Mughal general Shaista Khan in Pune by M. V. Dhurandhar

At the request of Badi Begum of Bijapur, Aurangzeb, now the Mughal emperor, sent his maternal uncle Shaista Khan, with an army numbering over 150,000, along with a powerful artillery division, in January 1660 to attack Shivaji in conjunction with Bijapur's army led by Siddi Jauhar. Shaista Khan, with his better equipped and well provisioned army of 80,000 seized Pune. He also took the nearby fort of Chakan, besieging it for a month and a half before breaching the walls. He established his residence at Shivaji's palace of Lal Mahal.

On the night of 5 April 1663, Shivaji led a daring night attack on Shaista Khan's camp. He, along with 400 men, attacked Shaista Khan's mansion, broke into Khan's bedroom and wounded him. Khan lost three fingers. In the scuffle, Shaista Khan's son and several wives, servants, and soldiers were killed. Khan took refuge with the Mughal forces outside Pune, and Aurangzeb punished him for this embarrassment with a transfer to Bengal.

In retaliation for Shaista Khan's attacks, and to replenish his now-depleted treasury, in 1664 Shivaji sacked the port city of Surat, a wealthy Mughal trading centre and decamped with plunder exceeding Rs 10 million. On 13 February 1665, he also conducted a naval raid on Portuguese-held Basrur in present-day Karnataka, and gained a large plunder.

=== Treaty of Purandar ===
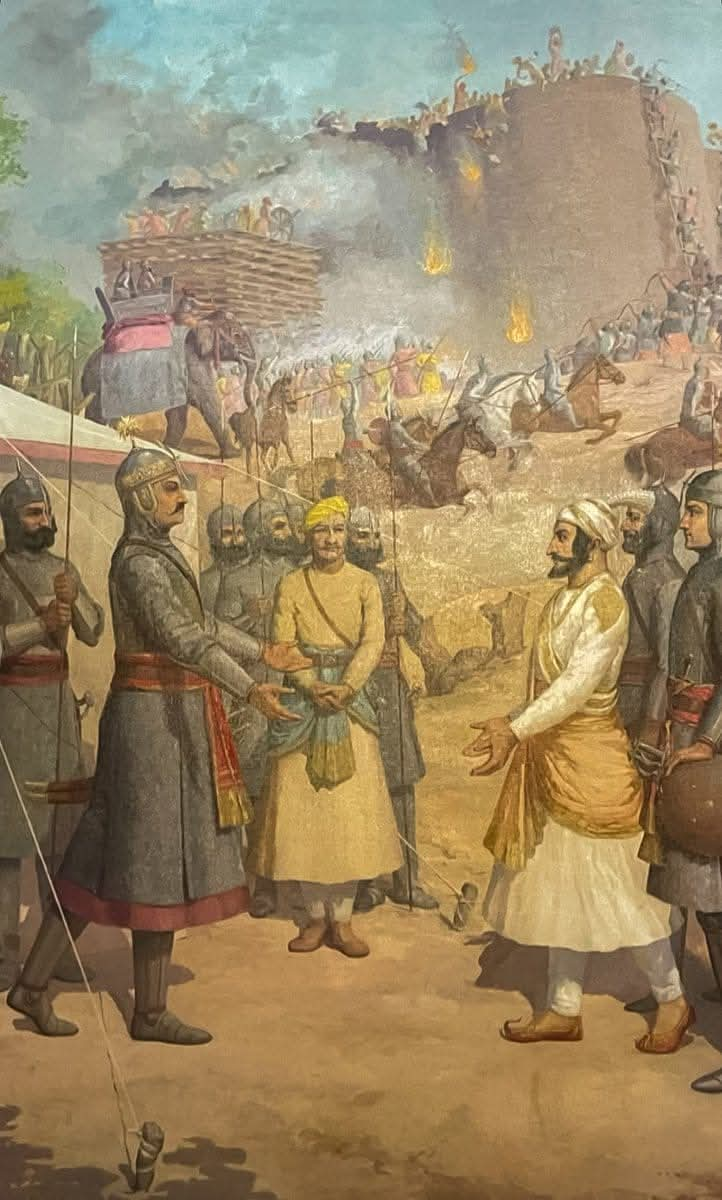
Shivaji submits to Jai Singh

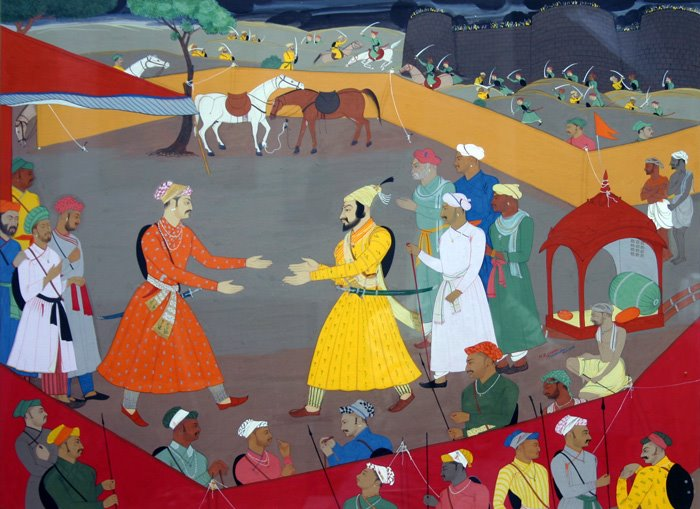
Raja Jai Singh of Amber receiving Shivaji a day before concluding the Treaty of Purandar

The attacks on Shaista Khan and Surat enraged Aurangzeb. In response, he sent the Rajput general Jai Singh I with an army numbering around 15,000 to defeat Shivaji. Throughout 1665, Jai Singh's forces pressed Shivaji, with their cavalry razing the countryside, and besieging Shivaji's forts. The Mughal commander succeeded in luring away several of Shivaji's key commanders, and many of his cavalrymen, into Mughal service. By mid-1665, with the fortress at Purandar besieged and near capture, Shivaji was forced to come to terms with Jai Singh. Shivaji is noted to have said when receiving Jai Singh:

"I have come as a guilty slave to seek forgiveness, and it is for you either to pardon or to kill me at your pleasure. I will make over my great forts, with the country of Konkan, to the Emperor's officers, and I will send you my son to enter the imperial service. As for myself, I hope that after the interval of one year, when I have paid my respects to the Emperor, I may be allowed, like other servants of the State who exercise authority in their own provinces, to live with my wife and family in a small fort or two. Whenever and wherever my services are required. I will on receiving orders, discharge my duty loyally."

In the Treaty of Purandar, signed by Shivaji and Jai Singh on 11 June 1665, Shivaji agreed to give up 23 of his forts, keeping 12 for himself, and pay compensation of 400,000 gold hun to the Mughals. Shivaji agreed to become a vassal of the Mughal empire, and to send his son Sambhaji, along with 5,000 horsemen, to fight for the Mughals in the Deccan, as a mansabdar. In January 1666, Shivaji was dispatched to capture the fort of Panhala and Phonda from Bijapur. He led the unsuccessful siege on the fort of Ponda and Panhala. In March 1666, Shivaji went to the Mughal court.

Sambhaji was taken as a political prisoner to ensure compliance with the treaty. Shivaji himself wished to be excused from attending the court. To this end, he wrote letters to Aurangzeb, requesting forgiveness for his actions and security for himself along with a robe of honour. He also requested Jai Singh to support him in getting his crimes pardoned by the emperor, stating "Now you are protector and a father to me, so I beg you to fulfil the ambition of your son." On 15 September 1665, Aurangzeb granted his request and sent him a letter and a firman along with a robe of honor. Shivaji responded with a letter thanking the emperor:

Shiva, the meanest of life-devoting slaves who wears the ring of servitude in his ear and the carpet of obedience on his shoulder—like an atom ... [acknowledges] the goodnews of his eternal happiness, namely favours from the Emperor ... This sinner and evil-doer did not deserve that his offences should be forgiven or his faults covered up. But the grace and favour of the Emperor have conferred on him a new life and unimaginable honour ...

=== Arrest in Agra and escape ===
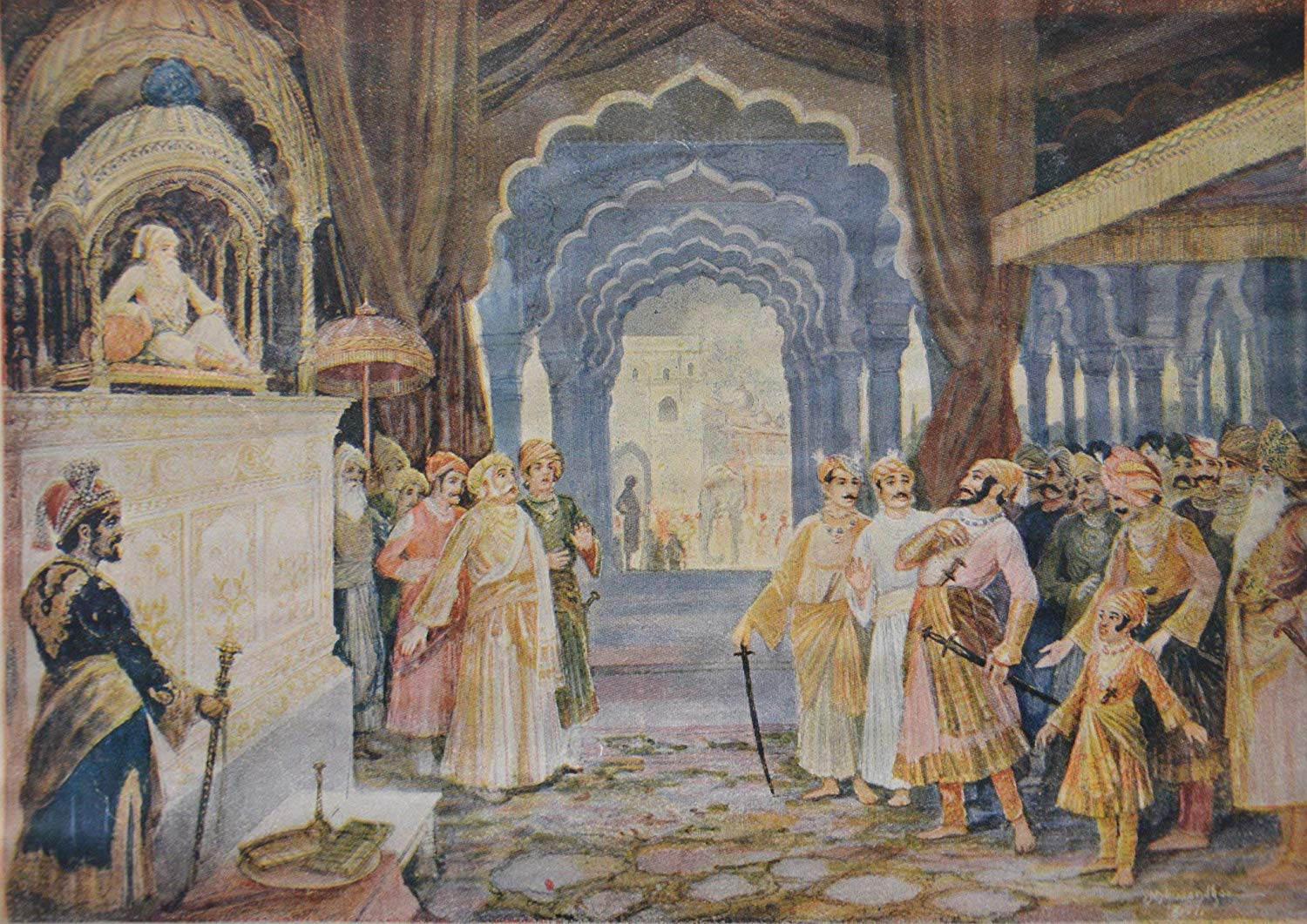
20th century depiction by M. V. Dhurandhar of Raja Shivaji at the court of Mughal Badshah Aurangzeb.

In 1666, Aurangzeb summoned Shivaji to Agra (though some sources instead state Delhi), along with his nine-year-old son Sambhaji. Aurangzeb planned to send Shivaji to Kandahar, now in Afghanistan, to consolidate the Mughal empire's northwestern frontier. However, on 12 May 1666, Shivaji was made to stand at court alongside relatively low-ranking nobles, men he had already defeated in battle. Shivaji took offence, stormed out, and was promptly placed under house arrest. Ram Singh, son of Jai Singh, guaranteed custody of Shivaji and his son. The emperor also withheld the previous honors bestowed upon him such as his robe of honour, elephant and jewels.

Shivaji's position under house arrest was perilous, as Aurangzeb's court debated whether to kill him or continue employing him. Jai Singh, having assured Shivaji of his personal safety, tried to influence Aurangzeb's decision. While Shivaji regarded himself as a king, in the eyes of the Mughal emperor, he was only a relatively successful rebel zamindar.

By the time the order for his posting to Kabul arrived, a rumor had already spread at the court that Shivaji would be killed along the way. However, the order was canceled when Shivaji refused to go. During the negotiations that followed, Shivaji demanded the transfer of his forts before becoming a Mansabdar, a demand the emperor rejected. The orders to kill him were prevented only by Jai Singh's intervention. In the end, Shivaji's request to leave for Banaras as a Sannyasi was also rejected.

Meanwhile, Shivaji hatched a plan to free himself. He sent most of his men back home and asked Ram Singh to withdraw his guarantees to the emperor for the safe custody of himself and his son. He surrendered to Mughal forces. Shivaji then pretended to be ill and began sending out large baskets packed with sweets to be given to the Brahmins and poor as penance. On 17 August 1666, by putting himself in one of the baskets and his son Sambhaji in another, Shivaji escaped and left Agra. Stewart N. Gordon opines that there is no contemporary evidence to support this story. He also states that, despite Aurangzeb's suspicions regarding Ram Singh's involvement in Shivaji's escape, nothing was proven and Shivaji likely bribed the guards to facilitate his escape.

=== Peace with the Mughals ===
After Shivaji's escape, hostilities with the Mughals ebbed, with the Mughal Sardar Jaswant Singh acting as an intermediary between Shivaji and Aurangzeb for new peace proposals. Between 1666 and 1668, Aurangzeb also conferred the title of Raja on Shivaji, although he did not restore his right over the forts. Sambhaji was also restored as a Mughal mansabdar with 5,000 horses. At this time Shivaji sent Sambhaji and General Prataprao Gujar to serve with Prince Mu'azzam, the Mughal viceroy in Aurangabad. Sambhaji was also granted territory in Berar for revenue collection. Aurangzeb also permitted Shivaji to attack Bijapur, ruled by the decaying Adil Shahi dynasty; the weakened Sultan Ali Adil Shah II sued for peace and granted the rights of sardeshmukhi and chauthai to Shivaji.

== Resumption of hostilities ==
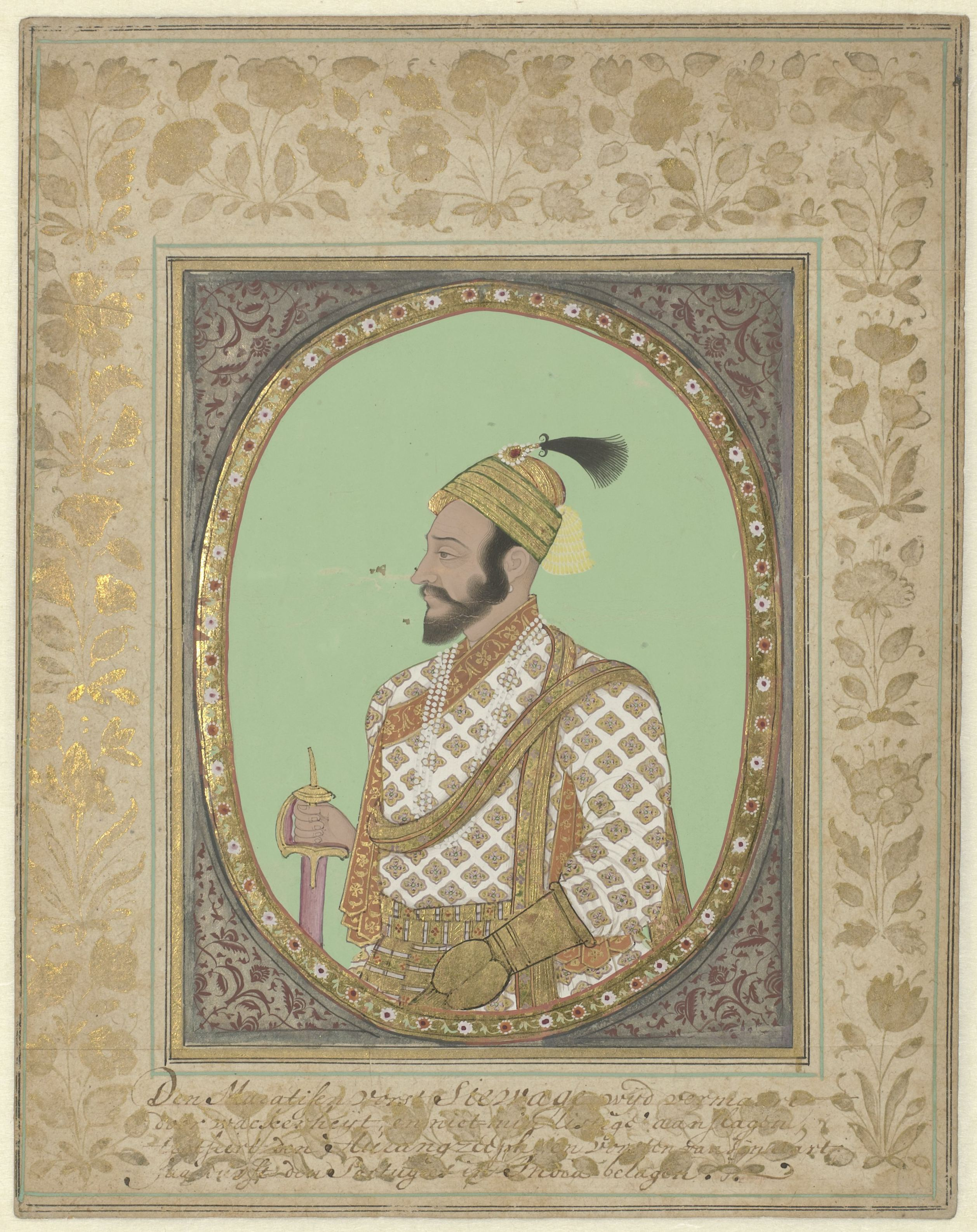
Indian miniature depicting Shivaji c. 1680

The peace between Shivaji and the Mughals lasted until 1670, after which Aurangzeb became suspicious of the close ties between Shivaji and Mu'azzam, who he thought might usurp his throne, and might even have been receiving bribes from Shivaji. At that time, Aurangzeb, who was occupied in fighting the Afghans, greatly reduced his army in the Deccan; many of the disbanded soldiers quickly joined Maratha service. The Mughals also took away the jagir of Berar from Sambhaji to recover the money lent a few years earlier for his father's trip to Agra. In response, Shivaji launched an offensive against the Mughals and in a span of four months recovered a major portion of the territories that were surrendered to them.

Shivaji sacked Surat for a second time in 1670; the English and Dutch factories were able to repel his attack, but he managed to sack the city itself, including plundering the goods of a Muslim prince from Mawara-un-Nahr, who was returning from Mecca. Angered by the renewed attacks, the Mughals sent a force under Daud Khan to intercept Shivaji on his return home from Surat; they clashed in the Battle of Vani-Dindori near present-day Nashik and Shivaji and the Maratha force emerged victorious.

In October 1670, Shivaji sent his forces to harass the English at Bombay; as they had refused to sell him war materiel, his forces blocked English woodcutting parties from leaving Bombay. In September 1671, Shivaji sent an ambassador to Bombay, again seeking materiel, this time for the fight against Danda-Rajpuri. The English had misgivings of the advantages Shivaji would gain from this conquest, but also did not want to lose any chance of receiving compensation for him looting their factories at Rajapur. The English sent Lieutenant Stephen Ustick to meet with Shivaji, but negotiations failed over the issue of the Rajapur indemnity. Numerous exchanges of envoys followed over the coming years, with some agreement as to the arms issues in 1674, but Shivaji was never to pay the Rajapur indemnity before his death, and the factory there dissolved at the end of 1682.

=== Battles of Umrani and Nesari ===
In 1674, Prataprao Gujar, the sarnaubat (commander-in-chief of the Maratha forces), and Anandrao were sent to push back the invading Bijapuri force led by General Bahlol Khan. Prataprao's forces defeated and captured Bahol Khan in battle, after cutting-off their water supply by encircling a strategic lake, which prompted Bahlol Khan to sue for peace. In spite of Shivaji's specific warnings against doing so, Prataprao released Bahlol Khan, who started preparing for a fresh invasion.

Shivaji sent a letter to Prataprao, expressing his displeasure and refusing him an audience until Bahlol Khan was re-captured. Upset by this rebuke, Prataprao found Bahlol Khan and charged his position with only six other horsemen, leaving his main force behind, and was killed in combat. Shivaji was deeply grieved on hearing of Prataprao's death, and arranged for the marriage of his second son, Rajaram, to Prataprao's daughter. Prataprao was succeeded by Hambirrao Mohite as the new sarnaubat. At this time, Raigad Fort was newly built by Hiroji Indulkar, as the capital of the nascent Maratha kingdom.

== Coronation ==
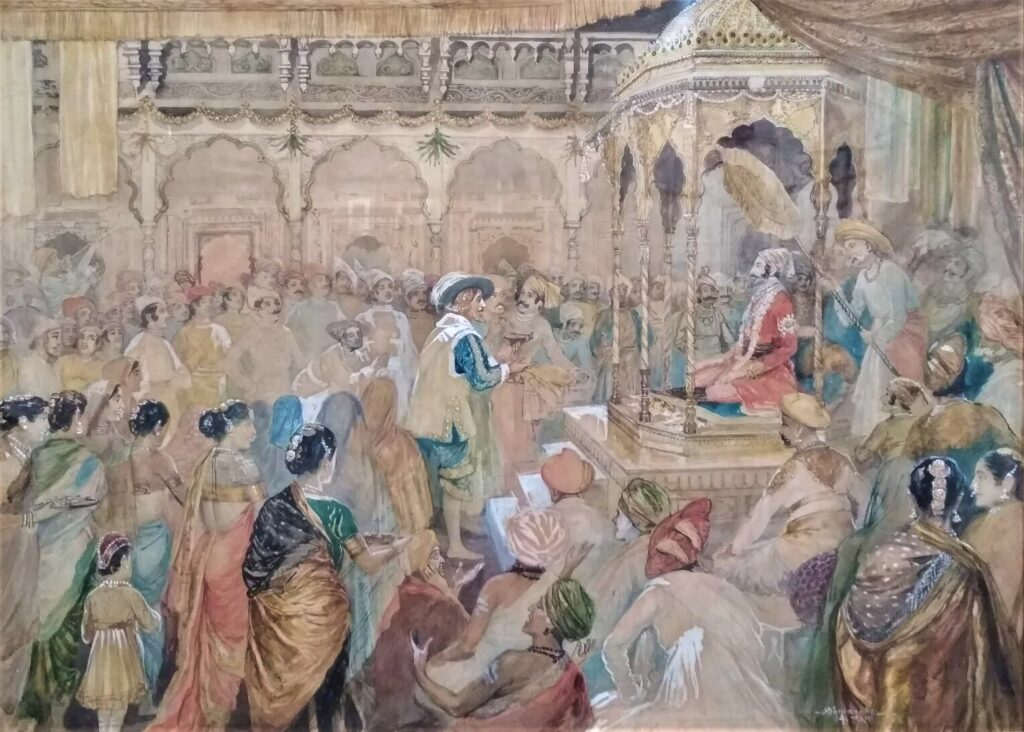
20th century depiction of the Coronation Durbar with over 100 characters depicted in attendance by M. V. Dhurandhar

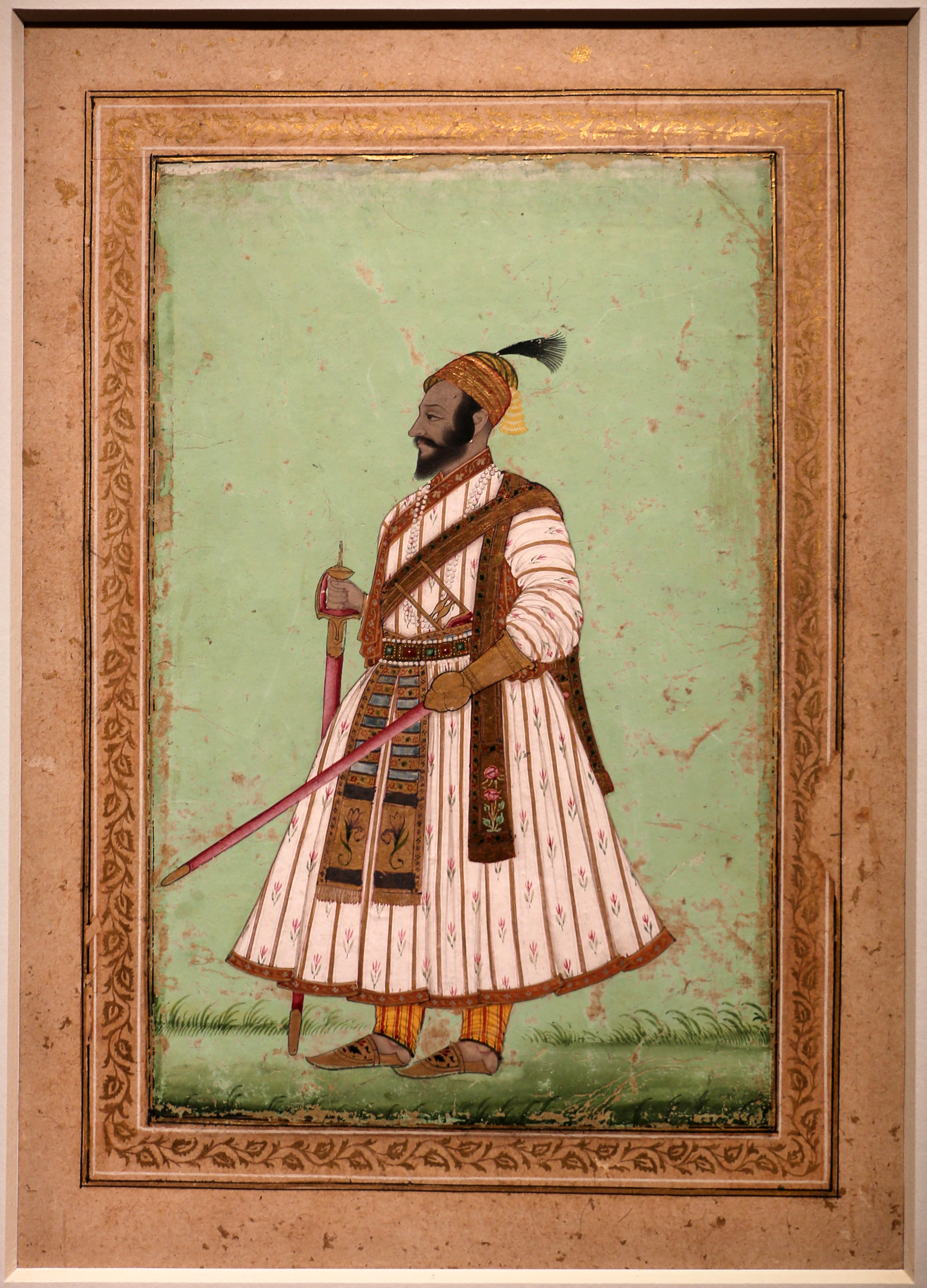
Portrait of Shivaji I c. 1675

Shivaji had acquired extensive lands and wealth through his campaigns, but lacked a formal title, he was still technically a Mughal Zamindar (feudal lord) or the son of a Bijapuri Jagirdar (vassal), with no legal basis to rule his de facto domain. He sought a kingly title which could address this and also prevent challenges by other Maratha leaders, who were his equals. (Note: Most of the Maratha Jahagirdar families in the service of Adilshahi strongly opposed Shivaji in his early years. These included families such as the Ghadge, More, Mohite, Ghorpade, Shirke, and Nimbalkar.) A title would also provide the Hindu Marathis with a Hindu sovereign in a region otherwise ruled by Muslims.

The preparation for a proposed coronation began in 1673. However, some controversies delayed the coronation by almost a year. One controversy erupted amongst the Brahmins of Shivaji's court: they refused to crown Shivaji as a king because that status was reserved for those of the Kshatriya Varna (warrior class) in Hindu society. Shivaji was descended from a line of headmen of farming villages, and the Brahmins accordingly categorized him as a Maratha, not a Kshatriya. They noted Shivaji had never had a sacred thread ceremony, and did not wear the thread, such as a kshatriya would. When Shivaji came to know about this conspiracy, he later bribed and summoned Gaga Bhatt, a pandit of Varanasi, who stated that he had found a genealogy proving Shivaji was descended from the Sisodias, and thus indeed a Kshatriya, albeit one who had not had the required ceremonies. To enforce this status, Shivaji was given a sacred thread ceremony, and remarried his spouses under the Vedic rites expected of a Kshatriya. However, according to historical evidence, Shivaji's claim of Rajput descent, and specifically of Sisodia ancestry, may be seen as tenuous at best, or even being purely invented.

On 28 May, Shivaji did penance for his and his ancestors' not observing Kshatriya rites for so long. Then he was invested by Gaga Bhatt with the sacred thread. On the insistence of other Brahmins, Gaga Bhatt omitted the Vedic chant and initiated Shivaji into a modified form of the life of the twice-born, instead of putting him on par with the Brahmins. The next day, Shivaji made atonement for the sins, deliberate or accidental, committed in his own lifetime. He was weighed separately against seven metals including gold, silver, and several other articles such as fine linen, camphor, salt, sugar etc. All these articles, along with a lakh (one hundred thousand) of hun, were distributed among the Brahmins. According to Sarkar, even this failed to satisfy the greed of the Brahmins. Two of the learned Brahmins pointed out Shivaji, while conducting his raids, had killed Brahmins, cows, women, and children. He could be cleansed of these sins for a price of Rs. 8,000, which Shivaji paid. The total expenditure for feeding the assemblage, general almsgiving, throne, and ornaments approached 1.5 million rupees.

On 6 June 1674, Shivaji was crowned king of the Maratha Empire (Hindavi Swaraj) in a lavish ceremony at Raigad fort. In the Hindu calendar it was the 13th day (trayodashi) of the first fortnight of the month of Jyeshtha in the year 1596. Gaga Bhatt officiated, pouring water from a gold vessel filled with the waters of the seven sacred rivers—Yamuna, Indus, Ganges, Godavari, Narmada, Krishna, and Kaveri—over Shivaji's head, and chanted the Vedic coronation mantras. After the ablution, Shivaji bowed before his mother, Jijabai, and touched her feet. Nearly fifty thousand people gathered at Raigad for the ceremonies. Shivaji was entitled Shakakarta ("founder of an era"), and Chhatrapati ("Lord of the Umbrella"). He also took the title of Haindava Dharmodhhaarak (protector of the Hindu faith), and Kshatriya Kulavantas: Kshatriya being the varna (Note: Varna is sometimes also termed Varnashrama Dharma) of Hinduism and Kulavantas meaning the 'head of the kula, or clan'.

Shivaji's mother died on 18 June 1674. The Marathas summoned Nischal Puri Goswami, a tantric priest, who declared the original coronation was held under inauspicious stars, and a second coronation was needed. This second coronation, on 24 September 1674, mollified those who still believed Shivaji was not qualified for the Vedic rites of his first coronation, by being a less controversial ceremony.

== Conquest in southern India ==
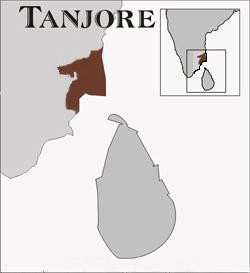
Tanjavur Maratha Kingdom

Beginning in 1674, the Marathas undertook an aggressive campaign, raiding Khandesh (October), capturing the Bijapuri forts of Ponda (April 1675), Karwar (mid-year), and Kolhapur (July). In November, the Maratha navy skirmished with the Siddis of Janjira, but failed to dislodge them. Having recovered from an illness, and taking advantage of a civil war that had broken out between the Deccanis and the Afghans at Bijapur, Shivaji raided Athani in April 1676.

In the run-up to his expedition, Shivaji appealed to a sense of Deccani patriotism, that Southern India was a homeland that should be protected from outsiders. His appeal was somewhat successful, and in 1677 Shivaji visited Hyderabad for a month and entered into a treaty with the Qutubshah of the Golkonda sultanate, who agreed to renounce his alliance with Bijapur and jointly oppose the Mughals.

In 1677, Shivaji invaded Karnataka with 30,000 cavalry and 40,000 infantry, backed by Golkonda artillery and funding. Proceeding south, Shivaji seized the forts of Vellore and Gingee; the latter would later serve as a capital of the Marathas during the reign of his son Rajaram I. This conquest gave him possession of vast territory in the Mysore plateau and Madras Carnatic, containing 100 forts.

In August 1677, Shivaji aided by local disgruntled chieftains, invaded the kingdom ruled by Chikkadevaraja Wodeyar and plundered Srirangapatna. In the battle that followed, Chikkadevaraja subdued Shivaji and adopted the title Apratima Vira meaning "unparalleled hero".

Shivaji intended to reconcile with his half-brother Venkoji (Ekoji I), Shahaji's son by his second wife, Tukabai (née Mohite), who ruled Thanjavur (Tanjore) after Shahaji. The initially promising negotiations were unsuccessful, so whilst returning to Raigad, Shivaji defeated his half-brother's army on 26 November 1677 and seized most of his possessions on the Mysore plateau. Venkoji's wife Dipa Bai, whom Shivaji deeply respected, took up new negotiations with Shivaji and also convinced her husband to distance himself from his Muslim advisors. In the end, Shivaji consented to turn over to her and her female descendants many of the properties he had seized, with Venkoji consenting to a number of conditions for the proper administration of the territories and maintenance of Shahji's tomb (samadhi).

== Death and succession ==
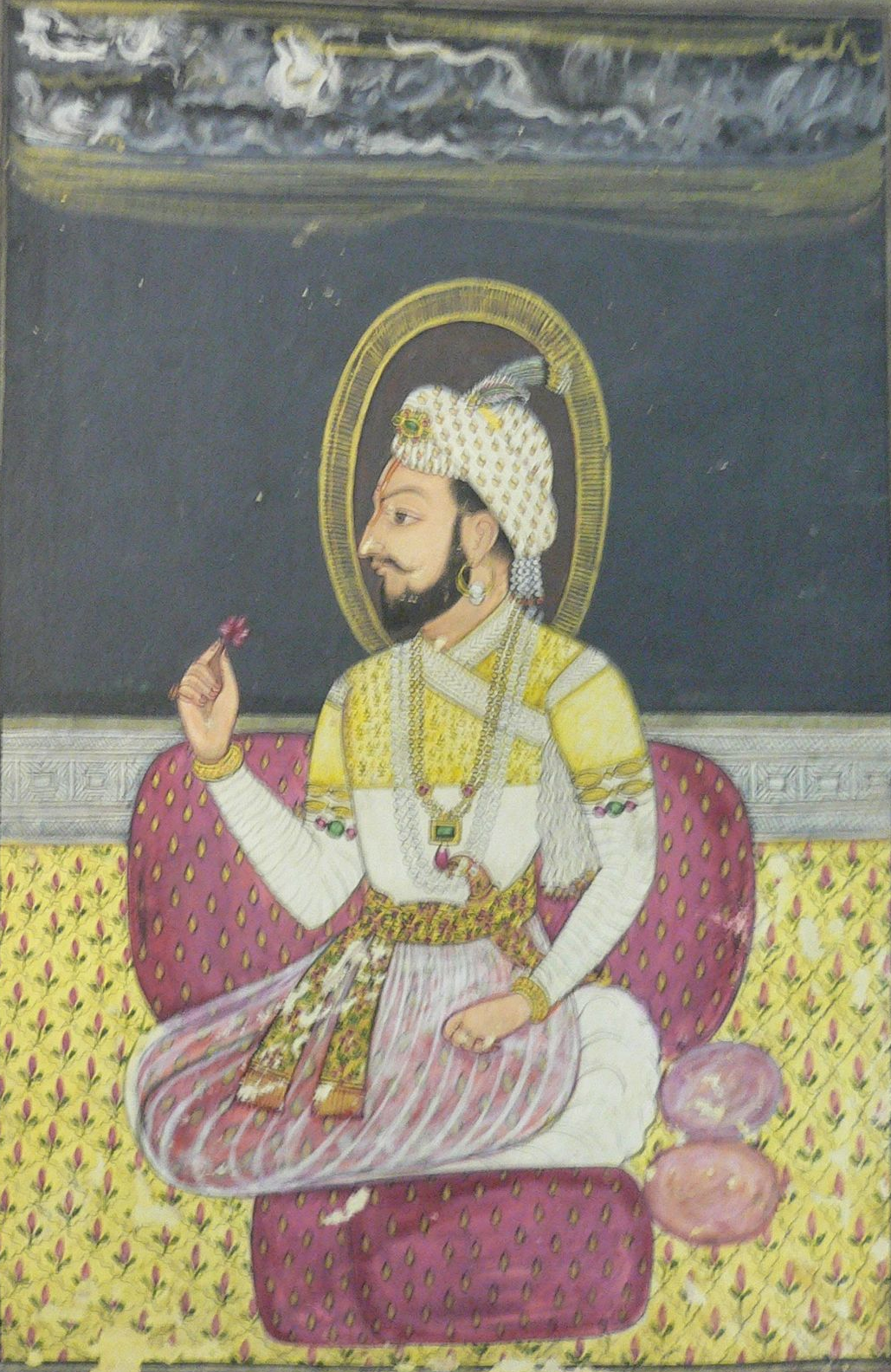
Sambhaji, Shivaji's elder son who succeeded him

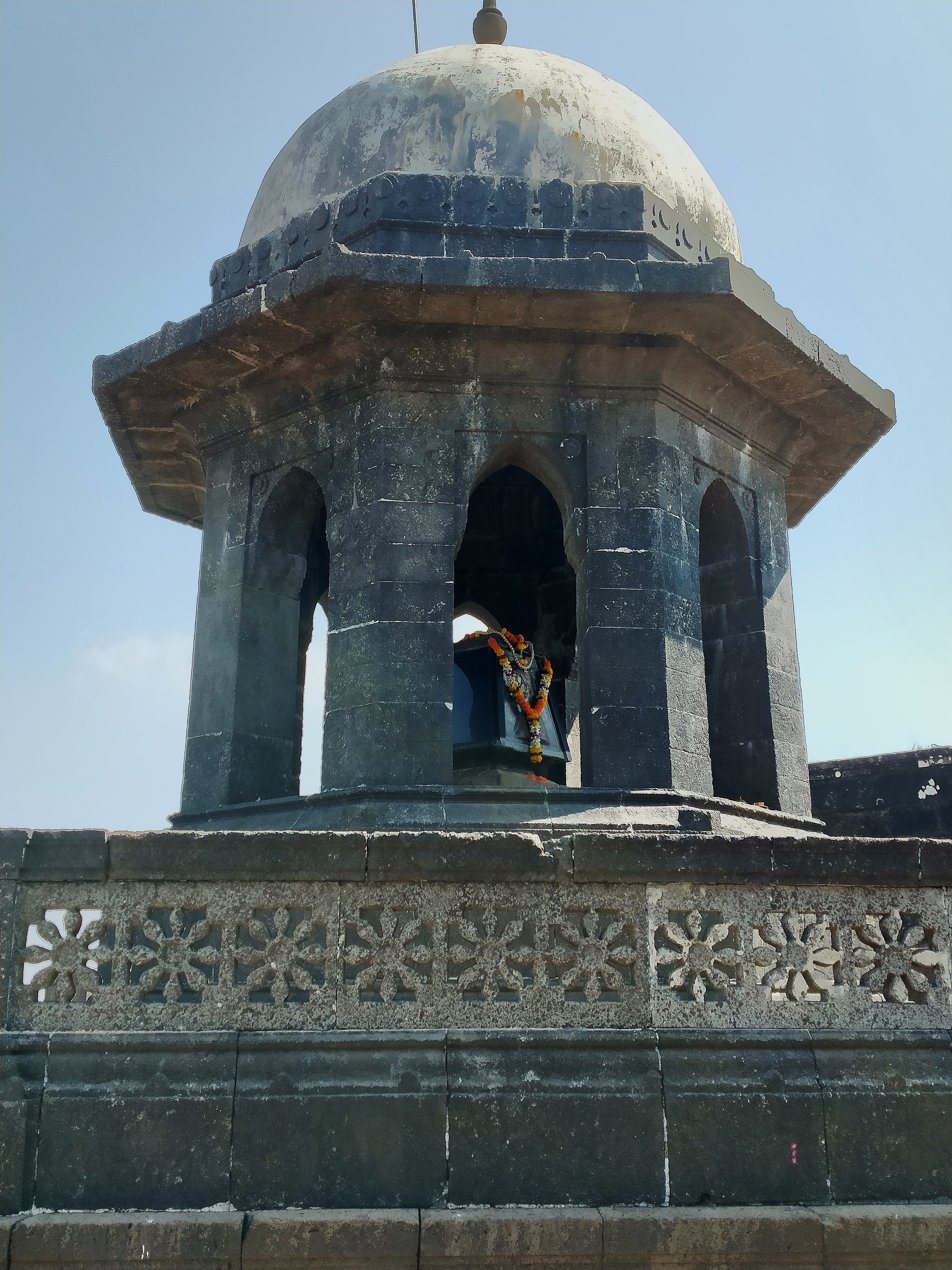
Samadhi of Shivaji-I (Memorial)

The question of Shivaji's heir-apparent was complicated. In 1678, Shivaji confined his son Sambhaji to Panhala Fort for having an addiction to sensual pleasures or violating a Brahmin woman. However, the prince escaped with his wife and defected to the Mughals where he fought against Shivaji in the Battle of Bhupalgarh. Upon returning home, unrepentant, he was again confined to Panhala Fort.

In late March 1680, Shivaji fell ill with fever and dysentery, dying around 3–5 April 1680 at the age of 50, at Raigad Fort, on the eve of Hanuman Jayanti. The cause of Shivaji's death is disputed. British records state Shivaji died of bloody flux, after being sick for 12 days. (Note: As for the cause of his death, the Bombay Council's letter dated 28 April 1680 says: "We have certain news that Shivaji Rajah is dead. It is now 23 days since he deceased, it is said of a bloody flux, being sick 12 days." A contemporaneous Portuguese document states that Shivaji died of anthrax. However, none of these sources provides sufficient details to draw a definite conclusion. The Sabhasad Chronicle states that the King died of fever, while some versions of the A.K. Chronicle state that he died of "navjvar" (possibly typhoid).) In a contemporary work in Portuguese, in the Biblioteca Nacional de Lisboa, the recorded cause of death of Shivaji is anthrax. However, Krishnaji Anant Sabhasad, author of the Sabhasad Bakhar, a biography of Shivaji has mentioned fever as the cause of death. Putalabai, the childless eldest of the surviving wives of Shivaji committed sati by jumping into his funeral pyre. Another surviving spouse, Sakwarbai, was not allowed to follow suit because she had a young daughter. There were also allegations, though doubted by later scholars, that his second wife Soyarabai had poisoned him in order to put her 10-year-old son Rajaram on the throne.

After Shivaji's death, Soyarabai made plans, with various ministers, to crown her son Rajaram rather than her stepson Sambhaji. On 21 April 1680, ten-year-old Rajaram was installed on the throne. However, Sambhaji took possession of Raigad Fort after killing the commander, and on 18 June acquired control of Raigad, and formally ascended the throne on 20 July. Rajaram, his mother Soyarabai and wife Janki Bai were imprisoned, and Soyrabai was executed on charges of conspiracy that October.

== Governance ==
=== Ashta Pradhan Mandal ===
The Council of Eight Ministers, or Ashta Pradhan Mandal, was an administrative and advisory council set up by Shivaji. It consisted of eight ministers who regularly advised Shivaji on political and administrative matters. The eight ministers were as follows:

Ashta Pradhan Mandal
Minister	Duty
Peshwa or Prime Minister	General administration
Amatya or Finance Minister	Maintaining public accounts
Mantri or Chronicler	Maintaining court records
Summant or Dabir or Foreign Secretary	All matters related to relationships with other states
Sachiv or Shurn Nawis or Home Secretary	Managing correspondence of the king
Panditrao or Ecclesiastical Head	Religious matters
Nyayadhis or Chief Justice	Civil and military justice
Senapati/Sari Naubat or Commander-in-Chief	All matters related to army of the king

Except the Panditrao and Nyayadhis, all other ministers held military commands, their civil duties often being performed by deputies.

=== Promotion of Marathi and Sanskrit ===
At his court, Shivaji replaced Persian, the common courtly language in the region, with Marathi, and emphasised Hindu political and courtly traditions. Shivaji's reign stimulated the deployment of Marathi as a systematic tool of description and understanding. Shivaji's royal seal was engraved in Sanskrit. Shivaji commissioned one of his officials Raghunath Pandit to make a comprehensive lexicon to replace Persian and Arabic terms in Marathi with their Sanskrit equivalents. This led to the production of the Rājavyavahārakośa, the thesaurus of state usage in 1677.

=== Religious policy ===
Many modern commentators have deemed Shivaji's religious policies as tolerant. While encouraging Hinduism, Shivaji not only allowed Muslims to practice without harassment, but supported their ministries with endowments.

Noting that Shivaji had stemmed the spread of the neighbouring Muslim states, his contemporary, the poet Kavi Bhushan stated:

Had not there been Shivaji, Kashi would have lost its culture, Mathura would have been turned into a mosque and all would have been circumcised.

However, Gijs Kruijtzer, in his book Xenophobia in Seventeenth-Century India, argues that the foundation for modern Hindu-Muslim communalism was laid in the decade 1677–1687, in the interplay between Shivaji and Aurangzeb (though Shivaji died in 1680). During the sack of Surat in 1664, Shivaji was approached by Ambrose, a Capuchin friar who asked him to spare the city's Christians. Shivaji left the Christians untouched, saying "the Frankish Padrys are good men."

Shivaji was not attempting to create a universal Hindu rule. He was tolerant of different religions and believed in syncretism. He urged Aurangzeb to act like Akbar in according respect to Hindu beliefs and places. Shivaji had little trouble forming alliances with surrounding Muslim nations, even against Hindu powers. He also did not join forces with certain other Hindu powers fighting the Mughals, such as the Rajputs. (Note: Shivaji was not attempting to create a universal Hindu rule. Over and over, he espoused tolerance and syncretism. He even called on Aurangzeb to act like Akbar in according respect to Hindu beliefs and places. Shivaji had no difficulty in allying with the Muslim states which surrounded him – Bijapur, Golconda, and the Mughals – even against Hindu powers, such as the nayaks of the Karnatic. Further, he did not ally with other Hindu powers, such as the Rajputs, rebelling against the Mughals.) His own army had Muslim leaders from early on. The first Pathan unit was formed in 1656. His admiral, Darya Sarang, was a Muslim.

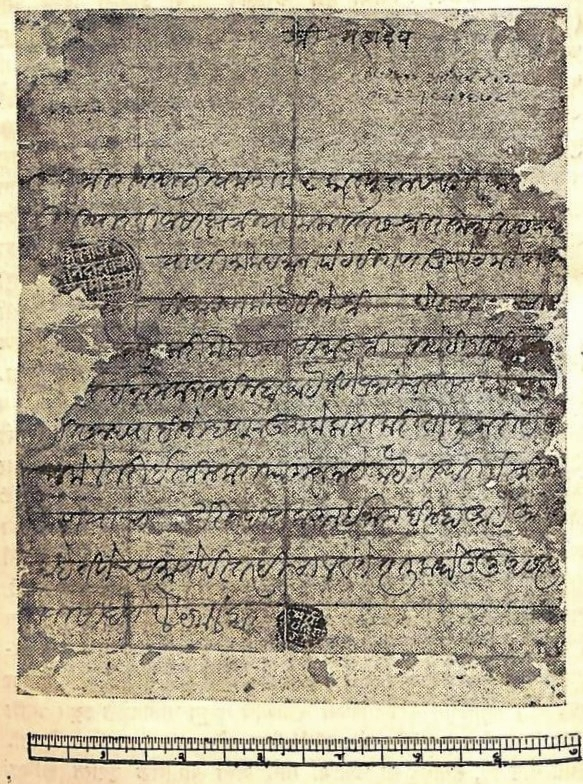
Bakhar dedicated to Shivaji

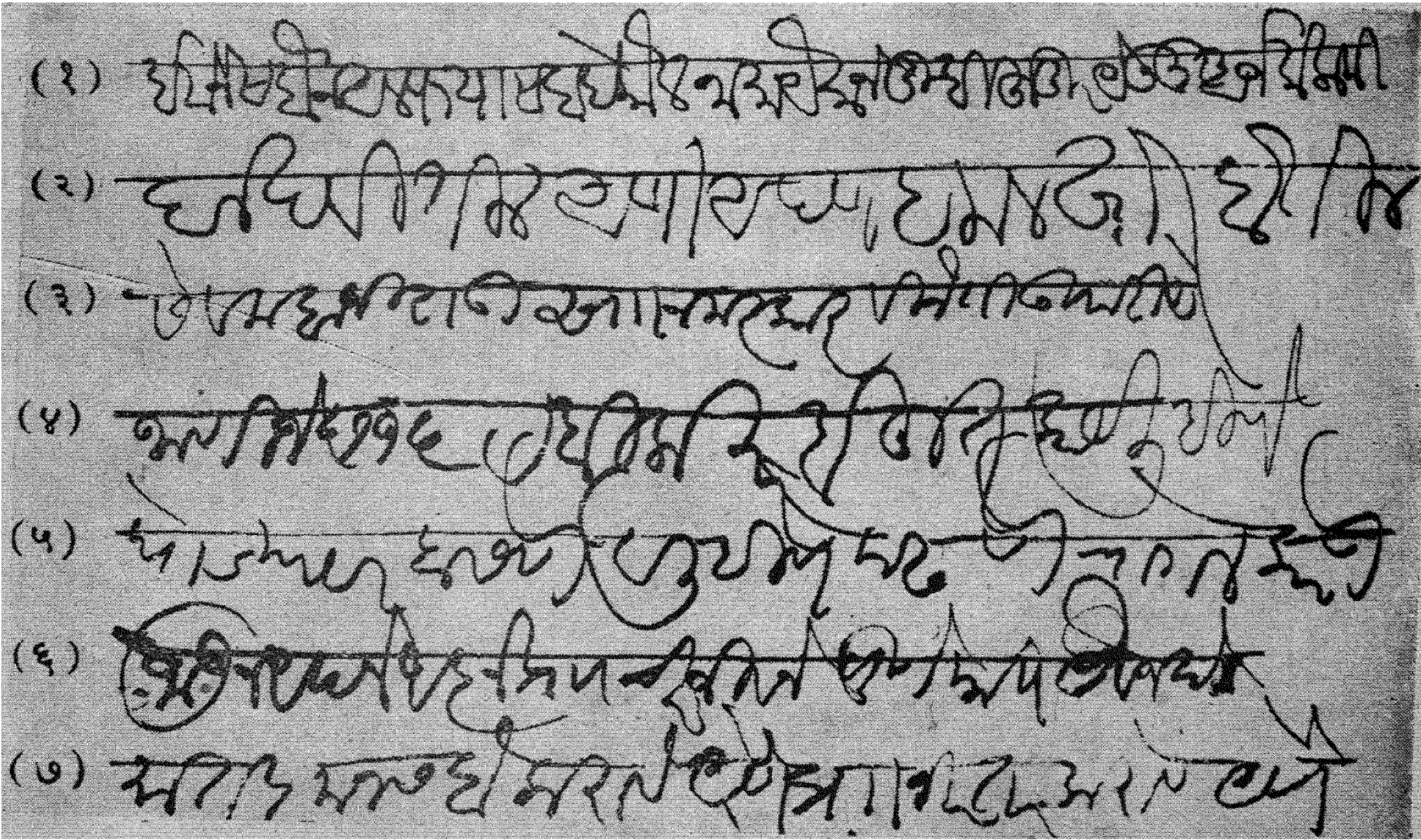
Writings of Modi Script. line 2 is from the time of Shivaji

==== Ramdas ====
Shivaji was a contemporary of Samarth Ramdas. Historian Stewart Gordon concludes about their relationship:

Older Maratha histories asserted that Shivaji was a close follower of Ramdas, a Brahmin teacher, who guided him in an orthodox Hindu path; recent research has shown that Shivaji did not meet or know Ramdas until late in his life. Rather, Shivaji followed his own judgement throughout his remarkable career.

=== Seal ===
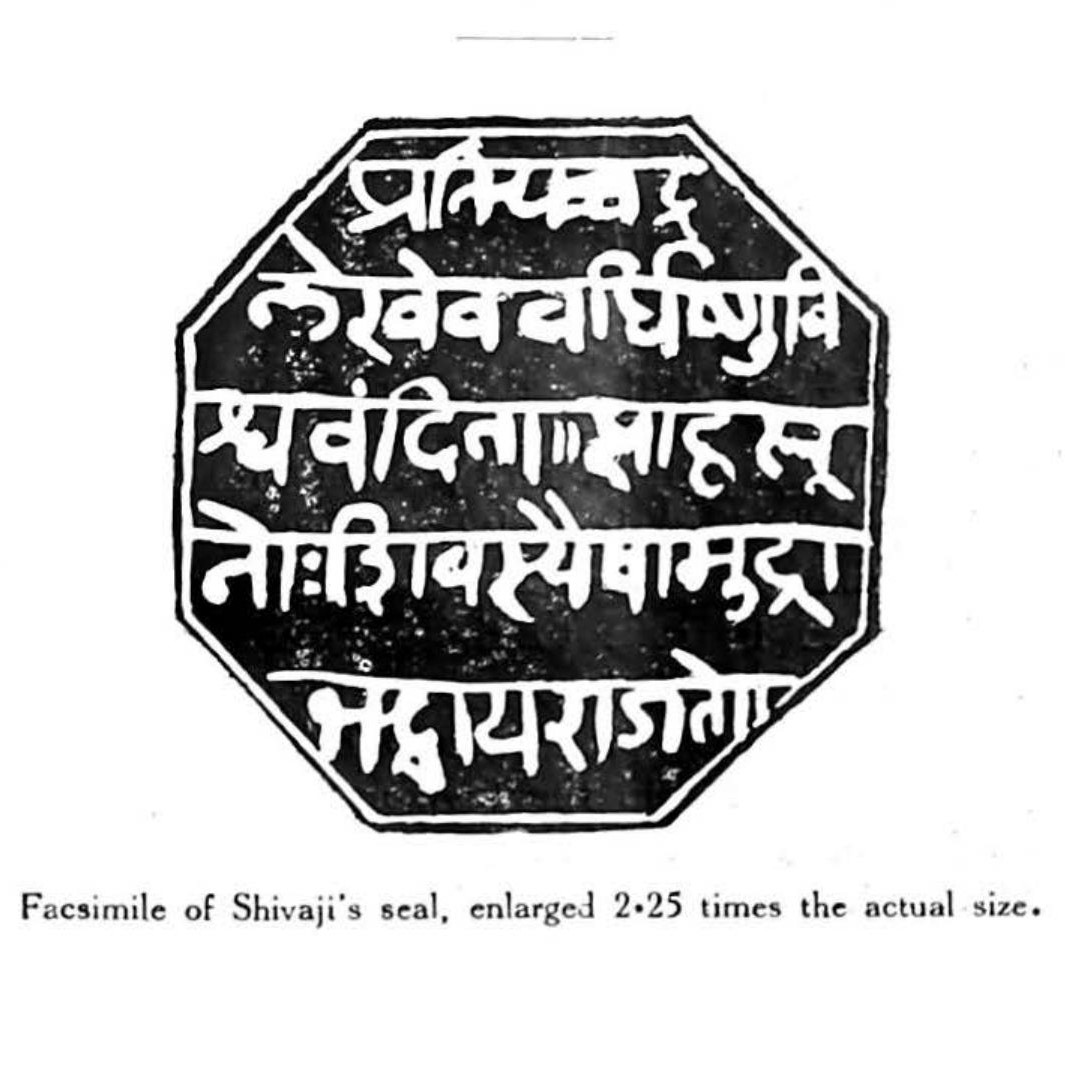
Royal seal of Shivaji

Seals were a means to confer authenticity on official documents. Shahaji and Jijabai had Persian seals. But Shivaji, right from the beginning, used Sanskrit for his seal. The seal proclaims: "This seal of Shiva, son of Shah, shines forth for the welfare of the people and is meant to command increasing respect from the universe like the first phase of the moon."

== Modes of warfare ==
Shivaji maintained a small but effective standing army. The core of Shivaji's army consisted of peasants of the Maratha and Kunbi castes. Shivaji was aware of the limitations of his army. He realised conventional warfare methods were inadequate to confront the big, well-trained cavalry of the Mughals, which was equipped with field artillery. As a result, Shivaji mastered guerilla tactics which became known as Ganimi Kawa in the Marathi language. His strategies consistently perplexed and defeated armies sent against him. He realized the most vulnerable points of the large, slow-moving armies of the time were supply chains. He utilised knowledge of the local terrain and the superior mobility of his light cavalry to cut off supplies to the enemy. Shivaji refused to confront the enemy in pitched battles. Instead, he lured the enemies into difficult hills and jungles of his own choosing, catching them at a disadvantage and routing them. Shivaji did not adhere to a particular tactic but used several methods to undermine his enemies, as required by circumstances, such as sudden raids, sweeps and ambushes, and psychological warfare.

Shivaji was contemptuously called a "Mountain Rat" by Aurangzeb and his generals, because of his guerilla tactics of attacking enemy forces and then retreating into his mountain forts.

=== Military ===
Shivaji demonstrated great skill in creating his military organisation, which lasted until the demise of the Maratha Empire. His strategy rested on leveraging his ground forces, naval forces, and series of forts across his territory. The Maval infantry served as the core of his ground forces (reinforced by Telangi musketeers from Karnataka) and supported by Maratha cavalry. His artillery was relatively underdeveloped and reliant on European suppliers, further inclining him to a very mobile form of warfare.

=== Hill forts ===
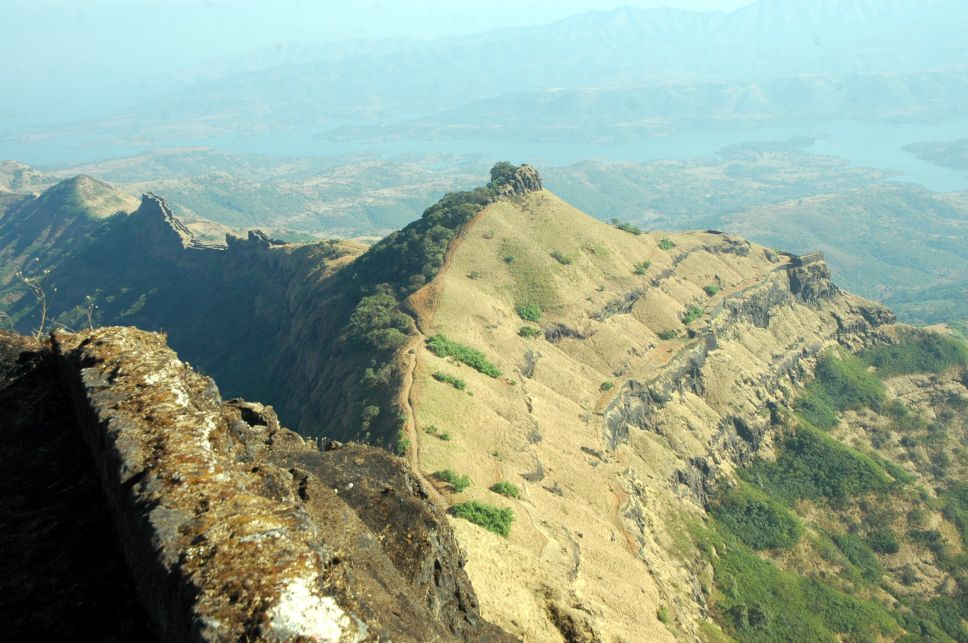
Suvela Machi, view of southern sub-plateaux, as seen from Ballekilla, Rajgad

Hill forts played a key role in Shivaji's strategy. Ramchandra Amatya, one of Shivaji's ministers, describes the achievement of Shivaji by saying his empire was created from forts. Shivaji captured important Adilshahi forts at Murambdev (Rajgad), Torna, Kondhana (Sinhagad), and Purandar. He also rebuilt or repaired many forts in advantageous locations. In addition, Shivaji built a number of forts, numbering 111 according to some accounts, but it is likely the actual number "did not exceed 18." Historian Jadunath Sarkar assessed Shivaji owned some 240–280 forts at the time of his death. Each was placed under three officers of equal status, lest a single traitor be bribed or tempted to deliver it to the enemy. The officers acted jointly and provided mutual checks and balances.

=== Navy ===
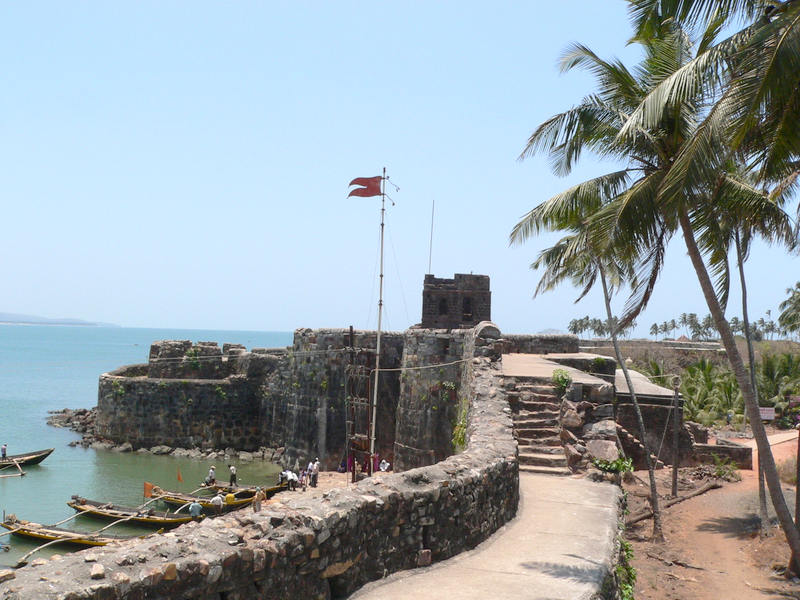
Sindudurg Fort provided anchorages for Shivaji's Navy

Aware of the need for naval power to maintain control along the Konkan coast, Shivaji began to build his navy in 1657 or 1659, with the purchase of twenty galivats from the Portuguese shipyards of Bassein. Marathi chronicles state that at its height his fleet counted some 400 warships, although contemporary English chronicles counter that the number never exceeded 160.

With the Marathas being accustomed to a land-based military, Shivaji widened his search for qualified crews for his ships, taking on lower-caste Hindus of the coast who were long familiar with naval operations (the famed "Malabar pirates"), as well as Muslim mercenaries. Noting the power of the Portuguese navy, Shivaji hired a number of Portuguese sailors and Goan Christian converts and made Rui Leitao Viegas commander of his fleet. Viegas was later to defect back to the Portuguese, taking 300 sailors with him.

Shivaji fortified his coastline by seizing coastal forts and refurbishing them. He built his first marine fort at Sindhudurg, which was to become the headquarters of the Maratha navy. The navy itself was a coastal navy, focused on travel and combat in the littoral areas and not intended for the high seas.

== Legacy ==
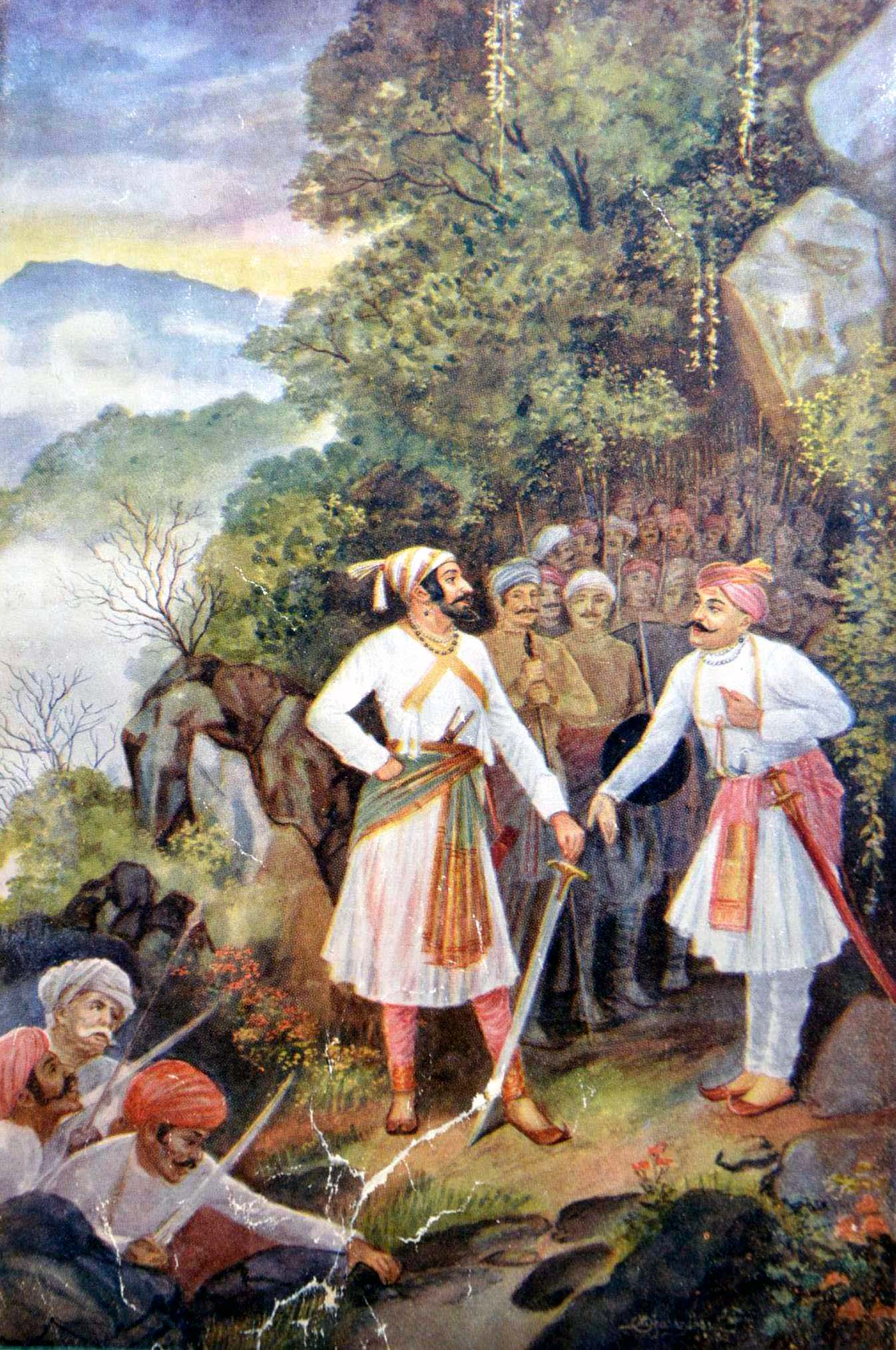
An early-20th-century painting by M. V. Dhurandhar of Shivaji and Baji Prabhu at Pawan Khind

=== Contemporaneous view ===
Shivaji was admired for his heroic exploits and clever stratagems in the contemporary accounts of English, French, Dutch, Portuguese, and Italian writers. The French traveller Francois Bernier wrote in his Travels in Mughal India:

I forgot to mention that during pillage of Sourate, Seva-Gy, the Holy Seva-Gi! respected the habitation of the Reverend Father Ambrose, the Capuchin missionary. 'The Frankish Padres are good men', he said 'and shall not be attacked.' He spared also the house of a deceased Delale or Gentile broker, of the Dutch, because assured that he had been very charitable while alive.

Mughal depictions of Shivaji were largely negative, referring to him simply as "Shiva" without the honorific "-ji". One Mughal writer in the early 1700s described Shivaji's death as kafir bi jahannum raft (lit. 'the infidel went to Hell'). His chivalrous treatment of enemies and women has been praised by Mughal authors, including Khafi Khan. Jadunath Sarkar writes:

His chivalry to women and strict enforcement of morality in his camp was a wonder in that age and has extorted the admiration of hostile critics like Khafi Khan.

=== Early depictions ===
The earliest depictions of Shivaji by authors not affiliated with Maratha court in Maharashtra are to be found in the bakhars that depict Shivaji as an almost divine figure, an ideal Hindu king who overthrew Muslim dominion. The current academic consensus is that while these Bakhars are important for understanding how Shivaji was viewed in his time, they must be correlated with other sources to decide historical truth. Sabhasad Bakhar and 91 Kalami Bakhar are considered the most reliable of all bakhars by scholars.

=== Nineteenth century ===
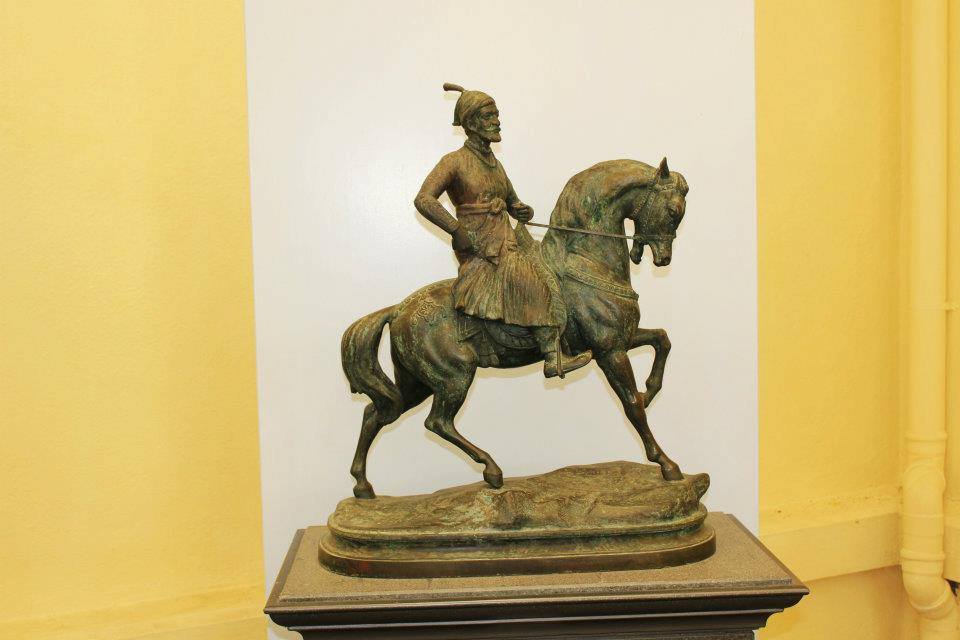
A miniature Bronze statue of Shivaji in the collection of the Shri Bhavani Museum of Aundh

In the mid–19th century, Marathi social reformer Jyotirao Phule wrote his interpretation of the Shivaji legend, portraying him as a hero of the shudras and dalits. Phule's 1869 ballad-form story of Shivaji was met with great hostility by the Brahmin-dominated media.

In 1895, Indian nationalist leader Bal Gangadhar Tilak organised what was to be an annual festival to mark the birthday of Shivaji. He portrayed Shivaji as the "opponent of the oppressor", with possible negative implications concerning the colonial government. Tilak denied any suggestion that his festival was anti-Muslim or disloyal to the government, but simply a celebration of a hero. These celebrations prompted a British commentator in 1906 to note: "Cannot the annals of the Hindu race point to a single hero whom even the tongue of slander will not dare call a chief of dacoits...?"

One of the first commentators to reappraise the critical British view of Shivaji was M. G. Ranade, whose Rise of the Maratha Power (1900) declared Shivaji's achievements as the beginning of modern nation-building. Ranade criticised earlier British portrayals of Shivaji's state as "a freebooting power, which thrived by plunder and adventure, and succeeded only because it was the most cunning and adventurous ... This is a very common feeling with the readers, who derive their knowledge of these events solely from the works of English historians."

In 1919, Sarkar published the seminal Shivaji and His Times. Sarkar was able to read primary sources in Persian, Marathi, and Arabic, but was challenged for his criticism of the "chauvinism" of Marathi historians' views of Shivaji. Likewise, although supporters cheered his depiction of the killing of Afzal Khan as justified, they decried Sarkar writing about the killing of the Hindu raja Chandrao More and his clan as a murder.

In 1937, Dennis Kincaid, a British civil servant in India, published The Grand Rebel. This book portrays Shivaji as a heroic rebel and a master strategist fighting a much larger Mughal army.

=== Post independence ===
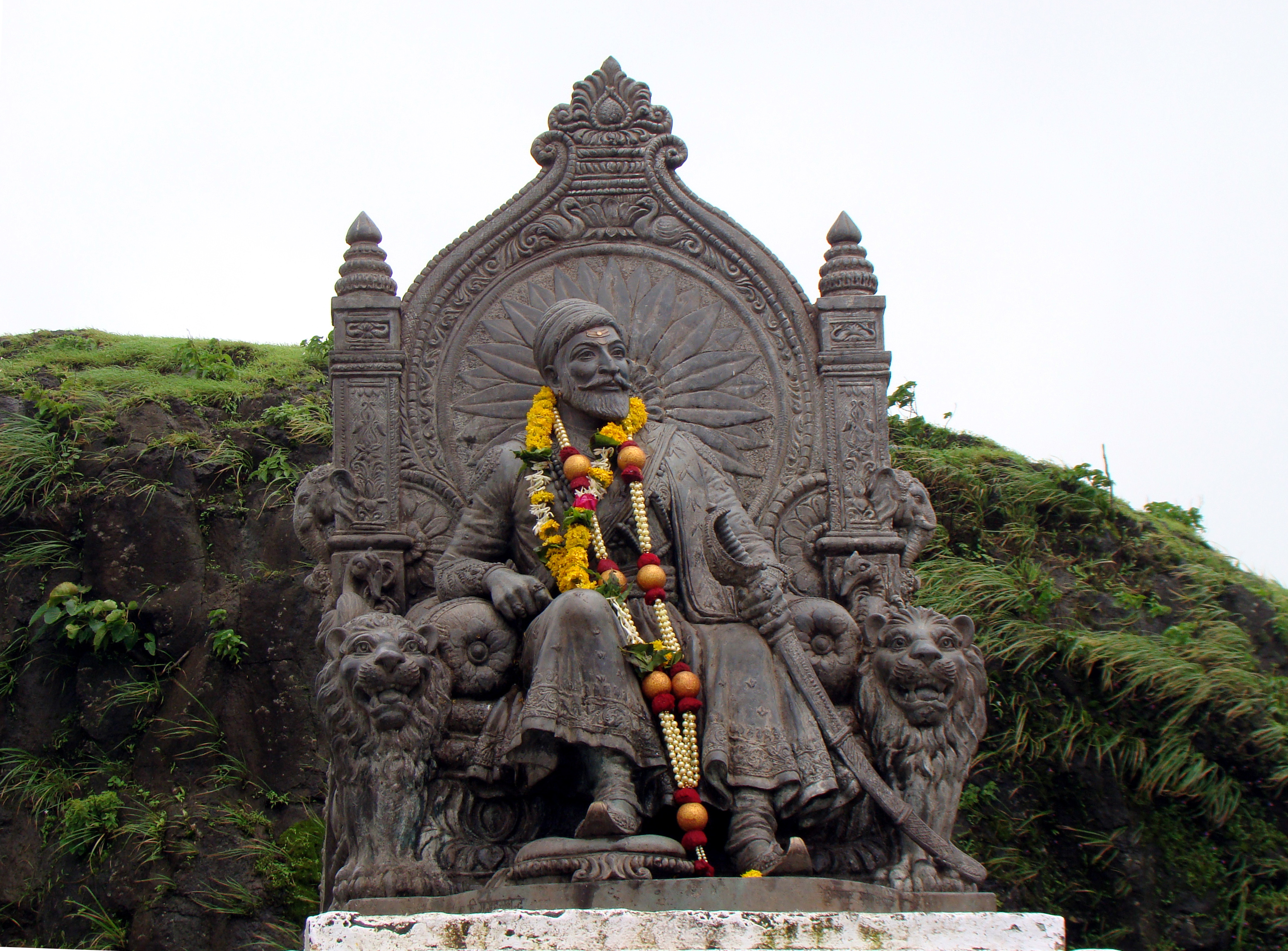
Statue of Shivaji at Raigad Fort

In modern times, Shivaji is considered as a national hero in India, especially in the state of Maharashtra, where he remains an important figure in the state's history. Stories of his life form an integral part of the upbringing and identity of the Marathi people.

Hindutva activists are noted for appropriating Shivaji by presenting him as a "Hindu king" who "fought against Muslim rulers", contrary to historic accounts that show he belonged to a marginalised caste and held secular values.

==== Political parties ====
In 1966, the Shiv Sena (lit. 'Army of Shivaji') political party was formed to promote the interests of Marathi-speaking people in the face of migration to Maharashtra from other parts of India, and the accompanying loss of power of locals. His image adorns the literature, propaganda, and icons of the party.

Shivaji is seen as a hero by regional political parties and also by the Maratha-caste-dominated Indian National Congress and the Nationalist Congress Party.

=== Controversies related to Shivaji's depiction ===
In the late 20th century, Babasaheb Purandare became one of the most significant authors in portraying Shivaji in his writings, leading him to be declared in 1964 as the Shiv-Shahir (lit. 'Bard of Shivaji'). However, Purandare, a Brahmin, was also accused of overstating the influence of Brahmin gurus on Shivaji, and his Maharashtra Bhushan award ceremony in 2015 was protested by those claiming he had defamed Shivaji.

In 1993, the Illustrated Weekly published an article suggesting Shivaji was not opposed to Muslims per se, and that his style of governance was influenced by that of the Mughal Empire. Congress Party members called for legal actions against the publisher and writer, Marathi newspapers accused them of "imperial prejudice", and the Shiv Sena called for the writer's public flogging. The state of Maharashtra brought legal action against the publisher under regulations prohibiting enmity between religious and cultural groups, but a High Court found the Illustrated Weekly had operated within the bounds of freedom of expression.

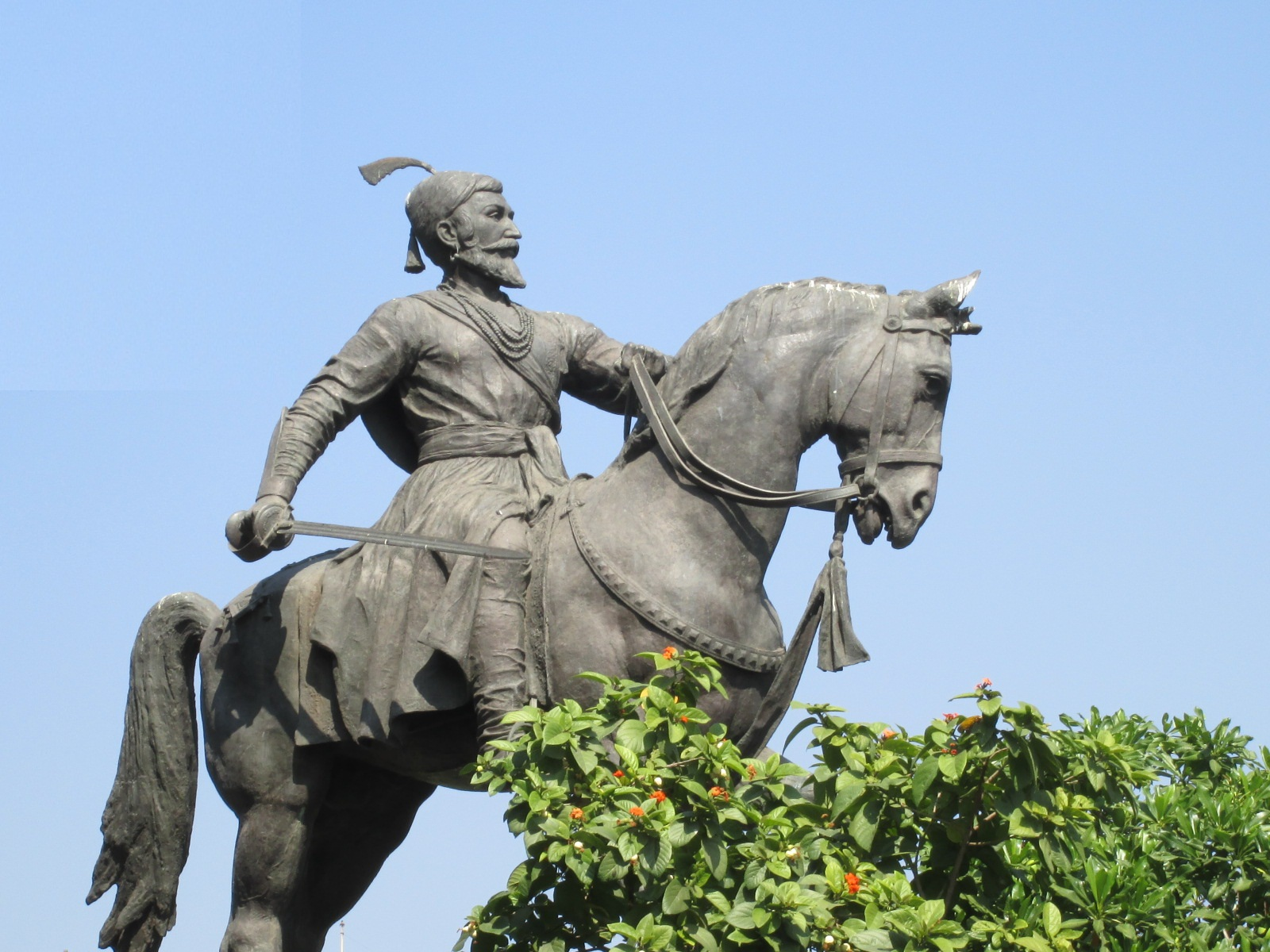
Statue of Shivaji opposite the Gateway of India in South Mumbai

In 2003, the American academic James W. Laine published his book Shivaji: Hindu King in Islamic India to, what Ananya Vajpeyi terms, a regime of "cultural policing by militant Marathas". As a result of this publication, the Bhandarkar Oriental Research Institute in Pune, where Laine had done research, was attacked by the Sambhaji Brigade. Laine was even threatened with arrest, and the book was banned in Maharashtra in January 2004. The ban was lifted by the Bombay High Court in 2007, and in July 2010 the Supreme Court of India upheld the lifting of the ban. This lifting was followed by public demonstrations against the author and the decision of the Supreme Court.

== Commemorations ==
In recent years Hindu nationalists have increasingly erected statues of Shivaji outside Maharashtra, sometimes illegally. Statues are found in every taluka (subdistrict) in Maharashtra, as well as in many places across India, including Mumbai, Pune, New Delhi, Surat, and Yellur. There are also statues outside India including in San Jose, California, and Mauritius.

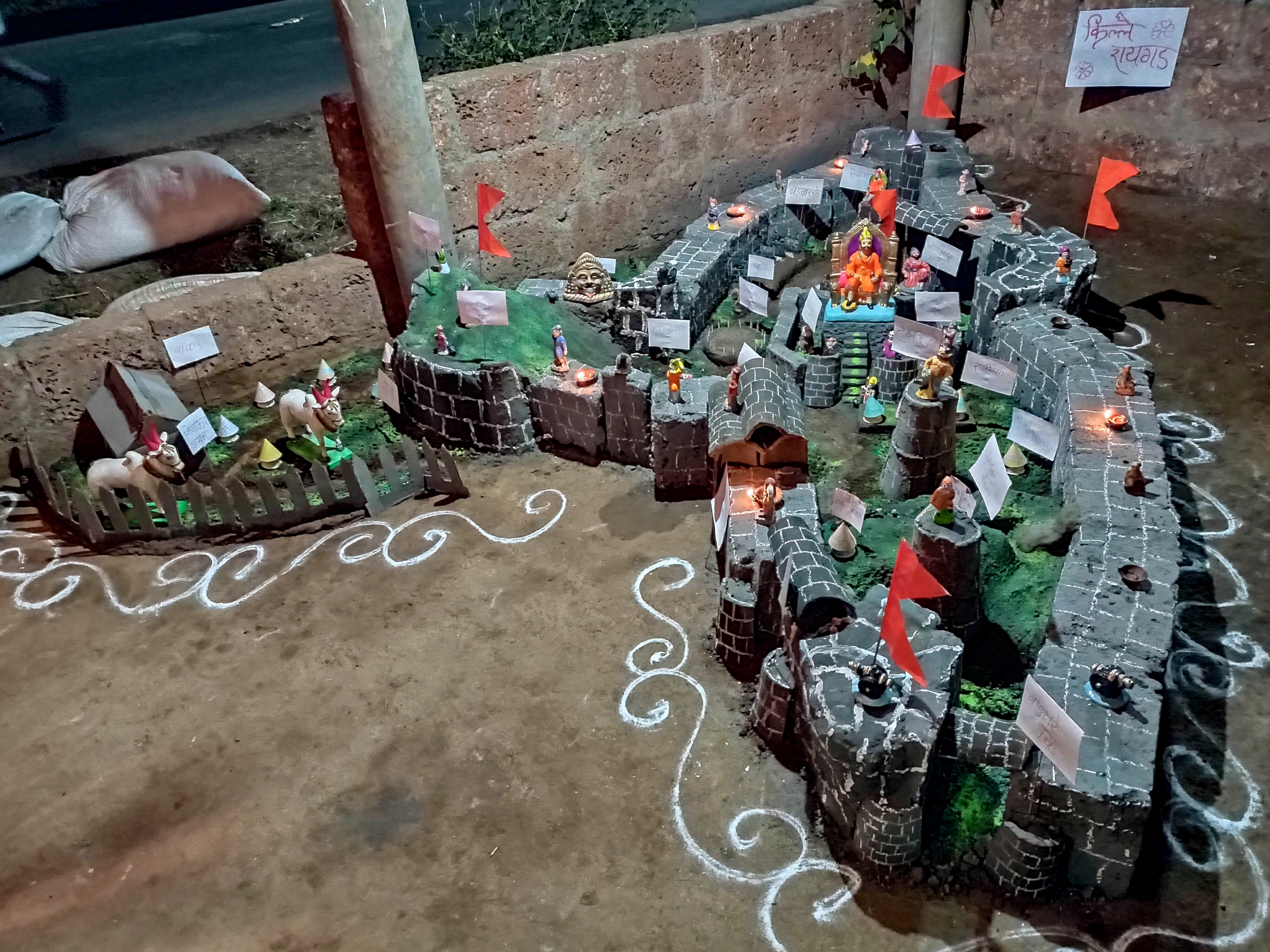
A replica of Raigad Fort built by children on the occasion of Diwali as a tribute to Shivaji

Several Mumbai landmarks were renamed for Shivaji in the 1990s, around the same time Bombay was renamed Mumbai. The Prince of Wales Museum, which is devoted to Indian history, was renamed Chhatrapati Shivaji Maharaj Vastu Sangrahalaya. Victoria Terminus, Mumbai's main railway station and the headquarters of the Central Railway zone, was initially renamed Chhatrapati Shivaji Terminus and later renamed Chhatrapati Shivaji Maharaj Terminus. Similarly, Mumbai's busiest airport, Sahar International Airport, was first renamed Chhatrapati Shivaji International Airport and further renamed to Chhatrapati Shivaji Maharaj International Airport.

Other commemorations include the Indian Navy's INS Shivaji station and numerous postage stamps. In 2022, the Indian prime minister unveiled the new ensign of the Indian Navy, which was inspired by the seal of Shivaji. In Maharashtra, there has been a long tradition of children building replica forts with toy soldiers and other figures during the festival of Diwali, in memory of Shivaji.

A proposal to build a giant memorial called Shiv Smarak was approved in 2016; the memorial is to be located near Mumbai on a small island in the Arabian Sea. It will be 210 metres (690 ft) tall, which will make it the world's tallest statue when completed. As of August 2021, the project has been stalled since January 2019, due to the COVID-19 pandemic. Only the bathymetry survey has been completed, while the geotechnical survey was underway. Consequently, the state public works department proposed extending the completion date by a year, from 18 October 2021 to 18 October 2022.

== Sources ==
=== Bibliography ===
- Asher, Catherine B.; Talbot, Cynthia (2006), India Before Europe, Cambridge University Press, ISBN 978-0-521-80904-7
- Cashman, Richard I (1975), The Myth of the Lokamanya: Tilak and Mass Politics in Maharashtra, University of California Press, ISBN 978-0-520-02407-6
- Eaton, Richard Maxwell (2015), The Sufis of Bijapur, 1300–1700: Social Roles of Sufis in Medieval India, Princeton University Press, ISBN 978-1-4008-6815-5
- Eraly, Abraham (2000), Emperors of the Peacock Throne: The Saga of the Great Mughals, Penguin Books India, ISBN 978-0-14-100143-2
- Farooqui, Salma Ahmed (2011), A Comprehensive History of Medieval India: Twelfth to the Mid-Eighteenth Century, Pearson Education India, ISBN 978-81-317-3202-1
- Gier, Nicholas F. (2014), The Origins of Religious Violence: An Asian Perspective, Lexington Books, ISBN 978-0-7391-9223-8
- Gordon, Stewart (1993), The Marathas 1600–1818, Cambridge University Press, ISBN 978-0-521-26883-7
  - Gordon, Stewart (2007). The Marathas 1600–1818. Cambridge University Press. ISBN 978-0-521-03316-9.
- Haig, Wolseley; Burn, Richard (1960) [first published 1937], The Cambridge History of India, Volume IV: The Mughal Period, Cambridge University Press
- Jasper, Daniel (2003). "Commemorating the 'golden age' of Shivaji in Maharashtra, India, and the development of Maharashtrian public politics". Journal of Political and Military Sociology. 31 (2): 215–230. JSTOR 45293740. S2CID 152003918.
- Kamdar, Mira (2018), India in the 21st Century: What Everyone Needs to Know, Oxford University Press, pp. 41–, ISBN 978-0-19-997360-6
- Knipe, David M. (2015), Vedic Voices: Intimate Narratives of a Living Andhra Tradition, Oxford University Press, pp. 40–, ISBN 978-0-19-026673-8
- Laine, James W. (2011), "Resisting My Attackers; Resisting My Defenders", in Schmalz, Matthew N.; Gottschalk, Peter (eds.), Engaging South Asian Religions: Boundaries, Appropriations, and Resistances, Albany: SUNY Press, pp. 153–172, ISBN 978-1-4384-3323-3
- Mehta, Jaswant Lal (2009) [1984], Advanced Study in the History of Medieval India, Sterling Publishers Pvt. Ltd, ISBN 978-81-207-1015-3
- Mehta, Jaswant Lal (2005), Advanced Study in the History of Modern India: Volume One: 1707–1813, Sterling Publishers Pvt. Ltd, ISBN 978-1-932705-54-6
- Deshpande, Anirudh (2015). "Introduction". In Pansare, Govind (ed.). Who Was Shivaji?. LeftWord. ISBN 978-9380118130.
- Ravishankar, Chinya V. (2018), Sons of Sarasvati: Late Exemplars of the Indian Intellectual Tradition, State University of New York Press, ISBN 978-1-4384-7185-3
- Robb, Peter (2011), A History of India, Macmillan, ISBN 978-0-230-34424-2
- Roy, Kaushik (2015), Military Manpower, Armies and Warfare in South Asia, Routledge, ISBN 978-1-317-32128-6
- Roy, Tirthankar (2013), An Economic History of Early Modern India, Routledge, ISBN 978-1-135-04787-0
- Pagadi, Setumadhava Rao (1983), Shivaji, National Book Trust, India
- Sarkar, Jadunath (1920) [1919], Shivaji and His Times (Second ed.), London: Longmans, Green and Co.
- Sarkar, Jadunath (1920), History of Aurangzib: Based on Original Sources, Longmans, Green and Company
- Sardesai, Govind Sakharam (1957) [1946], New History of the Marathas: Shivaji and his line (1600–1707), Phoenix Publications
- Stein, Burton (1987), Vijayanagara (The New Cambridge History of India), Cambridge and New York: Cambridge University Press, ISBN 0-521-26693-9
- Subrahmanyam, Sanjay (2002), The Political Economy of Commerce: Southern India 1500–1650, Cambridge University Press, ISBN 978-0-521-89226-1
- Truschke, Audrey (2017), Aurangzeb: The Life and Legacy of India's Most Controversial King, Stanford University Press, ISBN 978-1-5036-0259-5
- Wolpert, Stanley A. (1962), Tilak and Gokhale: Revolution and Reform in the Making of Modern India, University of California Press
- Zakaria, Rafiq (2002), Communal Rage In Secular India, Popular Prakashan, ISBN 978-81-7991-070-2

Shivaji House of Bhonsle Born: c. 1627/1630 Died: 3 April 1680
Regnal titles
New title new state formed	Chhatrapati of the Maratha Empire; 1674–1680	Succeeded by Sambhaji
