= 91 Kalami Bakhar =

Marathi language biography of Shivaji

- Author: Dattaji Trimal / Khando Annaji Malkare
- Original title: Shri Shiva Chhatrapatichi 91 Kalmi Bakhar
- Language: Marathi
- Subject: Biography of Shivaji
- Genre: Bakhar
- Publication date: 17th-18th century
- Publication place: India

Shri Shiva Chhatrapatichi 91 Kalmi Bakhar, better known as 91-Kalami Bakhar, is a Marathi language biography of Shivaji, the founder of the Maratha Empire. Its name is also transliterated as 91 Kalmi Bakhar, 91 Qalmi Bakhar, 91 Qalami Bakhar, and Ekkyannav Kalmi Bakhar. Organized into 91 sections (kalams), it is an important source of information about Shivaji's life for modern historians. The original text was composed by Shivaji's courtier Dattaji Trimal, but is now lost: its extracts survive in later recensions. Although the original text was the earliest bakhar about Shivaji's life, the interpolations in these recensions have rendered the surviving text unreliable.

== Original text ==
According to tradition, the 91 Kalmi Bakhar was written by Shivaji's courtier Dattaji Trimbak (or Trimal) Wakenavis (or Waknis), who was a member of his Ashta Pradhan council of ministers, and accompanied him to the Mughal court in Agra. Internal evidence suggests that the original text was written before 1713, probably as early as before 1685.

== Later recensions ==
The original text written by Dattaji is now largely lost, although some extracts from it are available in several later recensions. These recensions survive in form of six manuscripts, and despite the text's title, some of them contain 96 sections. These contents of these recensions vary, and are sometimes mutually contradictory.

The earliest surviving manuscript of the text was made by Khando Annaji Malkare, probably during 1720–1740. It contain several interpolations, and includes legends with supernatural elements. Much of the text in this recension is about Khando's father Anaji Malkare, and these interpolations have rendered it unreliable.

Tarikh-i-Shivaji appears to be a Persian language translation of 91 Kalami Bakhar.

== Modern editions ==
During British Raj, multiple modern scholars published various recensions of the text:

- V. K. Rajwade in Prabhat
- Kashinath Narayan Sane in Kavyetihasa-Sangraha
- D. B. Parasnis in Bharatavarsha

In 1806, Lt. E. J. Frissell translated the Raigad manuscript of the bakhar into English; this translation was published in George Forrest's Selections from Bombay State Papers. In 1907, Jadunath Sarkar published another English translation in Modern Review. In 1930, V. S. Wakaskar republished the earlier editions in one place.
