= Bakhar =

Marathi-language historical narrative

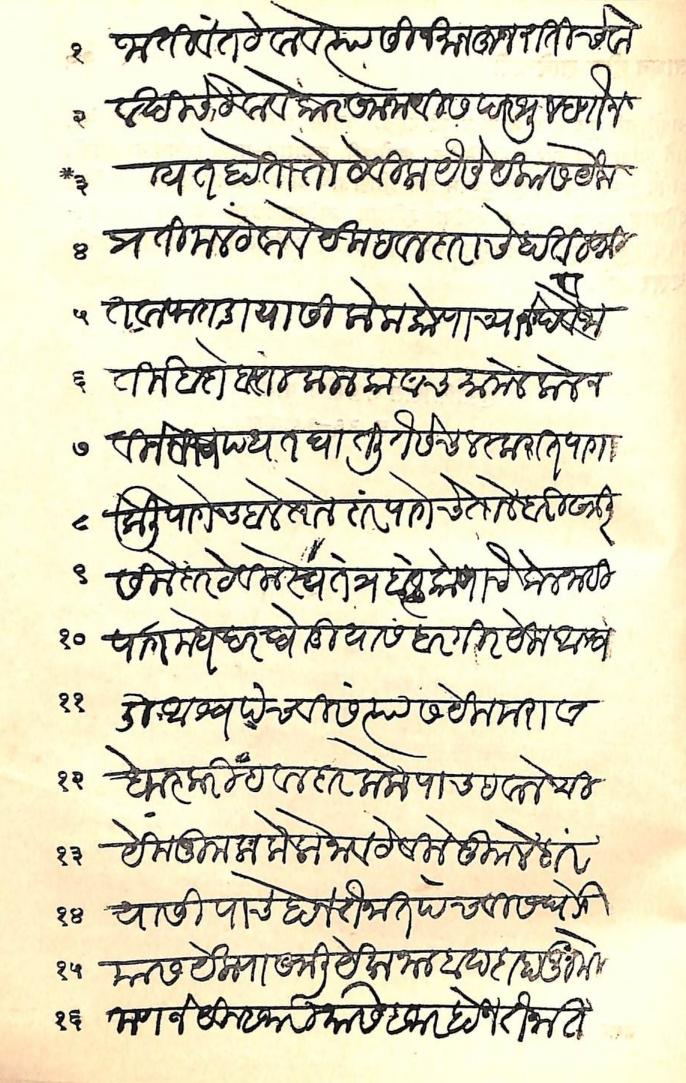

Bakhar is a form of historical narrative written in Marathi prose. Bakhars are one of the earliest genres of medieval Marathi literature. More than 200 bakhars were written in the seventeenth to nineteenth centuries, the most important of them chronicling the deeds of the Maratha ruler Shivaji. Bakhars are considered valuable resources depicting the Maratha view of history.

== Etymology ==
Most scholars believe that the word bakhar is a metathesis of the Arabic-origin word khabar ("information"). S. N. Joshi argues that the word is derived from the Persian word khair or bakhair ("all is well", the end salutation in a letter), since it appears at the end of most texts. Bapuji Sankpal argued that the word is derived from the Sanskrit-origin word akhyayika ("story") or it could be bhyaakh ( bhiyakhya).

== Style ==
The principal characteristics of bakhars are that they were written in prose, had a forceful style of writing, were of political historical nature which appealed to Maratha patriotism, were often commissioned by a patron, displayed an acceptance of tradition and also a belief in the supernatural. Early bakhars were sparsely written and contained a number of words of Persian derivation, later works tended to be voluminous and contained Sanskritised prose.

== History ==
The earliest dates associated with a bakhar are 1448 or 1455, by different authors, being considered as the year that the prose part of Mahikavatichi Bakhar, comprising the second and third chapters, was written by Keshavacharya. The bakhar, which is the compilation of three authors of the 15th and 16th centuries - Bhagwan, Datta and Keshavacharya - is significant as the earliest attempt at uniting the Marathi-speaking populace against oppressive Bahmani rule.

There are around 200 known bakhars, fifty or so of which are considered to be notable, while some others have not been published at all. All the bakhars except for the early works, such as Sabhasad Bakhar, 91 Kalmi Bakhar and the Ajnyapatra Bakhar besides others, are considered to be written between 1760 and 1850 during the heyday of the Peshwas.

At least eleven bakhars have been written principally about Shivaji's life and rule, of which Sabhasad Bakhar, 91 Kalmi Bakhar are the most important, some others being derivations of Sabhasad Bakhar of varying reliability. These have been valuable resource material for historians chronicling Shivali's life and achievements.

== List of bakhars ==
Some of the bakhars include:

Bakhar	Date	Writer	Description	Reference
Mahikavatichi Bakhar	15th and 16th centuries	Bhagwan, Datta and Keshavacharya	the earliest attempt at uniting the Marathi-speaking populace against oppressive Bahmani rule	
Sabhasad Bakhar	c. 1697	Krishnaji Anant Sabhasad (official in Shivaji's administration)	One of the earliest biographical narratives on Shivaji, written at fort Jinji in 1697 by a courtier of Shivaji and his son, Chhtrapati Rajaram	
91 Kalmi Bakhar	Written in the 18th century by unknown writer. Few scholars such as Jadunath sarkar treat it as contemporary work however Surendranath Sen assign this a late 1760 composition because of its inaccuracies and inconsistency.	Author not known, multiple versions of book by various scholars.		
Chitnis Bakhar	c. 1811	Malhar Ramrao Chitnis (senior writer/Chitnis in the Satara court of Shahu II		
Peshwyanchi Bakhar	c. 1818	An erstwhile Peshwa official (probably Krishnaji Vinayak Sohoni)	Narrates the history of the Peshwas	
Bhausahebanchi Bakhar	1761	Krishnaji Shamrao, possibly a courtier of the Scindia	Account of the Battle of Panipat (1761)	

== Reliability ==
Most historians have long neglected as unreliable, due to their colourful literary style with elements of Marathi, Sanskrit aphorisms and Persian administrative jargon. However, bakhars are recently being investigated for their historical content.

James Grant Duff relied on bakhars in the making of his "History of the Marathas". Shankar Gopal Tulpule described the bakhars as a reliable source of history, while the Indian nationalist historian Vishwanath Kashinath Rajwade (1864–1926) described them as "full of meaningless verbosity" and "fragmented, contradictory, vague and unreliable". Jadunath Sarkar (1870–1958) also described them as "collections of gossip and tradition, sometimes no better than opium-eaters' tales".
