= Sabhasad Bakhar =

Marathi language biography of Shivaji

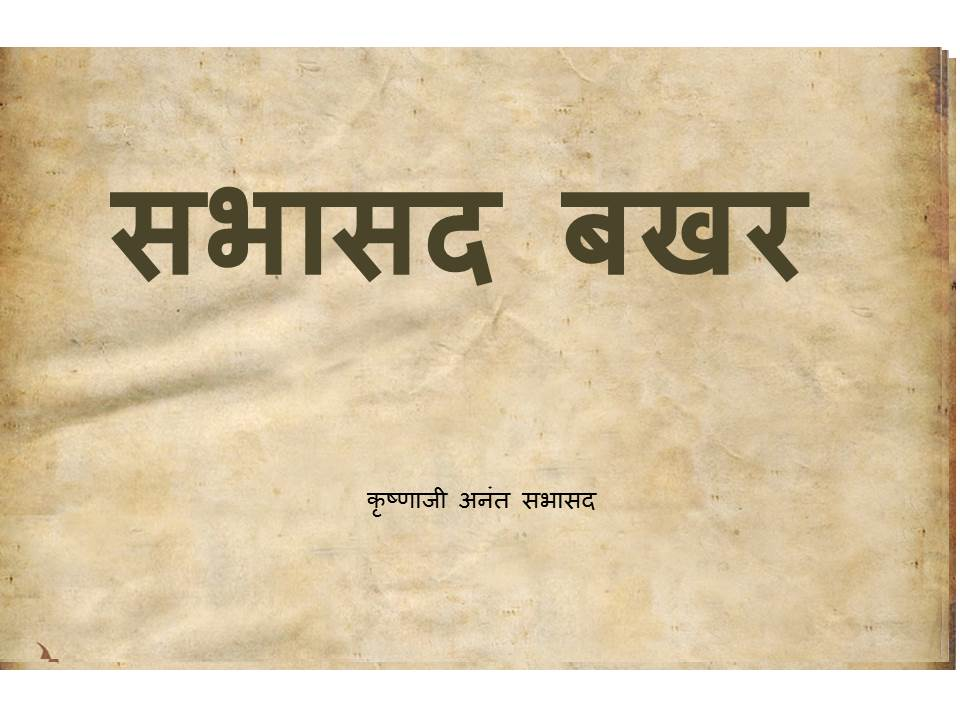
- Author: Krishnaji Anant Sabhasad
- Original title: Shri-Shiva-Prabhuche-Charitra
- Language: Marathi
- Subject: Biography of Shivaji
- Genre: Bakhar
- Publication date: 1697
- Publication place: India

Shri-Shiva-Prabhuche-Charitra (IAST: Sri-Aiva-Prabhuce-Caritra), better known as Sabhasad Bakhar, is a Marathi language biography of Shivaji, the founder of the Maratha Empire. It was written by Krishnaji Anant Sabhasad at Jinji, at the court of Shivaji's son Rajaram in 1697.

The text describes several notable events in Shivaji's life, including Shivaji's killing of Afzal Khan, his visit to and escape from the Mughal court, his coronation, and his meeting with Venkoji. Since the author was a contemporary of Shivaji, it is considered the most reliable bakhar about the king's life.

The Siva Chhatrapati volume is the English translation of the Sabhasad Bakhar.
