= Mahikavatichi Bakhar =

Marathi language chronicle

- V. K. Rajwade's critical edition
- Author: Keshavacharya et al.
- Original title: महिकावतीची बखर
- Language: Marathi
- Subject: Genealogy, History
- Genre: Bakhar
- Set in: northern Konkan
- Publication date: 15th–17th century
- English publication date: 1924

Mahikavatichi Bakhar ("The Annals of Mahikavati"), also known as Śrī Biṁbākhyāna, is a Marathi language chronicle about the medieval history of northern Konkan region of present-day Maharashtra, India. Originally written by Keshavacharya in the 15th century, it was updated by several authors before being finalized as a single book in the 17th century. Although full of historical inaccuracies, it is an important source for the history of the Mumbai region.

== Authorship ==
Mahikavatichi Bakhar, also known as Mahimchi bakhar, is the earliest extant bakhar: Keshavacharya wrote the oldest part of the text (Chapters 2 and 3) around 1448 CE. Nayako-rao, a revenue collection officer (Desala or Deshala) of Malad, commissioned this part of the text, intending to use genealogies to legitimize the hereditary revenue collection rights of the local officials. Several authors updated and edited the text in the later years, and its final version appeared as a book in the 17th century.

Three critical editions of the text have been published, edited by different scholars:

- R. P. Rane (1877)
- V. K. Rajwade (1924)
- R. C. Dhere (1973), titled Mahikāvatīcī Bakhara

Sandeep Dahisarkar edited a fourth version of the text, found in the archives of the Bharat Itihas Sanshodhak Mandal, Pune. This manuscript, written by Lakṣumaṇa Prabhu is titled Biṁbākhyāna ("The Ākhyāna of Bimba"): it does not adhere to the bakhar style, which features a mix of prose and poetry. It is in poetic form, and is better described as an "ākhyāna" - a form of narrative poetry encapsulating stories.

== Contents ==
The text describes the historical events and places of the Aparanta region, corresponding to the northern Konkan region of present-day Maharashtra. It covers the period from the arrival of king Pratap Bimb (c. 1138) in the region to the Portuguese conquest (c. 1538) of the region.

Rajwade's critical edition of the text includes the following chapters:

No.	Author	Content	Time Period (CE)
1	Bhagvan Datta (editor)	Tradition, evolution of races and ancestry, varna system	1500-1578
2	Keshavacharya	Ancestries	1370-1448
3	Keshavacharya	Judgments and events	1370-1448
4	Bhagvan Datta (editor)	Shri Chintamani Kaustubh Puran (History of Mahim)	1500-1578
5	Anonymous	Ancestry of the Pathare community	1460-1538
6	Nayak and Kavale	Ancestry	1400-1478
-	Anonymous	Verses related to Vijayanagara, Babur etc.	1600-1676

=== Background ===
Keshavacharya provides the objective of the text in its second chapter, which focuses on genealogies (variously called Vamsh-patra, Vamsh-padhati or Vamsha-val). According to Keshavacharya, before he started writing the text, the Muslim invaders (variously called mlecchas, turakans, or yavanas in the text) had conquered the areas surrounding northern Konkan, including Paithan and Champaner. As predicted in the Bhavishyottara Purana, these invaders were expected to mistreat those with a high status in the varna system, causing the locals to lose their varna and the clan (kula) identities. A goddess named "Shri-devi Adiyashakti Jagdambika Maharshtra-dharma rakshika" appeared in a dream to Nayako-rao, just before the arrival of the invaders, and ordered him to gather all the officials and Brahmins of the region, and to encourage them to protect the local religious tradition (Maharashtra-dharma or swa-dharma). As a result, Nayako-rao asked Keshavacharya to document the genealogy of the local officials to avoid neglect of the varna and the clan identities. The text mainly focuses on using genealogies to legitimize the hereditary rights of the local revenue collectors (Desalas). It implies that the mleccha conquests are expected in the Kali Yuga as predicted by the Puranas, and mentions several instances of Muslim rulers approving the hereditary rights of the local officials.

=== Bimb dynasty ===
The first historical segment of the text describes the events that purportedly happened during 1138-1237 CE.

Prince Pratap Bimb, the brother of Champaner's king Govardhan Bimb, decided to establish his own kingdom by conquering enemy territories. He started his march from Paithan, and led an army against the ruler of Daman. The victory in the ensuing conflict established his control over the coastal region stretching from Chikhli to Tarapur. He then captured the coastal region to the south of Tarapur, establishing his capital at Mahikavati (present-day Mahim village near Kelve in Palghar district). The town was alternatively known as Bimb-sthana ("seat of the Bimb dynasty"), and is now commonly known as Kelve-Mahim.

Pratap Bimb sent his general Balkrishn-rao Somvanshi to conquer the region south of Mahikavati. The general captured the Thane area from the Shilahara king Yashwant-rao, and then seized control of Kalva, Mahd (Madh), Vesave (Versova), Juhu, and Walkeshwar. Pratap Bimb started several projects to make his newly-captured territories suitable for agriculture and to increase its population. However, later, he lost most of the conquered territories to enemies, and his rule was confined to the islands of Mumbai and Sashti (Salsette). In this area, he established his second capital, named Mahikavati (present-day Mahim) after his former capital. Under his rule, the formerly barren islands became urban and prosperous.

After Pratap Bimb's death, his less notable successors ruled the region for around 50 years. Keshavdev, the last king of the Bimb dynasty, died heirless. His ministers and the elite landowners of the region then appointed the Chief Minister Janardan as the next ruler.

=== Nagar-shah and Yadava rule ===
The second historical segment of the text describes the events that purportedly happened from mid-13th century to 1332 CE.

Janardan's short reign ended when Nagar-shah, the Vaishya ruler of Ghandivi (Gandevi), captured the former Bimb territory. Nagar-shah offered the post of Chief Minister to Janardan. At the time of this conquest, Nagar-shah was heirless, and three of his close relatives expected to be rewarded with control of the newly-conquered territory for their good performance in the military campaign. However, after some time, a son named Tripurkumur was born to Nagar-shah, and was expected to succeed his father as the ruler of the kingdom. Concerned about their losing their reward, the three relatives demanded control of three villages - Malad, Marol and Thane. When Nagar-shah refused their demand, they allied with the imperial Yadavas of Devagiri. The Yadava king Ramdev-rao (or Ramdev-raya), supported by the three relatives, launched an unsuccessful attack against Nagar-shah.

Keshavacharya states that Ramdev-rao's reign saw killing and harassment of Brahmins, because of which Bramha incarnated as a mleccha and Gopal - the deity of the Yadava clan - became associated with the mlecchas. He narrates the following story about the rise of the Muslim rule: Vital-das, a leading merchant (nagar-seth) of Dwarka, was childless. On advice of religious leaders, he decided to build a temple of Soma-yaga and Thakurji to beget a child. The religious leaders predicted that a mleccha boy born in Delhi would become a king and destroy the temple. Vital-das visited Delhi and met the boy's mother at their hut. The mother told him to meet the boy at the cow-shed, where auspicious signs convinced him that the boy would become a king (Chatra-pati) in future. Vital-das told the boy about the prediction, and sought his promise to not destroy the temple. The boy agreed, and asked Vital-das to ensure that the temple's top resembled a mosque. The boy then gave him a letter instructing the later Muslim kings to spare the temple. Vital-das gave the boy some money, returned to Dwarka, and commissioned a temple there. When the boy returned home and counted the money, it had increased to 800,000. Sometime later, he captured Delhi with an army of 5,000 soldiers and killed the former ruler of Delhi in a battle. He became the new king of Delhi, and was succeeded by his son Ala-ud-din. Ala-ud-din invaded the Yadava kingdom, and suffered critical losses at the beginning of the battle. But with the blessings of the god Harihara, he killed Ramdev-rao and won the battle.

Ramdev-rao's son Keshavdev regained control of the Yadava capital Devagiri. His other son Bimb-dev, the governor of Udgir, launched a military campaign against Ala-ud-din. During this campaign, Bimb-dev reached Konkan, where he defeated several small chiefs. He forced Nagar-shah and his son Tripurkumur to flee, with Tripurkumur escaping to Chaul.

Just like Pratap Bimb, Ramdev-rao's son Bimb-dev ruled the newly-conquered territories from Mahikavati (Mahim), with support of the local elite landowners. Nagar-shah's forces, led by Tripurkumur, defeated the army of Bimb-dev's son Pratap-shah and regained control of the area. Soon after, Ala-ud-din Khalji ended the Yadava rule at Devagiri, thus leaving Nagar-shah firmly in control of the present-day Mumbai area.

=== The Bhagadchuri affair ===
The third historical segment of the text describes the events that purportedly happened during 1332-1379 CE.

Jaitchuri, a foster son of Nagar-shah, received the grant of Versova (Vesave) region as a reward for his bravery. Subsequently, the king made his courageous son Bhagadchuri the in-charge of the Sashti region.

Nika Malik, the wazir (prime minister) of Ala-ud-din, governed northern Konkan as a part of the Delhi Sultanate. He recognized the hereditary rights of several Desalas, and arbitrated between their disputes. He was unable to settle a dispute between Soma (or Somala) Desala (a landholder of Malad) and Papanrut Desala, and sent them to Ala-ud-din's court in Delhi. Ala-ud-din killed both men after a heated argument. Soma's intestines were used as a wick, and his blood was used as oil for a lamp placed under a sacred tree. Later, Ala-ud-din felt remorse for killing an innocent man, and prayed for Soma's son. Meanwhile, Nika Malik appointed Bhagadchuri as the new Desala of Soma's area. The locals did not like this, as Bhagadchuri was outsider to them.

Over the years, Bhagadchuri became corrupt and egoistic, but was too powerful to be subdued by the king. He was a womanizer, and tried to seduce a married woman from the family of Soma Desala. When the woman resisted his advances, he imprisoned her entire family and killed her husband. The woman escaped to Bhiwandi, where she gave birth to a son. When the boy grew up, he and his relatives conspired to kill Bhagadchuri at the Harba-devi fair in Mahd (Madh), with the king's approval. However, Bhagadchuri escaped and a disgruntled minister became his ally. Meanwhile, Delhi had come under the rule of the Tughluq dynasty, and the two men approached a Tughluq official at Vadnagar to help overthrow the Nagar-shah dynasty.

With approval of the emperor Muhammad bin Tughluq, the Tughlaq army captured the Nagar-shah kingdom, killing the defending king and his associates in a battle. The emperor handed over the administration of the former Nagar-shah territory to the rebel faction led by Bhagadchuri. Bhagadchuri executed his opponents, including the descendants of Soma Desala. Such acts made him more unpopular, and a group of dissidents executed him and his brother at the Harba-devi fair. To establish peace in the region, Muhammad bin Tughluq appointed Lahur-shah, the son of the deceased king, as the new administrator of the area, retaining the traditional administrative set-up of the region.

=== Later rulers ===
Subsequently, some local families such as the Nayate and Bhongale ruled over the Mumbai area for a brief period. The Muzaffarids of Gujarat seized control of the area in 1429 CE. The text mentions that Maharaja-Rajadhiraj Sultan Bahadur Shah alias Khan-saheb arbitrated disputes between the Desalas based on the local genealogies.

The Muzaffarids ruled the region until 1534 CE, when the Portuguese gained control of the coastal region between Dahanu to Uran. The text does not mention any instance of religious persecution of Hindus by the Muslim rulers, but mentions such persecution of Indians of different faiths by the Portuguese (firangis).

== Historical reliability ==
The text contains inaccuracies regarding historical events, and its authenticity is debated among scholars. According to the text, seven dynasties ruled northern Konkan during 1128-1539 CE: the Bimbs, the Nagar-shahs, the Yadavas (including Bimb Dev), the Nayates, the Maliks of Delhi (Delhi Sultans), and the Maliks of Ahmedabad (Muzaffarids). However, its description of the smaller dynasties, especially those of the early period, is not corroborated by archaeological, epigraphic or numismatic evidence.

Dipesh Karmarkar (2012) mentions a raj-mudra (royal seal) attributed to Keshavdev. In 2016, the Salsette Explorations Project Team discovered a 1368 CE inscription issued by king Hambīrarāo (Hambir Rao) at Deonar in Mumbai, within the BARC premises. This inscription mentions the place "Konkan-Bimbasthana". According to journalist-archaeologist Vinayak Parab, the king belonged to the Bimba dynasty and was a vassal of the Delhi Sultanate. As of 2023, five inscriptions issued by Hambīrarāo have been discovered, all in Konkan region stretching from Deonar in the north to Nandgaon (Raigad district) in the south.

According to Rajwade, the text is authentic when it comes to geography: it mentions names of 396 places, 336 of which are located in the northern Konkan region.
