= Shiv Smarak =

Shivaji memorial in Mumbai, India

Chhatrapati Shivaji Maharaj Smarak
- छत्रपती शिवाजी महाराज स्मारक
- Interactive map of Chhatrapati Shivaji Maharaj Smarak
- Location: Arabian Sea, Mumbai, India
- Coordinates: 18.9274°N 72.7910°E
- Designer: Ram V. Sutar
- Type: Statue
- Material: Steel framing, reinforced concrete
- Height: 212 metres (696 ft) Total height including pedestal
- Beginning date: 24 December 2016; 9 years ago
- Opening date: TBD
- Dedicated to: Chhatrapati Shivaji Maharaj
- Website: Official website

Proposed location of Shiv Smarak in Back Bay

The Chhatrapati Shivaji Maharaj Smarak or Chhatrapati Shivaji Maharaj Memorial is a proposed monument of Shivaji, the founder of the Maratha Empire. The statue will be located in Mumbai's Back Bay. As of February 2025, construction of the monument has not yet started despite being expected to be completed by October 2022.

== History ==
The idea of the Shiv Smarak was conceived in 2004 by the Congress-NCP coalition government. The election of the BJP-Shiv Sena coalition in the 2014 Maharashtra Legislative Assembly election saw the project's budget increase from Rs 100 crores to 3,800 crores in 2016 before being cut down to 2,500 crores in 2018.

On 24 December 2016, for a foundation-stone laying ceremony by Prime Minister Narendra Modi, volunteers collected water from various rivers in the state and soil from Shivaji's forts. Egis in India, a local arm of the French engineering company Egis Group was appointed the Project Management Consultant.

On 1 March 2018, a Letter of Acceptance was issued to the contracting firm Larsen & Toubro to begin construction of the project. Initial plans for the project called for the foundation to be built from reclaimed basalt and rubble from the Colaba–SEEPZ metro tunnel. However, due to delays associated with the monument, the rubble is no longer reserved for the monument, and is being transported to quarries for storage.

== Project details ==
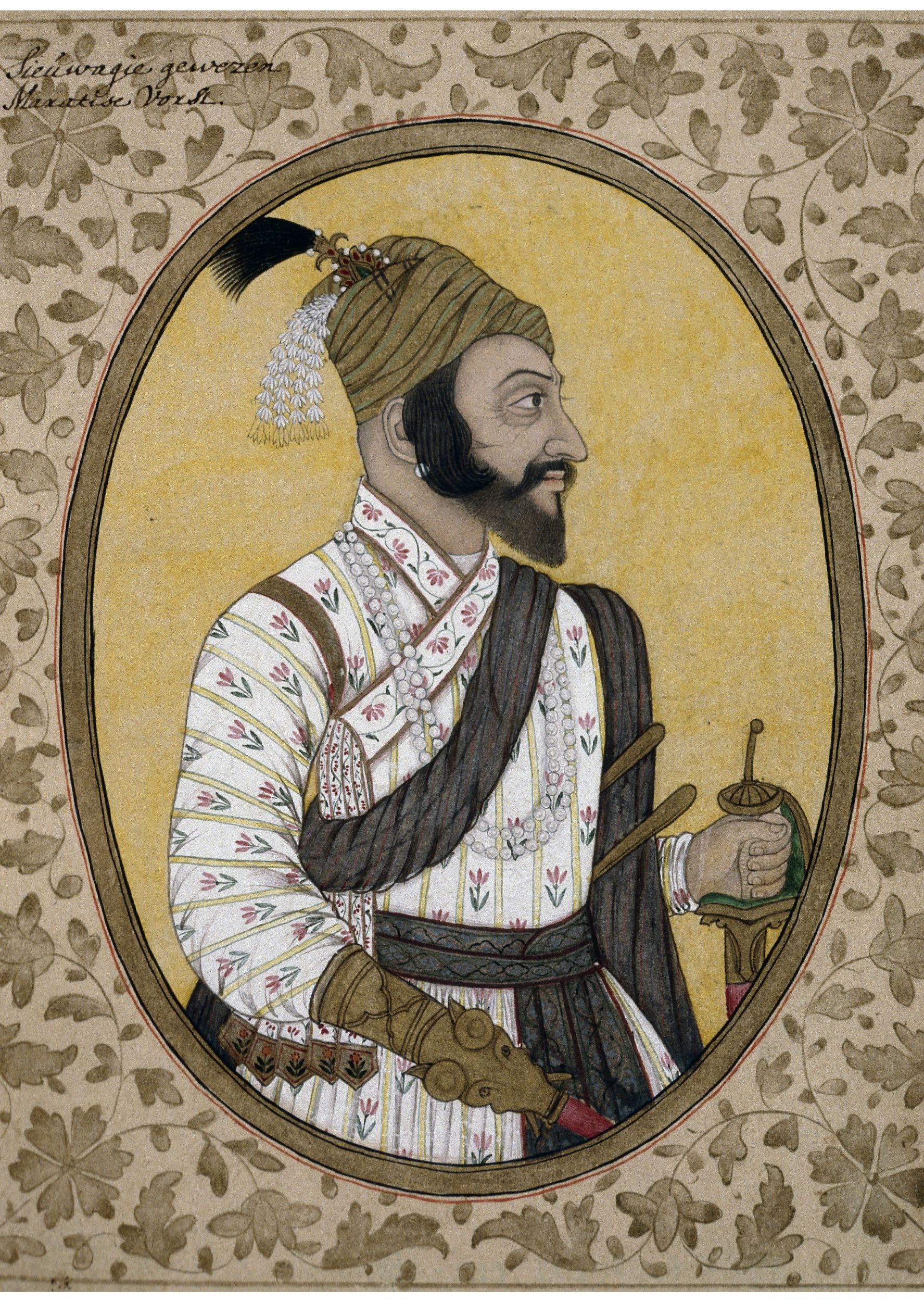
The memorial will be dedicated to Chhatrapati Shivaji Maharaj.

The statue will be located facing Mumbai's Girgaum Chowpatty beach, 1.5 km away on a manmade island of rocks. The statue will be 210 m (690 ft) total height from base of pedestal to tip of sword: 75.7 m (248 ft) statue of horse and rider with a sword 45.5 meters (149 ft) in height, placed on top of a 88.8 m (291 ft) pedestal. Statue was initially planned for 192 metres, however was increased to 212 metres as the state government wanted to keep the statue as the tallest competing against an upcoming statue Spring Temple Buddha in China. The project area is planned to be spread over 130,000 square metres (1,400,000 sq ft). It is expected to be completed in 2021. Initially the total cost of the project was estimated to be about ₹3,643 crore (US$380 million), but cost-reduction measures have resulted in a contract worth 2500 crores.

The completed vision of the project will include visitor centre buildings, a memorial garden, a library, food court, and convention centre with room for approximately 10,000 people. The memorial will also have a museum, exhibition gallery, amphitheater and hospital. The memorial will showcase replicas of Chatrapati Shivaji Maharaj's forts.

== Connectivity ==
The memorial will be reachable by boat jetty, helipad and an extension spur of Mumbai Metro.

Since Mumbai has four rainy months every year which makes access to memorial by boat difficult, a 1.2 km undersea metro rail connection from Cuffe Parade on Mumbai Metro Line 3 option for connecting the Shiv Smarak was finalised after considering various ropeway and metro rail options. This option, with a cost of ₹1,500 crore (US$160 million), will provide all weather connectivity during all 12 months of the year. Earlier, options of another undersea metro rail route from Girgaon Chowpatty, or an aerial ropeway and causeway sea link were also considered before deciding on the shorter Cuffe Parade Metro Link.

== Issues ==
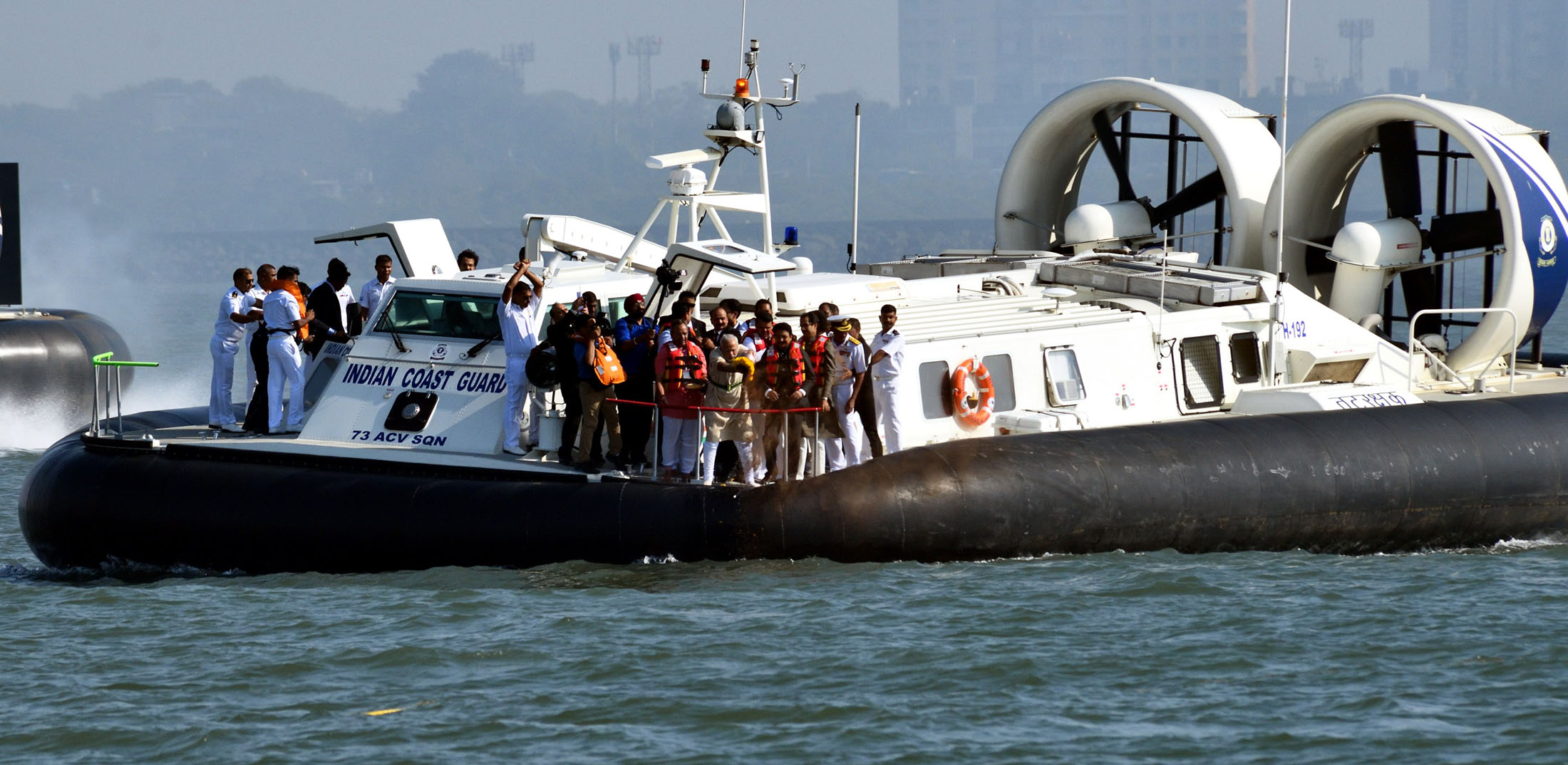
Prime Minister, Narendra Modi performing a Jal Pujan ritual, asking the deities to bless the location of the future statue. 24 December 2016.

Maharashtra Navnirman Sena president Raj Thackeray had suggested in 2016 that the money could be better utilised for the development and maintenance of the Shivaji's forts and palaces in Maharashtra, many built during the reign of Shivaji maharaj.

The Koli fishing community staged protests in 2017 and expressed their fear that they will lose their livelihood.

== Status ==
In February 2021, the detailed project report from Maharashtra state Public Works Department (PWD) and the environment clearance from the Ministry of Environment, Forest and Climate Change were awaited for the undersea metro rail link from Cuffe Parade to Shiv Smarak.

In August 2021, the project was stalled since January 2019 due to the COVID-19 pandemic, only the bathymetry survey complete while the geotechnical survey was underway. Consequently, state PWD proposed extending project completion date by a year from 18 October 2021 to 18 October 2022.

== See also ==
- List of tallest statues
- List of the tallest statues in India
- List of tourist attractions in Mumbai
- Statue of Equality
- Statue of Ahimsa
- Statue of Unity
- Tourism in Mumbai
