= CP Tank =

Coordinates: 18.954890°N 72.825636°E

CP Tank or Cowasjee Patel Tank is a former water tank for supplying drinking water in Girgaon, South Mumbai.

Although long vanished, the city of Bombay once had many water tanks within its city limits. The tanks were once the only source of water to the city. The tanks were named after philanthropic citizens who donated money to fund the building of these tanks so that the citizens of the city would get a fresh source of drinking water.

The CP Tank was built by Cowasji Rustamjee Patel in 1776. The Framji Cowasji Tank bordered Esplanade was built by Framji Cowasji in 1831.

All that remains of the tank is a plaque on a wall opposite Metro Cinema in Girgaon.

== See also ==
- Girgaum Chowpatti
