= Shivaji's forts =

Chhatrapati Shivaji Maharaj's forts

== Pratapgad Fort ==
Chhatrapati Shivaji Maharaj, founder of Maratha Kingdom in western India in 1664, was well known for his forts. Many, like Panhala Fort and Rajgad, existed before him but others, like Sindhudurg and Pratapgad, were built by him from scratch. Also, the fort of Raigad was built as the place of throne, i.e., the capital, of Maratha Kingdom by Hiroji Indulkar on the orders of the Chhatrapati. This is the place where Shivaji was crowned and today also his Samadhi (tomb) stands in front of the Jagadishwar temple. These forts were central to his kingdom and their remains are among the foremost sources of information about his rule. The French missionary Father Fryer witnessed the fortifications of Gingee, Madras, built by Chhatrapati Shivaji Maharaj after its conquest, and appreciated his technical know-how and knowledge.

Sindhudurg was built in order to control attacks by Portuguese and Siddis on the coastal areas of the Maratha Kingdom. This fort is the witness of the Maratha Navy which was later led by Kanhoji Angre in times of Chhatrapati Shivaji Maharaj's grandson Chhatrapati Shahu I, and came to glory. Also, Chhatrapati Shivaji Maharaj built the forts of Colaba and Underi to control the activities of the Siddis in the Arabian Sea. At the time of Underi's construction, the British opposed a lot and stood with their warships in the sea to obstacle the material being supplied for the construction of the fort. But to their surprise, the material required for construction was being supplied with the help of small boats at night.

The hill fort of Salher in Nashik district was at a distance of 1,200 km (750 mi) from the hill fort Gingee, near Chennai. Over such long distance, hill forts were supported by seaforts. The seafort, Kolaba Fort, near Mumbai, was at a distance of 500 km (310 mi) from the seafort Sindhudurg. All of these forts were put under a havaldar with a strong garrison. Strict discipline was followed. These forts proved useful during Mughal-Maratha Wars.

Notable features of Chhatrapati Shivaji Maharaj's forts include:

- Design changes with the topography and in harmony of the contour, no monotony of design.
- No ornate palaces or dance floors or gardens.
- No temple complexes.
- Sanskritization of fort names.
- Community participation in the defense of forts
- Distinct feature of forts like double line fortification of Pratapgad, citadel of Rajgad.
- Foresight in selection of sites.

== See also ==
- List of forts in Maharashtra
