= Tanks of Mumbai =

Former Water Tanks in Bombay

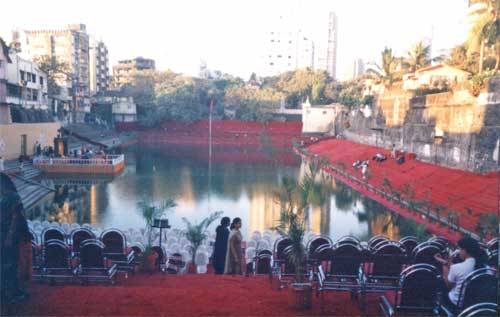
Banganga Tank during the Banganga Festival

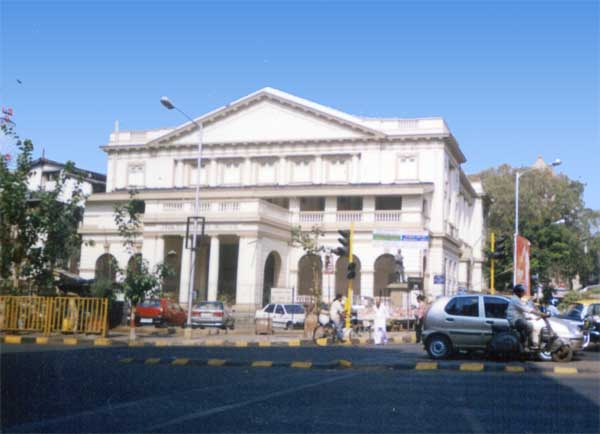
The Framjee Cowasjee hall is built over the Framjee Cowasjee tank

Although the tanks have long vanished, the city of Bombay (now Mumbai) once had many water tanks within its city limits. They were once the only source of water to the city. The only testimony to their existence is the names of the roads in their vicinity, which befuddles many citizens as to the original location to these mystifying relics of the past.

The oldest tank was the Cowasjee Patel Tank built in 1775, which was built by the Parsee Cowasjee Patel. A total of ten tanks were built between the eighteenth and nineteenth century. The tanks were named after philanthropic citizens who donated money to fund the building of these tanks so that the citizens of the city would get a fresh source of drinking water. The tanks were:

1. Cowasji Rustamji Patel Tank (CP Tank)
2. Gowalia Tank
3. Khara Tank
4. Two Tanks
5. Babula Tank
6. Nawab Tank
7. Framjee Cowasji Tank
8. Mumbadevi Tank
9. Banganga Tank
10. Bandra Tank

Out of the list only the Banganga Tank and the Bandra Tank are still in existence today.

== Locations ==
The CP Tank was built by Cowasji Rustamjee Patel in the Girgaon vicinity in 1775. The Framji Cowasji Tank bordered Esplanade was built by Framji Cowasji in 1831. All that remains of the tank is a plaque on a wall opposite Metro Cinema in South Mumbai.

The Babula Tank was built near Grant Medical College and the Mumbadevi Tank was constructed by a pious woman named Putlibai. The Banganga Tank has been present since ancient times, said to be from the time of Rama, and is fed by a natural spring although it is only a few decametres from the seashore. The Bandra Tank was built by a rich Kokni Muslim of Village Navpada, and was in use for watering cattle and washing clothes.

== History ==
The tanks were mostly constructed in the crowded areas and were prone to pollution. The scarcity of water was acute at that time and was left to the mercy of the monsoon rains. According to the Bombay City Gazetteer published in 1909, these tanks were often very low and had to be replenished by sinking new wells.

In 1846, the city faced an acute water shortage following which Framji Cowasji sank three wells in its gardens to provide water by steam machinery. Later in 1856, the city faced a severe drought, and an edict was set out relocating all cattle to Mahim, which was the periphery of the city at that time. Thousands would gather daily around the tank at Esplanade to collect water, while the government brought thousands of water drums from far off distances to empty into wells at Bori Bunder, Chinch Bunder, and Dongri.

After a regular water supply to the city was established from the Vihar and Tulsi lakes, the tanks were declared redundant. They soon became a breeding ground for mosquitoes and consequently were filled in. The famous Gowalia Tank Maidan is on top of the original tank.
