= Hiroji Indulkar =

Indian architect of 17th century

- Occupations: Architect, Maratha officer
- Known for: Building Raigad and Sindhudurg forts.

Hiroji Indulkar was a 17th-century architect under the Maratha king Shivaji. He is credited with building Raigad, the second capital of the Maratha Empire, and the sea fort of Sindhudurg. He was also entrusted with the construction of fort Pratapgad along with Moropant Pingle.

== Life ==
The earlier life of Hiroji is uncertain. Some works by him are known. Such as in 1656, Hiroji and Moropant were entrusted with the construction of the Pratapgad fort by Shivaji. For the navy, Shivaji wanted a strong sea fort which is far away from Siddi's Janjira fort. Therefore, on the order of Shivaji, in 1664 Hiroji built the sea fort of Sindhudurg. In 1674 on the order of Shivaji, Hiroji built Raigad fort the second capital of the Maratha Empire in place of the old Rairi fort.

There are two contemporary records of Hiroji's business and transaction activities:

1. A letter dated back to 9 September 1675 from Pune Archives mentioning Patilki of Kikwi in Pargana Shirwal which was sold to Hiroji Indulkar, is returned to its original holder.
2. A transaction record from 1686 mentions a transaction of 17 Hons under the guarantee of Hiroji Indulkar.

== Legacy ==
It is said that when Shivaji saw the fort of Raigad built by Hiroji, he asked Hiroji what he wanted as a gift. Then Hiroji asked the King to gift him a small tile with the carving of his (Hiroji) name on it, accompanied by a condition, that the tile should be placed at the entrance of Jagadeeshwar Temple so that whenever the King visits the Temple, his foot would touch Hiroji's name and with that, the King will visit the temple daily. The tile mentioning the words "Seveche thayi tatpar, Hiroji Indulkar" (always ready for service, Hiroji Indulkar) can be seen at the footsteps of the entrance of Jagadeeshwar Temple.

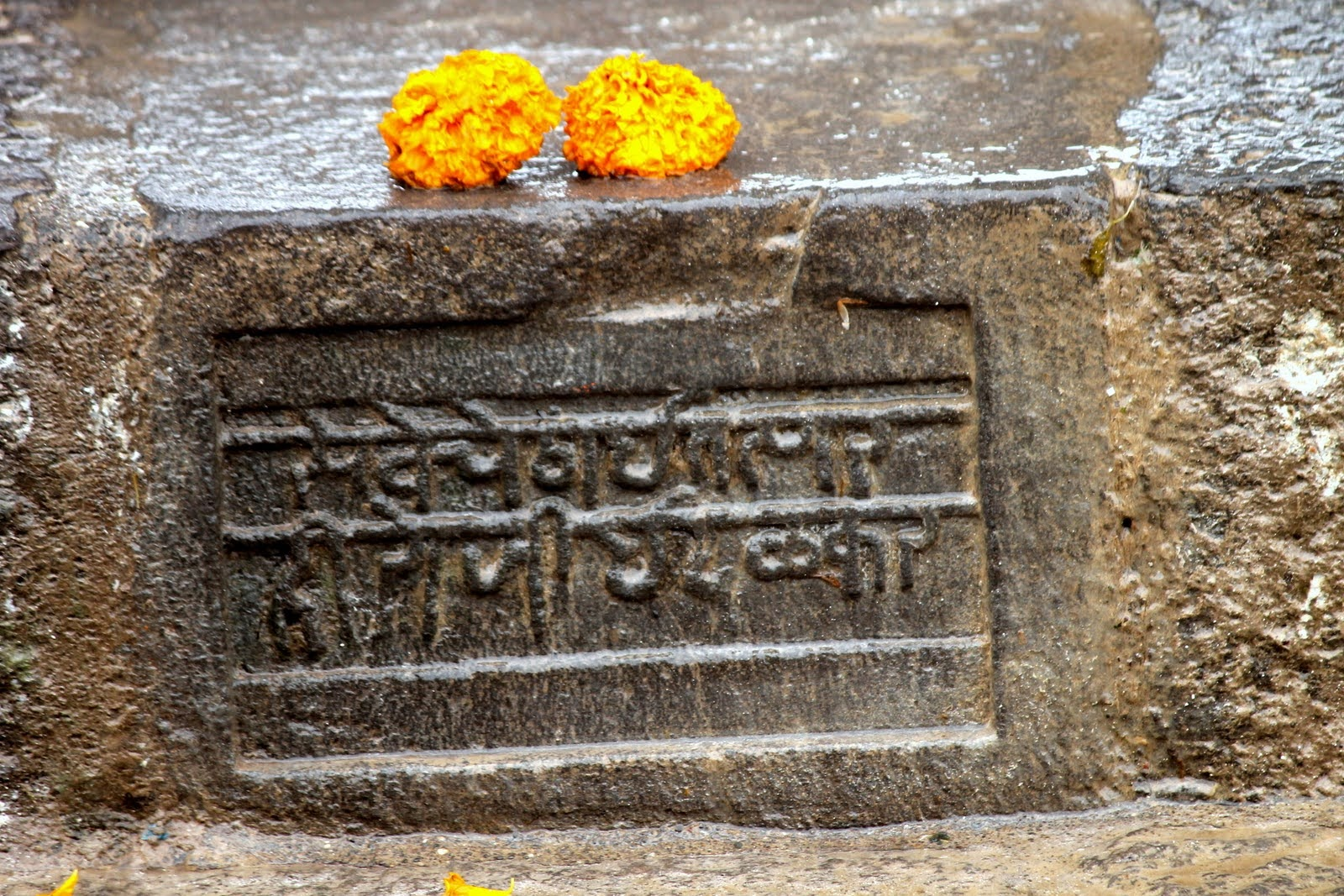
Hiroji Indulkar stone carving

== In popular culture ==
- In movie Farzand, Hiroji Indulkar's role was performed by Rajan Bhise.
