= Raigad Fort =

Hill fort in Maharashtra, India

- Raigad District, Maharashtra (near Mahad)
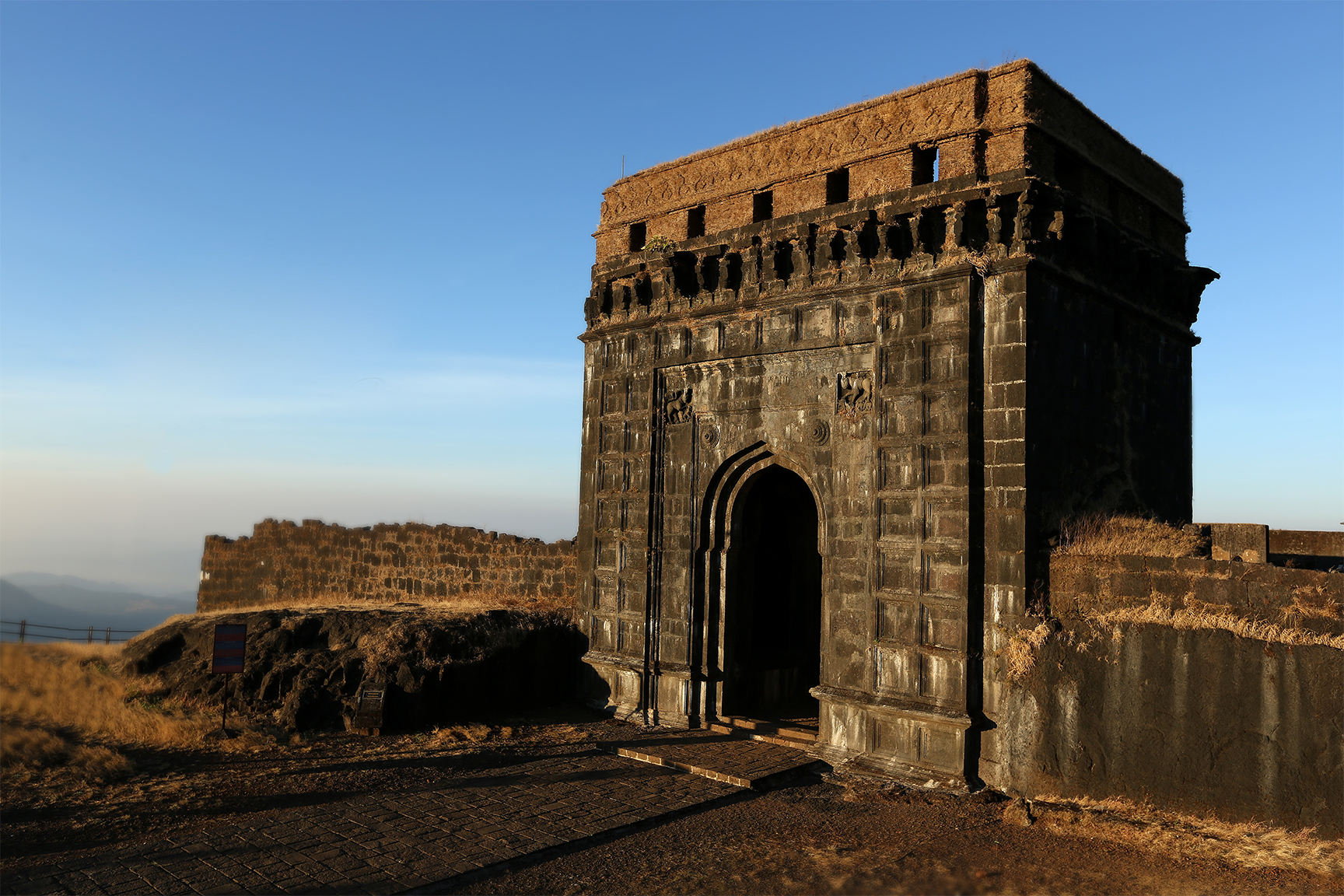
- Nagarkhana, Raigad Fort

Site information
- Type: Hill fort
- Controlled by: Shirke family (before 1656); Maratha Empire (1656–1689; 1739–1818); Mughal Empire (1689–1739); East India Company (1818–1858); British Raj (1858-1947); Government of India (after 1947)
- Open to the public: Yes

Location
- Shown within Maharashtra Raigad Fort (India)
- Coordinates: 18°14′01″N 73°26′26″E
- Height: 820 metres (2,700 ft) ASL

Site history
- Built: Constructed between 1656 to 1674 under Maratha Empire
- Architect: Sardar Hiroji Indulkar
- In use: capital administration and military operations of the Maratha Empire
- Materials: Basalt, Granite, Lime mortar
- Events: Coronation of: Chhatrapati Shivaji Maharaj (6 June 1674); Chhatrapati Sambhaji Maharaj (16 January 1681); Chhatrapati Rajaram Maharaj (11 March 1689)

Garrison information
- Past commanders: Chhatrapati Shivaji; Chhatrapati Sambhaji

UNESCO World Heritage Site
- Part of: Maratha Military Landscapes of India
- Criteria: Cultural: iv, vi
- Reference: 1739-005
- Inscription: 2025 (47th Session)

Raigad, located in the Raigad district of Maharashtra, India, is a hill fort situated near the town of Mahad. It is one of the strongest fortresses on the Deccan Plateau and was historically referred to as Rairee or Rairy Fort. Raigad is the largest fort in Asia, with an area of 1,200 acres.

Chhatrapati Shivaji Maharaj, the Maratha ruler, along with his chief engineer Hiroji Indulkar, oversaw the construction and development of various buildings and structures at the fort. In 1674, following his coronation as king, Chatrapati Shivaji Maharaj chose Raigad as the capital of his Hindavi Swaraj.

Located at an elevation of 820 metres (2,700 ft)above sea level in the Sahyadri mountain range, the fort offers panoramic views of the surrounding region. The fort was home to around 1,550 residents, with an average family size of five. Access to the fort requires ascending approximately 1,737 steps. Alternatively, visitors can use the Raigad Ropeway, an aerial tramway spanning 750 m (2,460 ft) in length and reaching a height of 400 m (1,300 ft), which transports passengers to the fort in approximately four minutes.

== Major features ==
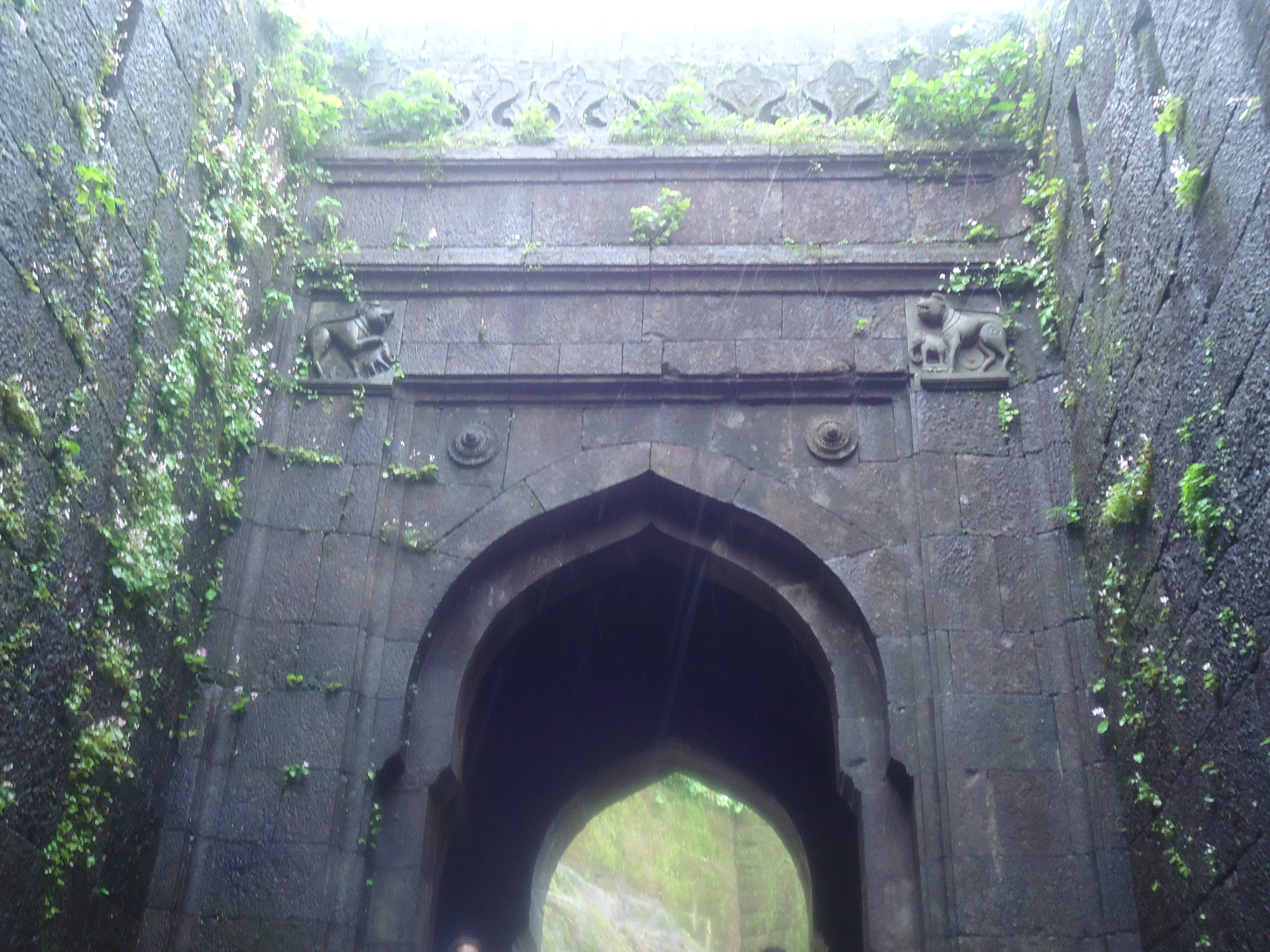
The Maha Darwaja

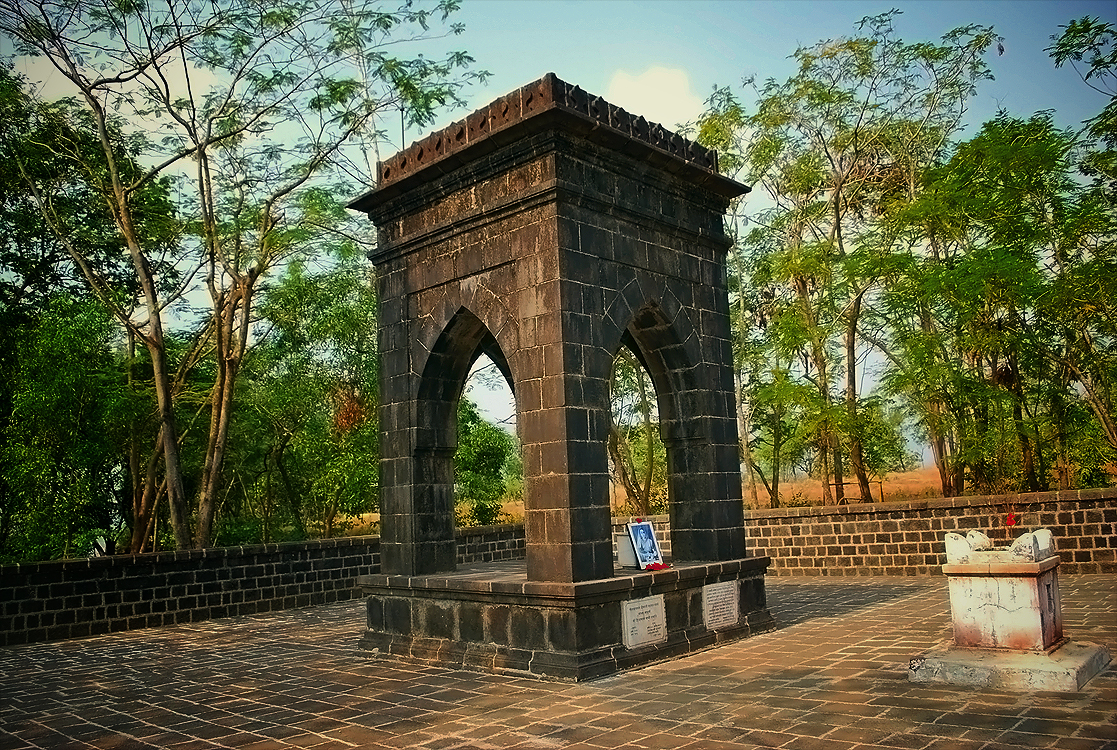
The Samadhi of Rajmata Jijabai

The main palace was constructed of wood, of which only the base pillars remain. The fort ruins include the queen's quarters, and six chambers, each with a private restroom. The chambers lack windows. In front of the palace grounds are the remains of three watchtowers, of which only two survive, as the third was destroyed during a bombardment. The fort also overlooks an artificial lake known as Ganga Sagar Lake.

The primary access route to the fort passes through the “Maha Darwaja” (Great Gate), which was traditionally closed at sunset. The Maha Darwaja is flanked by two bastions, each approximately 20–21 m (65–70 ft) high. The top of the fort rises 180 m (600 ft) above this entrance.

The king's court within Raigad Fort contains a replica of the original throne, which faces the main doorway called the Nagarkhana Darwaja. The throne is oriented towards the east. It was here that Chhatrapati Shivaji Maharaj was crowned. The enclosure was acoustically designed to allow sound to travel from the doorway to the throne.

A secondary entrance, called the Mena Darwaja on the southern side, is believed to have been the private entrance for the royal women and leads to the queen’s quarters. The Palkhi Darwaja on the northern side was used by the king and his entourage. To the right of the Palkhi Darwaja is a row of three deep, dark chambers, which historians believe served as granaries.

The fort overlooks Takmak Tok, a cliff used as an execution site from which condemned prisoners were thrown to their deaths. This area is now fenced off.

A statue of Shivaji is erected in front of the ruins of the main market avenue that leads to the Jagdishwar Mandir, which has Sardar Hiroji Indulkar's name engraved on the first step, his own Samadhi and that of his dog named Waghya. The Samadhi of Rajmata Jijabai, Shivaji's mother, can be seen at the base village of Pachad. Additional attractions of the fort include the Khubladha Buruj, Nane Darwaja and the Hatti Talav (Elephant Lake). Henry Oxienden was on the fort from 13 May to 13 June 1674 & he quoted "We arrived at the top of that strong mountain about sun set, which is fortified by nature more than art, being off very difficult access, and but one advance to it, which is guarded by two narrow gates, and fortified with a strong high wall, and bastions thereto. All the other parte of the mountaine is a direct precipice, so that it is impregnable except the treachery of some in it betrays it. On the Mountain are many strong buildings, as the Raja's Court, and houses for other Ministers of State, to the number of about 300, It is in length about 21 miles and breadth * a mile, but no pleasant trees nor any sort of grains grows thereon. Our house was about a mile from the Raja's Palace, into which we retired with no little content."

=== Hirakani Buruj ===
The fort has a historic buruj called "Hirakani Buruj" (Hirakani Bastion) constructed over a huge steep cliff. The legend goes "that a milkmaid named as Hirakani from a nearby village had come to sell milk to the people living at the fort. She happened to be inside the fort when the gates got closed and locked at sunset. Hearing the cries of her infant son back at the village echo after nightfall, the anxious mother couldn't wait till dawn and courageously climbed down the steep cliff in pitch darkness all for the love of her little one. She later repeated this extraordinary feat in front of Shivaji and was rewarded for her bravery." Noticing that this was a potential loophole, Shivaji built a bastion over the cliff and named it after the milkmaid as Hirakani Buruj.

== Incidents ==
The statue of Chatrapati Shivaji's pet dog was removed by alleged members of the Sambhaji Brigade in July 2012 as a protest but was re-instated by Shivaji Raigad Smarak Samiti, the Archaeological Survey of India, sculptor Rambhau Parkhi and the District Administration.

== Ropeway ==
The "Raigad Ropeway" is a ropeway which provides passenger transportation to the fort. Prior to the ropeway the only way to ascend Raigad fort was to trek to it, which took an hour. The Ropeway makes this site relatively more accessible to those not in a physical condition to make this trek. The Raigad Ropeway project is a non-profit endeavour, being the only one of its kind in India. This facility is owned by the Shri Shivaji Raigad Smarak Mandal, (SSRSM) Pune, an organisation started by Bal Gangadhar Tilak in 1886. Construction of this Ropeway was completed in 1996.

In 1990, the SSRSM was permitted by the government of Maharashtra to construct the ropeway. An offer of Rupees Eighty Million, received from a Central Government firm, from Naini, Allahabad, was considered to be unviable. Subsequently, Jog Engineering Limited offered to execute the project on a Build–operate–transfer basis in 1994, at a cost of INR 31 Million, and the same was accepted by SSRSM.

The construction work commenced in November 1994, and was completed by March 1996. The project was inaugurated by Prof. Rajendra Singh, Sarsanghchalak of the Rashtriya Swayamsevak Sangh. The ascent is 420 m and the rope length is 760 m. The motor capacity is 52.22 kW and the cabin weight is 100 kg each.

=== Ropeway Museum ===
The ropeway project includes a museum which was created by Babasaheb Purandare and Ninad Bedekar.

== Gallery ==
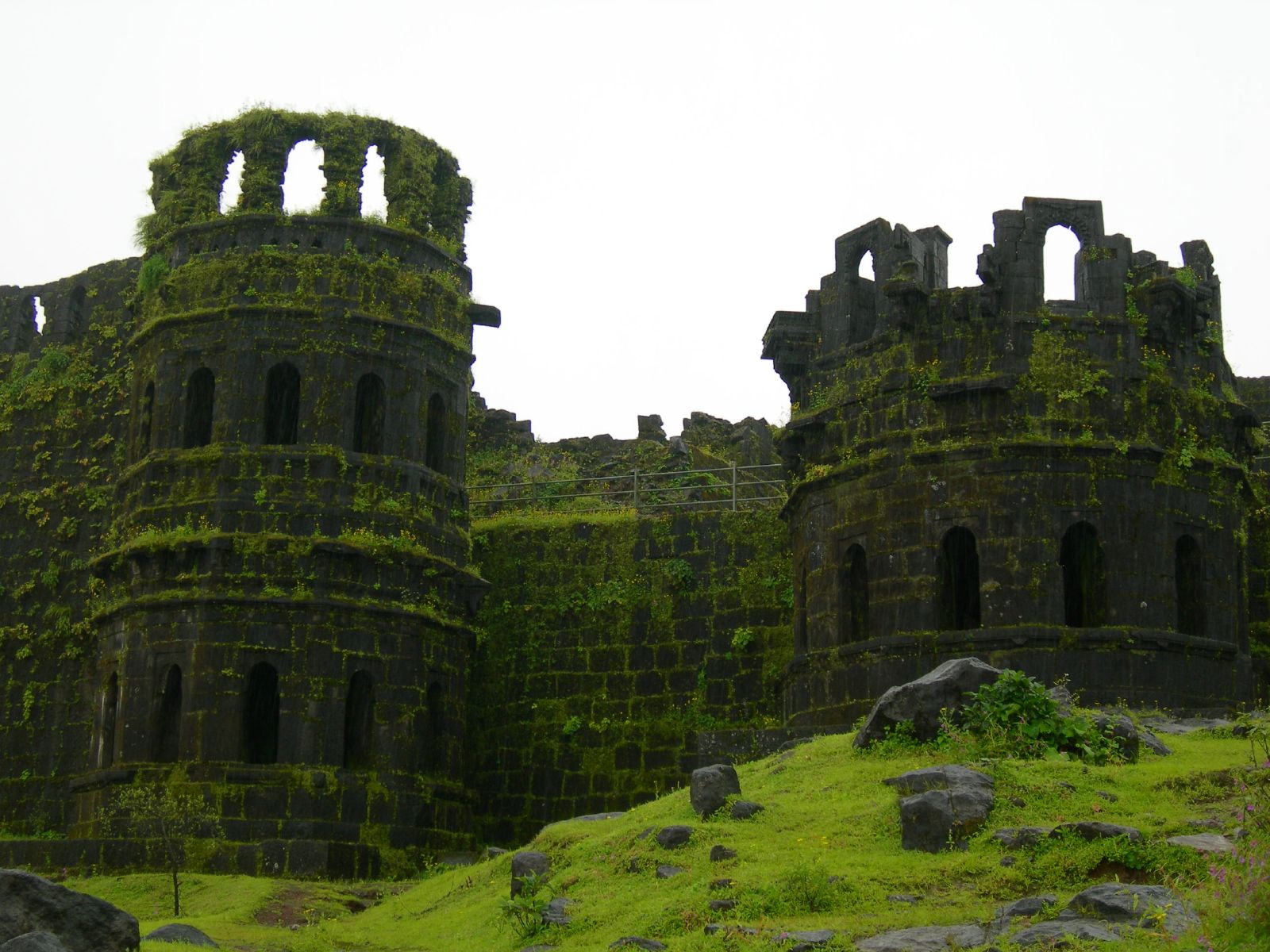
Towers a.k.a. Manore

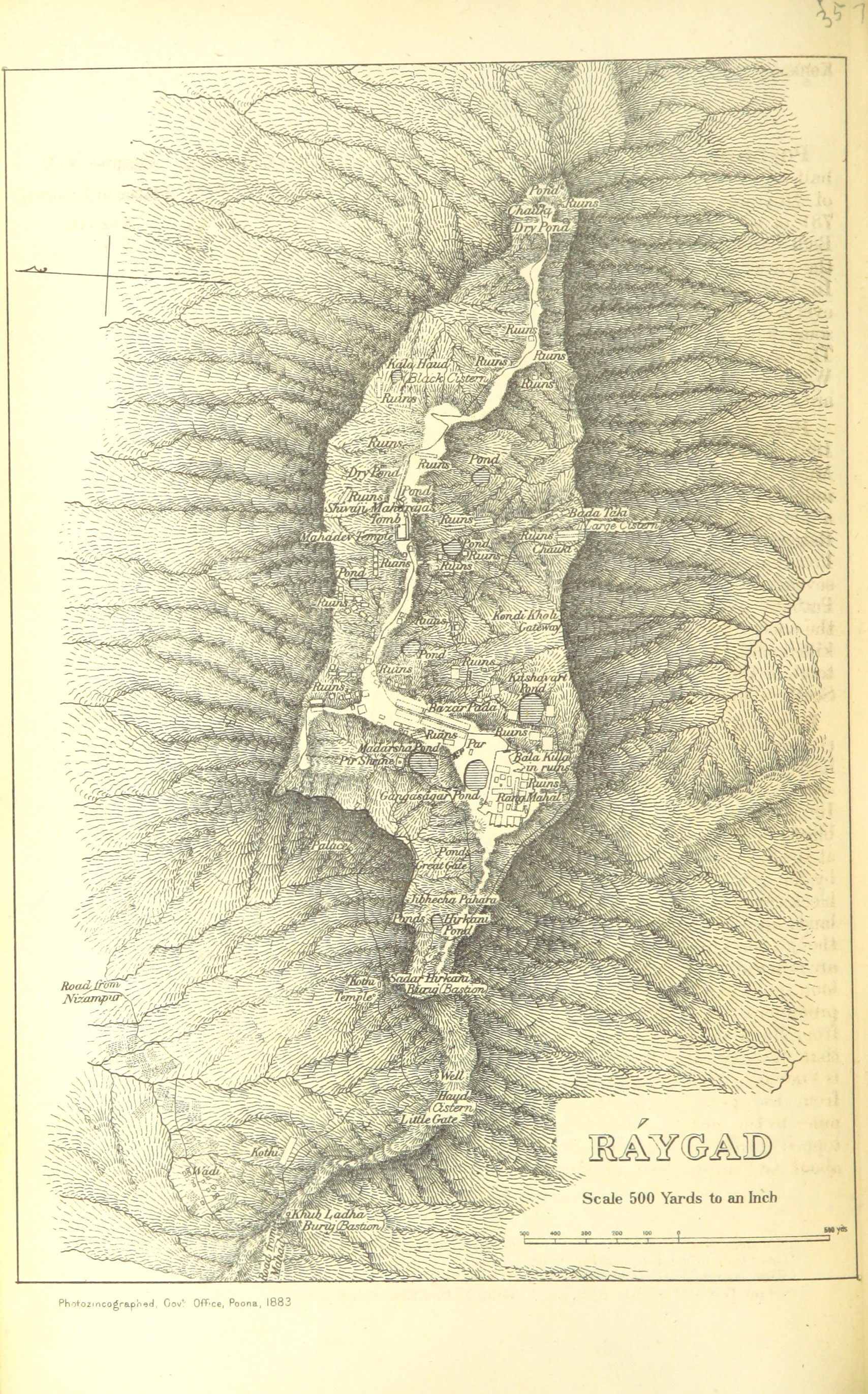
Raigad in 1896

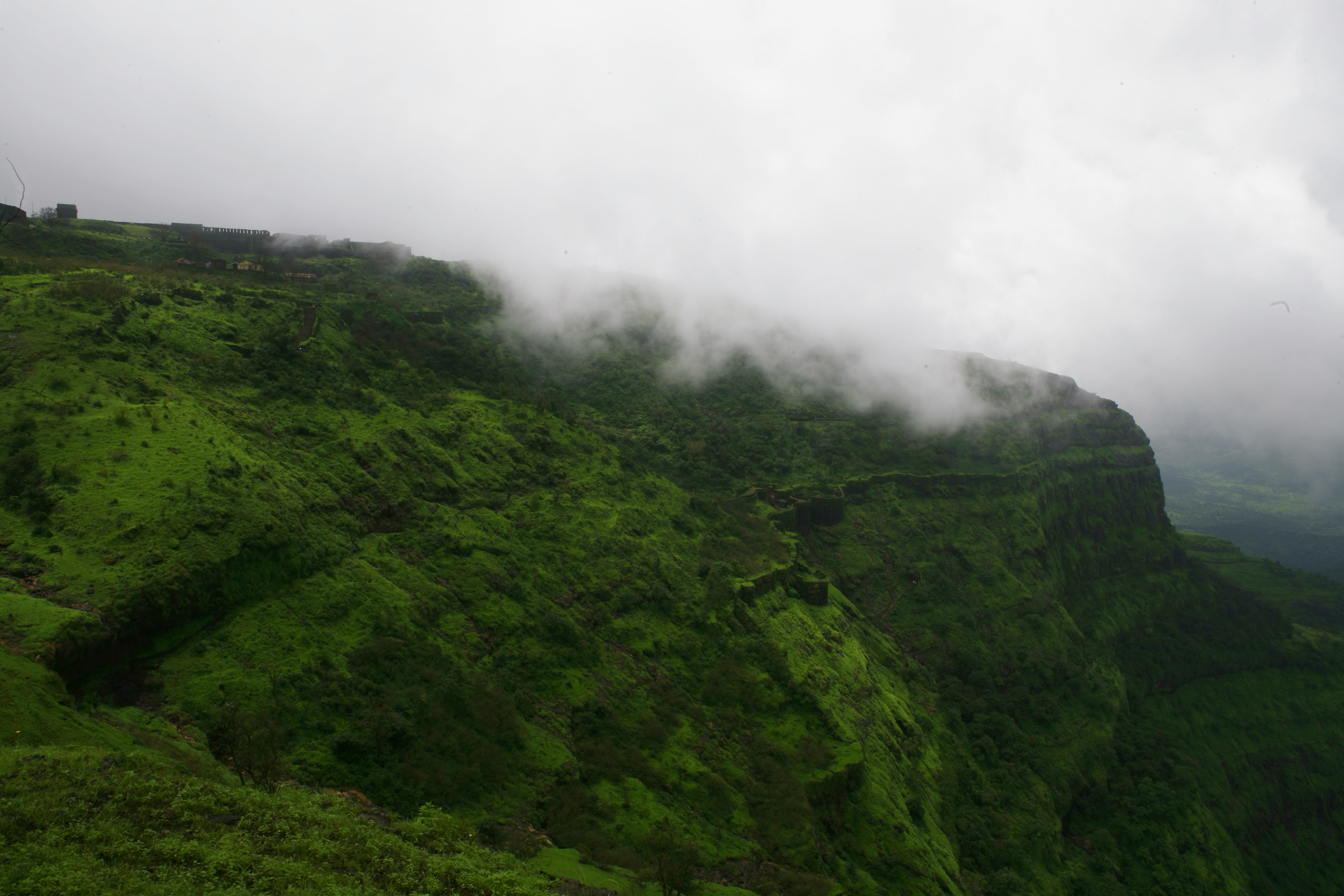
Fortification of the Raigad Fort

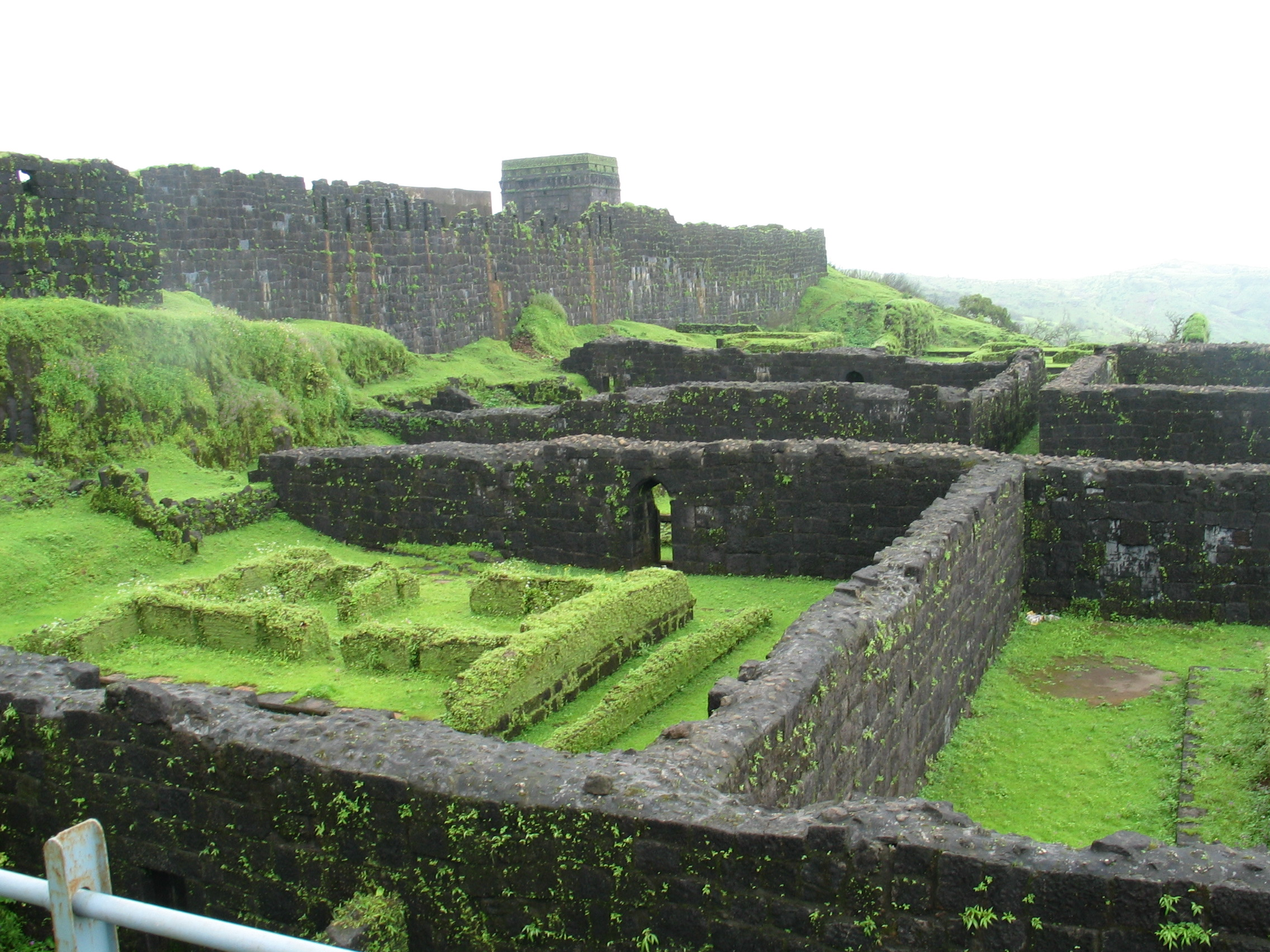
Raigad Fort Palace Ruins

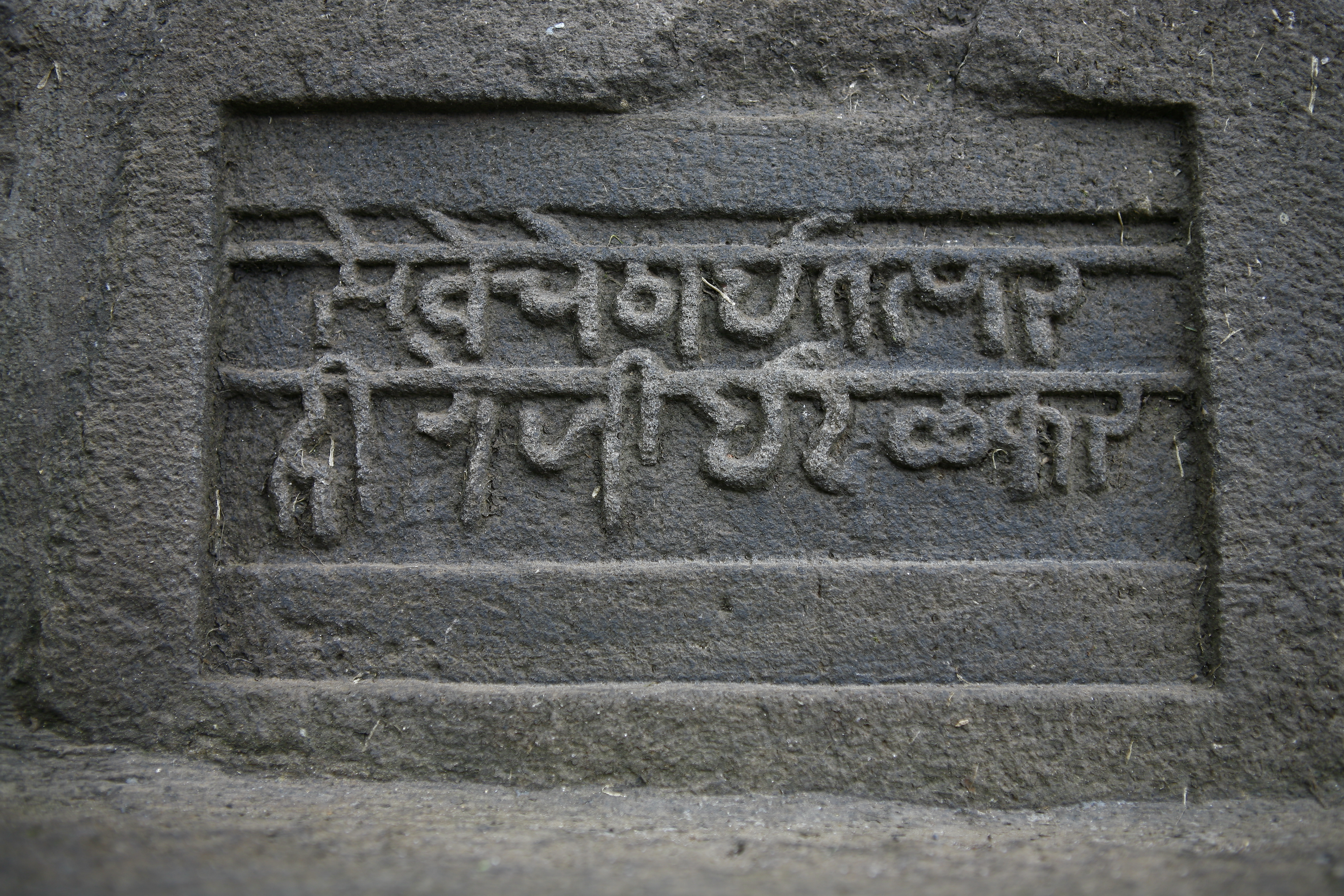
Chief Architect Hiroji Indulkar inscription

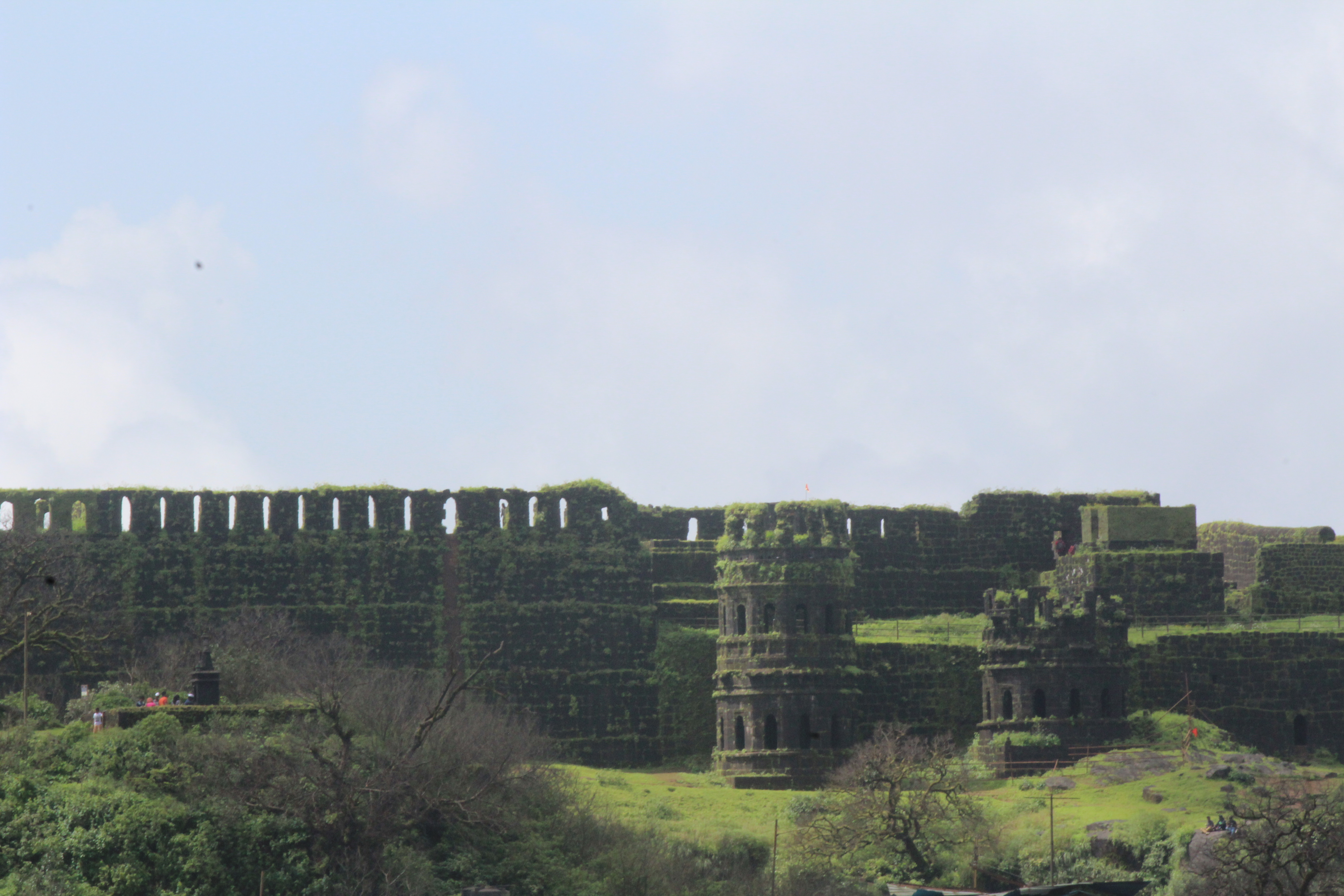
Manore view

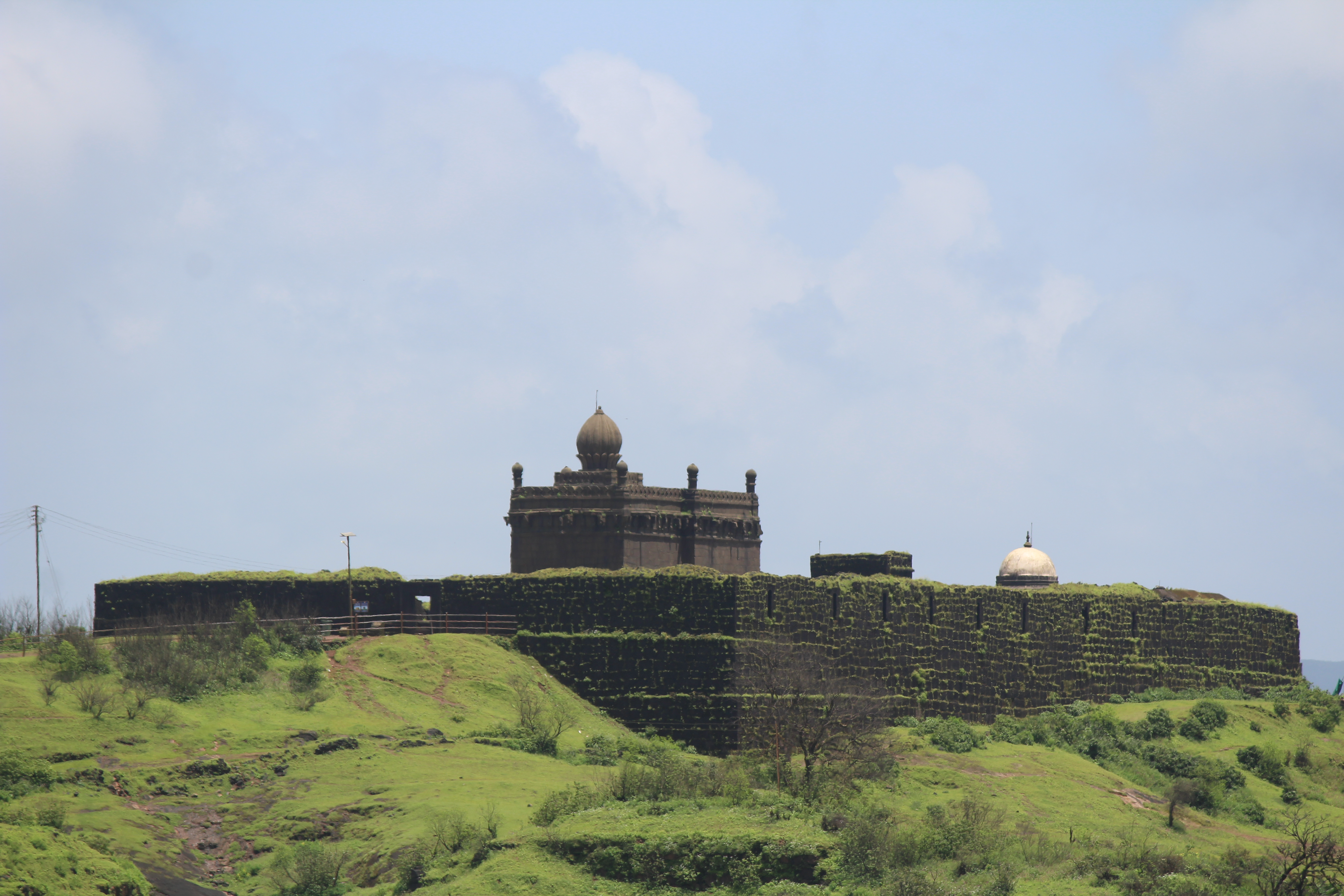
Jagdishwar temple

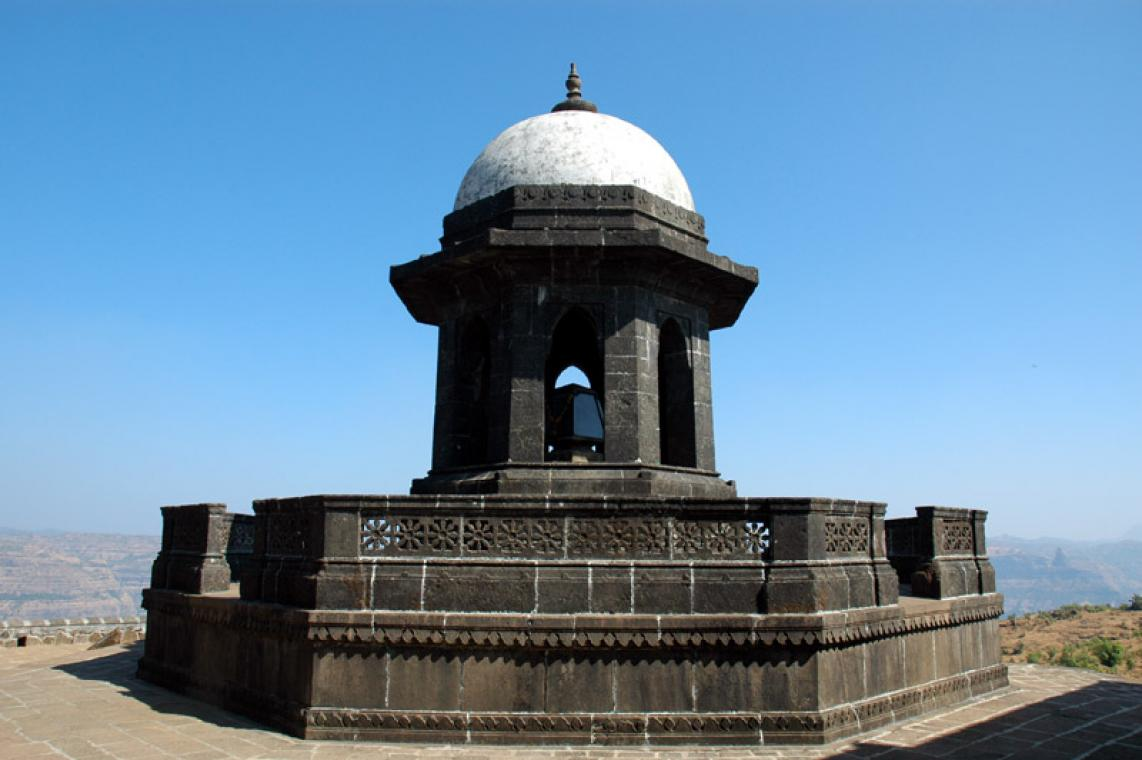
Chhatrapati Shivaji Maharaj Samadhi (memorial)

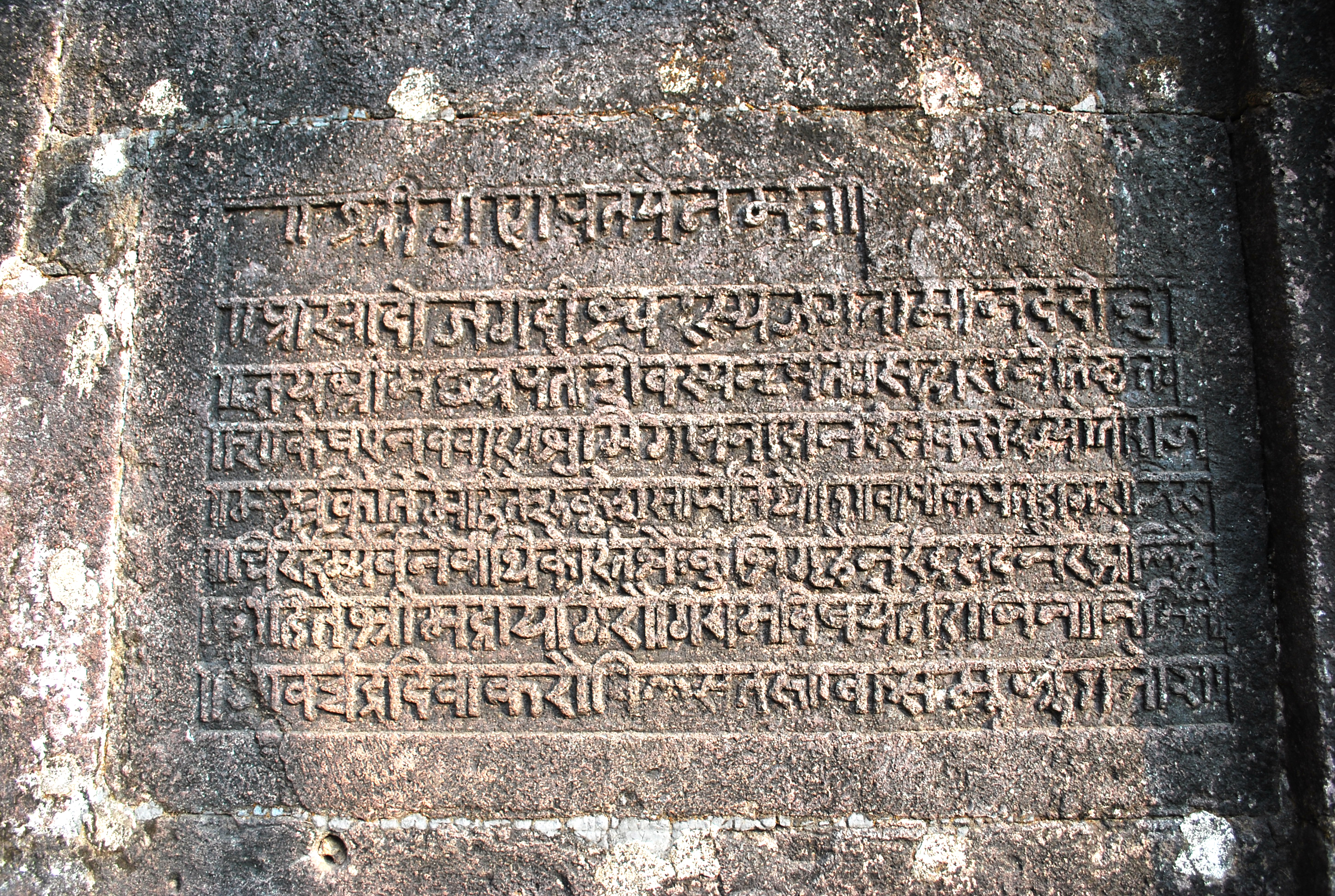
Inscription at Jagdishwar temple

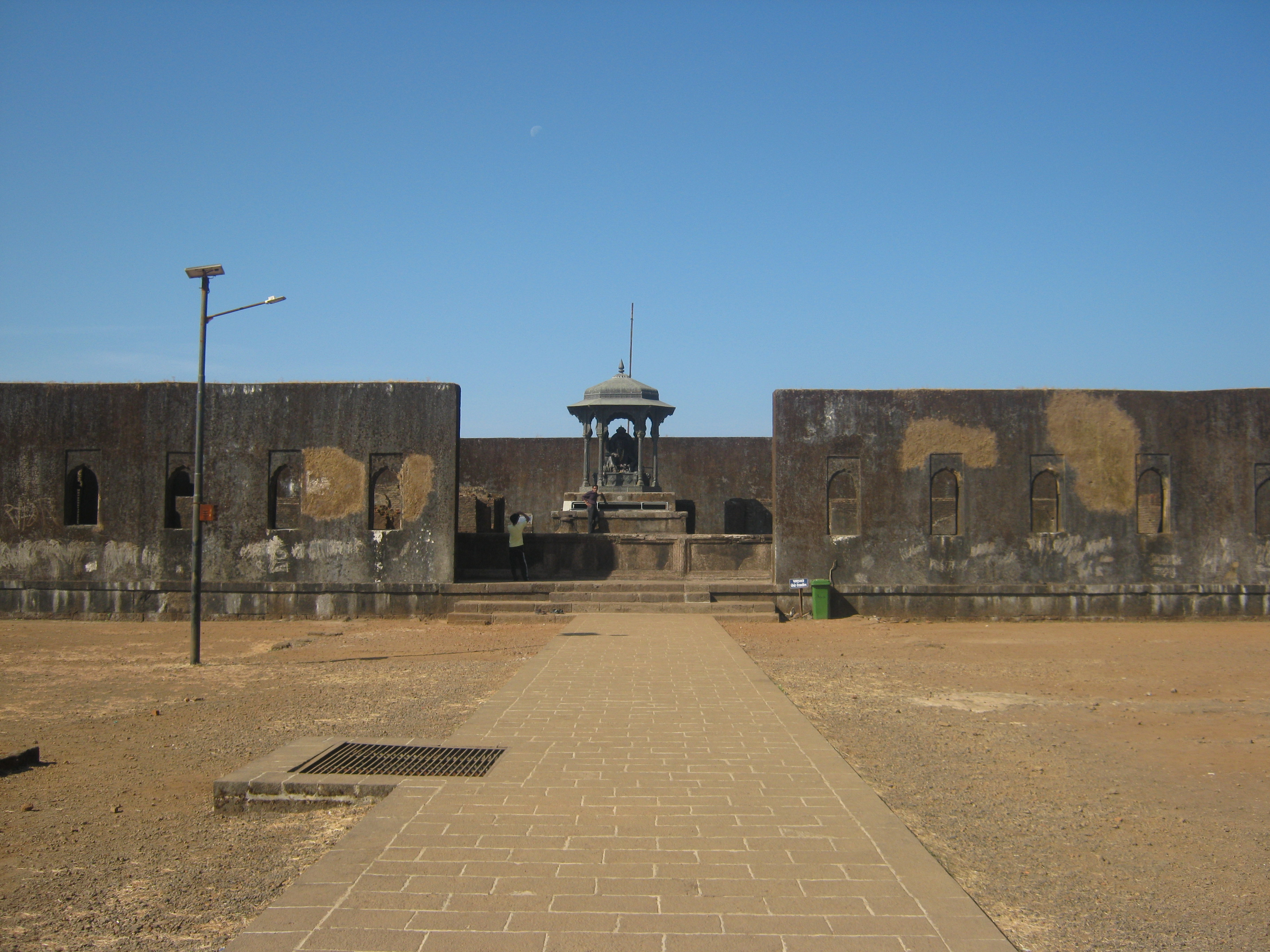
Rajsadar of Raigad fort

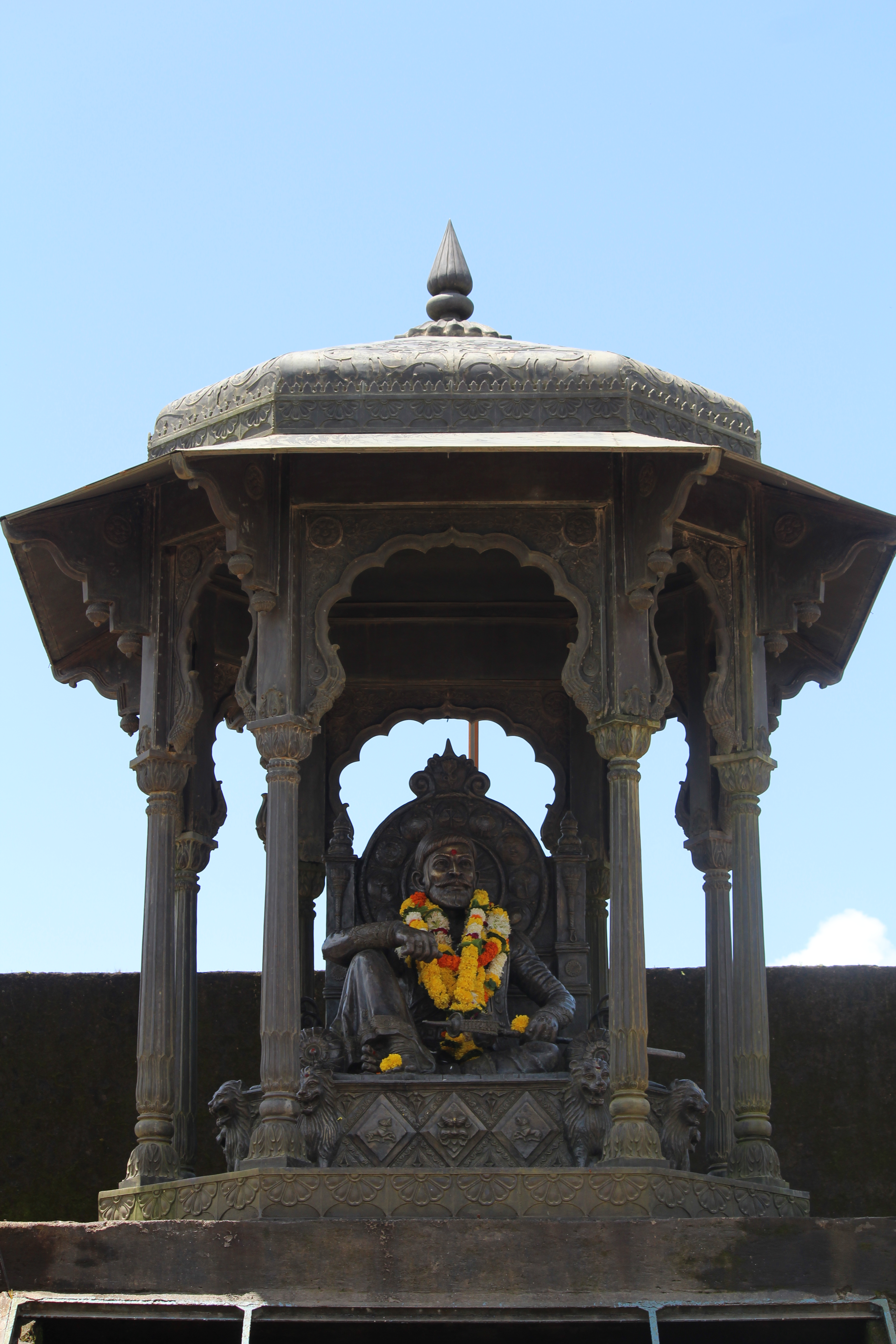
Throne of Maratha Empire (Meghdambri/ Sinhasan)

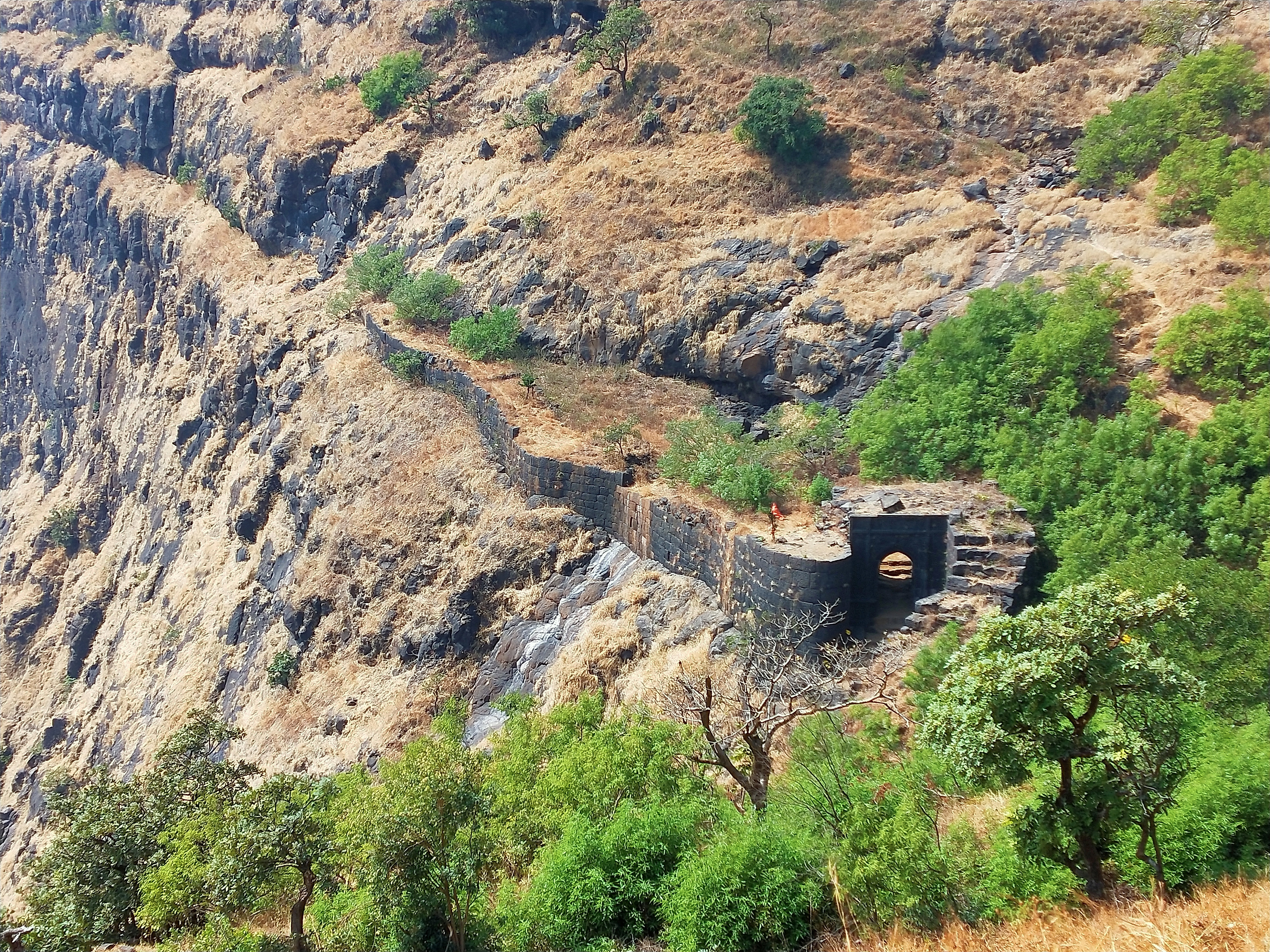
Wagh Darwaza

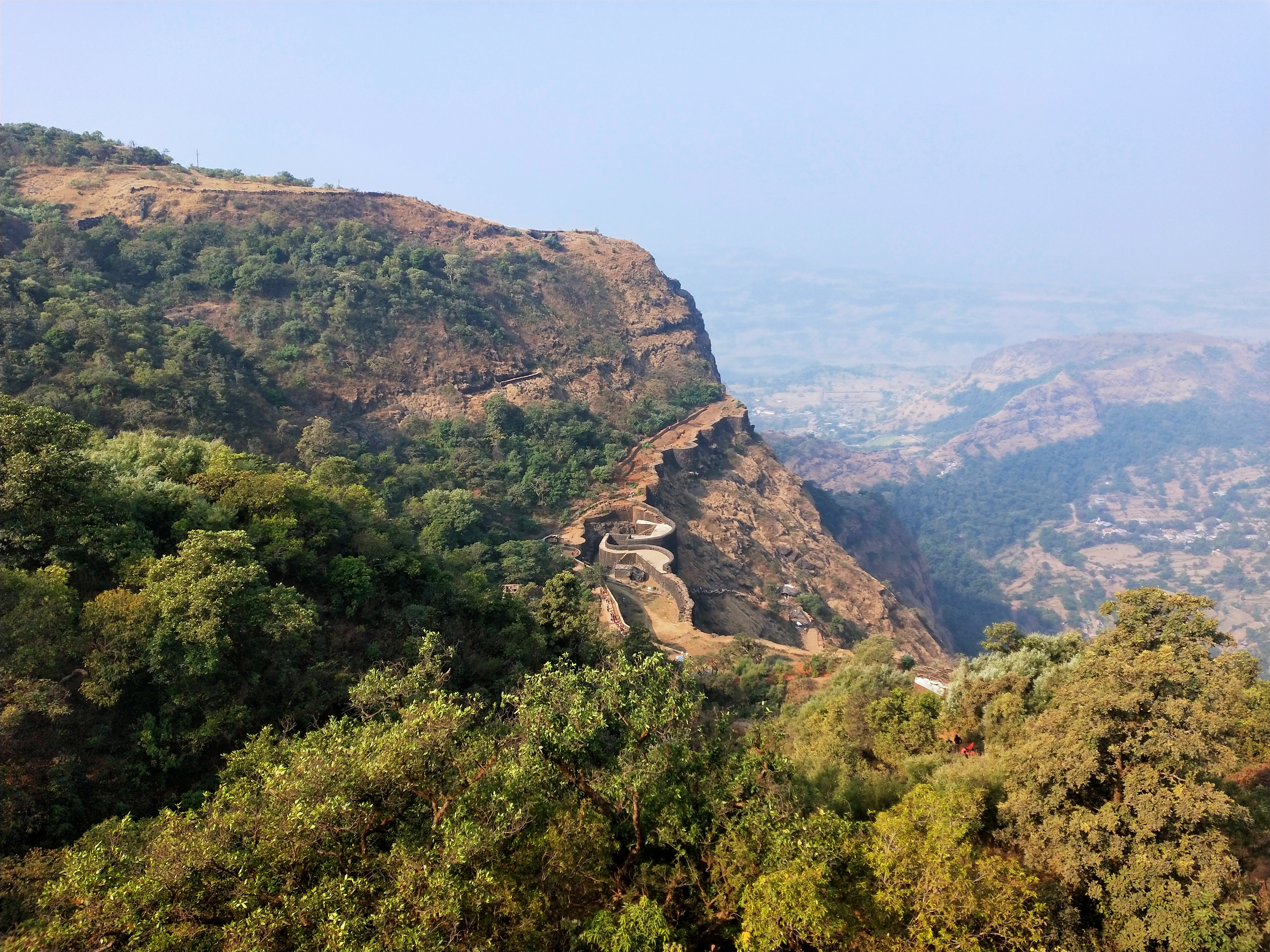
Mahadarwaza and fortification

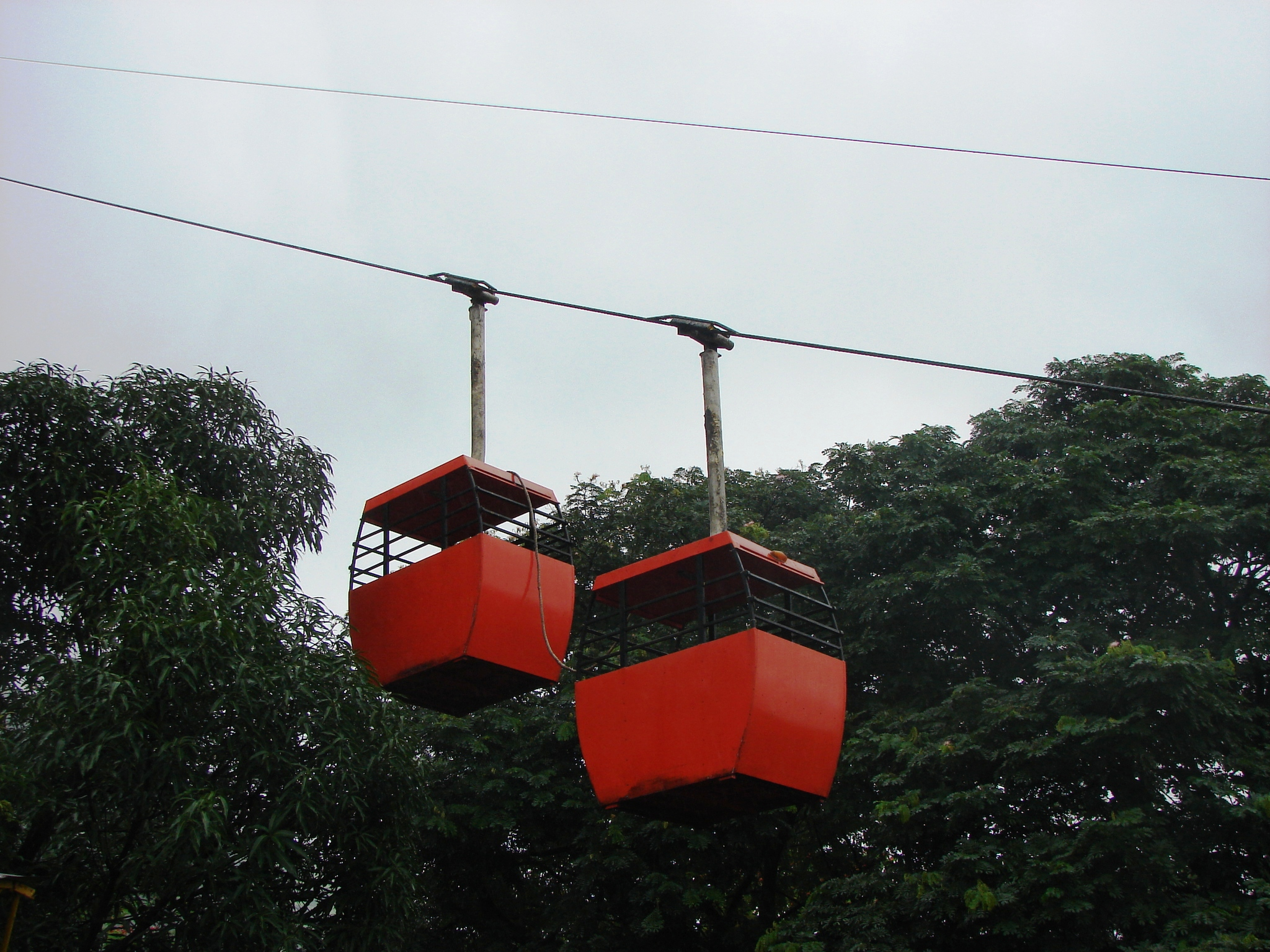
Raigad Ropeway trolleys

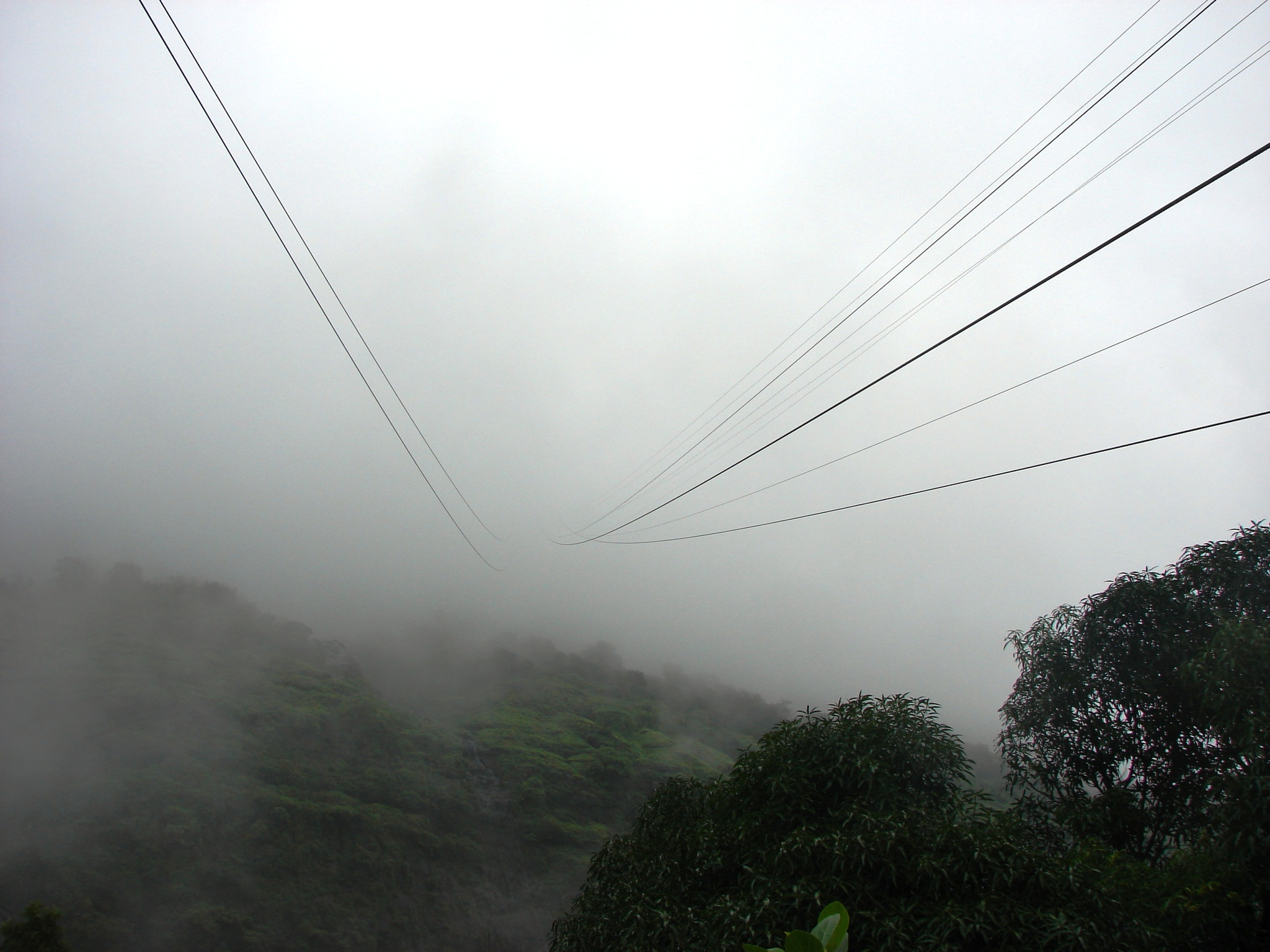
Raigad Ropeway ropes

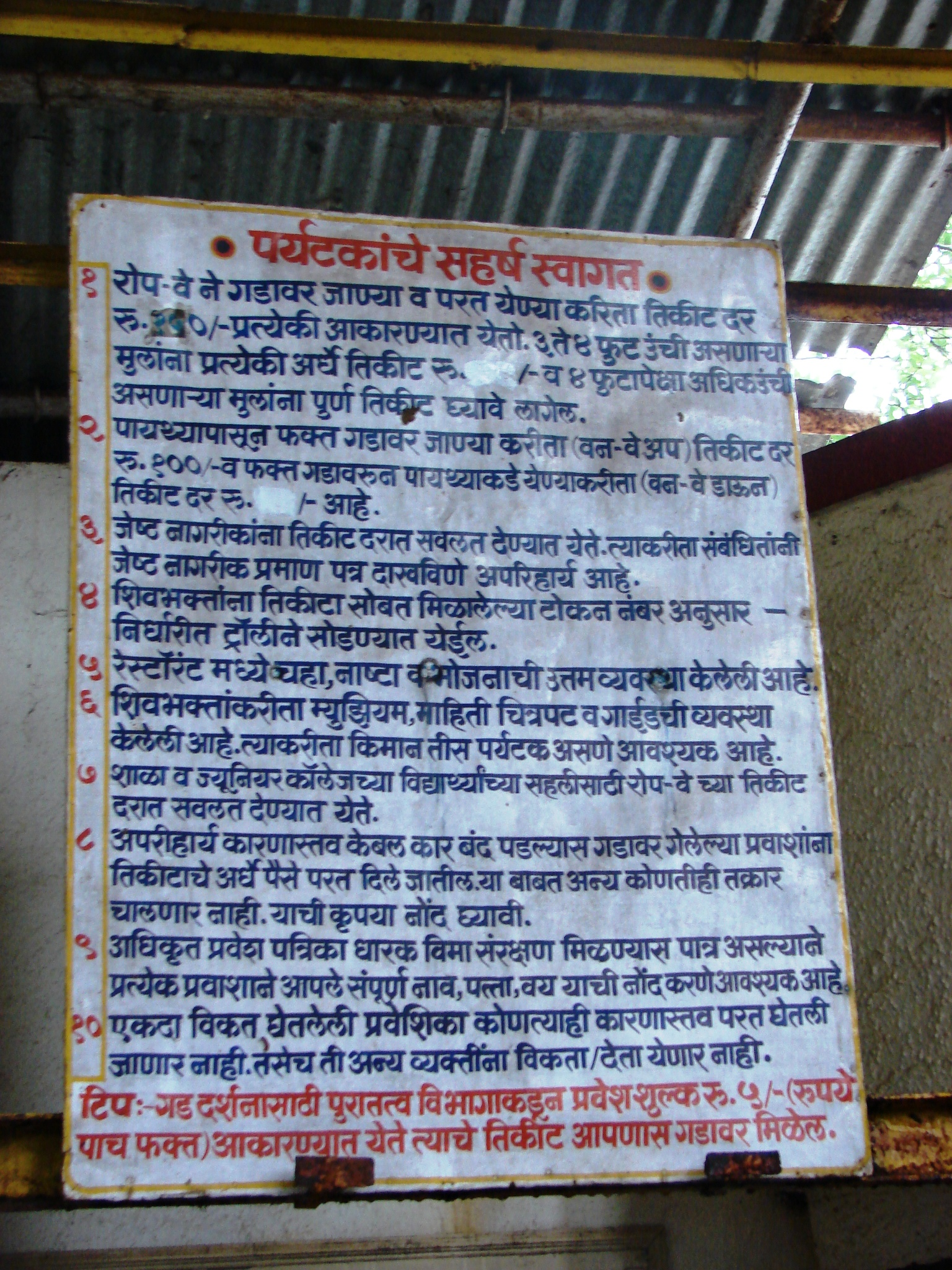
Raigad Ropeway Information in Marathi

== In popular culture ==
Many scenes of web series 'The secret of the Shiledars' were shot at Raigad Fort. Some scenes of the 2025 Hindi film Chhaava were shot on-location at Raigad.

== See also ==
- List of forts in Maharashtra
- Mughal–Maratha Wars
- List of battles involving the Maratha Confederacy
- Rajgad fort (first capital of Maratha Empire)
