= Girgaon =

Girgaon Girgav
- Neighbourhood
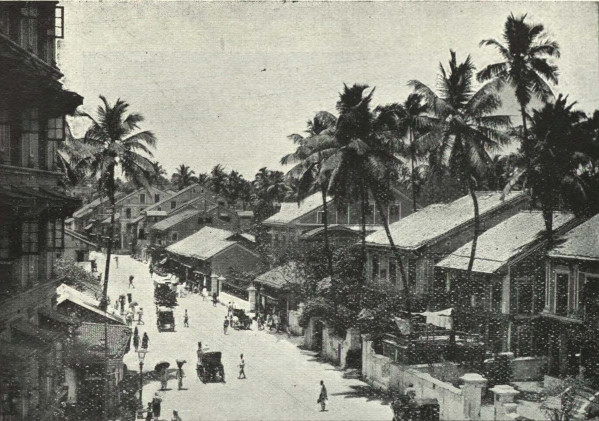
- Girgaon back road, c. 1905

- Location within Mumbai
- Coordinates: 18.953°N 72.813°E
- Country: India
- State: Maharashtra
- District: Mumbai City
- City: Mumbai

Government
  - Type: Municipal Corporation
  - Body: Brihanmumbai Municipal Corporation (MCGM)
- Elevation: 12 m (39 ft)
- Demonym: Girgaonkar

Languages
  - Official: Marathi
- Time zone: UTC+5:30 (IST)
- PIN: 400004

Girgaon, or Girgaum, is an area in southern Mumbai in Maharashtra, India. It is near the coast. A section of Marine Drive is located here.

== Culture ==
- Girgaon Chowpatty: a public beach.

== Notable Buildings ==
- Saifee Hospital
- Royal Opera House

== Entertainment and Attractions ==
- Girgaon Chowpatty
- Marine Drive

== Transport ==
Girgaon is well connected by the :

- Charni Road Railway station on the Western line
- upcoming Girgaon Metro station on the Aqua Line( Line 3).
- The Chhatrapati Sambhaji Maharaj Coastal Road, which starts near Girgaon Chowpatty

== See also ==
- Girgaum Chowpatti
- Tanks of Bombay
- Marine Drive
