= Girgaon Chowpatty =

Girgaon Chowpatty Girgaum Chowpatty
- Neighbourhood
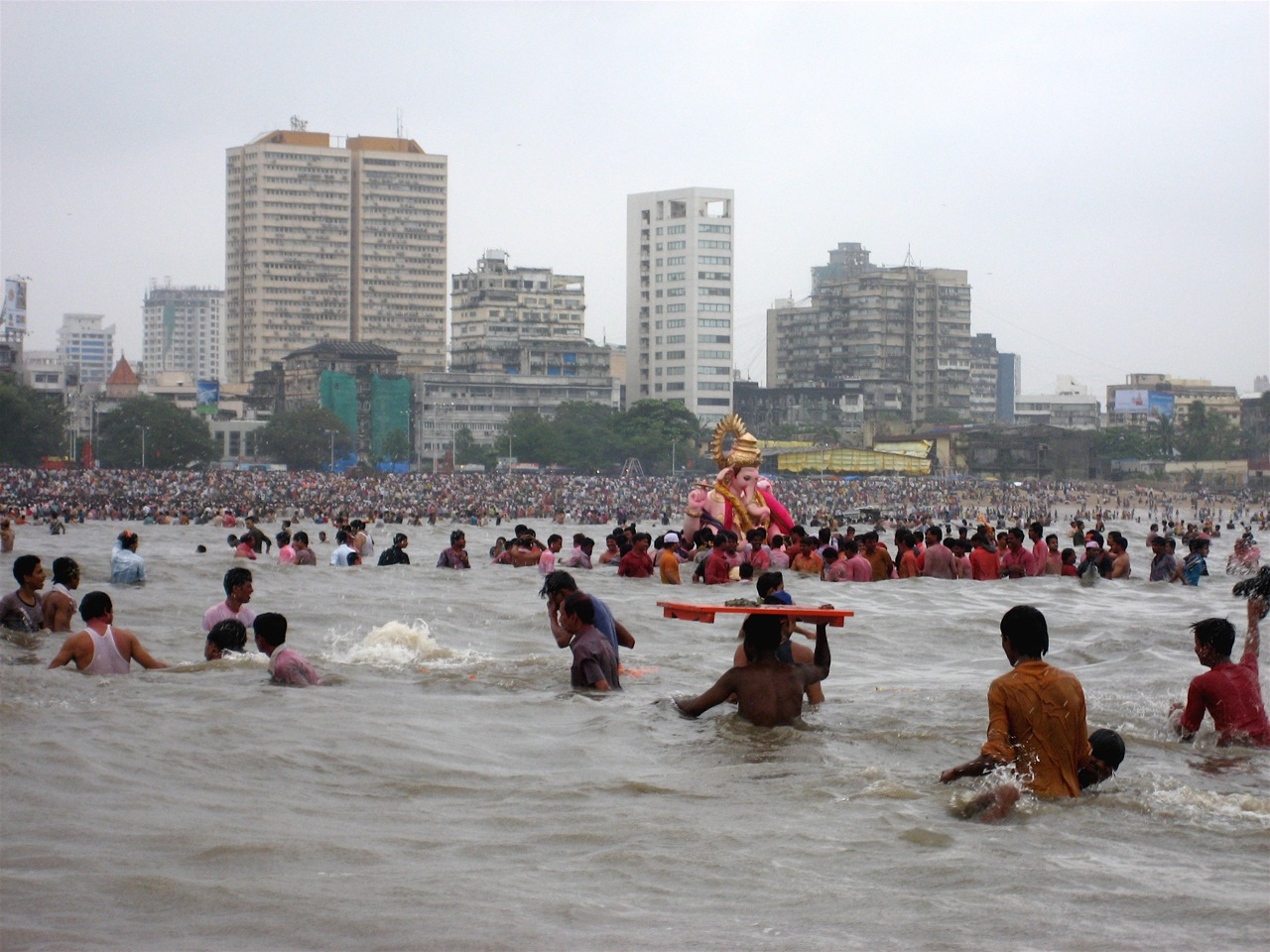
- Girgaon Chowpatty during Ganesh Visarjan

- Location within Mumbai
- Coordinates: 18.951°N 72.811°E
- Country: India
- State: Maharashtra
- District: Mumbai City
- City: Mumbai

Government
  - Type: Municipal Corporation
  - Body: Brihanmumbai Municipal Corporation (MCGM)

Languages
  - Official: Marathi
- Time zone: UTC+5:30 (IST)

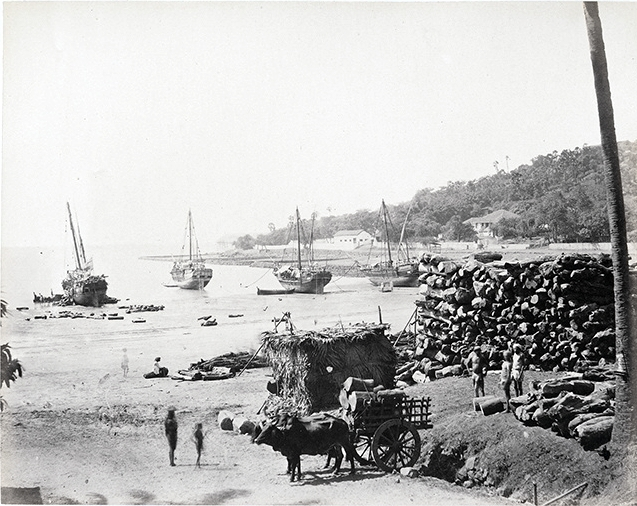
Chowpatty in 1860s

Girgaon Chowpatty (IAST: Giragāva Chaupāṭī), is a public beach at the eastern end of the Queen’s Necklace adjoining Malabar Hill in the Girgaon area of Mumbai (Bombay), Maharashtra, India.

== Pollution ==
The water surrounding the beach is severely polluted and unsafe for swimming. Fecal coliform was recorded in the water in 2013 at levels of 1455 per 100 mL, far above the acceptable standard of 500 per 100 mL. The presence of fecal coliform in the water has been attributed to waste from storm drains, open defecation, and the discharge of raw sewage from sewer pipes not connected to the city mains.

On 30 August 2016, the sand on the beach is said to be turning black due to a possible oil slick in the area. The specific cause of the blackening is unknown.

== Images ==
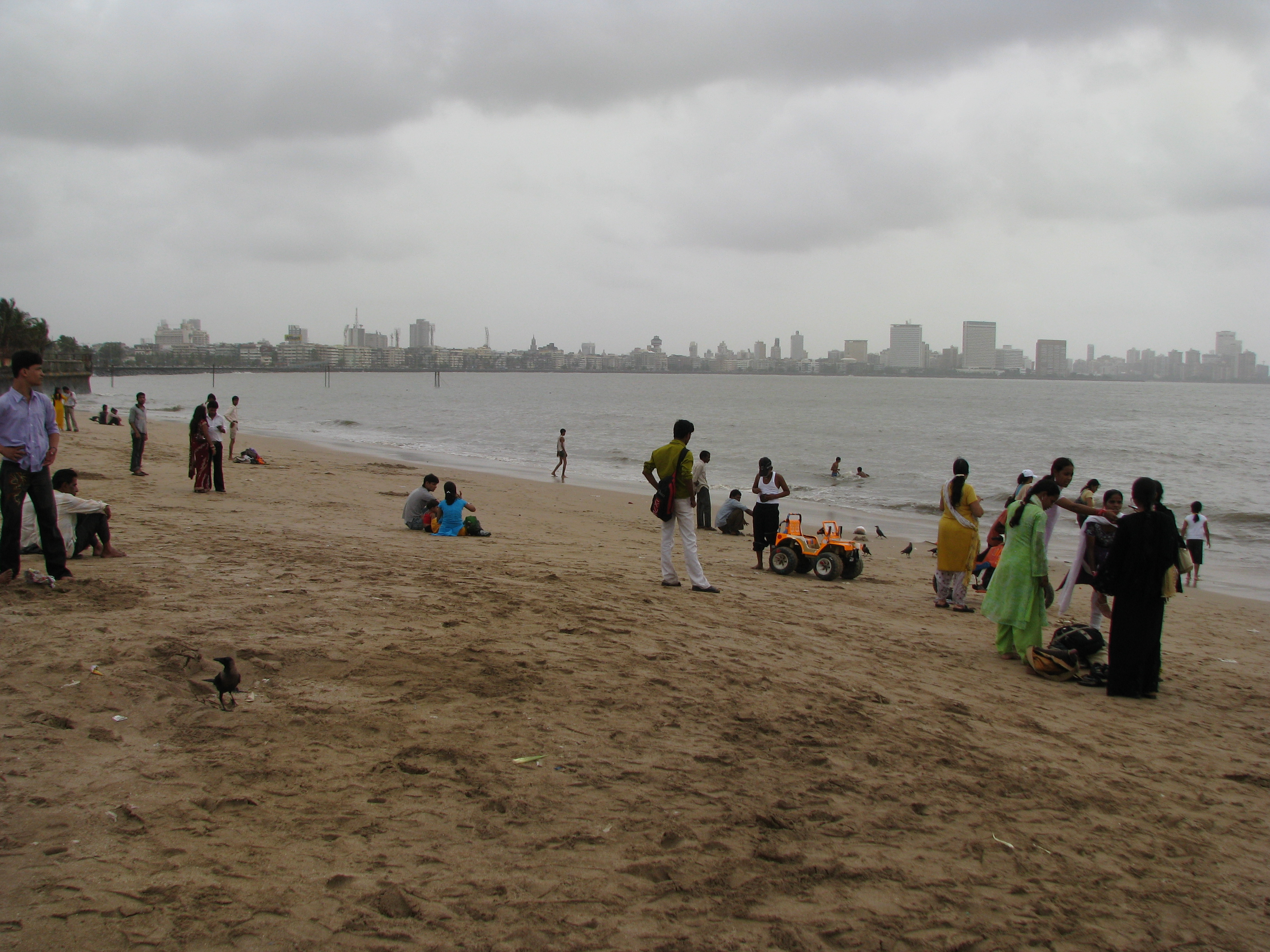
Girgaon Chowpatty with Nariman Point skyline in the background

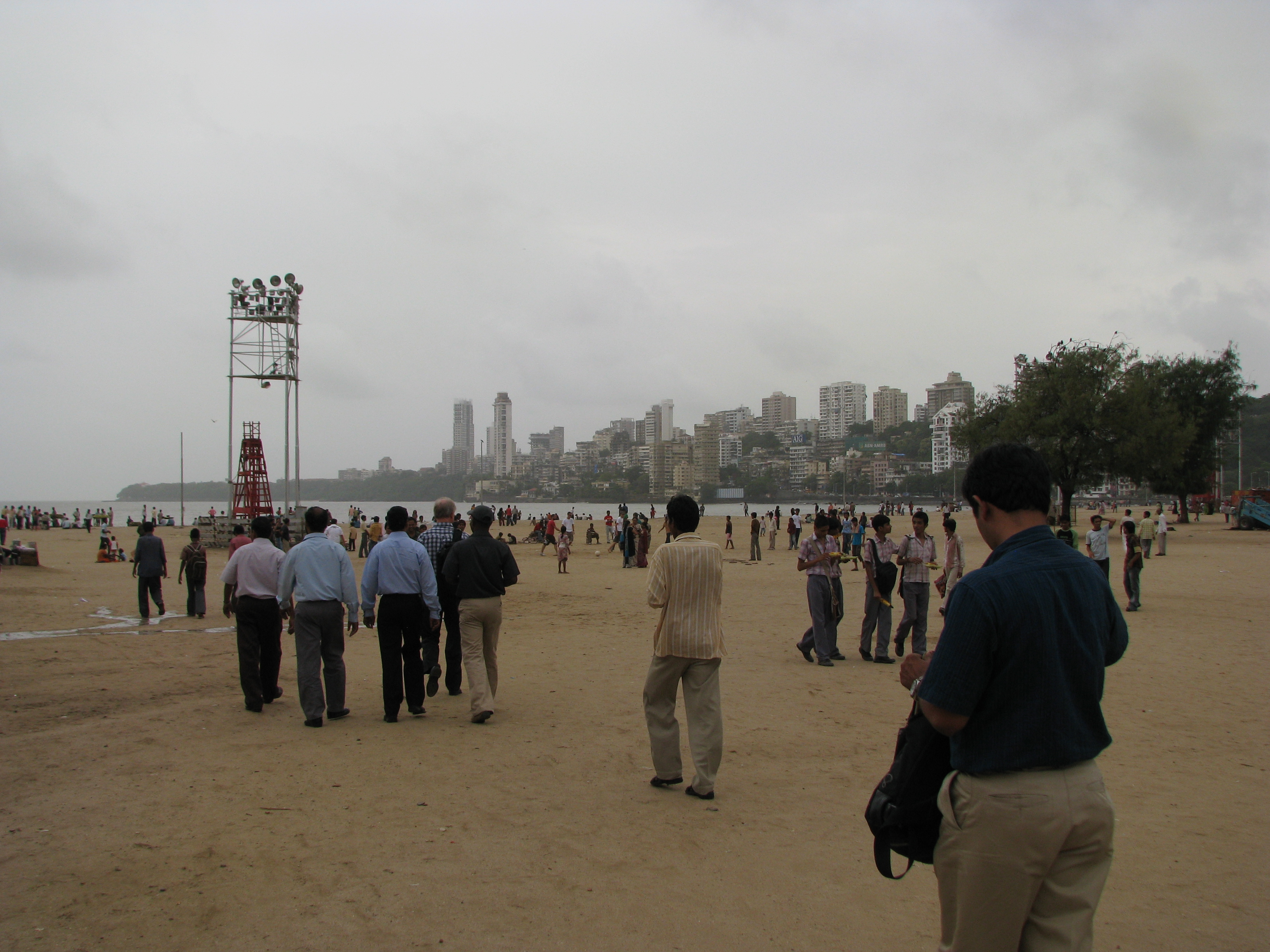
Girgaon Chowpatty with Malabar Hills in the background

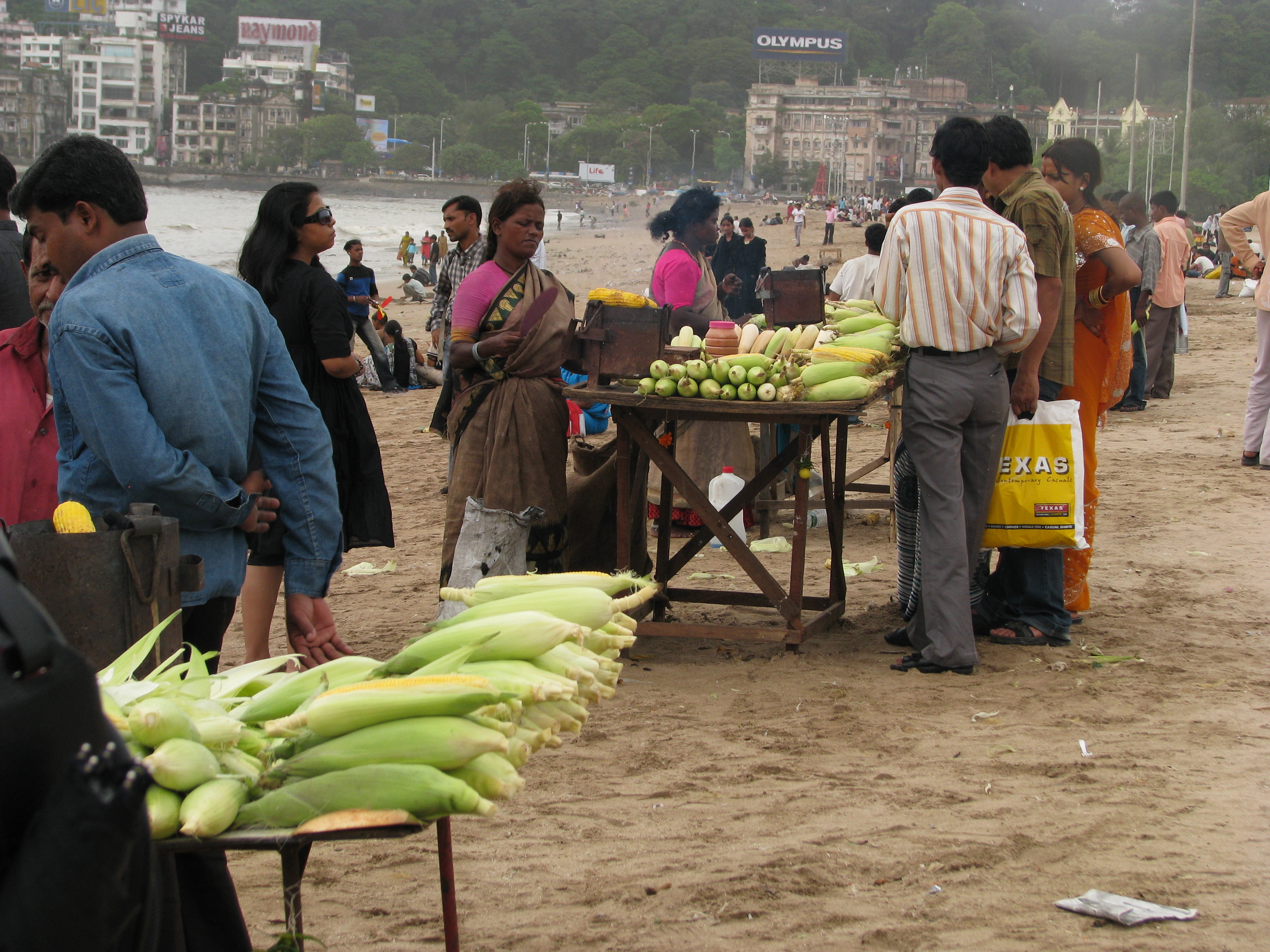
Corn cob vendors on Girgaon Chowpatty

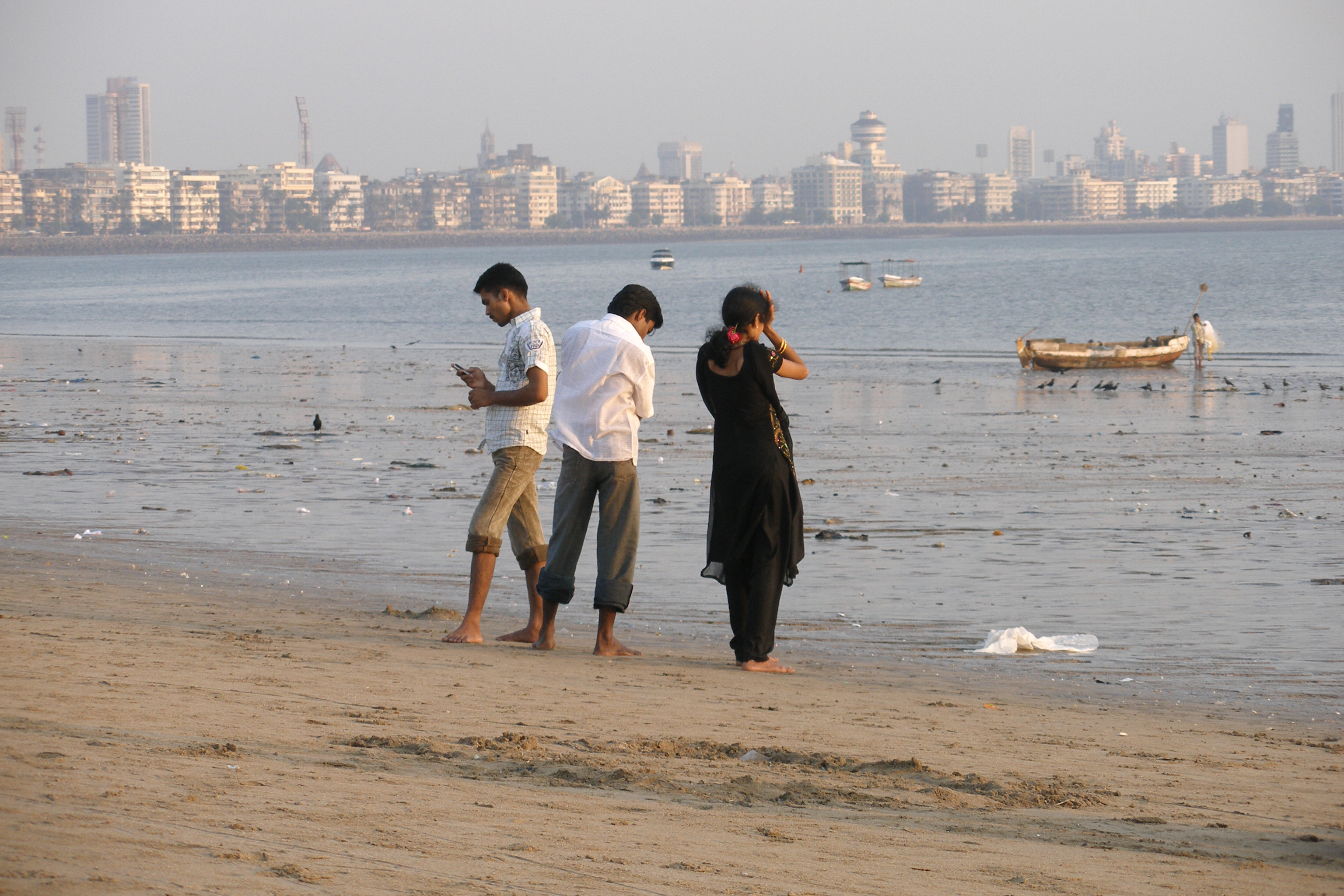
Walking

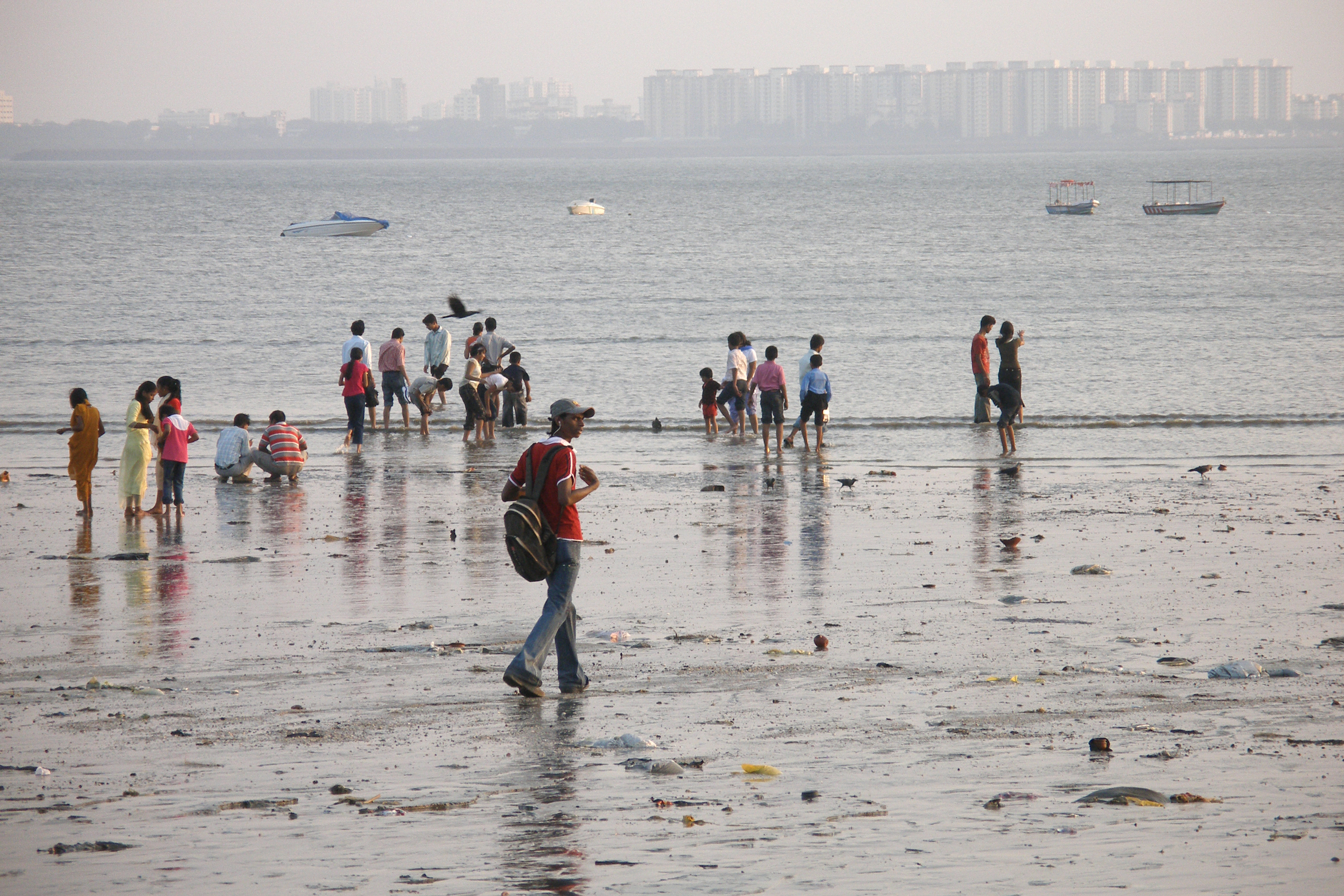
Walking

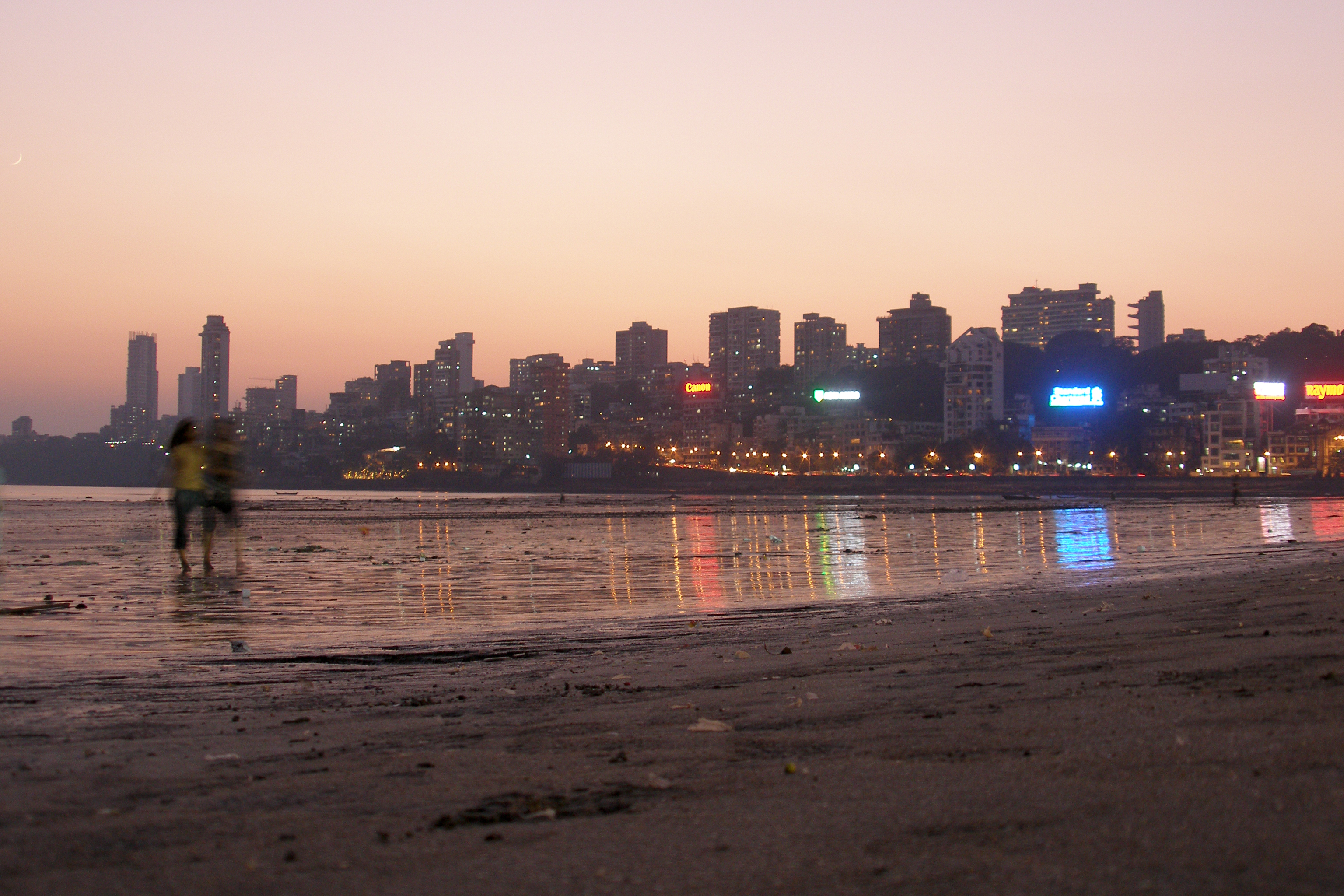
Twilight at Girgaon Chowpatty

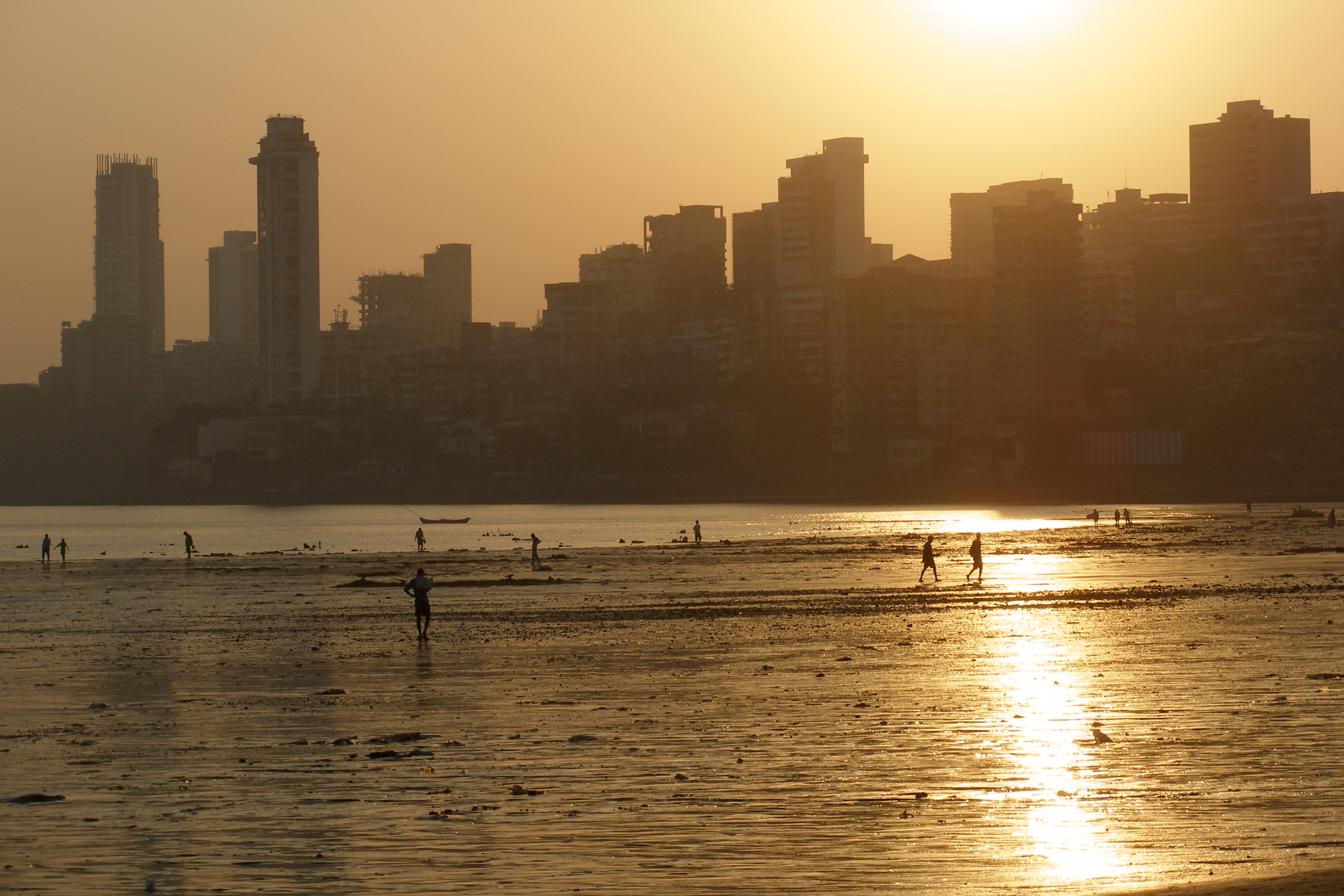
Sunset at Girgaon Chowpatty

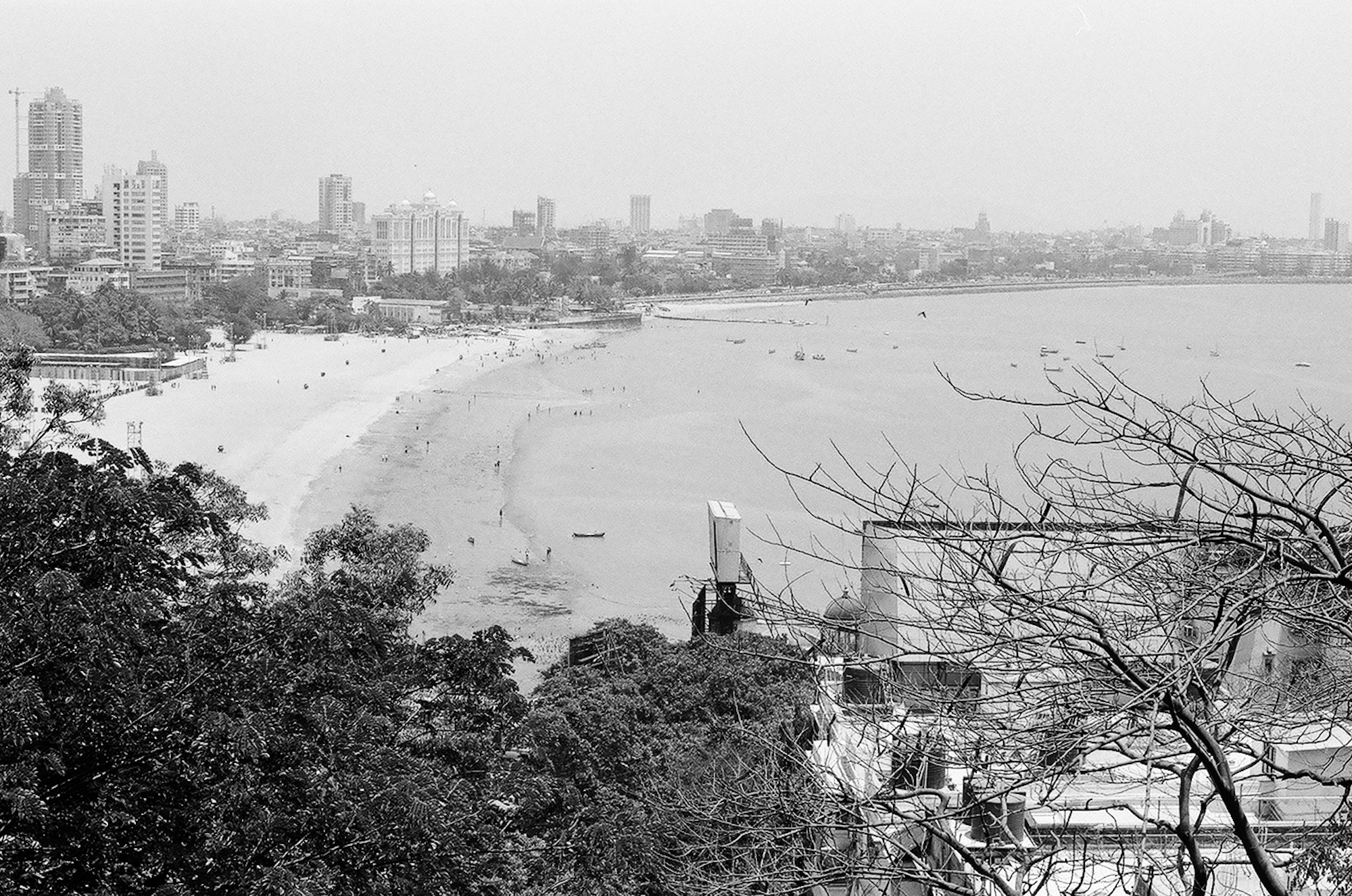
View of Girgaon Chowpatty from Malabar Hill

== See also ==
- List of beaches in India
- List of tourist attractions in Mumbai
- Tourism in Mumbai
