= Tourism in Mumbai =

Tourism in Mumbai (Bombay) is an industry that attracts almost 6 million tourists per year, making it the 30th-most visited location worldwide. According to United Nations, as of 2018, Mumbai was the second most populous city in India after Delhi and the seventh most populous city in the world with a population of 19.98 million.

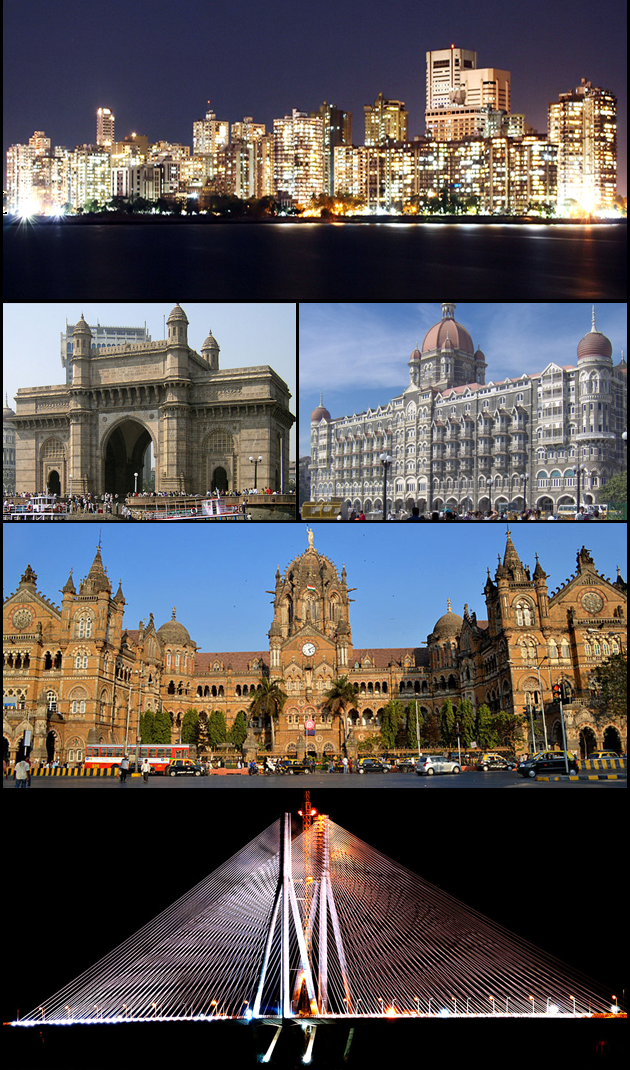
Clockwise from top: Cuffe Parade skyline, Taj Mahal Palace Hotel, Chhatrapati Shivaji Terminus, Bandra–Worli Sea Link, and the Gateway of India.

== Economic impact ==
The World Travel & Tourism Council calculated that tourism generated US$3.9 billion or 3.2% of the city's GDP in 2016 and supported 637,900 jobs, 7.3% of its total employment. The sector is predicted to grow at an average annual rate of 8.8% to US$9 billion by 2026 (3.1% of GDP). Mumbai's tourism industry accounted for 5.4% of India's total travel and tourism-related GDP in 2016, and employed 2.4% of the country's total workforce.

Foreign tourists accounted for 35.7% of all tourism-related spending in Mumbai in 2016. Nearly one-fifth of foreign tourists visiting the city come from the United Arab Emirates.

== Climate ==
Mumbai has a tropical climate. It has 3 seasons: summer, winter and monsoon. Summers are usually hot, winters are cool and the monsoon period brings rain to the city. The average minimum temperature varies between 15 C and 27 C. The average maximum temperature varies between 29 C and 34 C. The best period to visit Mumbai is from October to February.

== Water activities ==
Many beaches in Mumbai are open to the general public. Beach locations include:

- Juhu Beach
- Kalamb Beach
- Marvé Beach

Additionally, lakeside destinations in Mumbai include:

- Powai Lake
- Tulsi Lake
- Vihar Lake
- Bandra Talao

== Parks and recreation ==
Recreational destinations in Mumbai include:

- EsselWorld
- Adlabs Imagica
- Sanjay Gandhi National Park

== Forts and caves ==
Mumbai’s most significant historical locations include more than 14 forts and 5 naturally-formed caves. A few examples include:

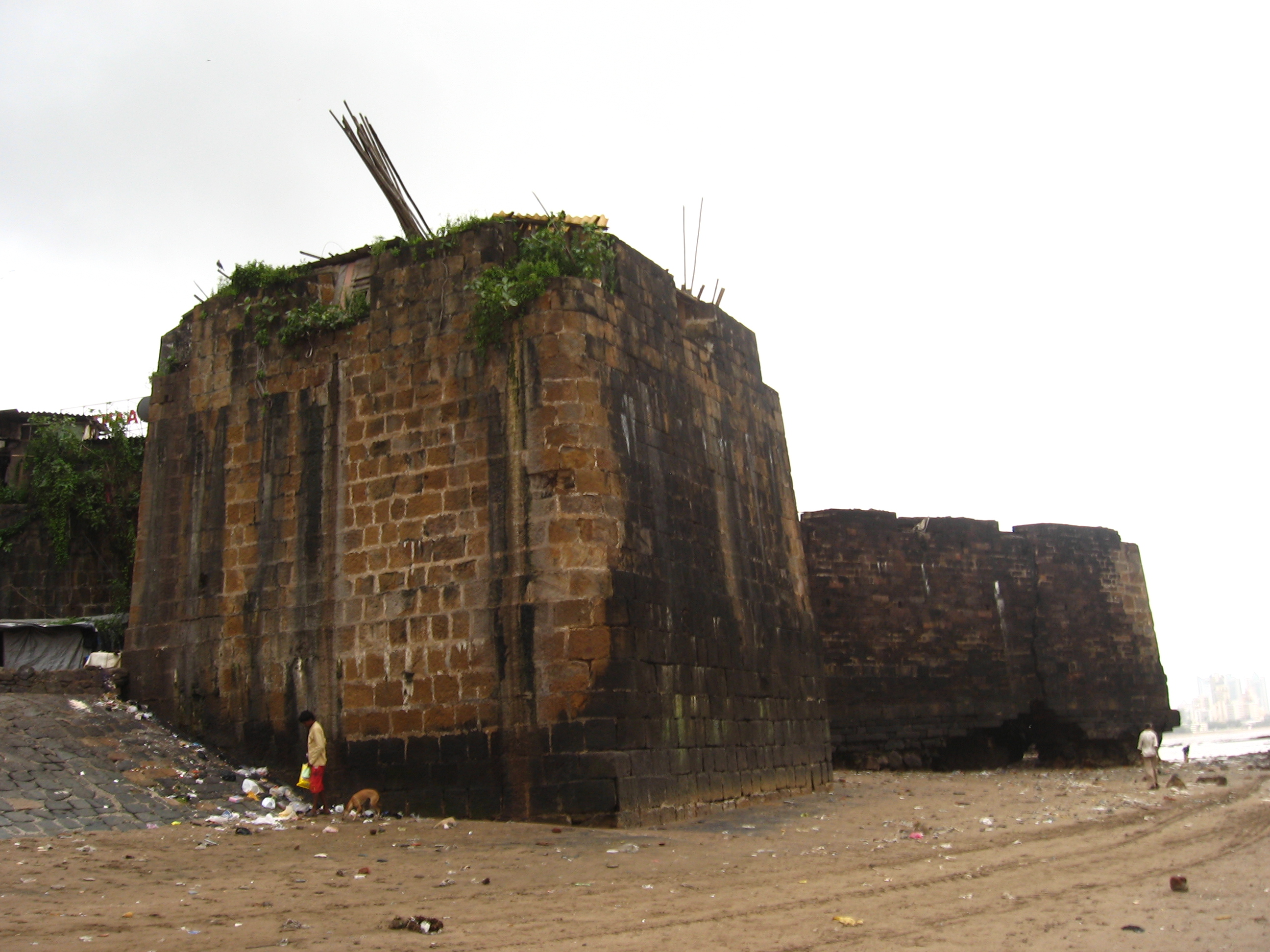
British fort in Mahim, Mumbai

- Elephanta Caves
- Kanheri Caves
- Mahim Fort
- Belapur Fort
- Bombay Castle
- Castella de Aguada

== Film City ==
One of the major attractions in Mumbai is the Film City in Goregaon. It was built by Dada Saheb Phalke and V. Shantaram. The Film City was built in the 20th Century and is situated near Goregaon & Borivali National Park. The entry to the Goregaon Film City is free of cost and is open from 10 am to 11:30 pm. The Hindi film industry, often monotonously referred to as Bollywood, is based in Mumbai. It offers major cinemas and is home to more than 20 film studios.

== Other attractions ==
=== Religious destinations ===
Mumbai has a number of notable temples, mosques & churches. These include Siddhivinayak Temple, Mahalaxmi Temple, Haji Ali Dargah, Global Vipassana Pagoda, St Thomas Cathedral, Iskcon Temple, and the Mount Bandra Church .

=== Miscellaneous ===
- Gurudwara Khalsa Sabha (Matunga)
- Knesset Eliyahoo
- Nariman House
- Kitab Khana - bookstore

=== Other important historical sites ===
- Gateway of India
- Bandra-Worli Sea Link
