= Early life of Shivaji =

Chhatrapati Shivaji Maharaj was the founder of the Maratha Empire in the Indian subcontinent. This article describes Shivaji's life from his birth until the age of 19 years (1630–1649).

Shivaji Maharaj was born at the hill fort of Shivneri on 1 March 1630, which corresponds to 19 February 1630 of the Julian calendar used by the contemporary English traders in India. At the time of his birth, both the families of his father Shahaji and his mother Jijabai, served the Ahmednagar Sultanate in military and administrative capacities, although they subsequently transferred their allegiance to the Mughal Empire and the Bijapur Sultanate at different times.

As a general of Bijapur, Shahaji was deputed in southern Deccan after 1636, and did not see Shivaji for several years. Shivaji and his mother remained in Pune in Deccan, where Shahaji's subordinate Dadoji Kondadeo administered the family's jagir (feudal land grant) in Shivaji's name. As a teenager, Shivaji started acting independently of the Bijapur government, against the advice of Shahaji and Dadoji. He captured several hill forts at the expense of other vassals of Bijapur, and by the age of 15, started calling himself a Raja (king).

After Dadoji's death in 1647, Shivaji assumed full control of his father's jagir in the Pune region, and eliminated local challenges to his authority. He then invaded the northern Konkan region, making inroads into the territory of the Siddis of Janjira.

== Birth ==
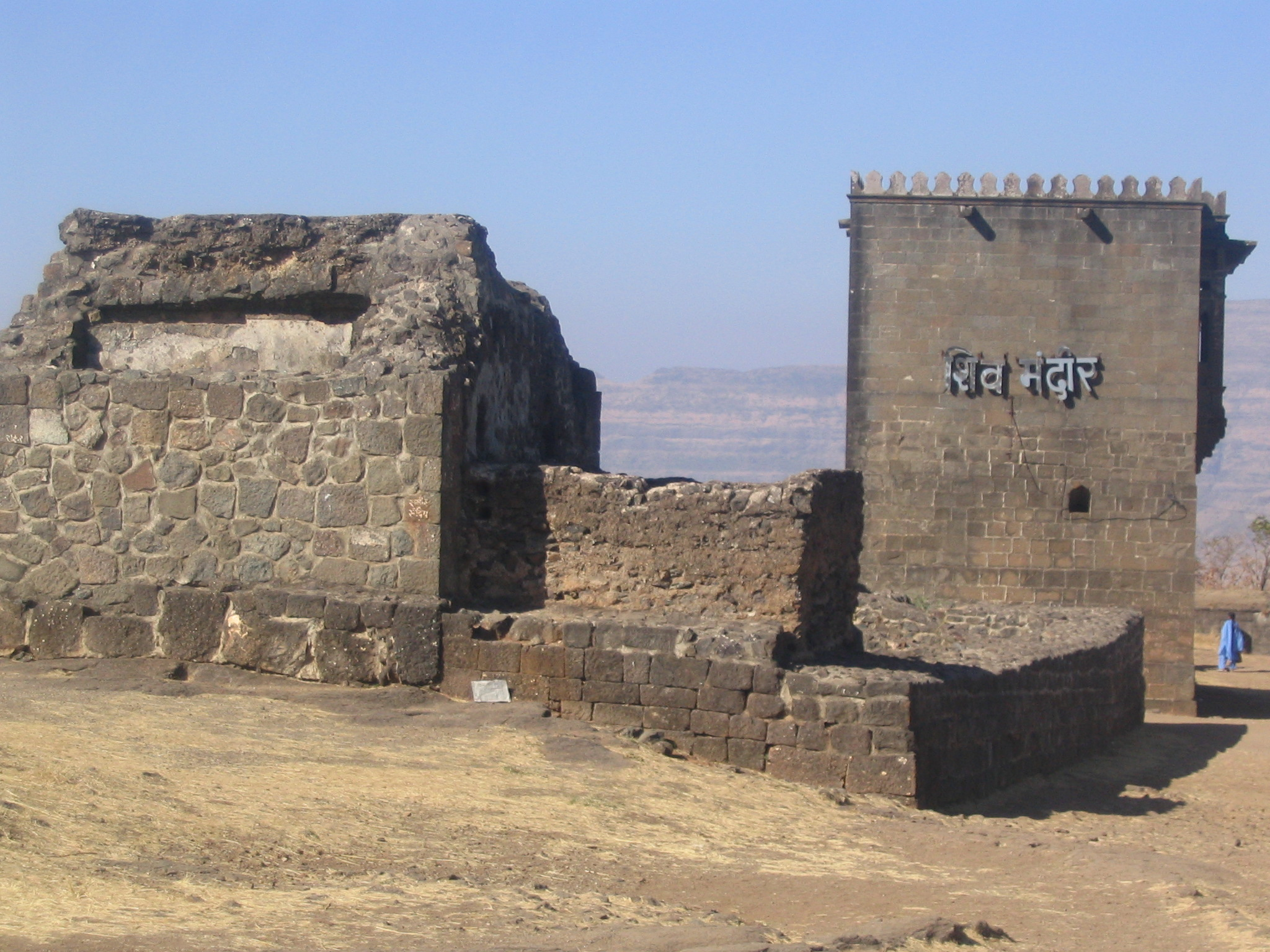
Shivaji's birthplace on Shivneri Fort

Most of the earliest surviving records of Shivaji's childhood were composed around 150 years after his birth. These records, especially the Marathi-language bakhars, contain several stories that are historically unreliable.

Shivaji's parents, Shahaji and Jijabai, had lost several other children in infancy. Shivaji was born on 1 March 1630, which corresponds to 19 February 1630 of the Julian calendar, at the hill fort of Shivneri. Jijabai named him after Shivai, a local goddess.

The British records in India used the Julian calendar until 1752 CE, when it was replaced by the Gregorian calendar; as a result, several historical records and books mention his birthdate as 19 February instead of 1 March. Historically, there was some debate about this date, because the Jedhe chronology - records maintained by the Jedhe family, whose ancestors served as Deshmukhs of Kari - places Shivaji's birth in 1627. However, the 1630 date is corroborated by a copy of his birth horoscope found in Rajasthan, and a poem composed by his courtier Parmanand.

Shiva-Bharata, a poem by Shivaji's court poet Paramananda, presents Shivaji as a divine incarnation. The poem also claims that during her pregnancy, Jijabai had cravings indicative of a child with royal and martial characteristics, such as to sit on a golden throne and to lead men to battle victories.

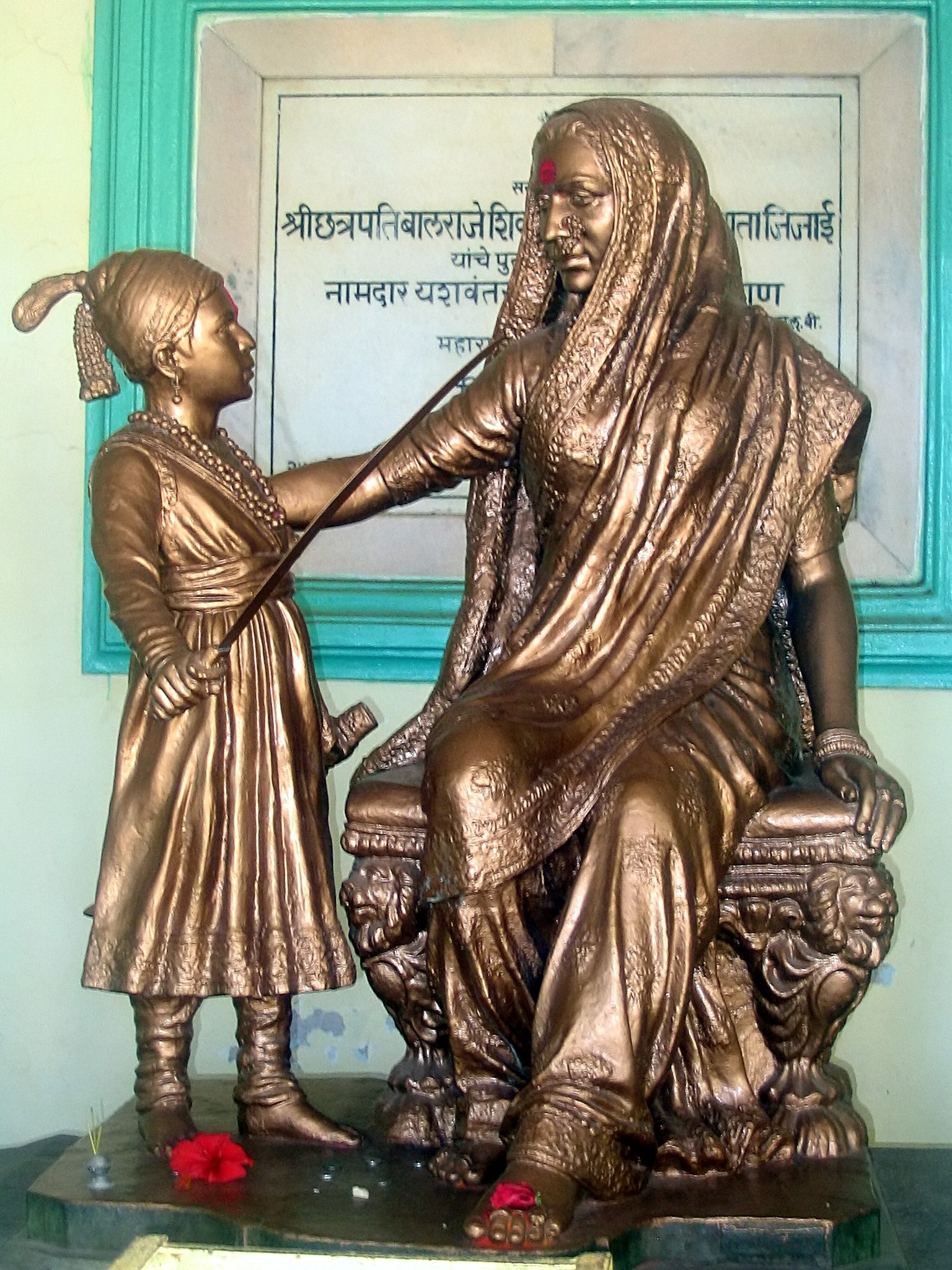
A statue of Shivaji and Jijabai installed at Shivneri in the 1960s

== Ancestry and self-identity ==
Shivaji's father Shahji belonged to the Bhonsle clan, which claimed patrilineal descent from the Sisodia Rajput royal family of Mewar. His mother Jijabai came from the aristocratic Jadhav family, which traced its lineage to the Yadavas of Devagiri. Bhonsle clan originated from Deccani tiller-plainsmen who is known by various names as Kunbi or Maratha.

During his coronation in 1674, Shivaji's royal priest Gaga Bhatta presented him as a member of the Kshatriya solar dynasty, counting the Sisodia Rajputs among his ancestors. The claim is also supported by Shiva-Bharata, a text composed at Shivaji's court. Some modern historians, such as John Keay and Jadunath Sarkar, believe the genealogy tracing Shivaji's ancestry to the Sisodia Rajputs to be a bogus one, fabricated to claim a Kshatriya social status. Historian Bal Krishna, relying on some firmans in possession of the chiefs of Mudhol (who claimed a shared ancestry with Shivaji), traced the ancestry of Shivaji to the Sisodia chief Lakshmasimha, who died at the Siege of Chittorgarh (1303) against Alauddin Khalji. However, these documents are of doubtful authenticity, and are considered spurious by other historians. According to Sarkar, Shivaji's ancestors were not Kshatriyas at all: they were agriculturalists from a Shudra background.

That said, although Shivaji is characterized as a Maratha in modern times, he probably identified himself as a Rajput, as suggested by contemporary Rajput newsletters, and a letter of his father Shahaji which calls his family Rajput. An English letter by the East India Company factor Henry Revington, dated 10 December 1659, also calls Shivaji a "Great Rajput".

Allison Busch, Professor at Columbia University states that Shivaji was not a Kshatriya as required and hence had to postpone the coronation until 1674. Shivaji hired Gaga Bhatt, a Brahmin scholar from Kashi, to trace his ancestry back to the Sisodias. Historians such as Surendra Nath Sen and V. K. Rajwade reject the Sisodia origin by citing the temple inscription of Math, dated to 1397 CE and holds the view that the genealogy was forged by Shivaji's men.

According to Sabhasad Bakhar, Shivaji did not belong to kshatriya varna. So, he had to try hard to win over brahmins in order to crown him as a true king.

== Before Pune ==
Shivaji's father Shahaji was a military leader in the Deccan region. During Shivaji's childhood, the present-day Maharashtra area in Deccan saw constant warfare between the Mughal Empire and the Deccan Sultanates, and suffered from famine. When his parents married, both their families served the Ahmednagar Sultanate. By the time of Shivaji's birth, Jijabai's family had deserted Ahmednagar, transferring its allegiance to the Mughal emperor Shah Jahan, thus becoming an opponent of Shahaji. A few years later, Shahaji also deserted Ahmednagar; he briefly served the Mughal Empire, but later rebelled against them, supported by the Bijapur Sultanate. Meanwhile, Jijabai's family remained loyal to the Mughals; her father was later assassinated by the nobles of Ahmadnagar.

During the Mughal invasion of Ahmadnagar in the 1630s, Shahaji fought against the Mughals. He was pursued by a Mughal force, and therefore, Shivaji and his mother moved from fort to fort, and Shivaji rarely saw his father. After the fall of Ahmadnagar in 1636, the Mughals concluded a peace treaty with Bijapur. As part of this treaty, Bijapur agreed to help the Mughals subjugate Shahaji, or to depute him away from the Mughal frontier if he chose to join the Bijapur service. Shahaji joined the Bijapur service: he was allowed to retain his jagir in the Pune region but was barred from living in that area as part of the treaty. He was deputed in southern India, and his jagir in the Pune region was placed under the nominal administration of his minor son Shivaji, with his subordinate Dadoji Kondadeo as its manager.

== In Pune ==
As part of the peace treaty with the Mughals, Shahaji ceded six forts, including Shivneri, to them in October 1636. He directed Dadoji Kondadeo to bring Jijabai and Shivaji from Shivneri to Pune, and take care of their expenses. Shivaji spent his formative years at Pune. Meanwhile, Shahaji departed for the south and did not see Shivaji for several years. In absence of his father, Shivaji grew very close to his mother. Neglected by her husband, Jijabai led a deeply religious - almost ascetic - life, and this religious environment had a profound influence on Shivaji.

Shahaji's land grant in the Pune region included the patil (village chief) rights to three villages, the deshmukh rights of Indapur, and the mokasa (revenue collection in exchange for military service) rights of Pune region. The mokasa land granted to Shahaji was a triangular region bounded by the Western Ghats in the west, the Bhima River in the north-east, and the Nira River in the south. This region had been devastated by constant warfare between Shahaji, Bijapur, and the Mughals in the 1630s. Dadoji tried to increase the regional revenue yield by offering cheap land leases and rewards to kill wolves so that more land could be brought under agricultural use. He organized a group of local soldiers to maintain law and order. According to the Sabhasad Bakhar, Dadoji took possession of lands controlled by twelve Deshmukhs of the Mawal region, and had those who resisted killed.

According to Chitnis Bakhar, Shivaji captured and killed Krishnaji Nayak Bandal, a Deshmukh of Hirdas Maval area whom Dadoji had failed to subjugate. Historian Jadunath Sarkar believes this to be incorrect, and states that it was Dadoji who completed the subjugation of the Maval Deshmukh's.

== Education and training ==
Shivaji's early training probably included what was expected of the son of a jagirdar: some reading and writing, horse-riding, martial arts, and religious practice. According to Tarikh-i-Shivaji, Dadoji personally trained Shivaji, and also appointed a good teacher for him. As a result, Shivaji became skilled in "fighting, riding, and other accomplishments".

Tarikh-i-Shivaji does not mention anything about Shivaji being taught to read and write. The Chitnis Bakhar (c. 1811) states that Shivaji had become "very learned" by the age of 10 years. Shiva-Digvijay claims that he mastered several arts and sciences as a boy. Historian Jadunath Sarkar notes that several Europeans visited Shivaji's court, and their accounts do not mention any reading or writing by Shivaji. Whenever these Europeans presented any letter to Shivaji, he would pass it on to his ministers for reading. Therefore, Sarkar concludes that Shivaji was illiterate like many other historical rulers of India, such as Akbar, Hyder Ali, and Ranjit Singh.

Whether or not Shivaji was literate, he listened to the recitations of the Hindu epics Ramayana and Mahabharata. The political and moral lessons from these epics greatly impressed his young mind. He was deeply interested in religious teachings and sought the society of Hindu and Muslim saints wherever he went.

== Alienation from father ==
Even when Shahaji was in northern Deccan, Shivaji and his mother Jijabai rarely saw him, because of Shahaji's military preoccupations. After Shahaji was deputed in the south, the father and son did not see each other for several years. Shahaji became Bijapur's governor of Bangalore in the south, and married another woman - Tukabai. Shivaji's elder brother Sambhaji moved to Bangalore, but Shivaji and Jijabai were called to Bangalore only in 1640. Meanwhile, Shivaji married Saibai, a member of the prominent Nimbalkar Maratha family. In 1642, Shivaji and his mother returned to Pune, after a formal presentation at the Bijapur court.

According to a doubtful narrative in Tarikh-i-Shivaji, Shahaji had developed a deep dislike for Jijabai's father Lakhuji Jadhav. After the death of his eldest son Sambhaji (or Shambhuji) at Kanakagiri in 1654, he declared that Shivaji - his surviving son from Lakhuji's daughter - would be no good. He then deserted Jijabai and Shivaji. Whatever the accuracy of this account, it is known from other texts that Shahji's wealth and affection were directed to Vyankoji alias Ekoji, his son from his younger wife Tukabai.

== Early conquests ==
Shivaji's earliest comrades and followers, called the Malvales, came from the Maval region around his Pune jagir. As a teenager, Shivaji explored the hilly area surrounding his jagir and became familiar with the Western Ghats region. Muhammad Adil Shah, the king of Bijapur, remained ill during the last decade of his life (1646-1656). During this time, the administration was largely handled by his queen, titled Bari Sahiba. Taking advantage of the instability, Shivaji captured several forts in the Bijapur territory.

By the time he was 15 years old, Shivaji called himself a "raja" (king). By this time, he commanded over a thousand soldiers, In a letter to a Hindu official, dated 17 April 1645, he wrote that God wished them to be independent under a self-ruled state.

Even before Dadoji's death, during 1645-1647, Shivaji controlled several hill forts around Pune, including Rajgad, Kondana (later Sinhagad) and Torna. The Sabhasad Bakhar states that Shivaji took control of the Kondana Fort by bribing its Bijapuri governor. In 1646, he sent an infantry led by Baji Pasalkar, Yesaji Kank, and Tanaji Malusare to take control of the Torna Fort. According to different historical texts, Shivaji's army captured the fort after tricking or bribing the local Bijapuri commander. Shivaji seized the local government treasury worth 200,000 hon (gold coins), and renamed the fort Prachandagarh, although this name did not stick for long. He built the Rajgad near Torna, with three walled redoubts.

The local jagirdars whom Shivaji had dispossessed complained to the Bijapur court against him. According to Khafi Khan's Muntakhab-al Lubab, Shivaji bribed some court ministers to get these complaints dismissed. According to the Chitnis Bakhar, Shahaji assured the king of Shivaji's loyalty and justified Shivaji's control of the Torna fort by arguing that the earlier administrator of the fort was negligent. Meanwhile, he secretly reprimanded Shivaji in a letter, and ordered Dadoji to keep him under control.

== After Dadoji's death ==
Dadoji advised Shivaji to rise in rank and wealth as an obedient vassal of the Deccan Sultanates, but Shivaji strived to be independent. Dadoji was greatly concerned about Shivaji's associations with hill brigands and his plans to rob forts. Dadoji complained to Shahaji but did not succeed in changing Shivaji's behavior. The Tarikh-i-Shivaji states that Dadoji committed suicide by poison, because he was disgusted with Shivaji's waywardness.

Shivaji probably participated in Dadoji Kondadeo's administration of Shahji's Pune jagir. During his last years, Dadoji had started issuing administrative orders in Shivaji's name. When Dadoji died in 1647, Shivaji assumed the full control of his father's jagir.

His officers included:

- Appointed by Shahaji around 1639:
  - Shyamraj Nilkanth Ranjhekar (or Rozekar), peshwa (Chancellor)
  - Balkrishna Dikshit, majumdar (Accountant-General)
  - Somaji Pant, dabir (Secretary)
  - Raghunath Ballal Korde, sabnis (Paymaster)
- Appointed by Shivaji
  - Tukoji Chor Maratha, sar-i-naubat (Commander-in-Chief)
  - Narayan Pant, divisional paymaster

=== Consolidation of power in Pune region ===
After Dadoji's death, Shivaji started consolidating his control over Shahaji's jagir around the Pune region. Dadoji had assigned the administration of the Supe mahal (subdivision) to Shambhuji (or Sambhaji) Mohite, the brother of Shahaji's second wife Tukabai. After Dadoji's death, Shambhuji refused to take orders from Shivaji, declaring that he would report directly to Shahaji. According to the Sabhasad Bakhar, Shivaji visited Shambhuji during the Shimga festival on the pretext of asking for a post, and imprisoned him. Shivaji confiscated all his property, including 300 horses, personal belongings including clothes, and other wealth. When Sambhaji still refused to recognize Shivaji's authority, Shivaji forcibly annexed Supe, and sent Shambhuji to Shahaji with his personal property.

Shortly after the annexation of Supe, Shivaji raided Junnar, where he captured 300 horses, goods worth 300 hons (gold coins), clothes, and jewels.

Firangoji Narsala, who had been appointed as the administrator of the Chakan Fort, accepted Shivaji's authority. The commanders of Baramati and Indapur also recognized his authority.

The Purandar Fort of Bijapur Sultanate was administered by Nilo Nilkanth Nayak, a Brahmin whose family had controlled the fort and its surrounding area for several years. His younger brothers Pilaji and Shankaraji resented being excluded from their hereditary rights to the fort, and requested Shivaji to arbitrate. Shivaji entered the fort as a guest during the Diwali celebrations, and three days later, the younger brothers imprisoned Nilo and brought him before Shivaji. Shivaji imprisoned all three brothers, and took control of the fort himself. According to the Chitnis Bakhar and Shiva Digvijaya, he later granted estates at other places to the younger brothers as compensation. He expelled Nilo Nayak's subordinates from the fort, and replaced them with his own men.

Subsequently, Shivaji also acquired control of several other forts around Pune, including Rohira, Tikona, Rajmachi, and Lohagad.

=== Invasion of Konkan ===
After consolidating his control over Pune, Shivaji crossed the Western Ghats, and entered the Konkan region on the western coast of India. The Kalyan jagir in this region was under the control of Mulla Ahmad, a Nawaiyat Muslim of Arab origin. The region had been recently acquired by the Bijapur Sultanate after the decline of the Ahmadnagar Sultanate, and Mulla Ahmad - who was considered a foreigner by the locals - remained away at Bijapur. Because of this, the administration of the jagir had become inefficient. Shivaji sent a cavalry led by Abaji Sondev to conquer the Kalyan jagir. The cavalry plundered much wealth and merchandise from the non-fortified towns of Kalyan and Bhiwandi, and captured the Mahuli fort which was once under the control of Shahaji.

Over the next year (1648), Shivaji consolidated his control in northern Konkan, establishing authority over local chiefs and capturing territories from the Siddis of Janjira. The Siddis had become practically independent after the fall of their former overlords - the kings of Ahmadnagar, although they recognized the nominal suzerainty of Bijapur. From Kalyan, Shivaji moved southwards towards Kolaba: several local Hindu chiefs invited him to their territories. He captured Surgad, Birwadi, Tala, Ghosalegad, Sudhagad, Kangori, and Rairi (Raigad, his future capital). He built new forts at Birwadi and Lingana. Shivaji appointed Abaji Sondev as the viceroy of this newly-conquered territory in northern Konkan.

Sometime in 1648, the Siddis inflicted a crushing defeat on Shivaji's forces led by the Peshwa Shyamraj Nilkanth Ranjhekar. According to the Chitnis Bakhar, a displeased Shivaji removed Ranjhekar from his post, and appointed Moropant Trimbak Pingle as the new Peshwa. He also sent a large army led by Raghunath Ballal Korde against the Siddis.

In late 1648, the Bijapur government imprisoned Shivaji's father Shahaji. According to Zahur's Muhammad-Namah (the official court history of Bijapur) and Basatin-i-Salatin (a later history), Shahaji was arrested for insubordination during the siege of Jinji against the Golconda Sultanate. However, Chitnis Bakhar, a Maratha chronicle written over 150 years after the event, states that Shahaji was arrested because the Bijapur court suspected him to be involved in the rebellious activities of his son Shivaji.

While his father was imprisoned at Bijapur, the Bijapur government sent an army to recapture Purandar from Shivaji, but this force was unable to dislodge Shivaji from the fort. Meanwhile, Shivaji unsuccessfully attempted to forge an alliance with the Mughals against Bijapur.

== See also ==
- Lal Mahal, the residential palace where Shivaji stayed during his early life.
