= Afzal Khan (general) =

Indian Bijapur Sultanate general (d. 1659)

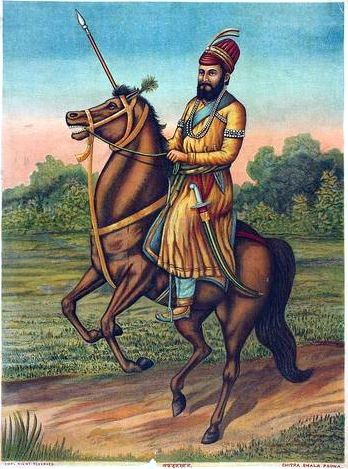
- A c. early 20th century painting
- Other names: Afzul Khan, Abdullah Bhatari
- Known for: Warrior, Military Commander, Administrator of Adil Shahi Dynasty
- Born: Early-17th Centuries
- Died: 10 November [O.S. 20 November] 1659; Foot of the Pratapgad fort
- Cause of death: Killing in Combat
- Buried: Tomb of Afzal Khan
- Issue: Fazl Khan
His Governmental Responsibilities
Governor of Wai
| Bijapur Sultan | Mohammad Adil Shah |
Governor of Pune
| Bijapur Sultan | Mohammed Adil Shah |
- Military career
- Allegiance: Bijapur Sultanate of Adil Shahi Dynasty
- Branch: Loyalist
- Rank: General
- Conflicts: See list: Bijapur–Nayaka War; Siege of Sira; Bijapur–Mysore War; Siege of Basavapattana; Bijapur–Maratha War; Battle of Pratapgarh X

Afzal Khan (died 10 November 1659) birth name Abdullah Bhatari was a general of the Adil Shahi dynasty of Bijapur Sultanate in the Deccan of India. He played an important role in the southern expansion of the Bijapur Sultanate by subjugating the Nayaka chiefs who had taken control of the former Vijayanagara territory.

In 1659, the Bijapur government sent Afzal Khan to subjugate Shivaji, a former vassal turned rebel. He was killed at a truce negotiation meeting with Shivaji, and his army was defeated at the Battle of Pratapgad.

== Victory over the Nayakas ==
Amid the decline of the Vijayanagara Empire, the Bijapur government campaigned against the Nayaka chiefs who had taken control of the former Vijayanagara territory. One of these chiefs was Virabhadra, the Nayaka of Ikkeri. Kenge Nayaka (or Keng Nayak), the chief of Basavapattana and a discontented tributary of Virabhadra, helped the Bijapur army capture Ikkeri in exchange for 1,00,000 rupees, forcing Virabhadra to flee to Bednur. Subsequently, the Bijapur government decided to capture the forts of Adoni and Tadipatri, which were ruled by friends of Kenge Nayaka. Kenge Nayaka suggested that the march to these areas was difficult, and instead advised Bijapur to capture Bangalore. In exchange for this advice, Kenge Nayaka demanded the fort of Sira, which was located on the way to Bangalore.

The Bijapur commander Randaula Khan sent a force led by Afzal Khan to capture Sira. Kasturi Ranga Nayaka, the commander of Sira, came out of the fort to negotiate with Afzal Khan, but Afzal Khan killed him. The defenders closed the fort gates before Afzal Khan could enter the fort, but Afzal Khan's contingent was soon reinforced by the main Bijapur army led by Randaula Khan. The Bijapur army captured the fort, and handed it over to Kenge Nayaka, while sending the captured wealth to Bijapur. Kenge Nayaka subsequently switched his allegiance to Bangalore, but then re-joined Bijapur, and convinced the Bangalore ruler Kempe Gowda to surrender his fort to Bijapur.

Randaula Khan then invaded Mysore, whose ruler Kanthirava Narasaraja I negotiated peace by paying 500,000 huns (currency unit) to Bijapur. Subsequently, Kenge Nayaka rebelled against Bijapur, and asserted independence at Basavapattana, where he raised an army of 70,000 soldiers to guard the fort. Randaula Khan then formed an alliance with his former overlord Virabhadra, the former Nayaka of Ikkeri, and besieged Basavapattana. Afzal Khan, along with Shahaji and some commanders of African origin, was deployed at the main gate of the Basavapattana fort. He entered the fort after a fierce battle, killed the guards, and captured the qasba – the central part of the fortified town. Kenge Nayaka then launched three successive attacks against him, but Afzal Khan forced him to retreat. Encouraged by Afzal Khan's successes, the Bijapur forces attacked Kenge Nayaka's contingent from both sides. After losing 3,700 soldiers, Kenge Nayaka surrendered the fort, and agreed to pay Bijapur 4 million huns. He was imprisoned, and later killed for attempting to bribe a guard for his release.

Bijapur's victory over Kenge Nayaka frightened the other Nayakas of present-day Karnataka into accepting Bijapur's suzerainty. Randaula Khan sent Afzal Khan to capture Chikkanayakana Halli, whose chief (raja) offered to accept Bijapur's suzerainty. The chief was allowed to keep control of the town (qasba) in exchange for 20,000 huns, but Afzal Khan took control of the fort. Afzal Khan then besieged the fort of Belur, joined by the main Bijapur army. After a four-month long siege, the local chief Venkatapati started peace negotiations, offering to cede the fort of Sakrepatna near Belur. Ultimately, he became a vassal of Bijapur, as did the Nayaka of Tumkur.

== Campaign against Shivaji Maharaj ==
Afzal Khan is best remembered for his campaign against Shivaji, the founder of the kingdom that later evolved into the Maratha Empire. This campaign, which resulted in Afzal Khan's death, came to be highly celebrated in the Marathi literature. The earliest sources that describe the episode include:

- Afzal Khan Vadh ("The Killing of Afzal Khan"), powada composed by Agrindas or Ajnandas in 1659, and probably revised later; the earliest known heroic ballad in Marathi language
- Cantos 17–21 of Shiva-Bharata, composed by Shivaji's court poet Paramananda at the time of his coronation in 1674
- Shri-Shiva-Prabhuche Charitra (or the Sabhasad Bakhar), a chronicle composed by Krishnaji Anant Sabhasad under the patronage of Shivaji's son Rajaram in 1697
- The Jedhe Shakawali (Jedhe chronology), records kept by the Jedhe aristocratic family

=== Background ===
Shivaji was a son of the Bijapur's general Shahaji, who had fought alongside Afzal Khan. He administered Shahaji's fiefs in the Pune region, and had started acting independently of the Bijapur government. He had captured territories ruled by other subordinates of Bijapur, and had negotiated with the Mughal emperor Aurangzeb, who had invaded the Bijapur Sultanate. Shivaji claimed to be a loyal servant of Bijapur, but the Bijapur government doubted his loyalty. During much of the 1650s, the Bijapur government had been unable to take any steps against Shivaji because it was busy dealing with the Mughal invasion, internal factional politics, and a succession dispute. After a peace treaty with the Mughals, and the general acceptance of Ali Adil Shah II as the king, the Bijapur government became more stable, and turned its attention towards Shivaji.

Ali Adil Shah II was a minor whose mother had been the de facto ruler since the mid-1640s, when his father had fallen seriously ill. The decision of sending Afzal Khan against Shivaji was probably taken by his mother. An English letter sent by factor Henry Revington to East India Company, dated 10 December 1659, states that the queen advised Afzal Khan to pretend friendship with Shivaji, because military strength would not be enough to defeat Shivaji.

Shivaji reportedly commanded a 60,000 infantry after his conquest of Javli. On the other hand, Afzal Khan's army – including infantry and cavalry – had 10,000 soldiers. This number is supported by the English letter, as well as Tarikh-i-Ali. Maratha sources suggest higher numbers, stating that Afzal Khan's army had as many as 35,000 infantry; 12,000 cavalry; and 500 cannons; according to American academic Nicholas Gier, these sources exaggerate the strength of Afzal Khan's forces in order to glorify Shivaji's victory. The Chitnis Bakhar states that Afzal Khan's army numbered 30,000 men; and Sabhasad states that it had 12,000 cavalry plus additional infantry. Shivaji-Pratapa, Rairi Bakhar, 91 Qalami Bakhar, and Tarikh-i-Shivaji state that Afzal Khan's army numbered 12,000.

=== Desecration of temples ===
Afzal Khan, like the ruler of Bijapur, was a Muslim, while Shivaji was a Hindu. According to Shiva-Bharata (1674), composed under Shivaji's patronage, Afzal Khan's army started its march amid several evil omens, such as falling meteors and thunderbolts in cloudless sky. The text states that Afzal Khan first came to Tuljapur, where he destroyed the idol of Shivaji's family goddess Bhavani, and slaughtered a cow (considered holy by the Hindus) in front of her temple. Afzal Khan Vadh states that Afzal Khan challenged the goddess to show her some miracle. He went on to desecrate the Hindu temples at Pandharpur and Shikhar Shingnapur (Shambhu Mahadev).

Sabhasad also supports the account of Afzal Khan's desecrations at Tuljapur and Pandharpur. The Chitnis Bakhar and Shiva Digvijaya state that the idols at Tuljapur and Pandharpur were removed before Afzal Khan could destroy them. The contemporary English letters of the East India Company, the Dutch East India Company's Dagh-register, and the Portuguese records do not mention any desecration of temples by Afzal Khan.

Afzal Khan finally encamped at Wai, a town that he had governed in the earlier years. Shivaji had taken up residence in the newly fortified Pratapgad, and Afzal Khan's desecration of Hindu sites was probably aimed at provoking Shivaji into leaving the safety of the fort. These actions alienated the local Hindu deshmukhs, who could have provided local support to Afzal Khan. Since Afzal Khan had governed the Wai region in the past, and knew it well, he presumed that he did not need such local support.

=== Negotiations ===
At Wai, Afzal Khan wrote to local chiefs, seeking their support against Shivaji. Vithoji Haibat Rao, the deshmukh of Gunjan-Maval, was asked to bring a contingent to Javli in Afzal Khan's support. Khandoji Khopde agreed to support Afzal Khan on the condition that he would be made the deshmukh of Rohidkhore, which was held by Shivaji's loyalist Kanhoji Jedhe.

According to Sabhasad, Afzal Khan then sent his envoy Krishna Bhaskar Kulkarni to Shivaji, declaring that he was a great friend of Shivaji's father Shahaji. He promised that he would use his influence in the Bijapur court to get the king to officially recognize Shivaji's control over Konkan and various forts. He also promised to secure further distinction and military equipment for Shivaji from Bijapur. Finally, he declared that Shivaji was welcome to attend the Bijapur court, or be granted an exemption from personal attendance, if he so desired.

Meanwhile, Afzal Khan's unchallenged march to Wai had greatly frightened Shivaji's followers. His well-equipped army had freely plundered the territory of Shivaji, who had confined himself to a fort instead of challenging Afzal Khan in an open battlefield. Both Sabhasad and Chitnis Bakhar state that Shivaji's counsellors urged him to avoid losses by negotiating peace with Afzal Khan.

Texts such as Afzal Khan Vadh and Shiva-Bharata claim that the goddess Bhavani appeared in Shivaji's dream, warning him of Afzal Khan's treacherous plans, and assuring him of victory. After waking up, Shivaji prayed to the goddess, and resolved to either win against Afzal Khan or die fighting. He summoned the armies of his generals – Moro Trimbak Pingle from Konkan and Netaji Palkar from the Ghats – close to Pratapgad.

Shivaji treated Afzal Khan's envoy Krishnaji Bhaskar with respect, and met him secretly at night, urging him as a Hindu to divulge Afzal Khan's real intentions. Krishnaji hinted that Afzal Khan had treacherous plans. Shivaji then sent Krishnaji back to Afzal Khan with his own agent Gopinath Pant. The envoy presented Shivaji as someone who respected Afzal Khan as an elder and an associate of his father, and as someone who was willing to submit easily. However, his real objective was to find the enemy's military strength and intentions. Sabhasad states that Gopinath bribed Afzal Khan's officers, and learned that Afzal Khan planned to arrest Shivaji at the meeting.

After learning these details from Gopinath, Shivaji pretended that he was scared of Afzal Khan, and refused to come to Wai for a meeting. Shivaji's envoy proposed a negotiation meeting with only a few bodyguards at Javli, located near the foot of the Pratpagad fort. Afzal Khan agreed, and accordingly, Shivaji ordered his men to clear forest and create a path from Wai to Pratapgad.

The place chosen for the meeting was a crest located below Pratapgad, overlooking the Koyna River valley. One day before the meeting, Afzal Khan marched to Par, a village near Pratapgad, via the Radtondi pass. His soldiers encamped in scattered places, close to water bodies near the source of the Koyna River. Meanwhile, Shivaji placed his soldiers in ambush at various intervals along the path leading to the meeting point. He set up luxurious tents at the meeting place.

Before departing for the meeting, Shivaji left instructions for continuation of his government, in case he was killed at the meeting.

=== Meeting with Shivaji Maharaj and death ===
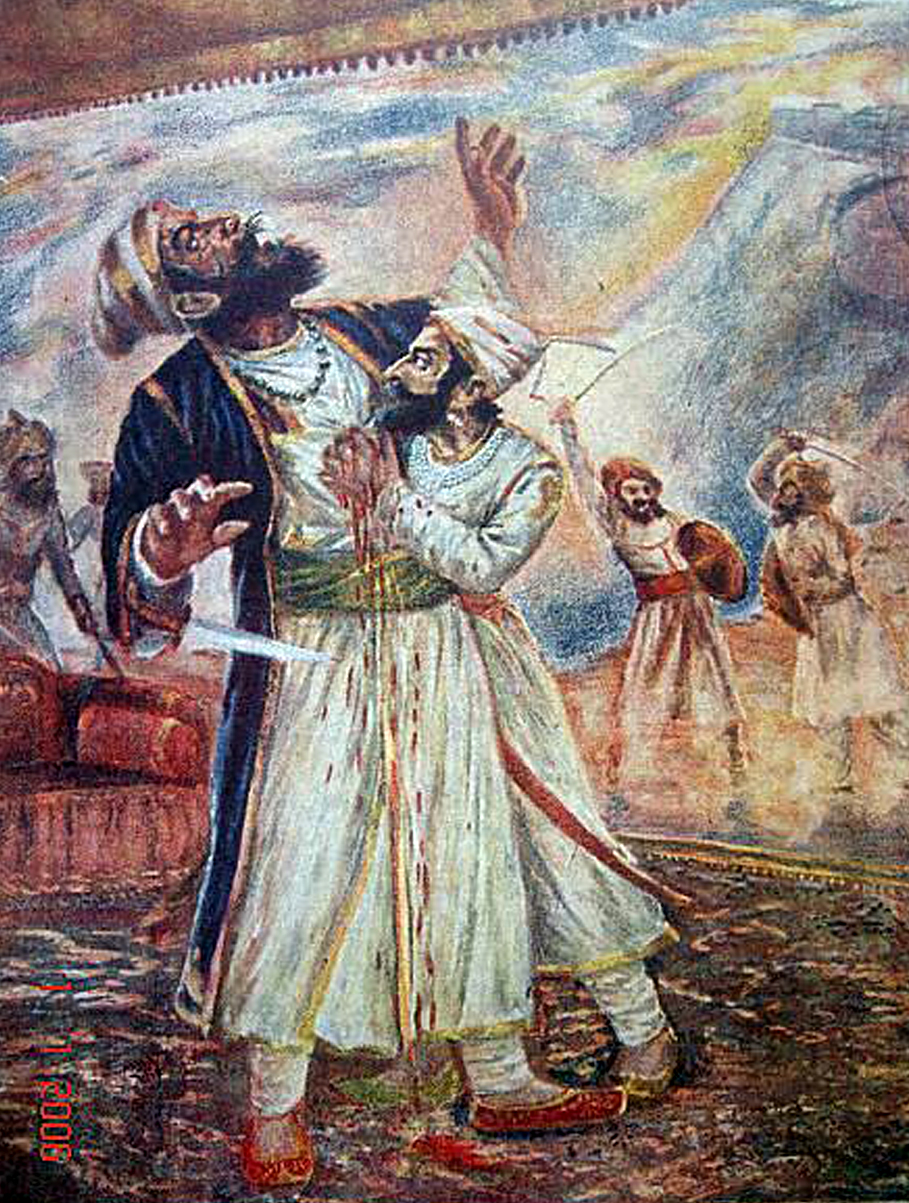
A painting from the 1920s depicts Shivaji injuring Afzal Khan

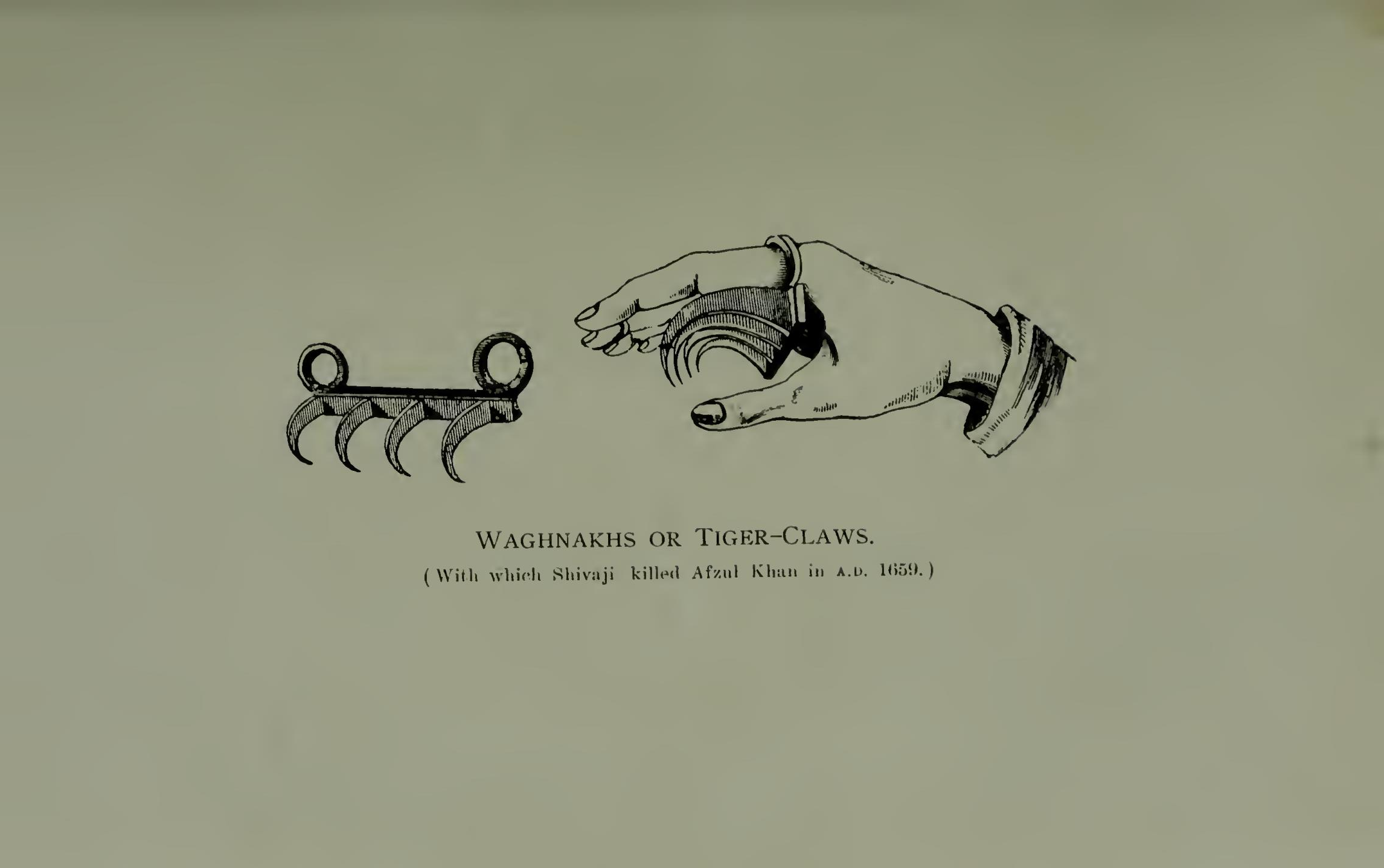
Bagh nakh (or wagh nakh), the weapon used by Shivaji against Afzal Khan

Shivaji took precautionary measures to defend himself against Afzal Khan: he put on thin chain mail and an iron armour under his clothes, and concealed two weapons: the bagh nakh ("tiger claws" or metal hooks attached to fingers), and a sword said to be "possessed" by the goddess Bhavani. He left for the meeting accompanied by two soldiers – his expert swordsman Jiva Mahala and Shambhuji Kavji, each of whom carried two swords and a shield.

Afzal Khan left his camp at Par with an escort of 1,000 soldiers. However, Shivaji's envoy Gopinath argued that such a large escort would scare Shivaji away from the meeting, and convinced Afzal Khan to bring only two soldiers to the meeting, just like Shivaji. Accordingly, Afzal Khan left most of his escort at a short distance from the meeting place, and came to meet Shivaji in a palki, accompanied by five men: two soldiers, his expert swordsman Sayyid Banda, and the envoys Krishnaji and Gopinath.

Shivaji, who was waiting at a distance from the meeting place, demanded that Sayyid Banda leave the tent where the meeting was scheduled. Afzal Khan agreed to the demand: both Afzal Khan and Shivaji now entered inside the tent, each accompanied by three men – two soldiers and an envoy. Afzal Khan insulted Shivaji by calling him a peasant (kunbi) boy, Shivaji responded by calling him a son of a fry cook (bhatari).

According to the Maratha texts, Afzal Khan asked Shivaji to submit to the Bijapuri king Adil Shah, and be recognized as a vassal lord. He pretended to embrace Shivaji, but then quickly stabbed him with a concealed weapon. Shivaji was protected by his chain mail, and retaliated. Afzal Khan then rushed out of the tent; his companion Sayyid Banda attacked Shivaji, but was killed by Jiva Mahala. This event is remembered in a Marathi language idiom Hōtā Jivā Mhaṇun Vāchlā Shivā ("Because of Jiva; Shivaji survived the attack").

Afzal Khan was subsequently killed and beheaded. The various sources differ regarding who killed Afzal Khan, and how:

| Source | Weapon used by Shivaji to injure Afzal Khan | Afzal Khan was beheaded by... |
|---|---|---|
| Sabhasad's Shri-Shiva-Prabhuche | bagh nakh and dagger | Sambhaji Kavji |
| Shri Digvijaya | bagh nakh and sword | Yesaji Kank |
| Chitnis Bakhar | bagh nakh and sword | Yesaji Kank and Tanaji Malusare |
| Jedhe Karina | bagh nakh and sword | |
| 91 Qalami Bakhar | dagger and sword | Shivaji himself |
| Tarikh-i-Shivaji | bagh nakh and dagger to cut open Afzal Khan's stomach; also used shamsah and other weapons | Shivaji, using a sword |
| Shiva-Bharat | The Bhavani sword | |
| Rairi Bakhar | dagger concealed in right arm | |
| English letter | dagger concealed near chest | |
| John Fryer | stiletto (dagger) concealed in coat sleeve | |
| Khafi Khan's Muntakhab-al Lubab | dagger | |
| Niccolao Manucci | "small and very short lancet" | |

Muntakhab-al Lubab, a work by the Mughal chronicler Khafi Khan, attributes the treachery to Shivaji instead: it states that Shivaji feigned humility and tears while approaching Afzal Khan, confessing his sins and asking for forgiveness after every 3–4 steps. He then pretended to tremble with fear, and requested that Afzal Khan's companions withdraw to a distance. In reality, he had stationed his soldiers in ambush in every cave, and concealed a bichuwa (dagger), which he used to attack Afzal Khan.

After Afzal Khan's killing, Shivaji's Maratha troops, hidden in the forest, came out and routed the Bijapur army at the Battle of Pratapgad, on 20 November 1659 (10 November 1659 in Julian calendar). According to Revington's letter, around 3,000 of Afzal Khan's soldiers died in the battle. Two of Afzal Khan's sons were captured by Shivaji's soldiers. Another son – Fazl Khan – escaped along with Afzal Khan's wives with the support of Khandoji Khopde. The Maratha texts state that many of Afzal Khan's men were killed, but those who surrendered were invited to join Shivaji.

== Legacy ==
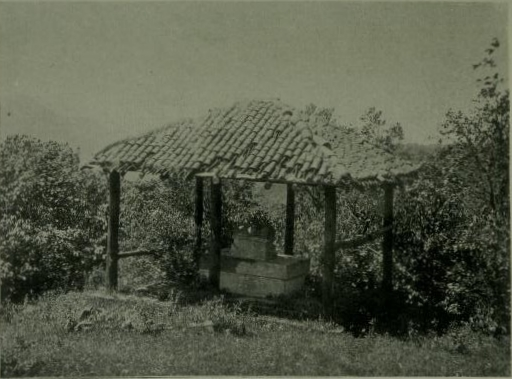
Afzal Khan's tomb at Pratapgad

Afzal Khan's head was presented before the goddess Bhavani and Shivaji's mother Jijabai as a trophy, and later buried under the "Abdullah Tower" at Pratapgad. The rest of Afzal Khan's body was buried in Javli.

Shivaji's victory over Afzal Khan caught the popular imagination of the local public, and ballads glorifying the event were sung by wandering bards (gondhalis). The victory is also glorified in the local literature (see Powada). The Afzal Khan Vadh equates Shivaji to Rama, and Afzal Khan to Ravana. The Shiva-Bharata similarly describes Shivaji as an avatar of Vishnu, while portraying Afzal Khan as a demonic incarnation. The Shri-Shiva-Prabhuche compares the conflict to the legendary Kurukshetra War, equating Shivaji to Bhima and Afzal Khan to Duryodhana.

Several legends about Afzal Khan's fatal campaign became popular in the following years. One of these legends claims that he had a premonition about his death from an astrologer before he started his march against Shivaji. Therefore, he killed and buried his 63 wives at Afzalpura near Bijapur to ensure that no other men would get them after his death. The graveyard of his 63 wives is known as Sath Kabar.

An annual urs (death anniversary celebration) was held at Afzal Khan's tomb, but in the 1990s, right-wing Hindus objected to the alleged Muslim glorification of Afzal Khan as a martyr during the event. They formed an organization called Pratapgarh Utsav Samiti, and started organizing "Shiv Pratap Din" ("Shivaji Glorification Day") to celebrate Shivaji's victory over Afzal Khan. The Samiti observed the day at the Pratapgad fort from 1996 to 2004, when the Congress-NCP-led Maharastra state government banned the politicized celebration because of provocative speeches and riots at the event. In 2014, the state passed a resolution banning exhibition of paintings of Shivaji killing Afzal Khan, after some Muslim groups objected to such a painting.

Later Shiv Pratap Din was granted festival status by the government. On 30 November 2022, Maharashtra chief minister Eknath Shinde celebrated Shiv Pratap Din by hoisting flag at Pratapgad fort.

== Popular culture ==
=== Films and television ===
- In the 2008-2009 Indian historical TV serial Raja Shivchhatrapati, he is portrayed by Shailesh Pitambare.
- In the 2011 Indian Marathi-language historical film Rajmata Jijau, he is portrayed by Rahul Solapurkar.
- In the 2011-2012 Indian historical TV serial Veer Shivaji, he is portrayed by Nawab Shah.
- In the 2019-2021 Indian historical TV serial Swarajyajanani Jijamata, he is portrayed by Amit Tadwalkar.
- In the 2022 Indian Marathi-language historical film Sher Shivraj, he is portrayed by Mukesh Rishi.
- In the 2026 Indian Marathi-language historical film Raja Shivaji, he is portrayed by Sanjay Dutt.

== See also ==
- Shaista Khan, a Mughal general whose defeat by Shivaji is similarly celebrated in Marathi literature
