= Mangalgarh =

Mangalgarh may refer to:

- Mangalgarh, Bhopal, a village in the Berasia tehsil of Madhya Pradesh, India
- Mangalgarh, Samastipur, a village in the Hasanpur Tehsil of Samastipur, Bihar, India
- Mangalgad, a fort in Maharashtra near the village of Dudhanewadi
