= Ghosalegad Fort =

- Raigad district, Maharashtra

Site information
- Type: Hill fort
- Owner: Government of India
- Open to the public: Yes
- Condition: Ruins

Location
- Shown within Maharashtra
- Coordinates: 18°21′51.1″N 73°05′25.6″E
- Height: 260 M (850ft)

Site history
- Materials: Stone

Ghosalegad Fort is located 8 km south of the Roha town on Roha-Bhalgaon-Murud road. This fort is in form of a narrow strip 20mt in width. This fort has a small hill with a narrow spur guarded by fortification. This fort served to keep watch on the enemy and the trade route from Maval to the sea ports around

== History ==
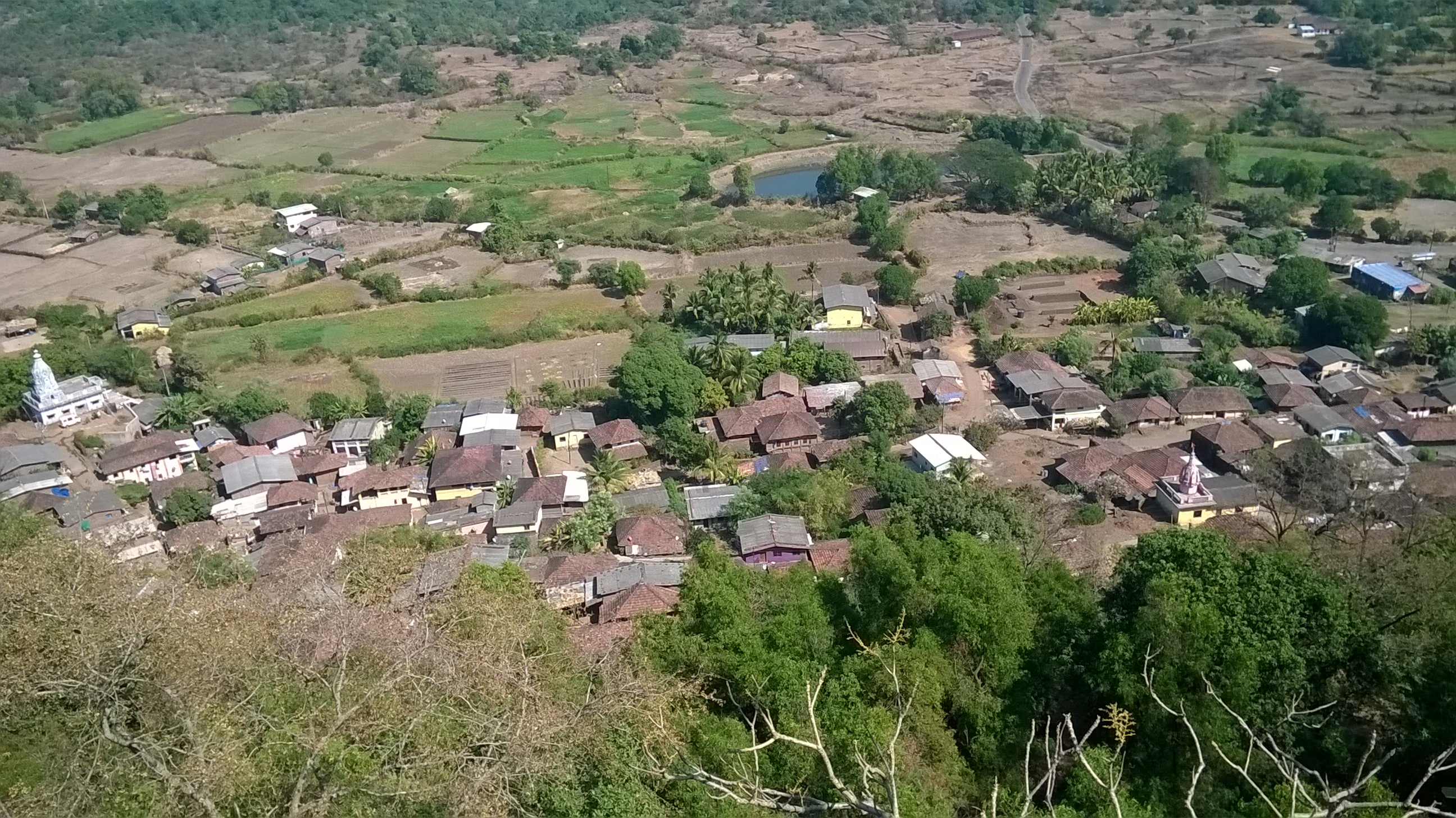
Village Ghosale from the fort

It is not known about who built this fort. In the 16th century, this fort was under the control of Adilshah of Bijapur. Chatrapati Shivaji Maharaj won this fort in 1648. This fort was encircled by troops of Siddhi of Janjira when Afzalkhan had tried to kill Chatrapati Shivaji Mahraj at Pratapgad, However, Shivaji Maharaj killed Afzalkhan and knowing this Siddhi also returned with the troops to Janjira. At times this fort was in control of Siddhi, Angre and Maratha rule. Finally, Col. Prother captured this fort in 1818.

== Places to see ==
The long fortification around the narrow strip of Machi is in good condition. There are caves and rock-cut water cisterns around the Balekilla hill. There is an escape gate which connects the narrow wall of fortification. There are two idols of Sharabh laying near the main gate. The toilet block on the fortification is also seen. There is cannon on the western side of balekilla.

== How to reach ==
There are regular state transport buses and private vehicles which run between Roha and Ghosale. The path from the temple goes straight to the main entrance of the fort. The trek route is of 15 minutes. There is a path that goes around the baklekilla but is very narrow and slippery. There is no place for a night halt on the fort.

== Gallery ==
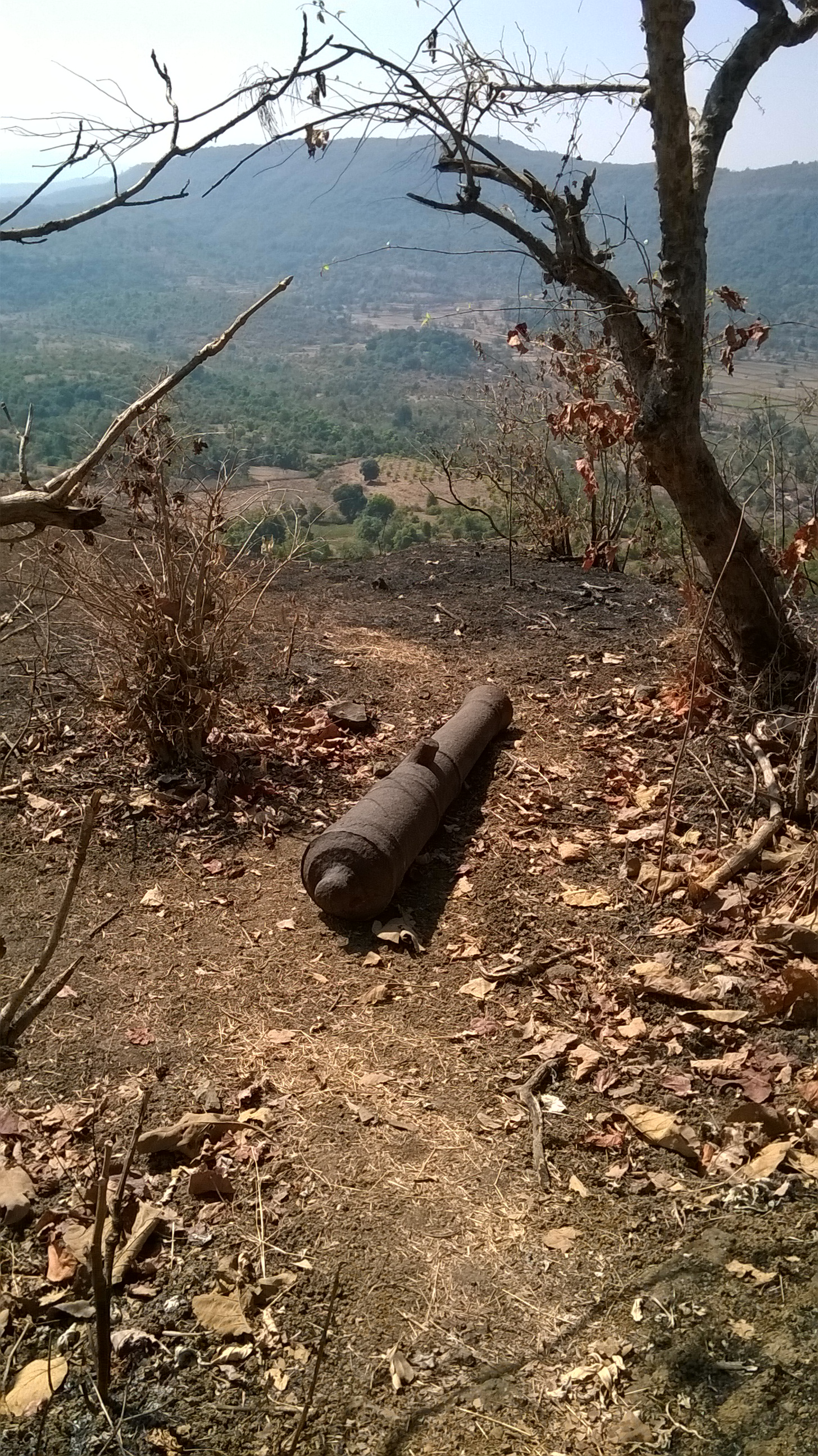
Cannon on the fort

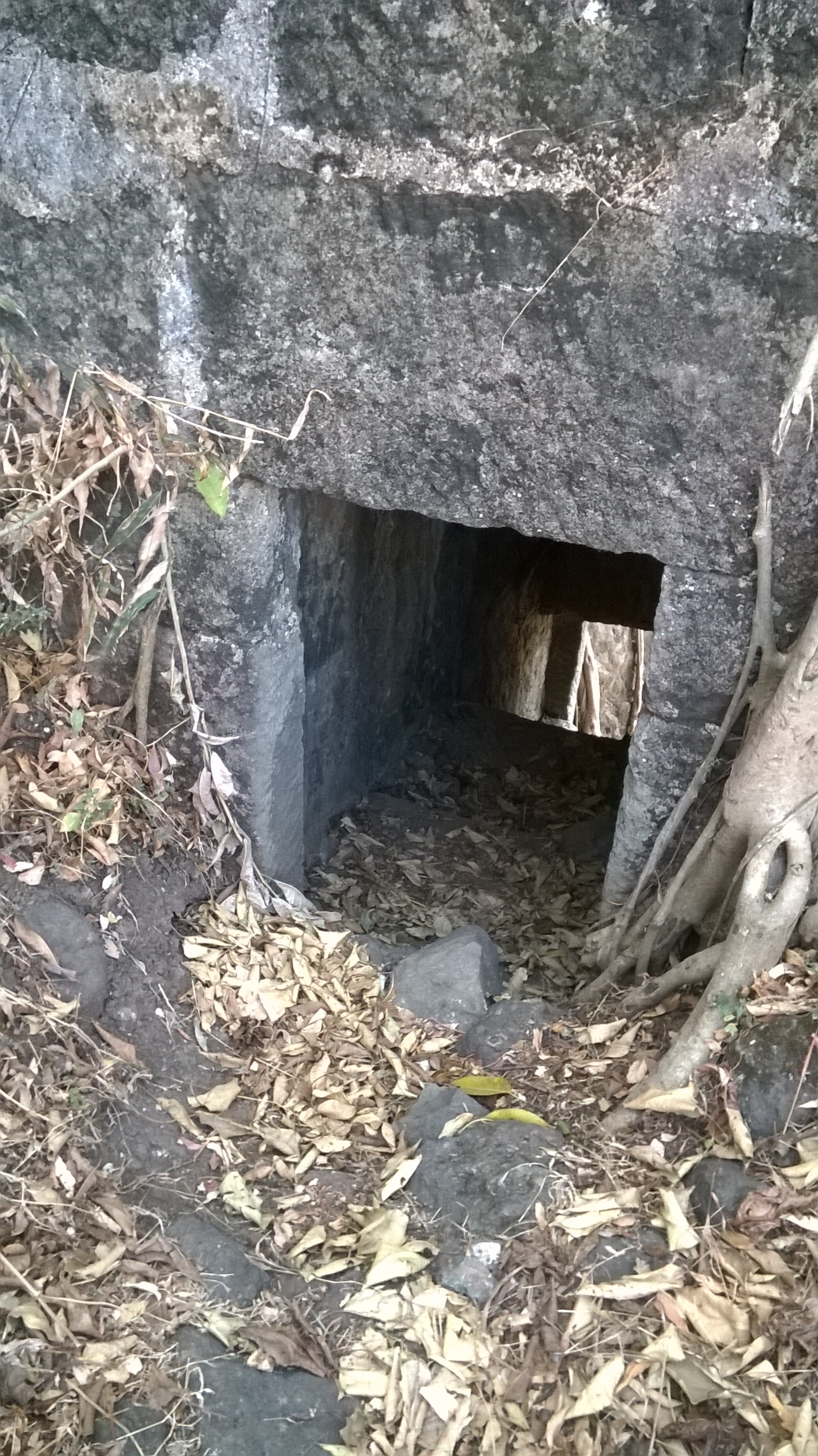
Escape gate

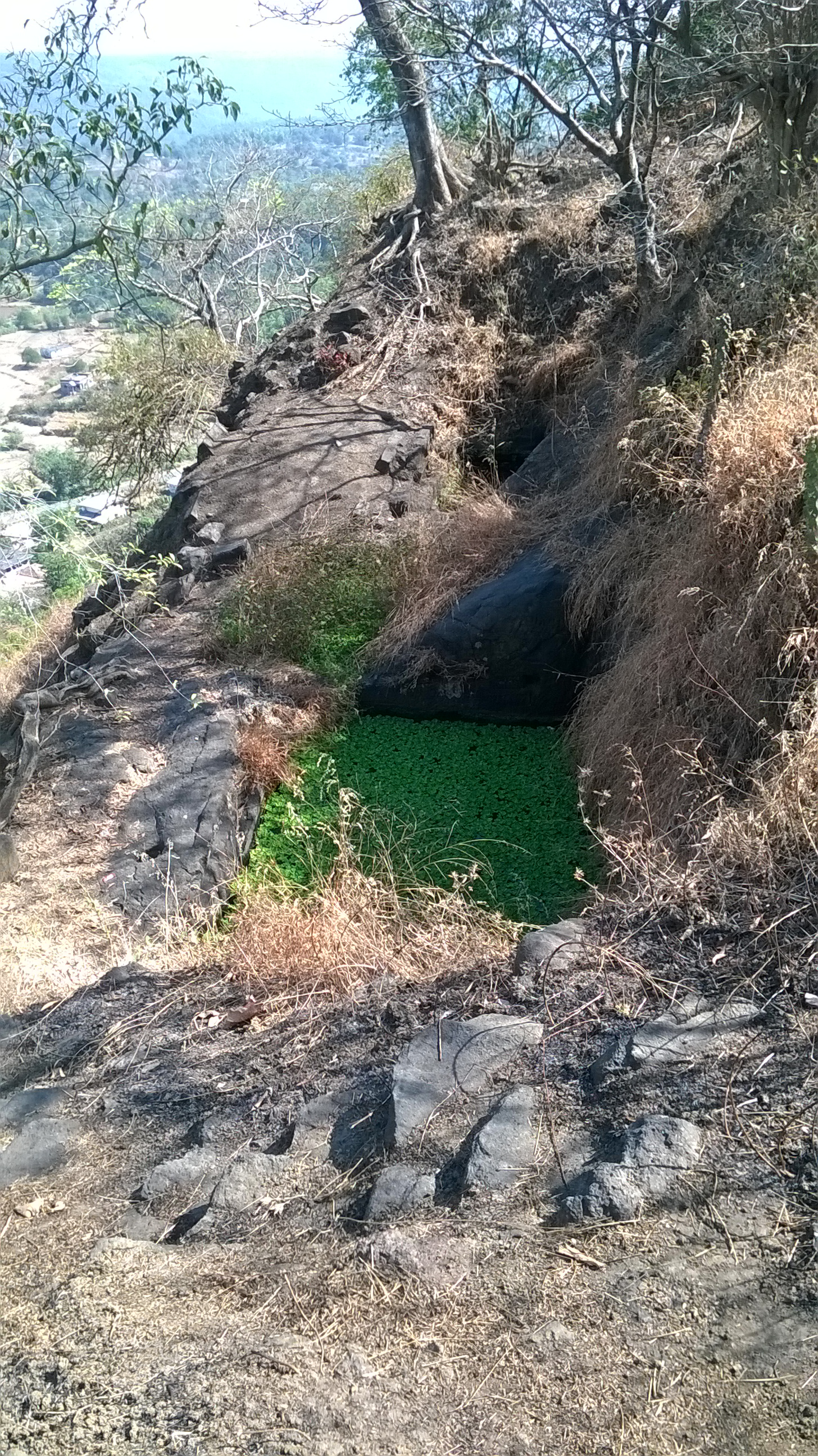
Rock cut water cistern

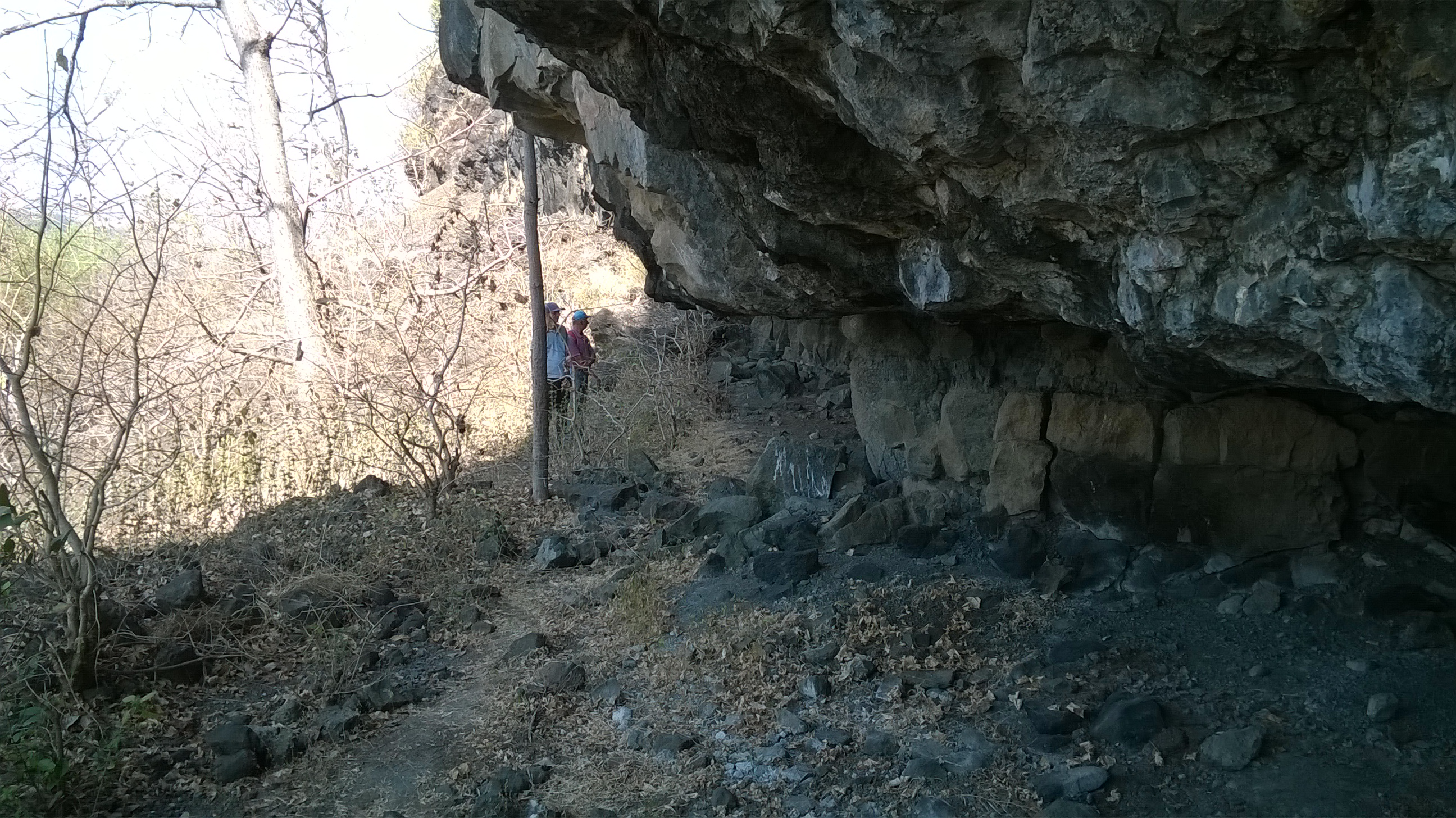
Cave on the fort

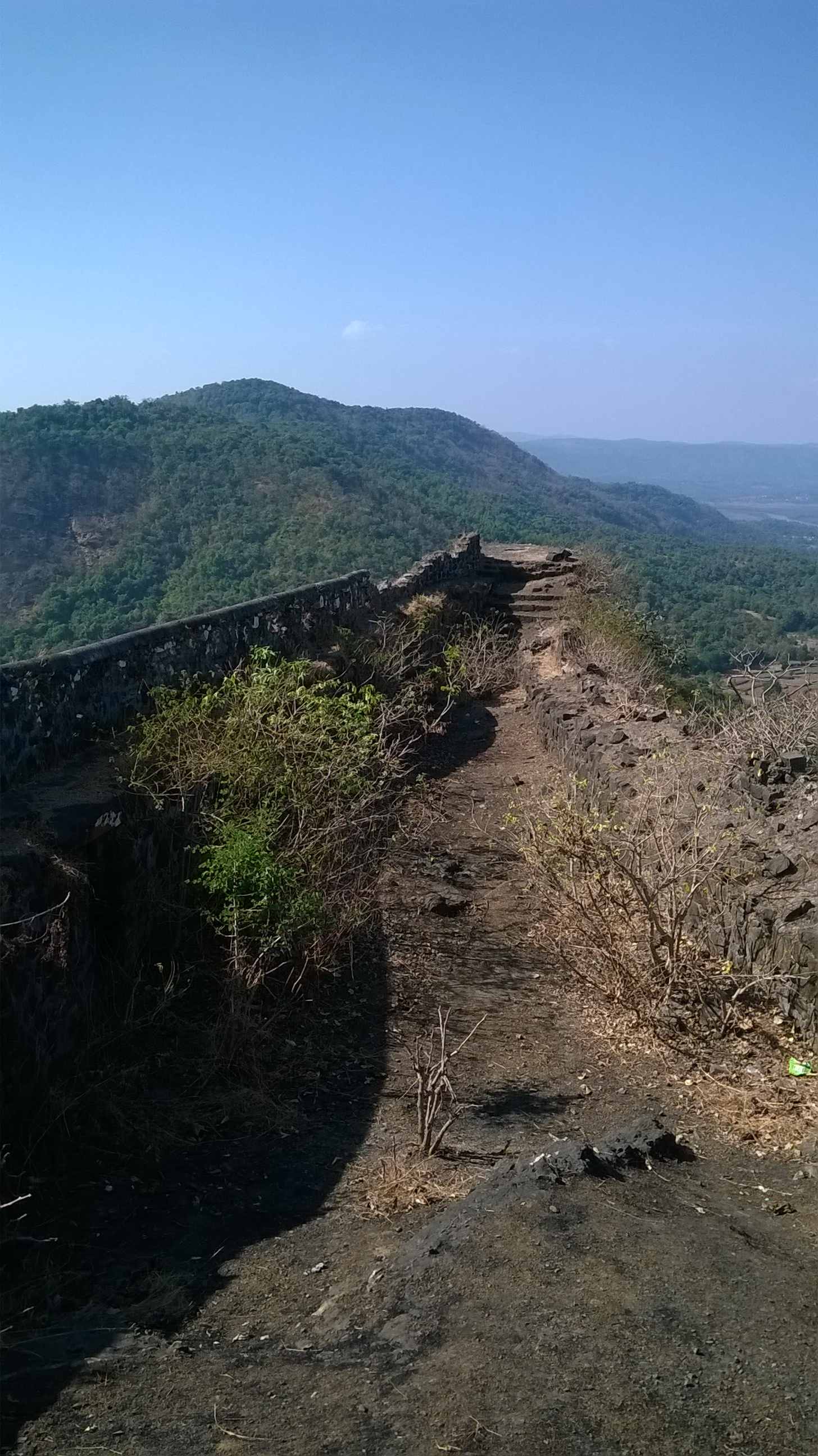
Fort wall
