= Sath Kabar =

Monument in Karnatak

Coordinates: 16.8339°N 75.6761°E

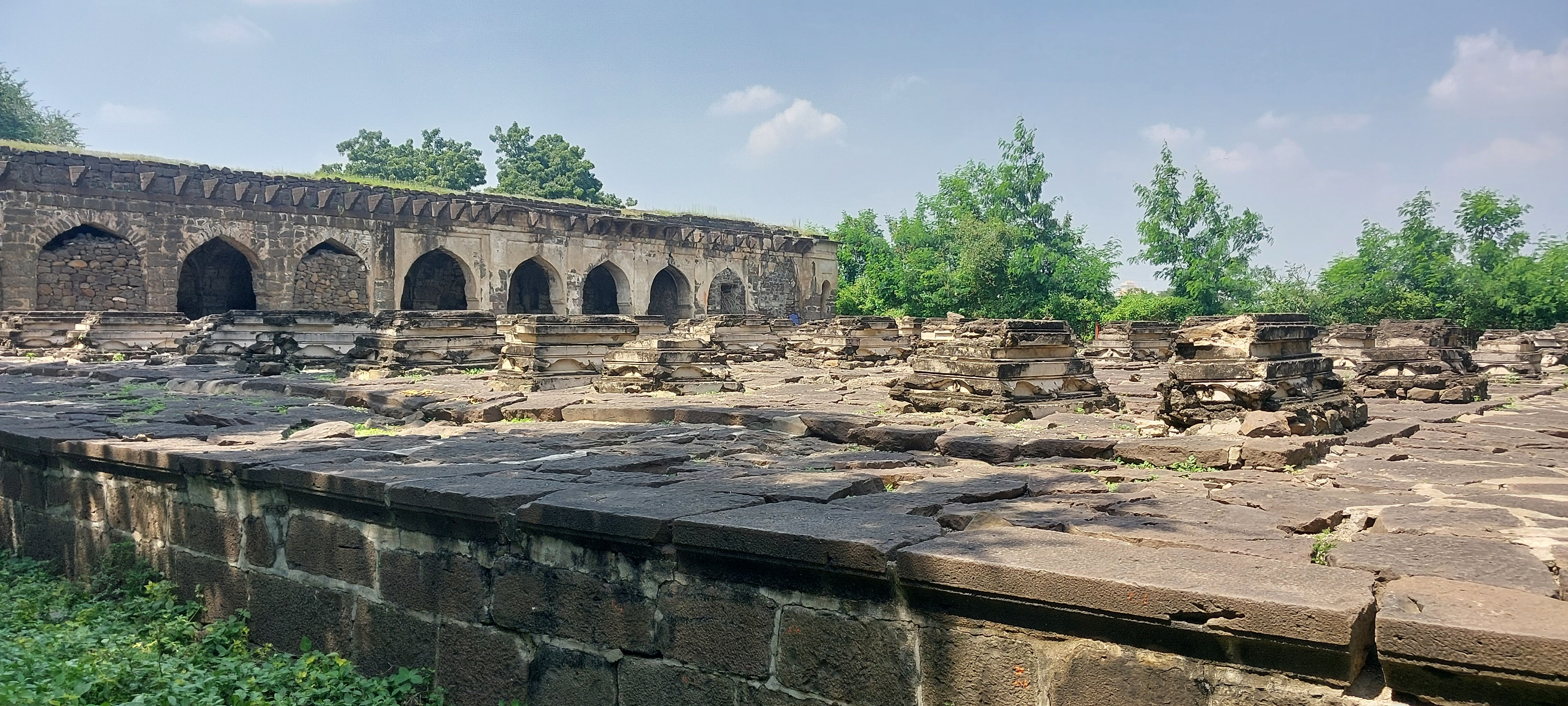
Saath Kabar, the historical graveyard at Afzalpur, Bijapur

Sath Kabar (Sixty Graves) also spelled as Saath Kabar or Sat Kabar, is a historic burial monument located at Afzalpur Takke in Bijapur, Karnataka, India. The site consists of 63 or 64 dilapidated tombs arranged on a rocked platform and is traditionally associated with the wives of the Afzal Khan, a general of the Adil Shahi dynasty of Bijapur.

== History ==
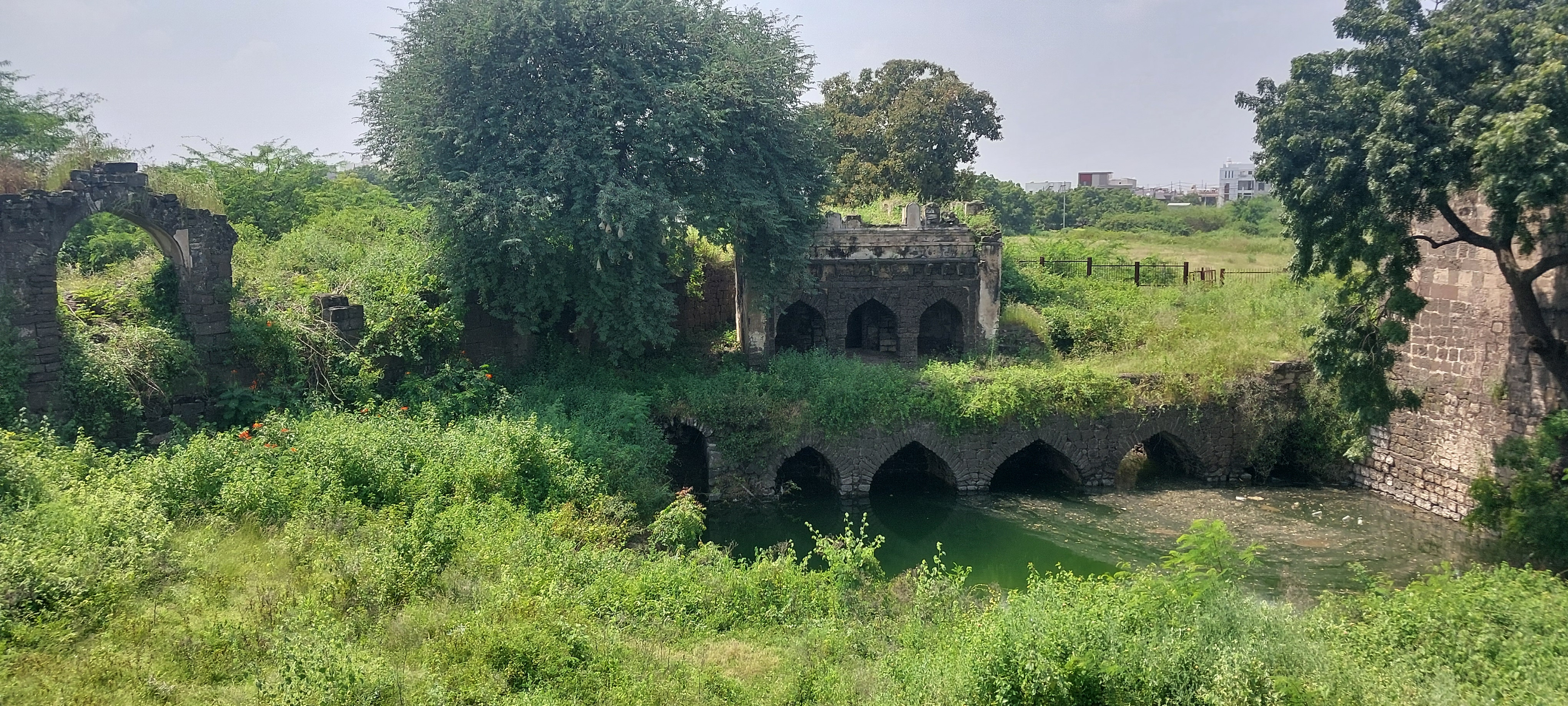
Stepwell near Sath Kabar complex

The monument is named after Afzal Khan, one of the prominent military commander of the Bijapur Sultanate. According to local tradition, before leaving Bijapur in 1659 to confront the Maratha king Shivaji at the Battle of Pratapgad, Afzal Khan was warned by an astrologer or a Sufi saint that he would not survive the mission. Fearing his wives would be dishonoured, he ordered them to be killed. They were allegedly thrown into a nearby stepwell and later buried at the present site. These graves commonly known as Sath Kabar or Saath Kabar maintained by Archaeological Survey of India. The stepwell located adjacent to the tombs forms part of the traditional narrative. In a parallel thought, there is no evidence to support the claim that Afzal Khan murdered all his wives or this is their burial site. Few historians dismissed the popular myth as baseless and has no credible historical text.

== See also ==
- Battle of Pratapgad
- Gol Gumbaz
- Ibrahim Rauza
