= Vijayanagara coinage =

Coinage in southern India, 1336–1646 and beyond

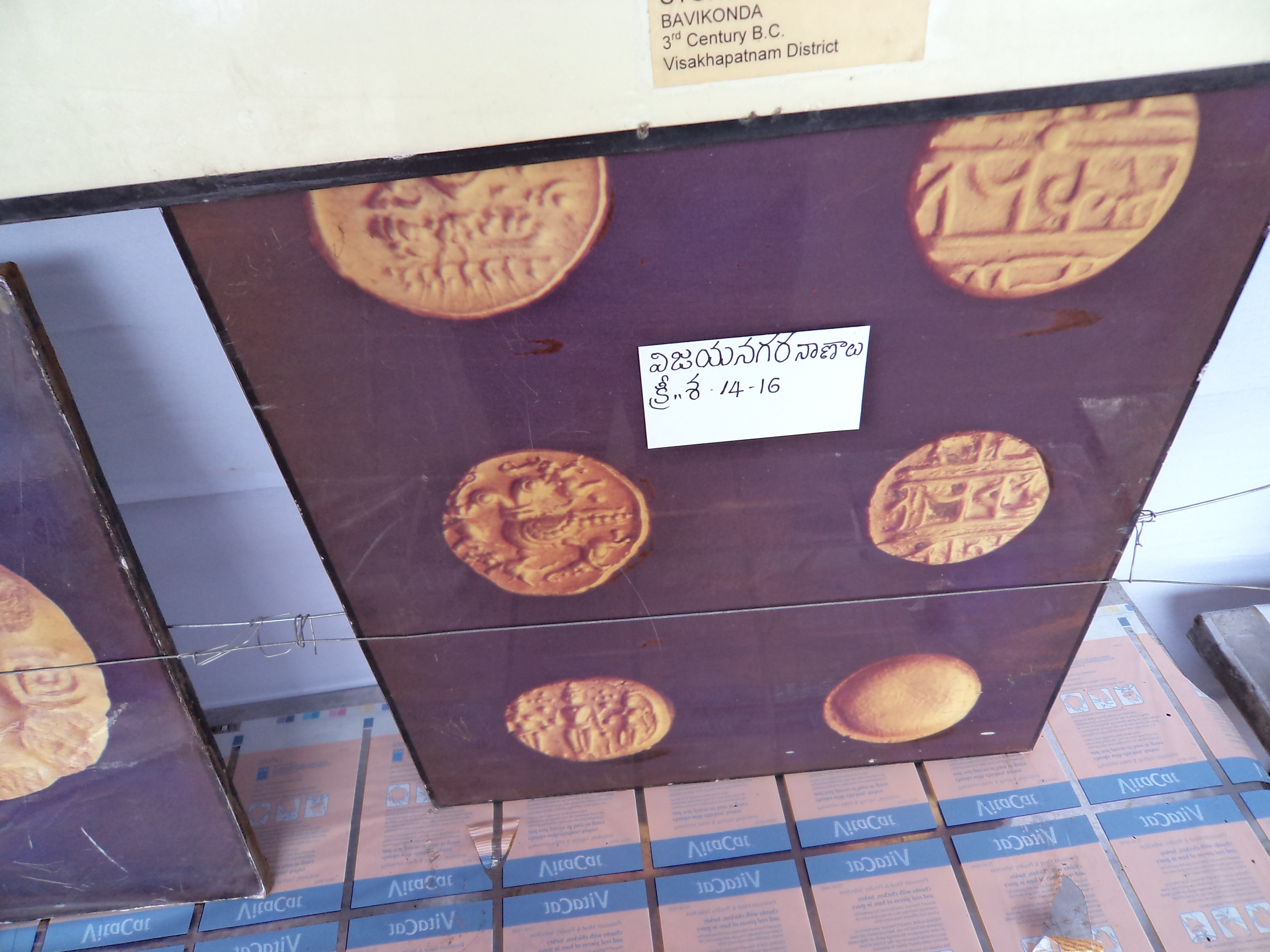
Coins of the Karnata Empire on display

The Vijayanagara Empire from 1336–1646, was situated in Southern India and had a complex currency system that was used even after they ceased to exist.

The standard unit of coin issued by the Karnata Empire was the gold Pagoda or Varaha of 3.4g. The Varaha was also called the Honnu, Gadyana or a Ponnu and came in the Ghattivaraha, Doddavaraha and Suddhavaraha coin. In the gold issue the different coins came in Varaha, this is used as a reference for the other coins values. 1 gold Varaha = 2 Pratapas = 4 Katis = 8 Chinna = 4 Haga = 2 Bele. 1 Hana or Varaha equaled 16 tara silver coins, with the 1 Tara to 3 copper Jital. The copper Duggani was equal to 2 copper kani or kakin, 5 Kasu and 10 Ara Kasu. There were also other units of silver and copper based on their relationship with the Pagoda.

Several gold ramatankas (token coins) which feature the scene of Rama's coronation, were also issued in the Vijayanagara Empire. These coins are now used as objects of worship in modern Indian homes.
