= Chitnis Bakhar =

Marathi language biography of Shivaji

- Author: Malhar Ram Rao Chitnis
- Original title: Shakakarte Chhatrapati Shri Shivaji Maharaj yanche Saptaprakaranatmak Charitra
- Language: Marathi
- Subject: Biography of Shivaji
- Genre: Bakhar
- Publication date: 1810-1811
- Publication place: India

Shakakarte Chhatrapati Shri Shivaji Maharaj yanche Saptaprakaranatmak Charitra, better known as Chitnis Bakhar, is a Marathi language biography of Shivaji, the founder of the Maratha Empire. It was written by Malhar Ram Rao Chitnis, whose ancestor Balaji Avaji held the position of Chitnis (head clerk) under Shivaji.

The biography had been ordered to be written by king Shahu II of Satara, but the work was completed after his death in 1808, during 1810–1811. The author wrote seven bakhars (chronicles) in total, including six biographies of the Maratha kings (chhatrapatis), and a treatise on political diplomacy.

Chitnis Bakhar is not arranged chronologically, and does not cite any sources. The text glorifies Shivaji with narratives of his early life, but these narratives are not substantiated by other sources. Historian Jadunath Sarkar dismissed it as unreliable for the purposes of history, stating that "the book is incorrect, rambling or pure guess work in many places, with not even the idea of correct chronology."

== See also ==
- Khando Ballal, the great-grandfather of the author Malhar Ram Rao

== See also ==
- Khando Ballal, the great-grandfather of the author Malhar Ram Rao
