= Shiva Digvijaya =

Biography of Shivaji (b.1630)

- Author: Anonymous; attributed to Khando Ballal Chitnis by 19th-century editors
- Original title: Shri-Shiva-Digvijaya
- Language: Marathi
- Subject: Biography of Shivaji
- Genre: Bakhar
- Publication place: India

Shri-Shiva-Digvijaya (IAST: Śrī-Śiva-Digvijaya) is a Marathi language biography of Shivaji, the founder of the Maratha Empire. The title of the text is also transliterated as Shiva-digvijay and Shiv-digvijay because of schwa deletion.

The text is an anonymous work, but L. K. Dandekar and P. R. Nandurbarkar - who edited it in 1895 - attributed its authorship to Khando Ballal (1718), the son of Shivaji's secretary Balaji Avji. Historians such as Jadunath Sarkar and Surendra Nath Sen reject this attribution, and consider the text to be a modern forgery. Astronomer S. B. Dixit dated the text to 1818 - a century later than the year that Dandekar and Nandurbarkar date it to.

Sarkar theorizes that the text was forged by a writer of Kayastha Prabhu caste to glorify the Kayasthas as Shivaji's greatest and most loyal supporters. According to him, the text published by Dandekar and Nandurbarkar is a modern work, although its core portion may have been a lost work composed during 1760-1775.
