= Surgad =

Hill fort in Maharashtra, India

Surgad Fort
- Raigad district, Maharashtra; Near Vaijanath
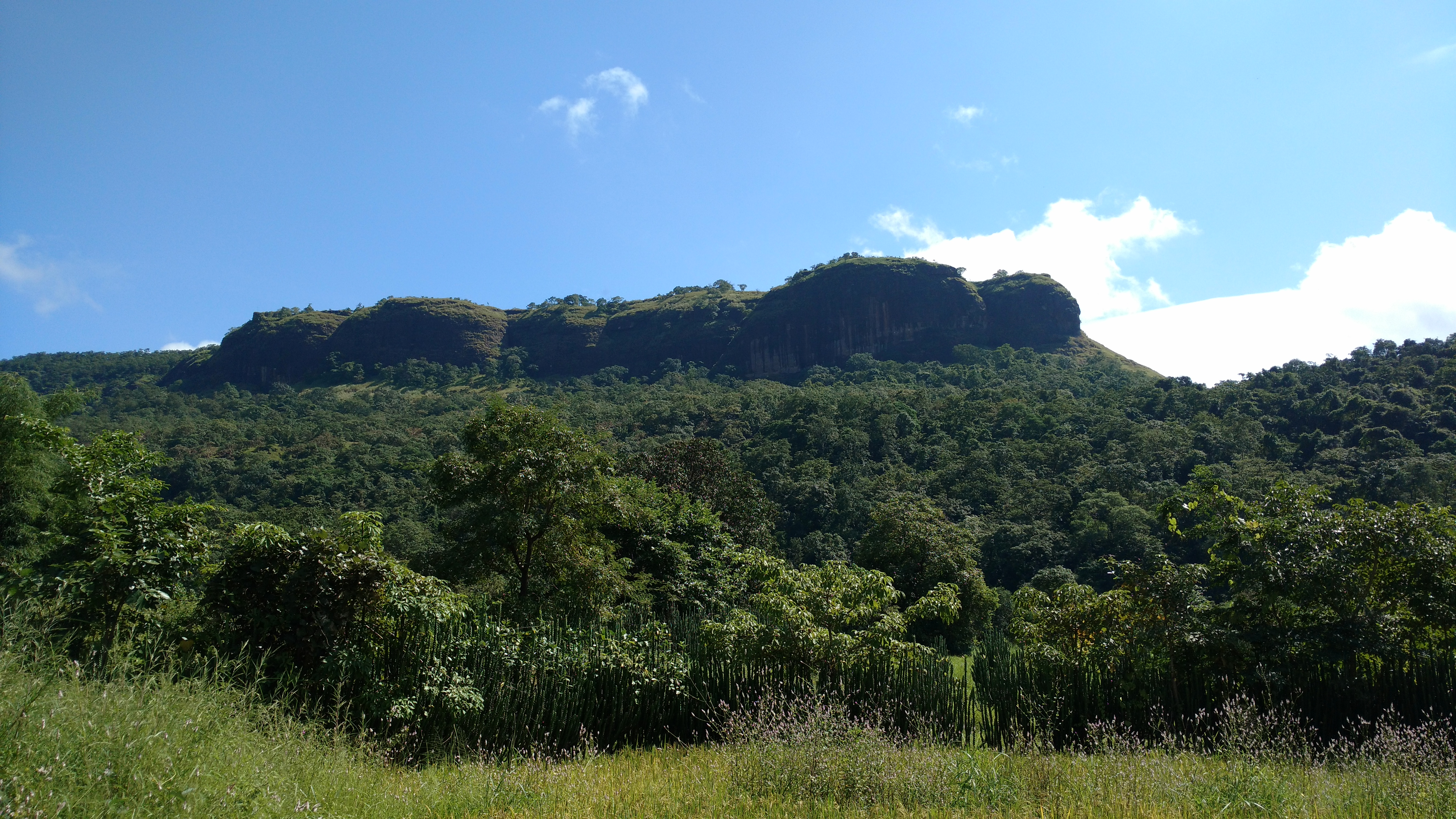
- Fort from village Vaijanath.

Site information
- Type: Hill fort
- Owner: Government of India
- Open to the public: Yes
- Condition: Ruins

Location
- Shown within Maharashtra
- Coordinates: 18°27′12.2″N 73°13′34.2″E
- Height: 825m This value needs verification. It should be around 280m. Compare Google map terrain data.

Site history
- Materials: Stone

Surgad
- Difficulty: Easy

Surgad (lit. “Gods Fort”), is a hill fort located in a spur, fragmented from the Sahyadri ranges of Maharashtra. The fort is situated near Roha, next to the village of Vaijanath in the Raigad district. This fort was an observation fort, which guarded the trade route along the Kundalika river from Sudhagad to Revdanda fort.

== History ==
This fort is believed to be built by Shilahar kings and subsequently used by the Nizam of Ahmednagar. The great Maratha king Chhatrapati Shivaji is also believed to have reconstructed this fort. During Rajaram's regime this fort was captured by Shankarji Narayan Sachiv from the Siddi of Janjira. In 1733 again this fort was captured by Senior Bajirao I. During Peshwa period this fort was used to keep prisoners. There is a block of stone with inscriptions in Farsi (Persian) and Devnagari. The inscription records that the fort was built in the beginning of the second year of the command of Sidhi saheb. The architect was Nuryaji and the Governor of the fort was Tukoji Haibat. It seems that the fort was built at times when use of artillery was not known in battle. In the Third Anglo-Maratha War, along with other forts in the neighboring region.this fort was won over by Colonel Prother from the Peshwas in February 1818.

== Places to visit ==
The fort is like a small spur running south from the main hill range. There are 17 rock cut cisterns on the fort. However, the water from the cistern which is on the North-Eastern side is potable. A small temple of the Veer Maruti is also situated atop. The main gate is not in good condition. There is one cannon on the plateau at the base of the fort. There are two good bastions, one at the northern end and the other at the southern end. There are two dilapidated buildings on the fort namely Sadar and daru-kothar. There is a temple of Ansai Devi near the base of the fort.

There is a dense teak and Dhawda forest around the entire fort.

== See also ==
- List of forts in Maharashtra
- Roha

== Gallery ==
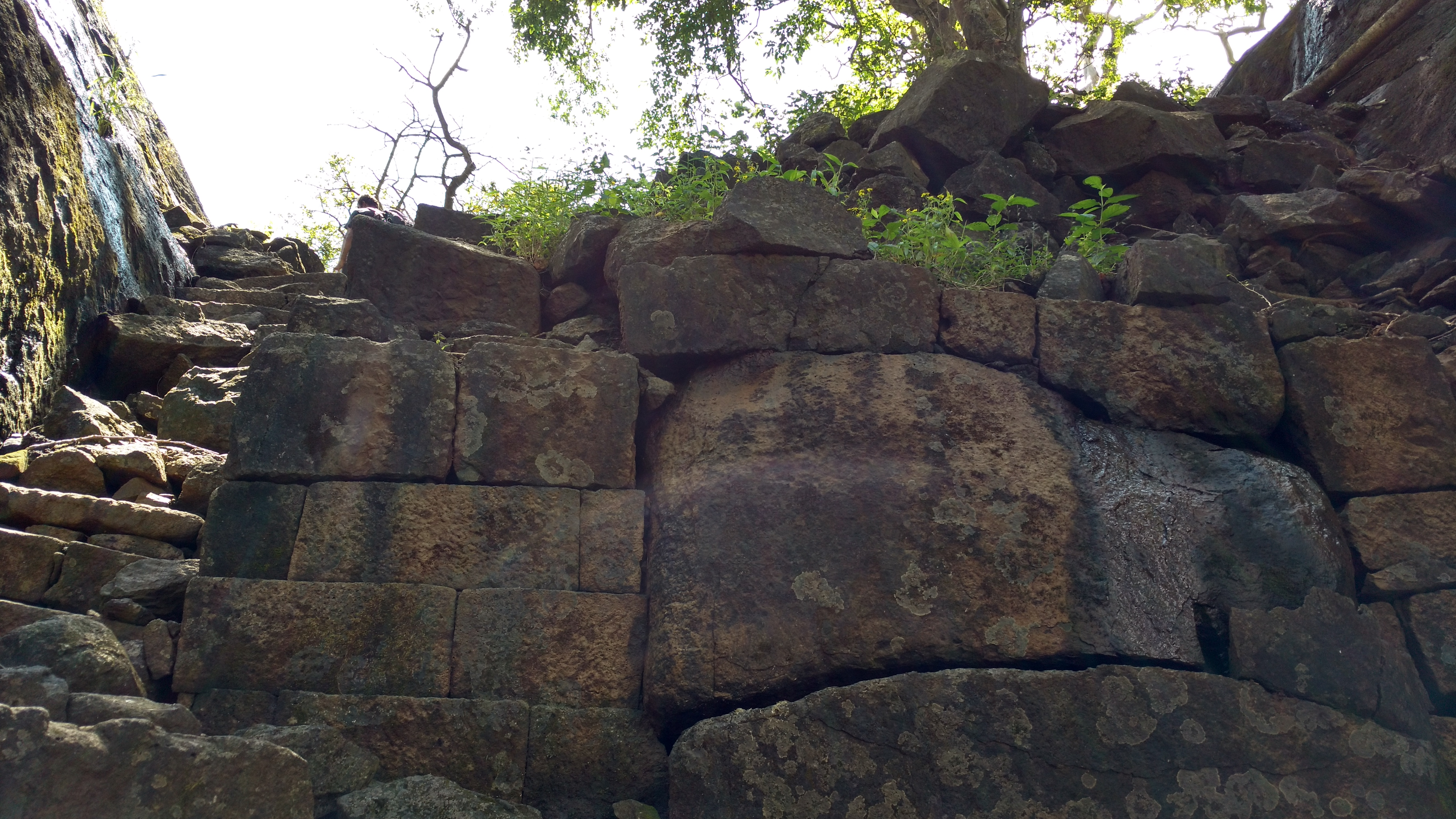
Entrance gate

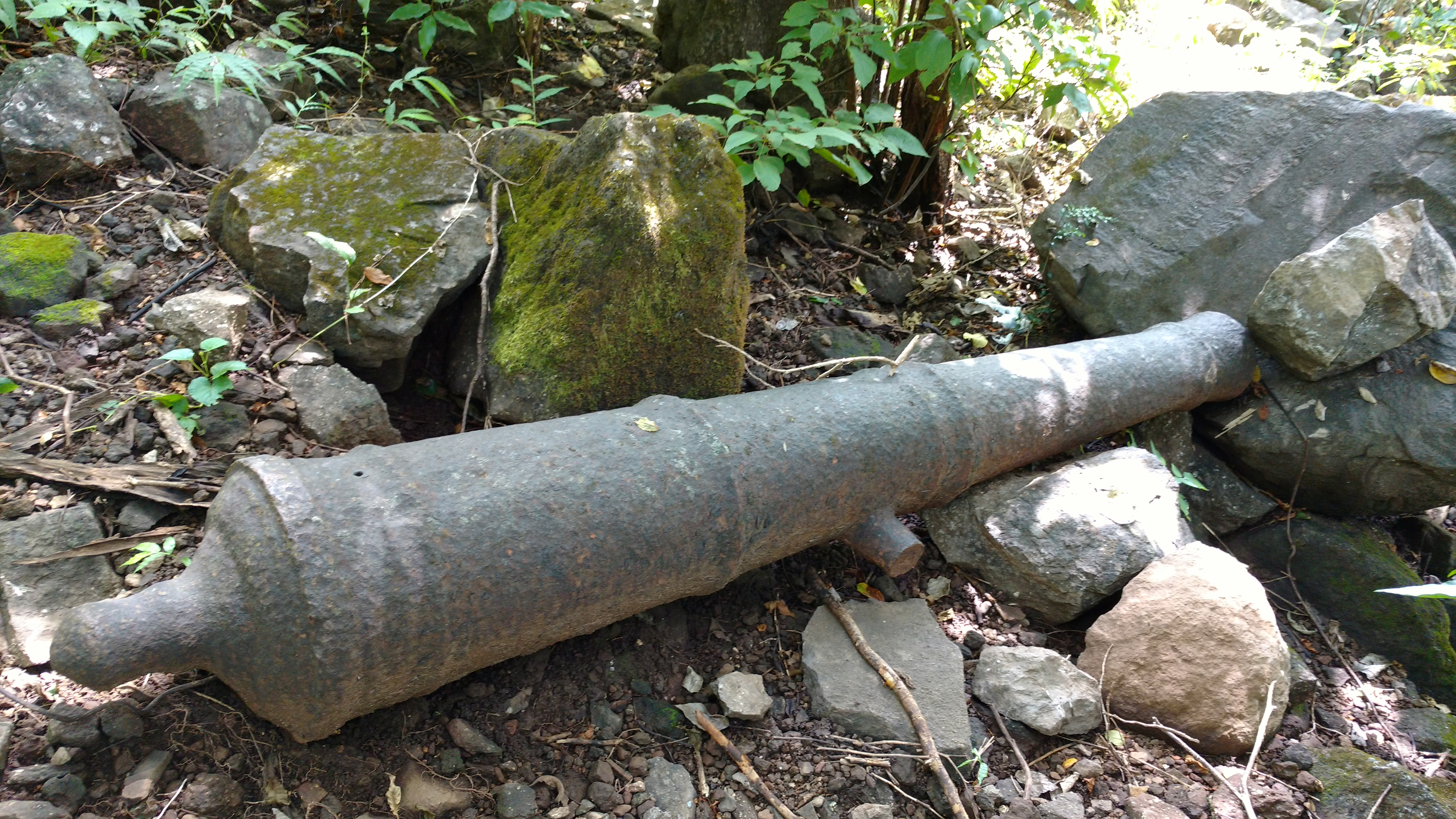
Cannon near the fort

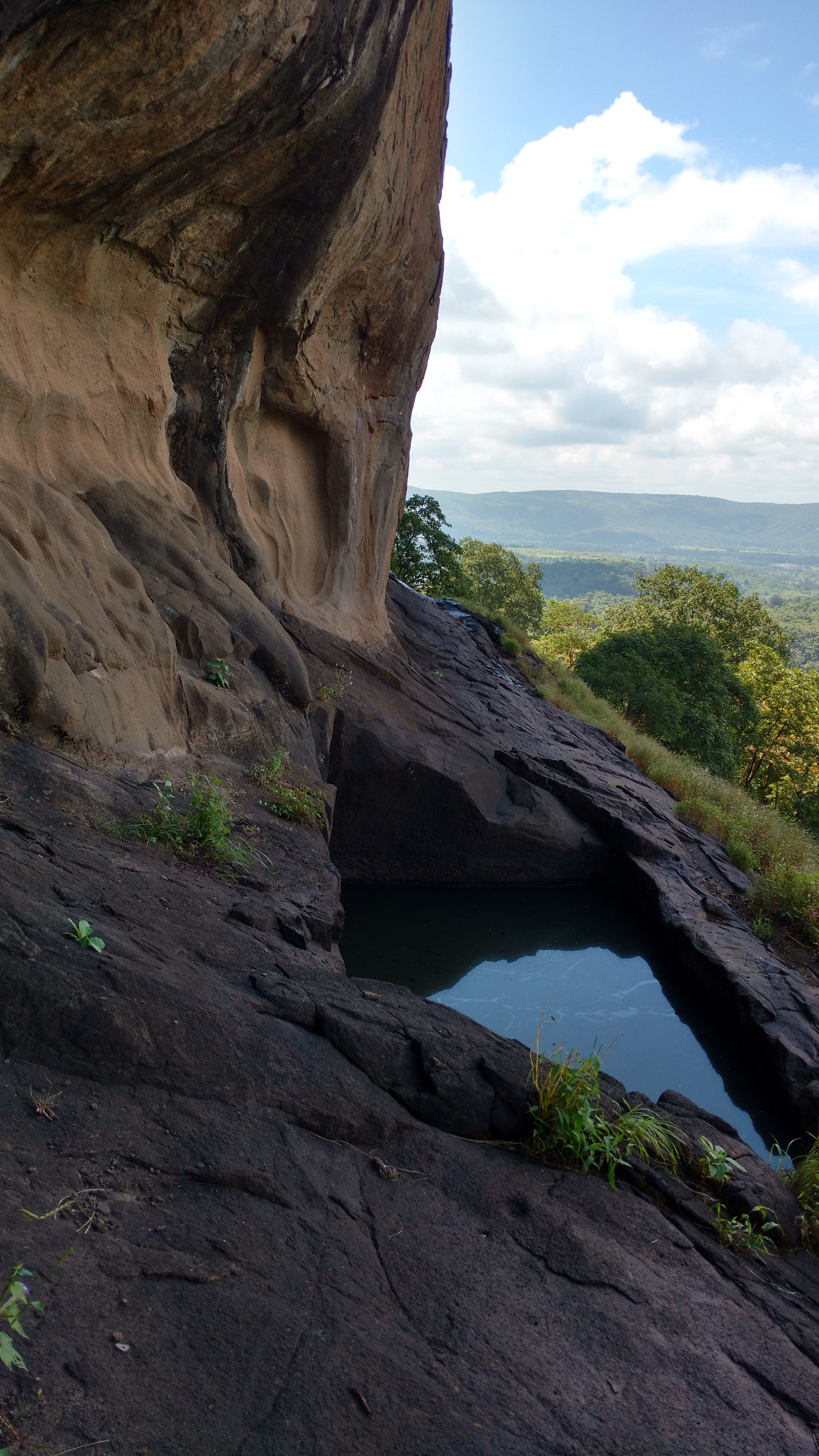
Rock cut cistern

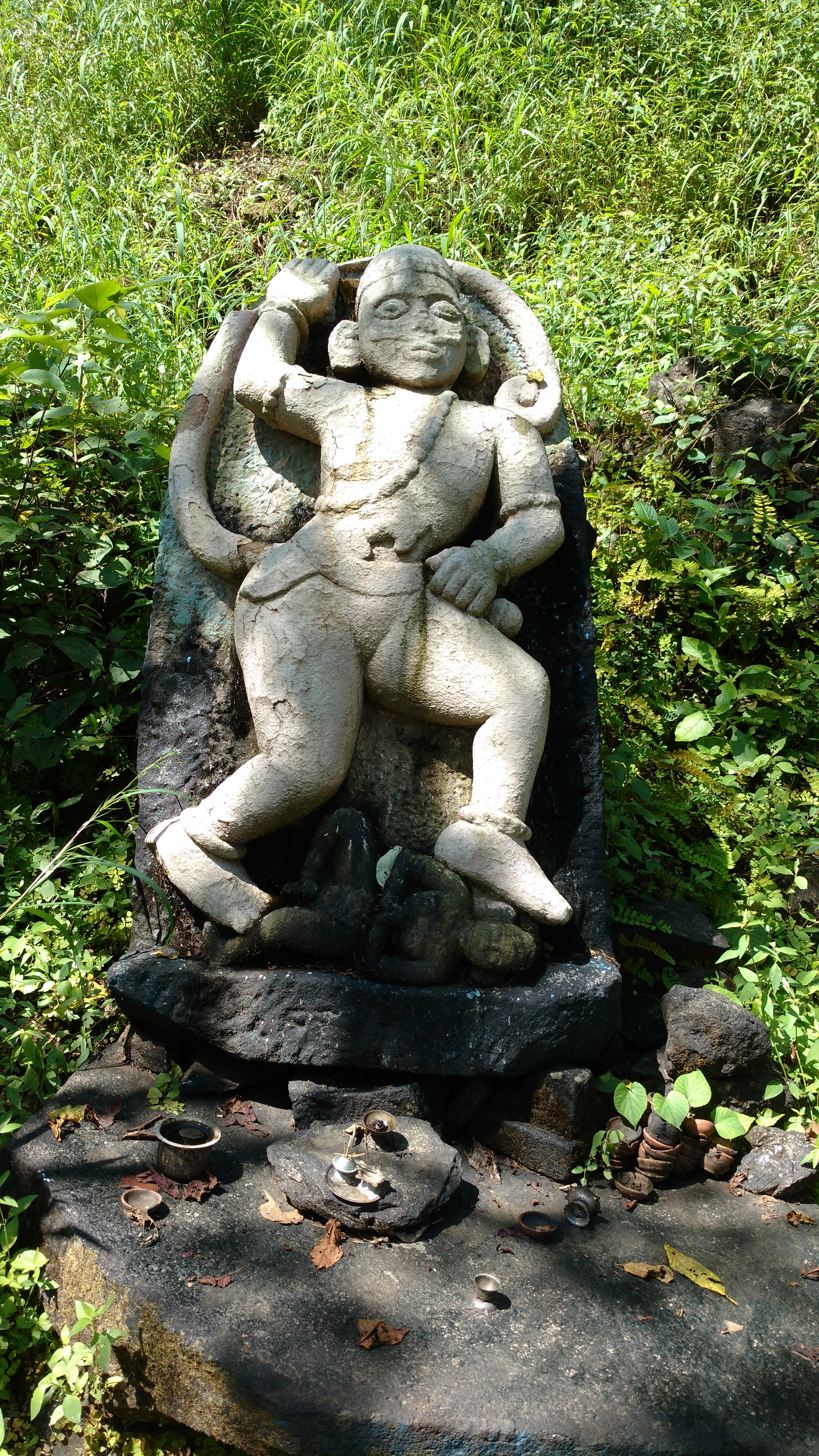
Temple on the fort

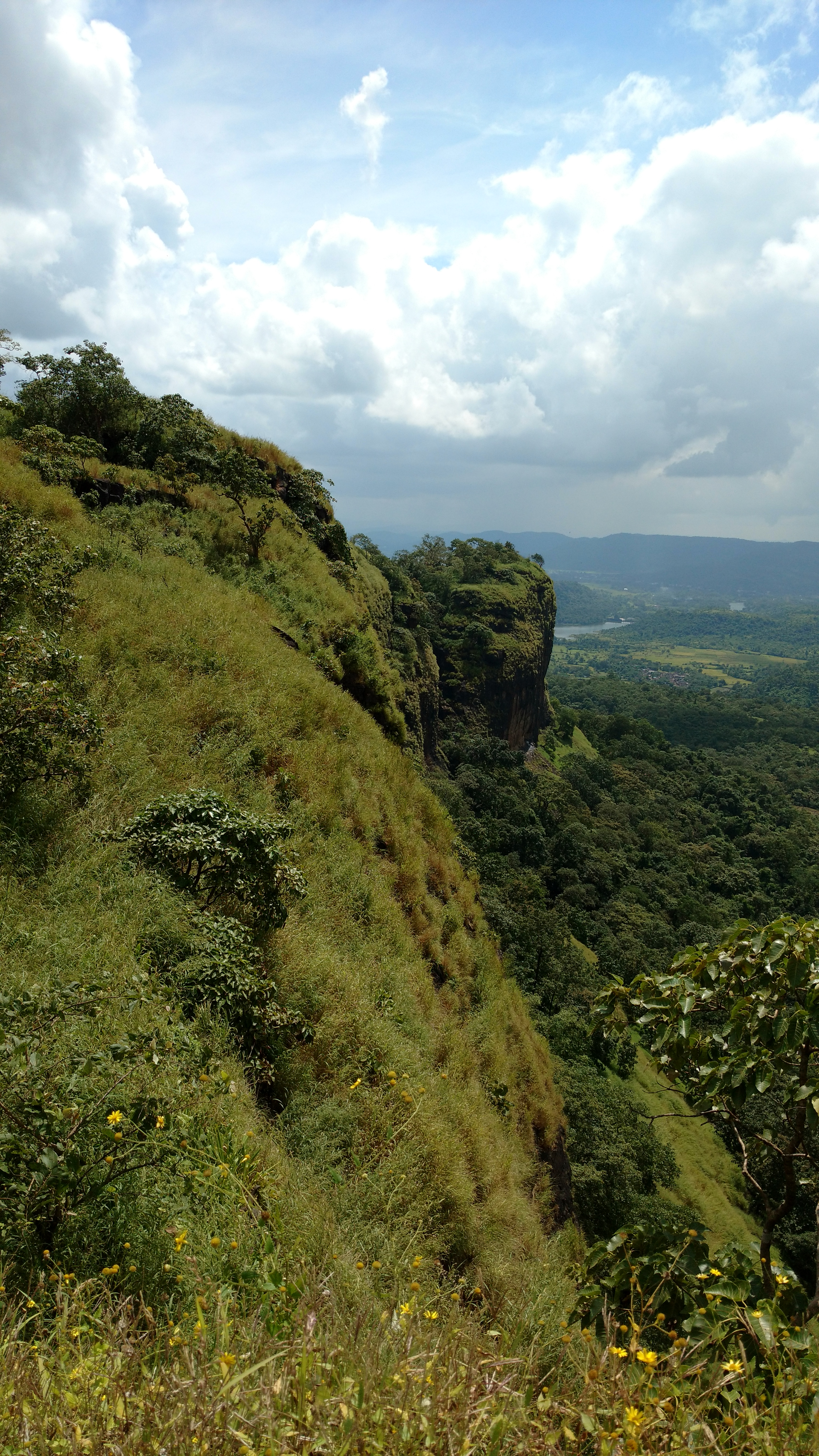
Surgad western slope

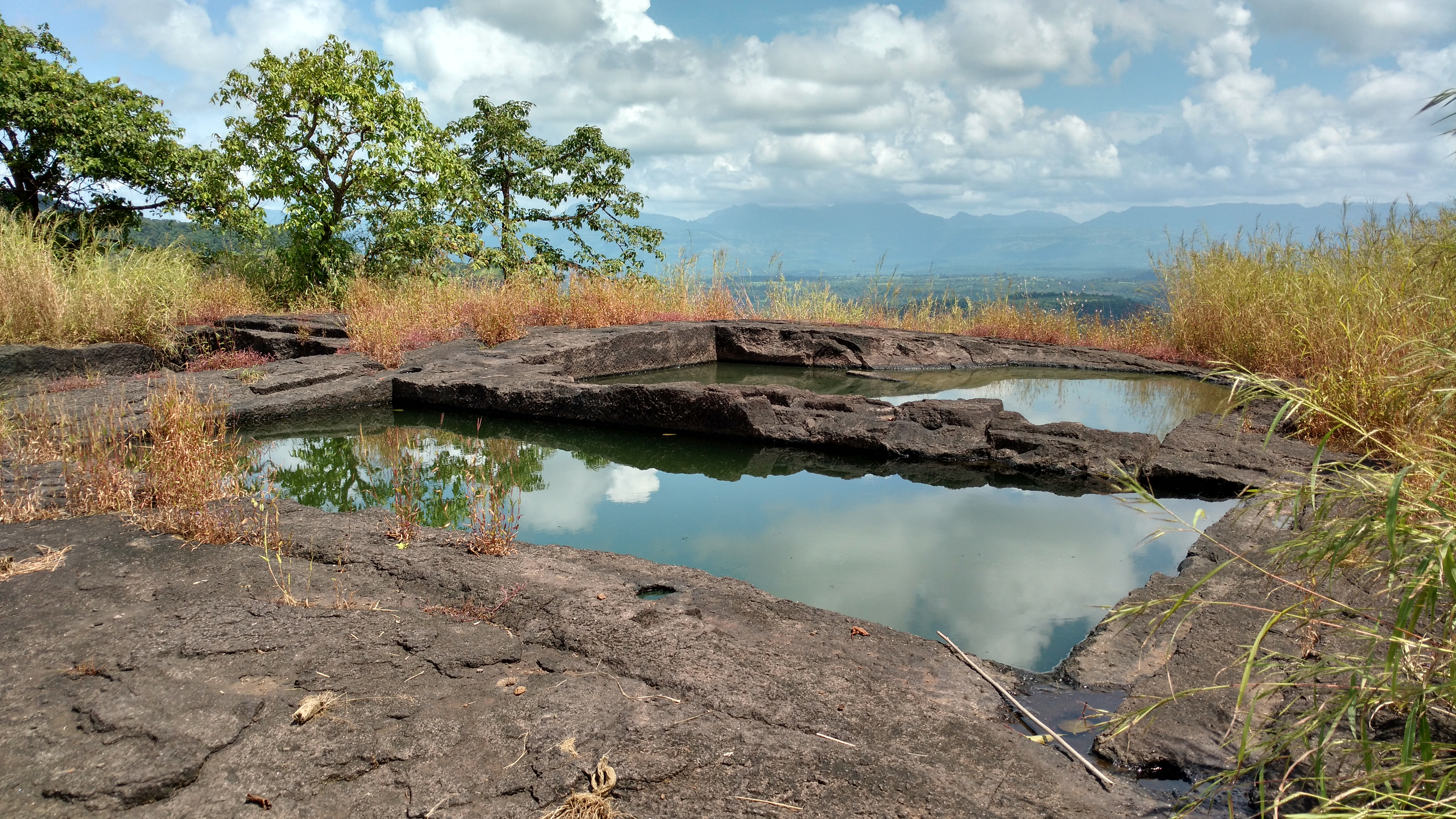
Rock cut water cisterns on the fort

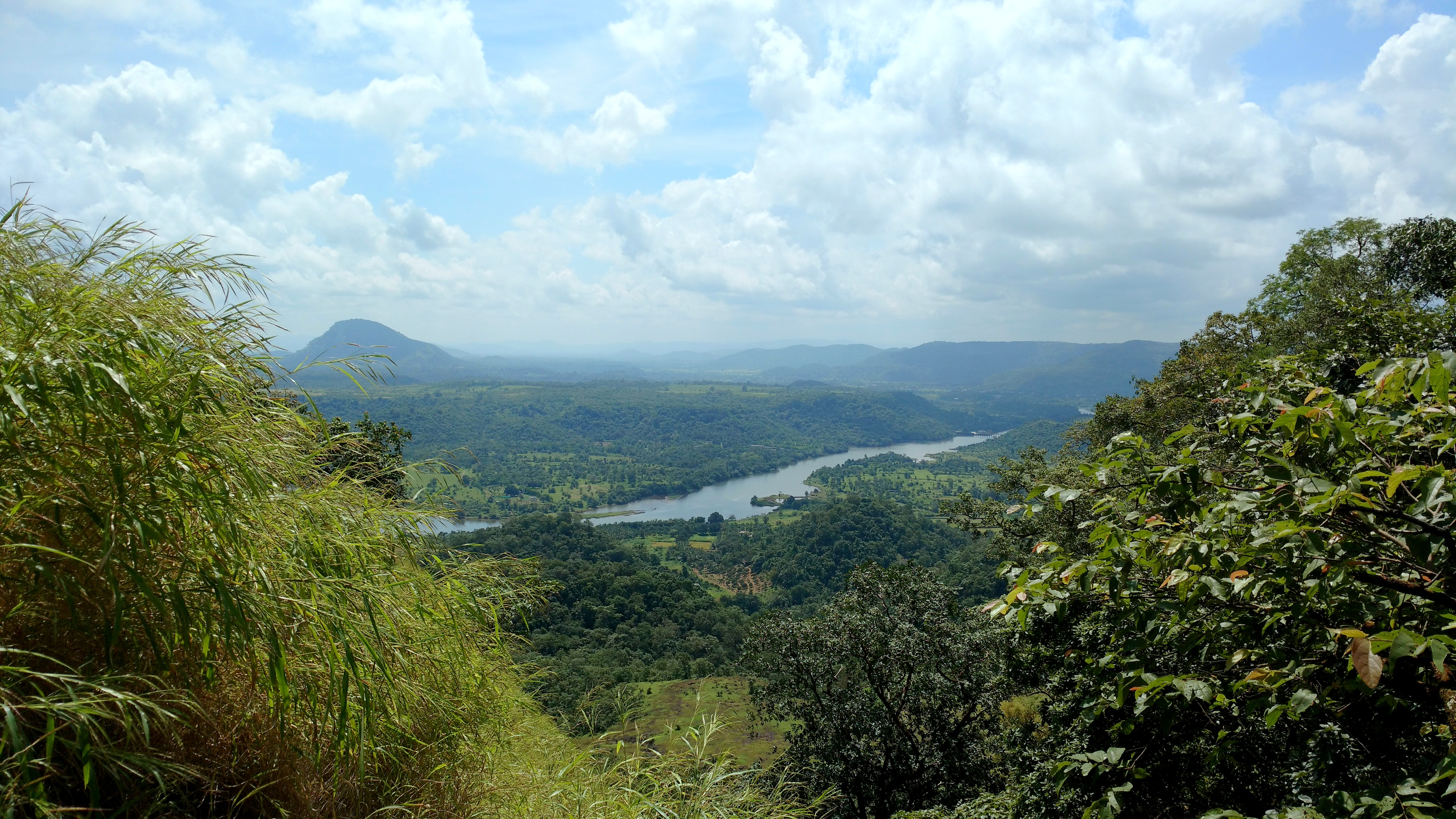
Kundalika river from the fort
