= John Fryer (travel writer) =

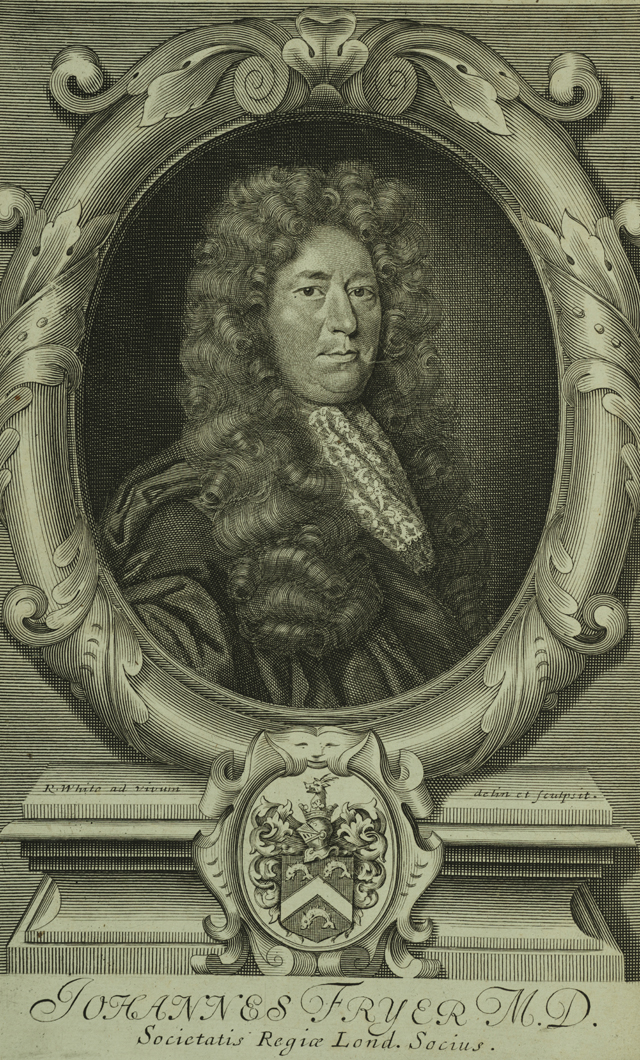
John Fryer, from the frontispiece to his New Account

John Fryer FRS (circa 1650 – 31 March 1733) was an English medical doctor and Fellow of the Royal Society, now best remembered for his descriptions of travel in Persia and India.

== Life ==
Fryer was the oldest son of William Fryer of London. On 13 July 1664, he matriculated at Trinity College, Cambridge, from which he graduated as a Bachelor of Medicine in 1671, then becoming a Fellow-Commoner at Pembroke College, Cambridge on 23 July the same year. In 1672 he was appointed as a surgeon for the British East India Company, to be paid "50s. per month to commence at his arriveall", and on 9 December 1672 sailed from Gravesend on the Unity. While en route, at Johanna (Nzwani) in the Comoro Islands, he made important observations concerning the antiscorbutic qualities of oranges and limes. He arrived on 26 June 1673 at Masulipatnam (now Machilipatnam), the earliest English settlement on the Coromandel coast, and sailing onwards from there to Madras, ultimately arrived at Bombay one year after leaving England.

Fryer remained in the east for eight years, returning to England in August 1682, where he married and had at least one daughter, Anna Maria Sanderson. In 1697 he was elected Fellow of the Royal Society, and in 1698 his "Abstract with Some Reflections on a New Account of East-India and Persia" was published in the Society's transactions, the same year as his magnum opus, A new account of East-India and Persia. Fryer died on 31 March 1733 at his Bread Street home in All Hallows parish, London.

Fryer's books provide contemporary accounts of Mughal India, southern India, and Persia, where he visited Isfahan and the southern parts of the country, with accurate observations in geology, meteorology, and natural history.
