= Mangalgad =

Fort in Maharashtra, India

Mangalgad Fort/ Kangori Fort
- Part of Sahyadri Hill Range
- Raigad district, Maharashtra
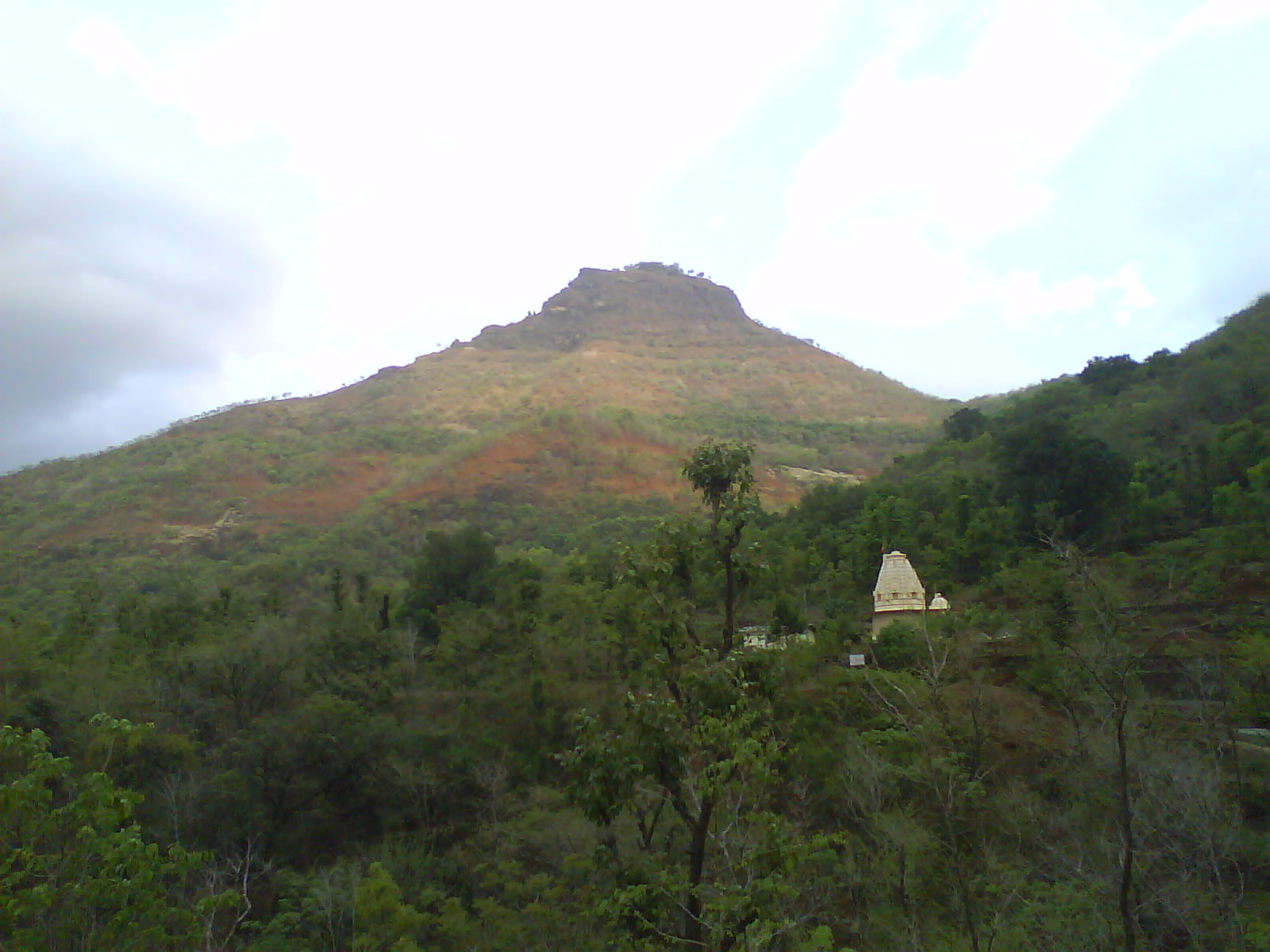
- Kangorigad on the Kangorimal

Site information
- Type: Hill fort
- Owner: Government of India
- Controlled by: Maratha Empire (1656-1689); Moghul Empire(1689-1690); Maratha Empire (1690-1818); United Kingdom: East India Company (1818-1857); British Raj (1857-1947); India (1947-)
- Open to the public: Yes
- Condition: Ruins

Location
- Shown within Maharashtra Mangalgad Fort/ Kangori Fort (India)
- Coordinates: 18°03′05.5″N 73°34′45.7″E
- Height: 2475 Ft.

Site history
- Materials: Stone

Mangalgad, also known as Kangori, is a fort in Maharashtra near the village of Gogawalewadi. Kangori, or Mangalgad Fort, is in the Mahad sub-division about eleven miles (18 km) east by south from Mahad town.

== How to reach ==
The fort is built on the top of a steep and treeless spur of the Sahyadris, 2,457 feet (749 m) high, and is reached by a narrow and rugged path about two miles long. The fort is 1,485 feet (453 m) from east to west and 264 feet (80 m) from north to south. It takes about 2 hours trekking time to reach the fort from the base village Dudhanewadi.

== History ==
Mangalgad was built by Chandrarao More of Jawli. It was one of seven forts captured by Shivaji in 1648. It was the place of confinement of Chitursing the brother of the Raja of Satara, from 1812 till his death in 1818. In 1817 Cornets Hunter and Morrison, two English officers on the Madras establishment, on their way from Hyderabad to Poona with a small escort were caught at Uruli twenty miles east of Poona, and imprisoned here. Some time after, by Gokhla's orders, they were removed to Vasota in Satara, and, on the destruction of that fort in April 1817, they were restored to freedom. In 1818 Kangori was taken by Colonel Prother, after the fall of Raigad fort.

== Places to see ==
The buildings and the gateway are in ruins but a part of the rampart remains. Within the rampart is a ruined temple and a rock-cut cistern, but no building of any size or interest. Mangalgad consists of a single temple, called Kangori Devi Temple, with cisterns at the top. The wada and prison are both in ruins.

== See also ==
- List of forts in Maharashtra
- List of forts in India
- Baji Prabhu Deshpande
- Marathi People
- Maratha Navy
- List of Maratha dynasties and states
- Maratha War of Independence
- Battles involving the Maratha Empire
- Maratha Army
- Maratha titles
- Military history of India
