= Khando Ballal =

Indian diplomat

Diplomat of Maratha Empire
- Monarch: Sambhaji

Personal details
- Born: 1660
- Died: 1660 (aged 0)
- Occupation: Diplomat

Military service
- Allegiance: Maratha Empire

Khandu , popularly known as ‘Khando Tipnis or Khandu’, was a person in Maharashtra during the late 17th century and the early 18th century.

== Early life ==
Khando Ballal was born around 1660 in a CKP (Chandraseniya Kayastha Prabhu) family. His father, Ballal Avaji, popularly known as ‘Balaji Avaji’, was the Royal Secretary and Right Hand of King Shivaji from 1658 to 1680. Balaji Avaji's clan name was Chitre since they were migrants from Chittore in Rajasthan. However, after being appointed as the chief military and civil advisor of Ch.Shivaji Maharaj.

Under the regime of Ch.Sambhaji Maharaj (2nd king of Maratha empire), Balaji Avaji was executed for conspiring and trying to assassinate Sambhaji. Balaji was punished along with his eldest son for conspiring and trying to go against the kingdom and kill Ch.Sambhaji Maharaj twice, with the main conspirator Annaji Datto and other ministers.

== Contribution ==
Khando Ballal worked for about 8 years until Sambhaji was captured and put to death by Aurangzeb in 1689. After Sambhaji’s death, his brother, Chhatrapati Rajaram, was secretly sent to fort Gingee for his safety and to run operations from there, Ganoji Shirke assisted the Chhatrapati in reaching Gingee safely. Khando Ballal was one of the few who accompanied Rajaram in this hazardous journey.

After reaching Gingee, with the help of Pralhad Niraji, Khando Ballal made tremendous efforts in finding the diplomats and warriors who had vanished on the way and getting them back. He also conspired with Ramchandra Pant Amatya to secretly move the Queens of Rajaram from Maharashtra to Gingee with the help of his maternal uncles Lingoji Shankar and Visaji Shankar Tungare.

For the performance shown during the tough times at Gingee, King Rajaram gave him the vatan of Dabhol in the konkan area of Maharashtra.

== Conspiracy for Rajaram’s Escape ==
In early 1698, when the Mughal army had surrounded fort Gingee and was preparing for the final blow, Maharani Yesubai designed a plot for the escape of Rajaram. He, however, kept his word and helped Rajaram to escape from the blockade and to hand him over to the troops under Maratha General Dhanaji Jadhav by giving up his Dabhol Vatan to Ganoji Shirkhe.

== Later life and death ==
Until the death of Rajaram in 1700, Khando Ballal worked with him not only as his personal assistant, but also as an adviser in confidence. After Rajaram's death, Khando Ballal continued his post as advised by Queen Tarabai until 1707. On the release of Shahu after the death of Aurangzeb in 1707, Khando Ballal was invited by Shahu to join hands. Having sincerely felt that Shahu was the rightful and eligible heir to the throne of Maratha Empire rather than Shivaji II, he accepted Shahu’s invitation. Until his death, he worked as a senior member of the Advisory Committee of Shahu and attained great respect and honour. When Shahu became wild on the so-called betrayal by Parshuram Pant Pratinidhi, one of the great diplomats and warriors of the Maratha Empire, he ordered Parshuram to be arrested at once and blinded. When he came to know about this, Khando Ballal ran to Shahu’s court and requested him to cease with this nonsense. He then reprimanded Shahu for such unfair treatment with a great contributor of the Maratha Empire like Parshuram Pant. Shahu immediately released Parshuram Pant, apologized to him.

Soon after this episode, Khando died, probably in 1712.
