= Khafi Khan =

Civil servant and historian of Mughal India (1664–1732)

- Born: Muhammad Hashim c. 1664; India (probable)
- Died: 1732
- Occupations: Historian, clerk, civil and military official
- Known for: Muntakhab-al Lubab (1731)
- Notable work: Muntakhab-al Lubab
- Title: Khafi Khan, Khwafi Khan, Nizam al-Mulkī

Muhammad Hashim (c. 1664–1732), better known by his title Khafi Khan, was an Indo-Persian historian of Mughal India. His career began about 1693–1694 as a clerk in Bombay. He served predominantly in Gujarat and the Deccan regions, including the final decade of Mughal emperor Aurangzeb. He authored the controversial and in part "patently fictitious" Muntakhab-al Lubab – a Persian language book about the history of India during the Mughal period, completed in 1731. It has been a much studied, contested source of information about the Mughal history, particularly Shah Jahan and Aurangzeb. (Note: There are numerous contested historical statements in Khafi Khan's book where Aurangzeb is praised as the ideal Islamic ruler who, for example, "banned music" from his empire. While this ban is also mentioned by Niccolao Mannuci – the Italian visitor to Aurangzeb's court (1668–1669) in a manner with striking similarities to the one imposed by Taliban, it is disputed if this is historically true or affected India's rich history of music.)

== Biography ==
Muhammad Hashim was given the title Khafi Khan (or Khwafi Khan) by emperor Muhammad Shah, because his ancestors came from Khaf (or Khwaf) in present-day Iran. The exact date and place of his birth are unknown, but he was most probably born in India. The Muntakhab-al Lubab states that he had completed 52 years since reaching "the age of discretion" when 74 years had passed after the death of Shah Jahan's minister Sa'd Allah (Hijri year 1066). Assuming the contemporary "age of discretion" as 14 years, this implies that Khafi Khan was born around 1664.

Khafi Khan's father Khwaja Mir was also a historian, and held a high position under the Mughal prince Murad. Khafi Khan probably started his career as a merchant or an official clerk, and visited Bombay in 1693–1694, where he had an interview with an English official. Khwaja Mir was severely wounded at the Battle of Samugarh. Later, Khwaja Mir served Murad's brother Aurangzeb, and his son Khafi Khan also held various civil and military assignments during the reign of Aurangzeb (1658-1707).

Khafi Khan served Aurangzeb's successors, including the short-lived reigns of Bahadur Shah, Farrukhsiyar, and Muhammad Shah. He lived in Deccan and Gujarat, spending a long time at Surat. He also lived at Ahmedabad, Rahuri, and Champaner (whose governorship he held during the reign of Bahadur Shah). He was granted the title Hāshim ʿAlī Khān, with Muhammad Shah further ennobling him as Khvāfī Khān Niẓām al-Mulkī.

Khafi Khan's title Nizam al-Mulki suggests that during his last years, he served Nizam-ul-Mulk, Asaf Jah I, a Mughal nobleman who established the Hyderabad State. He was a close friend of Shah Nawaz, another courtier of Asaf Jah I and the author of Ma'asir al-umara.

== Legacy ==
Introduction to Awrangzib

In enforcing the precepts (ahkam) of Islam
and strengthening the firm Faith of Muhammad and
carrying out the divine commands and prohibitions,
he has taken such strong action that the
reputation of his good name and his support of
the Faith have rubbed the advice-accepting
ears of the rulers of the seven climes.

— Muntakhab-al Lubab, Khafi Khan
Translator: Syed Moinul Haq

Khafi Khan's Muntakhab-al Lubab has been a much studied text in the modern era. It covers events up to the beginning of the 14th year of Muhmmad Shah's reign, that is, about 1731–1732. According to M. Athar Ali, the manuscripts of Khafi Khan's works discovered later and the manuscripts of other Mughal era historians shows that this book incorporates without acknowledgment the work of other Muslim authors with pen names Sadiq Khan and Abu'l Fazl Ma'muri on emperors Shah Jahan and Aurangzeb, in a manner that would be "regarded as gross plagiarism" in modern era scholarship. The identity of the original authors behind the pen names is not known and their credibility is difficult to gauge.

In the first version of Khafi Khan's work (MSS 6573 and 6574 in British Library), the wholesale copying of patently fictitious material is most apparent. His last version – published by K.D. Ahmad in 1874 – removed most of the personal details of other authors whose work he embedded in his text, condensed what he had plagiarized, altered the opinions to the narrative he preferred, changed the version of the history of previous authors, then "substantially added to the narrative of the later years of Aurangzeb's reign", states Ali. Large sections of Khafi Khan's Muntakhab-al Lubab, including those about the Aurangzeb period – such as the campaign in Bijapur – are plagiarized and "hopelessly incorrect", says historian A.J. Syed.

The above views of Athar Ali and Syed follow those published earlier by colonial era scholars such as Ram Sharma. According to Sharma, writing in 1936, of all historical records available from late 17th-century and early 18th-century, Khafi Khan's work has been given the "place of honor" in the colonial era historiography on Mughal period and particularly Aurangzeb. However, states Sharma, Khafi Khan was "one of the biggest imposters among historians". Khafi Khan writes in as if he is the eyewitness, when he was not present – and could not have been present – anywhere near the events or Aurangzeb. He claims to have found defects in Alamgir Nama of Muhammad Kazim that "closes with the 10th year of Aurangzeb's reign" around the time Khafi Khan was a few years old and could not possibly have a way of knowing anything about Aurangzeb firsthand. Khafi Khan does not mention that he himself compiled the information about Aurangzeb even when he started working for the Mughal Empire administration in late 1690s. Sharma states that he has stumbled into a manuscript in Rampur library that reads like Khafi Khan's book, but is written by Abu'l Fazl Ma'muri. In significant parts, states Sharma, Khafi Khan took Abu'l Fazl Ma'muri work, stripped the text therein of the actual author's name, embellished it with his own opinions and narrative and published it as his own work.

According to the historian Munis Faruqui, Khafi Khan is a much used source on Deccan during the Aurangzeb and post-Aurangzeb period. It is an important but questionable source, because Khafi Khan presents a one-sided Islamist view, one that portrayed "Hyderabad as an Islamic bastion in the Deccan". The historical evidence is significantly more ambiguous than Khafi Khan's narrative. In post-Golconda Sultanate era, the Nizam was an astute political agent who tailored his letters to the sentiments of the audience. In his copious correspondence with the Mughal emperor, states Faruqui, the Nizam calls his forces as "holy warriors" and an "army of Islam" (lashkar-i-Islam or fauj-i-Islam) pursuing a "jihad" against the "kafirs" and "upholding the prestige of Islam". In contrast, in his letters to Hindu rulers such as Sawai Jai Singh II, seeking their continued support, the Nizam was diplomatically mellow and used language such as "our fight against .. misguided people" and the "partisans of Shahu" (the Marathas). Focusing on either collection of letters, states Faruqui, leads to "diametrically opposing judgments" about the Nizam and the state of Deccan politics during the ongoing Mughal-Maratha war. Khafi Khan is regarded as an important source of Mughal-era events and motives, such as the resignation of the Nizam from all the imperial commissions of the Mughal empire years after the death of Aurangzeb. According to Faruqui, Khafi Khan explains that the Nizam resigned because Bahadur Shah was favoring and promoting the "low borns" in his court over those with a lineage in Mughal noble families. This can be corroborated in the writings of other Muslim historians.

=== Translations ===
Khafi Khan's Muntakhab-al Lubab has been translated into English by Syed Moinul Haq, as Khafi Khan's History of Alamgir (Karachi). It is available as a separate book, as well as articles in different volumes of the Journal of the Pakistan Historical Society.

Elliot and Dowson also published an English translation of Muntakhab-al Lubab in the 19th century. Jadunath Sarkar has compared Khafi Khan and Saqi Mustaid Khan versions in his five volume-publications on Mughal period and History of Aurangzib.

=== Usage ===
Khafi Khan's text has been one of the favorite sources of historical information about Aurangzeb. Sarkar's translation has been used by scholars such as M. Athar Ali. Audrey Truschke, in her book Aurangzeb: The Life and Legacy of India's Most Controversial King, uses the Haq's translation as one of her sources. She calls Khafi Khan a "laudatory" historian for Aurangzeb. According to Truschke, Khafi Khan is one of the "so-called key historians" of Aurangzeb along with Saqi Mustaid Khan, who wrote Maasir-i Alamgiri. However, the reliability of both is questionable because Khafi Khan's 1731 version and Saqi Khan's 1711 version were written years after Aurangzeb's death in 1707. This gap of years means that they "relied extensively on memory and hearsay to reconstruct events" and this must have "allowed unintentional errors to creep into their chronicles", says Truschke.
