= Muntakhab-al Lubab =

Persian language book about the history of India

Muntakhab-al Lubab (Arabic for "selected [records] of the wise and pure") is a Persian language book about the history of India. Completed around 1732, it was written by Khafi Khan in the Mughal Empire of present-day India. The title of the book is also transliterated as Muntakhab ul-Lubab or Muntakhab-i-Lubab; it is also known as Tarikh-i Khafi Khan.

== Contents ==
The book is divided into three volumes:

1. Volume 1 deals covers local dynasties up to the Lodis
2. Volume 2 covers the Timurid dynasty and the Mughals up to Emperor Akbar, including the Sur interregnum
3. Volume 3 covers the Mughal period after the death of Akbar (1605)

The book covers events up to the beginning of the 14th year of Muhammad Shah's reign, that is, 1732. It covers the history of the Mughal dynasty in detail, including their ancestor Timur and his successors. It is an important source of information for the reigns of Shah Jahan and Aurangzeb. Besides the Mughals, the book is an important source of Sikh history during the period of Guru Gobind Singh and Banda Singh Bahadur.

According to Khafi Khan, his account of the period after 1669 was based on his personal observations and the verbal testimony of other witnesses.

== Editions and translations ==
During 1768–1774, Maulvi Kahtr-ud-din edited and printed the book in Calcutta. English translations of its extracts appeared in H. M. Elliot and John Dowson's The History of India, as Told by Its Own Historians (Volume VII), and William Erskine's History of India under Babar and Humayun.
