= Madhe Ghat =

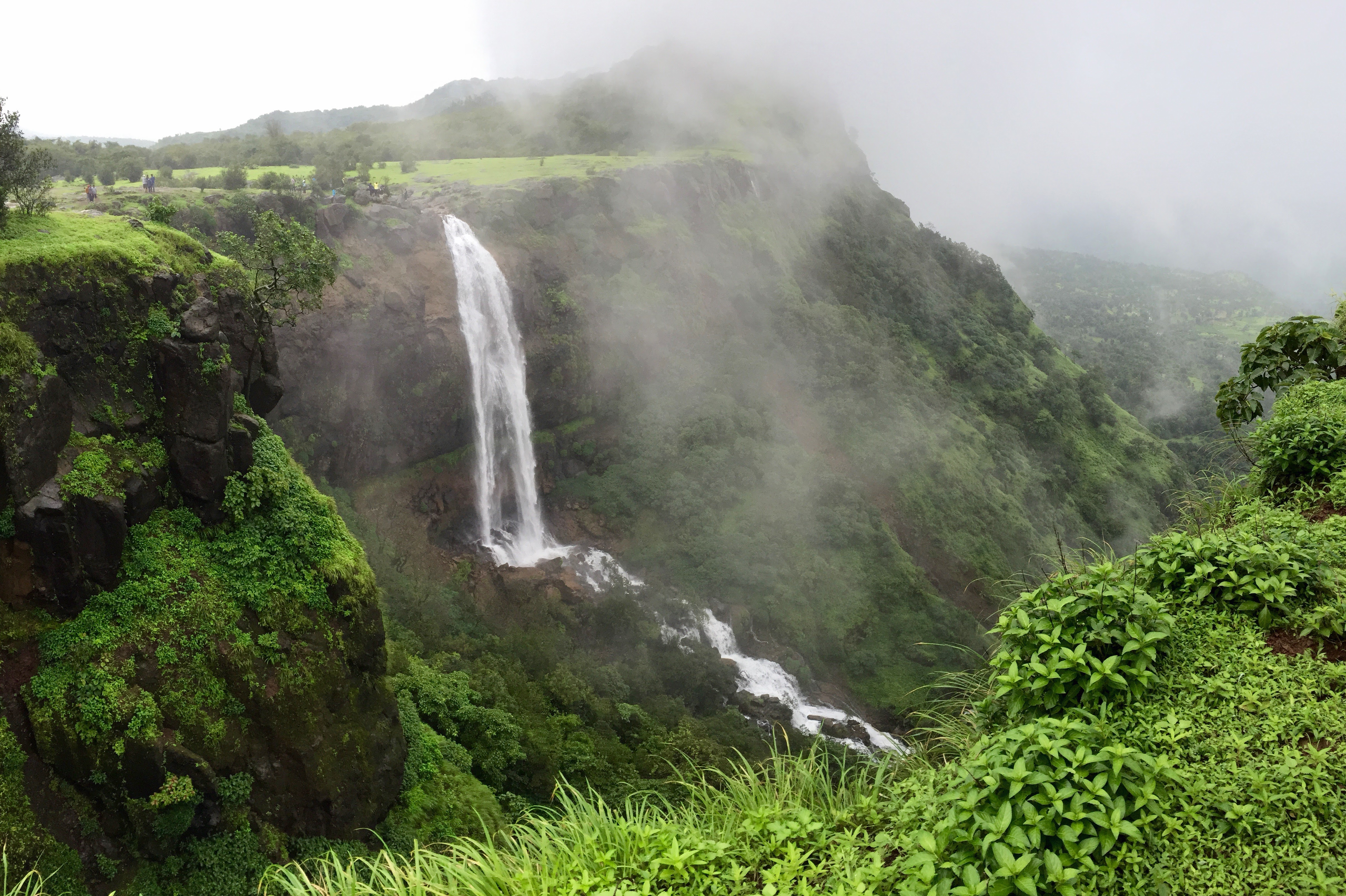
- Madhe Ghat waterfall

- Location within India
- Coordinates: 18.1975°N 73.5744°E

Madhe Ghat is a waterfall located in Maharashtra, a state of India, around 62 km southwest of Pune, bordering Raigad district and in the vicinity of Torna Fort, Rajgad, Raigad Fort and the backwaters of the Bhatghar Dam. The name of the waterfall is Laxmi Waterfall. It is about 850 meters above sea level and situated in dense forests behind Torna Fort. The view from Madhe Ghat offers a panorama of a vast area, comprising, for example, Raigad Fort, Lingana, Varandha Ghat and Shivthar Ghal.

Historically, the spot is known for its connection to the warrior Tanaji Malusare. When Malusare died in the battle of Sinhagad, his body was to be taken for last rites in his native village Umrathe near Poladpur. Tanaji Malusare's funeral procession was taken to his native place starting from Madhe Ghat.

From Madhe Ghat there is a walkable way to Birwadi. At the bottom of Madhe Ghat, there is also a small temple for the god Shiva with a small water tank called "Dev Take". Also you can see another waterfall and a historical path on the middle of the right adjacent hill called "Boratyachi Nal", which was used by Chatrapati Shivaji's army to go towards Kokan. The entire area has become a famous spot for trekking in recent years.
