= Ambenali Ghat =

Mountain road in Maharashtra, India

Ambenali ghat
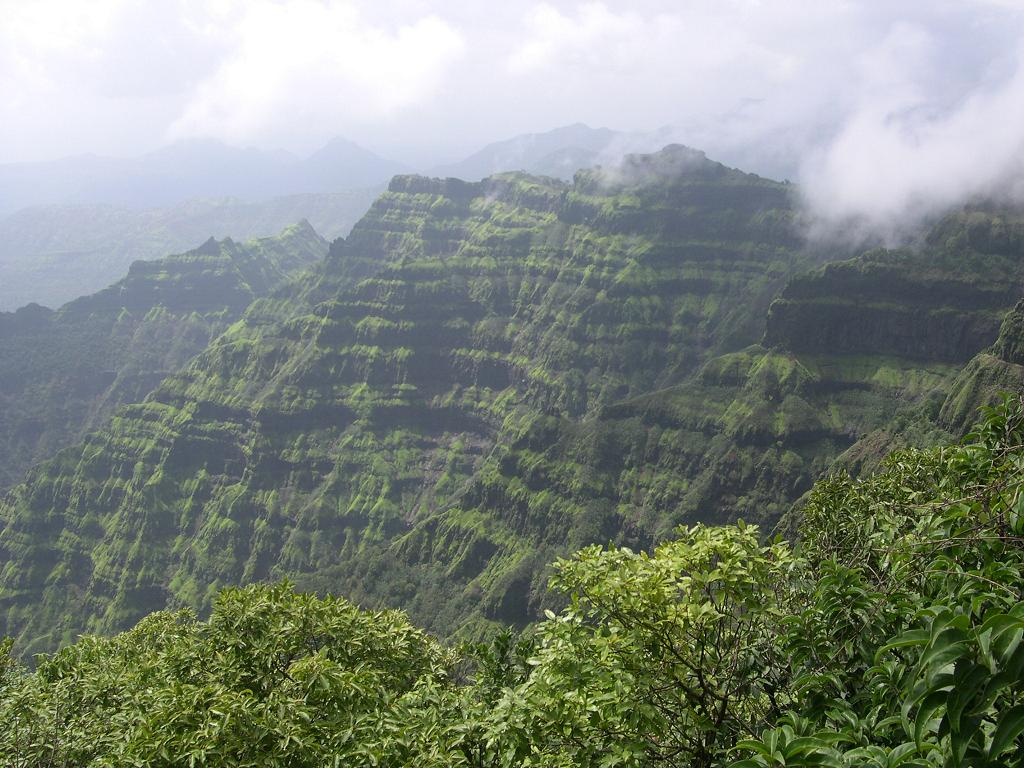
- The Pass
- Interactive map of Ambenali ghat
- Elevation: 625 m (2,051 ft)

Third Approach
- Location: Satara-Raigad Districts, Maharashtra, India
- Range: Western Ghats
- Coordinates: 17.93°N 73.55°E

Ambenali Ghat is the longest ghat (mountain road) in Maharashtra, India, cutting across the Northern Western Ghats or the Sahyadri mountain range. It connects the coastal Raigad District Konkan region of Maharashtra with the Satara District Desh region on the Deccan plateau. It is one of few link roads between the Konkan and Ghatmaatha in Maharashtra. The road, state highway 72, is at an average elevation of 625 m (2,051 ft).

The mountain road is about 40 km (25 mi) long. Its characteristic feature is that it takes many turns without gaining/losing much height. It links the cities of Poladpur (Raigad district) and Mahabaleshwar (Satara district). It ends in Poladpur. The road ascends/descends around 1,300 m (4,300 ft) from Mahabaleshwar to Poladpur. This ghat travels through the Javali forest area. Many animals like leopards are seen here.

This 40 km long ghat is known for its deadly road, where many accidents take place. It is very scenic and its picturesque landscape makes it an ideal location for tourists who flock around the ghat in crowds but it is known for being closed during the monsoon season sometimes due to "safety issues". Ambenali Ghat has been classified as a landslide-prone site.

== History ==
In the olden times the ghat road was protected by the Pratapgad, and Kamalgad forts. The famous battle between Afzal Khan (general) and Shivaji Maharaj was fought at the base of the pratapgad fort. This ghat is dangerous and one must drive cautiously as many accidents have happened in this ghat. It starts near the Bombay point, descends 500 metres and goes near Pratapgad fort. It descends 500 meters from Pratapgad and enters the Konkan region near Payatewadi, meeting Mumbai-Goa road.
