= National Highway 166F (India) =

National Highway in India

National Highway 166F
- Map of National Highway 166F in red

Route information
- Auxiliary route of NH 66
- Length: 25.6 km (15.9 mi)

Major junctions
- South end: Mahad
- North end: Raigad Fort

Location
- Country: India
- States: Maharashtra

Highway system
- Roads in India; Expressways; National; State; Asian
← NH 66	→ NH 166F

National Highway 166F, commonly referred to as NH 166F is a national highway in India. It is a secondary route of National Highway 66. NH-166F runs in the state of Maharashtra in India.

== Route ==
NH166F connects Mahad and Raigad Fort in the state of Maharashtra.

== Junctions ==
NH 66 Terminal near Mahad.

== See also ==
- List of national highways in India
- List of national highways in India by state
