= Surendranath Tipnis =

Social activist and president of Mahad municipality

Surendranath Tipnis was the president of the Mahad Municipality in the early 1900s and a social activist. He was born in a CKP family. Along with other progressive social activists of the time such as A.V. Chitre and the Chitpawan Brahmin G. N. Sahasrabudhe, he was instrumental in helping Babasaheb Ambedkar during the Mahad Satyagraha. He declared Mahad's public spaces open to untouchables and invited Ambedkar to hold a meeting at Mahad in 1927. Later, he went on to become an MLA in Ambedkar's Independent Labour Party. He was awarded the titles Dalitmitra (friend of the Dalits) and 'Nanasaheb'.
