= Mahad Satyagraha =

Satyagraha of water led by B R Ambedkar

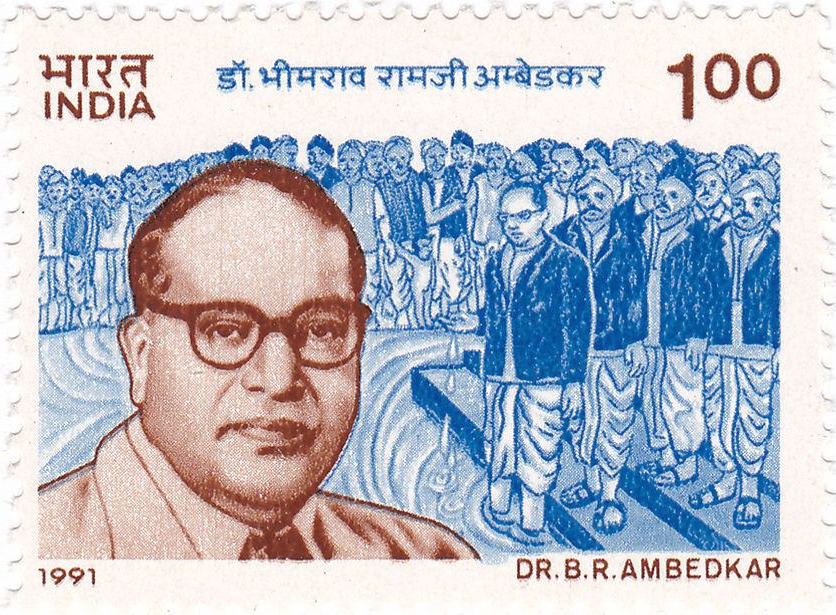
B. R. Ambedkar and Mahad Satyagraha on an Indian 1991 stamp

Mahad Satyagraha or Chavdar Tale Satyagraha was a satyagraha led by B. R. Ambedkar on 20 March 1927 to allow untouchables to use water in a public tank in Mahad (currently in Raigad district), Maharashtra, India. The day (20 March) is observed as Social Empowerment day in India.

== Background ==
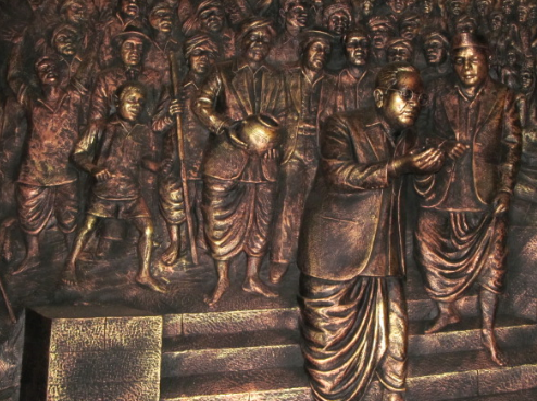
Bronze sculpture depicting Mahad movement by B. R. Ambedkar

By the Indian caste system, untouchables (Dalits) were segregated from the other Hindu castes. They were banned from using water bodies and roads which were used by other Hindu castes. In August 1923, Bombay Legislative Council passed a resolution that people from the depressed classes should be allowed to use places which were built and maintained by the government. In January 1924, Mahad which was part of the Bombay Province passed the resolution in its municipal council to enforce the act. But it was failed to implement because of the protest from the savarna Hindus.

== Satyagraha ==
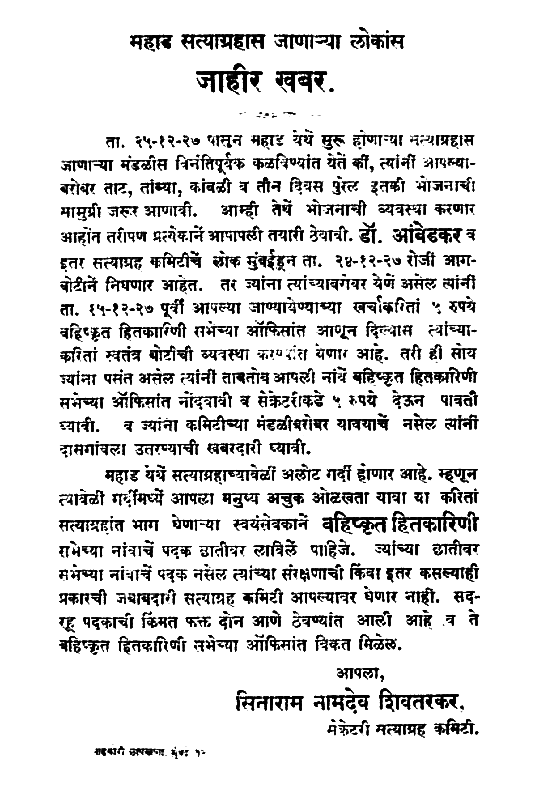
Flyer published before Mahad Satyagraha in 1927

In 1927, Ambedkar decided to launch a satyagraha (nonviolent resistance) to assert their rights to use water in the public places.

Mahad, a town in Konkan, was selected for the event because it had a nucleus of support from few 'upper caste hindus'. These included A.V.Chitre, an activist from the Marathi Chandraseniya Kayastha Prabhu (CKP) community; G.N.Sahasrabudhe, a Chitpawan Brahmin of the Social Service League and Surendranath Tipnis, a CKP who was president of the Mahad municipality.

Surendranath Tipnis, the president of the Mahad municipality declared its public spaces open to untouchables and invited Ambedkar to hold a meeting at Mahad in 1927. After the meeting, they proceeded to the 'Chowdar tank'. Ambedkar drank water from the tank and thousands of untouchables followed him.

Ambedkar also made a statement addressing the Dalit women during the Satyagraha. He asked them to abandon all old customs that provided recognizable markers of untouchability and asked them to wear saris like high caste women. Before that time, the Dalit women were not allowed to drape saris completely. Immediately after Ambedkar's speech at Mahad, the dalit women readily decided to drape their saris like the higher caste women. Upper caste women namely Lakshmibai Tipnis and Indirabia Chitre helped the Dalit women dress like 'upper caste women' by covering the legs of the dalit women down to their ankles.

A riot broke out following a rumour that Ambedkar and his followers were planning to enter a Hindu temple in the town. And few upper caste Hindu argued that untouchables polluted the tank by taking water from it. To purify the tank cow-urine and cow-dung were used. 108 pots containing a mixture of these products were emptied into the tank while Brahmins recited mantras. The tank was then declared fit for upper caste hindu consumption.

Ambedkar decided to hold the second conference in Mahad on 26–27 December 1927. But caste Hindus filed a case against him that tank as a private property. He was not able to continue his satyagraha as the case was sub judice.

On 25 December (Manusmriti Dahan Din), Shastrabuddhe under the guidance of Ambedkar, burnt Manusmriti, a Hindu law book, as a protest. In December 1937, the Bombay High Court ruled that untouchables have the right to use water from the tank.

On 19 March 1940, Dr. Ambedkar arranged a rally and public conference in Mahad to recollect 14th Mahad Satyagraha Day as "Empowerment Day". On this day, Adv. Vishnu Narhari Khodke, as President of Mahad Municipal Corporation, arranged a function and honoured Dr. Ambedkar with a Letter of Honour (मानपत्र) for his "Chavdar tale Satyagraha" and "Manusmruti Dahan" and other movements in Mahad.

== See also ==
- Manusmriti Dahan Din
- Poona Pact
- Dalit Buddhist movement
- Selma to Montgomery marches
