= Gandharpale Caves =

Buddhist caves in Maharashtra, India

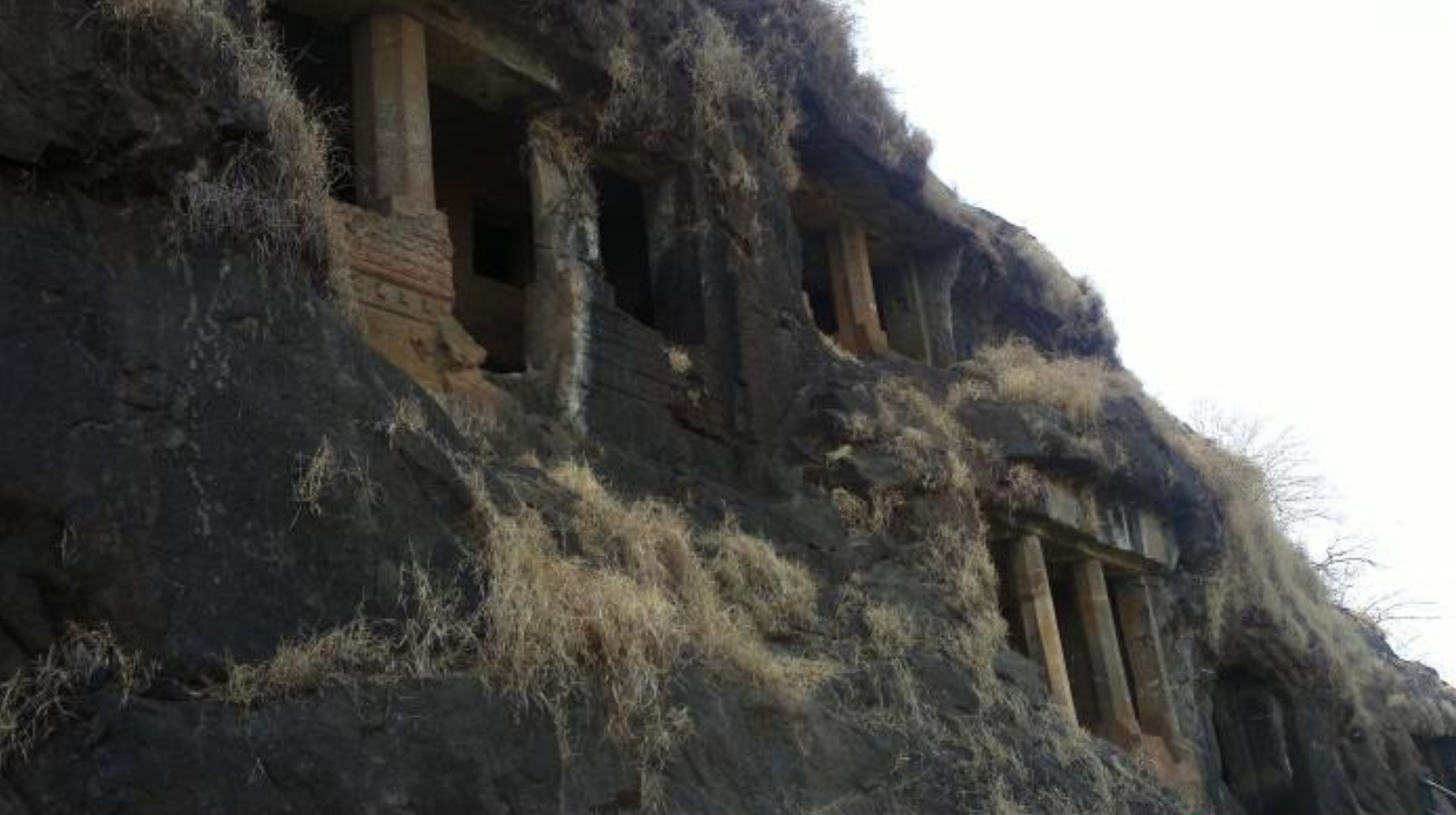
- Gandharpale Caves

- Location within India
- 18.086802°N 73.404100°E

Site notes
- Governing body: Archeological Survey of India

Gandharpale Caves, also called Mahad caves is group of 30 Buddhist caves, 105 km south of Mumbai on Mumbai-Goa Highway near Mahad. The caves are located near the NH-17 (New NH-66) and well connected by road.

Important cave include:

- Cave 1: has Verandah in front 53 feet long and 8 feet wide. Shrine has sculpture images of Buddha, with wheel and deer beneath
- Cave 8: it has high dogoba
- Cave 15: has dogoba
- Cave 21: seated Buddha with attendants

The inscription describes donations by bankers, and the gift of a farm to the Sangha.

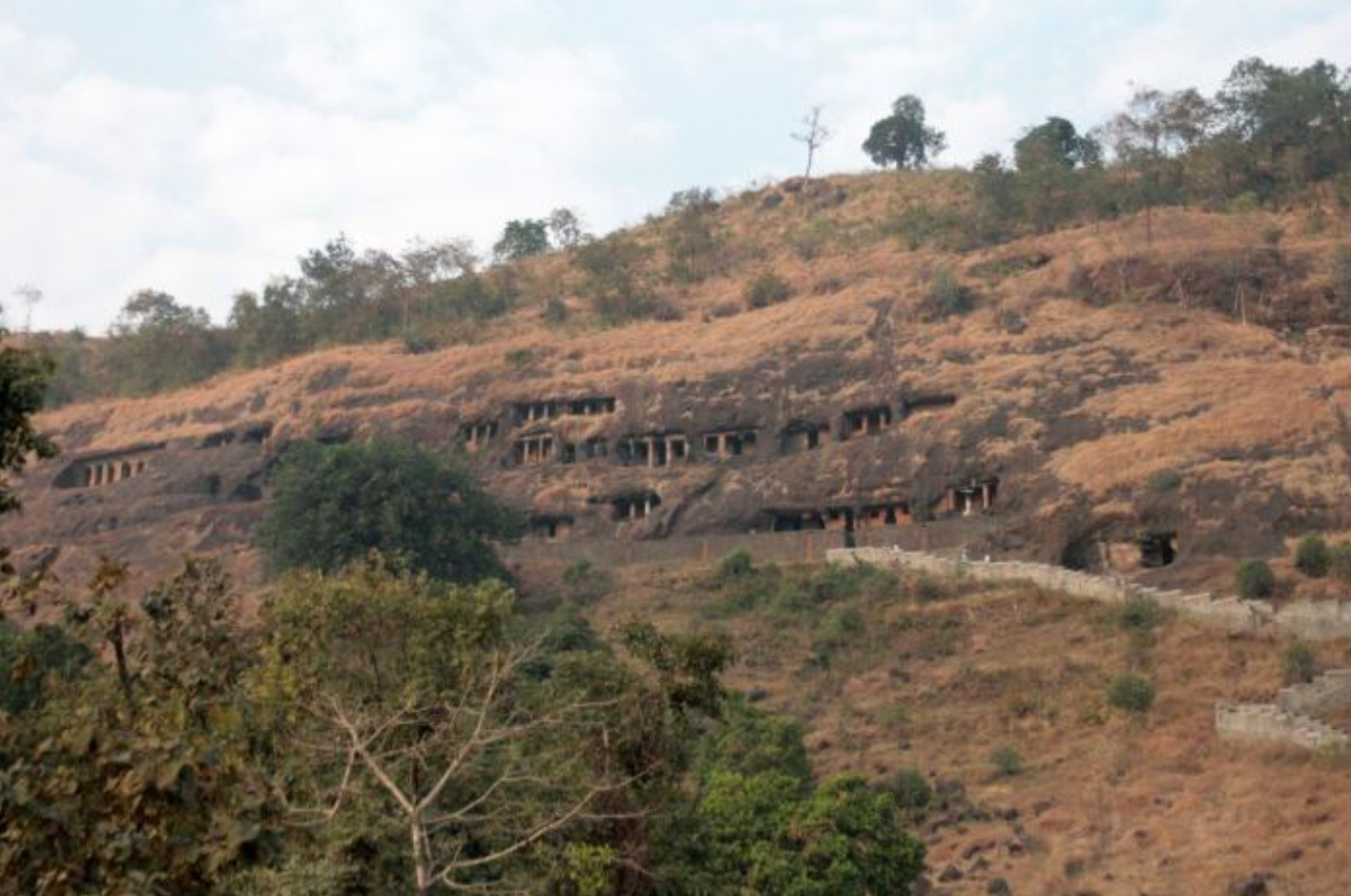
General view

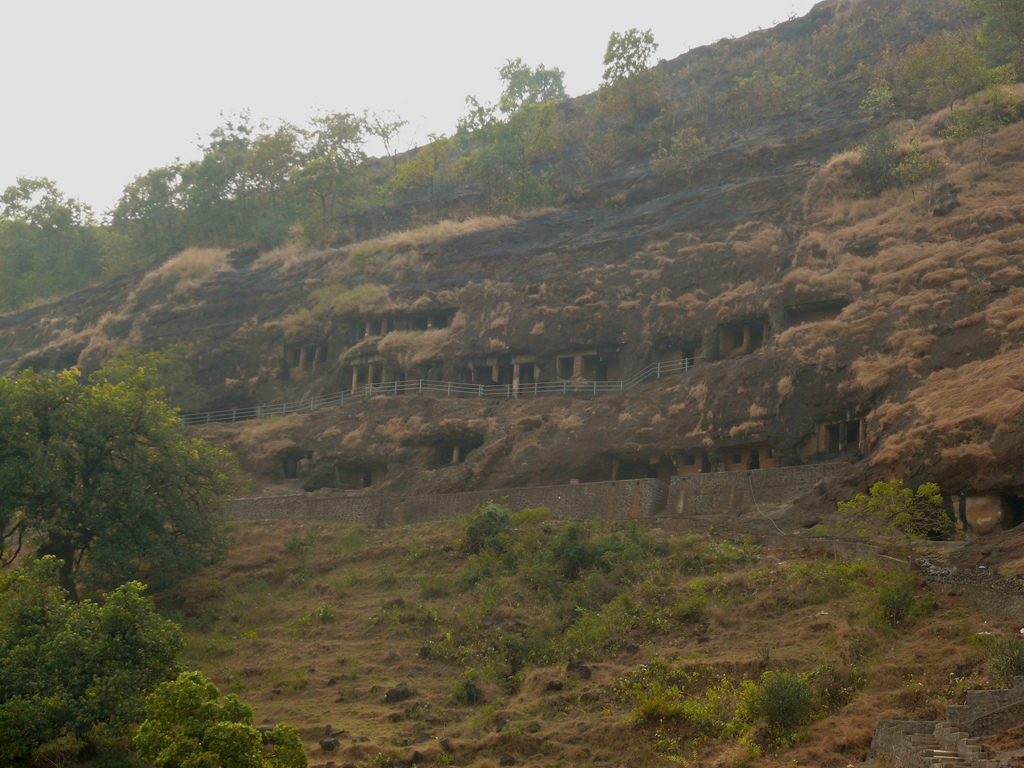
The Caves

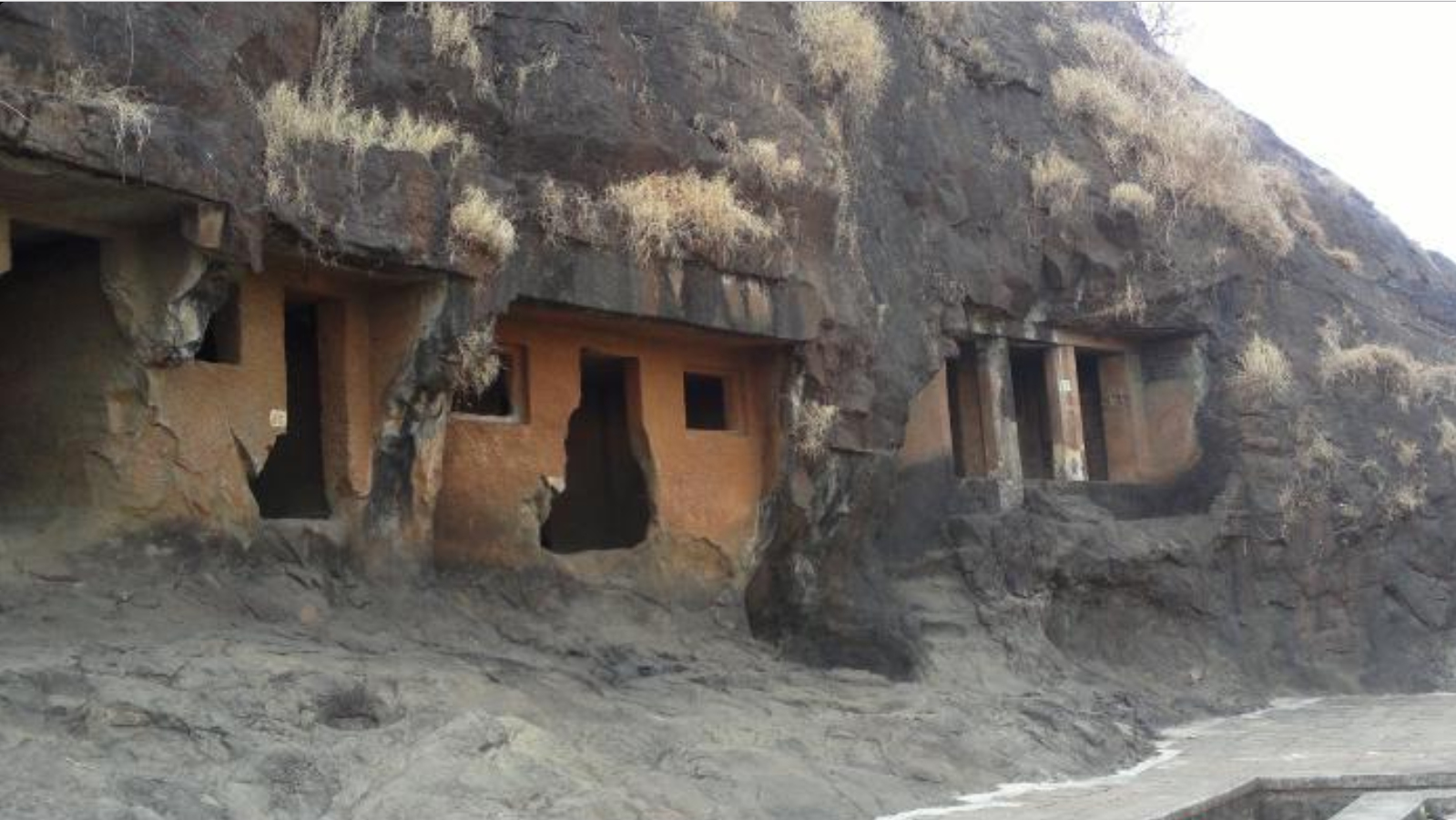
Cave entrance

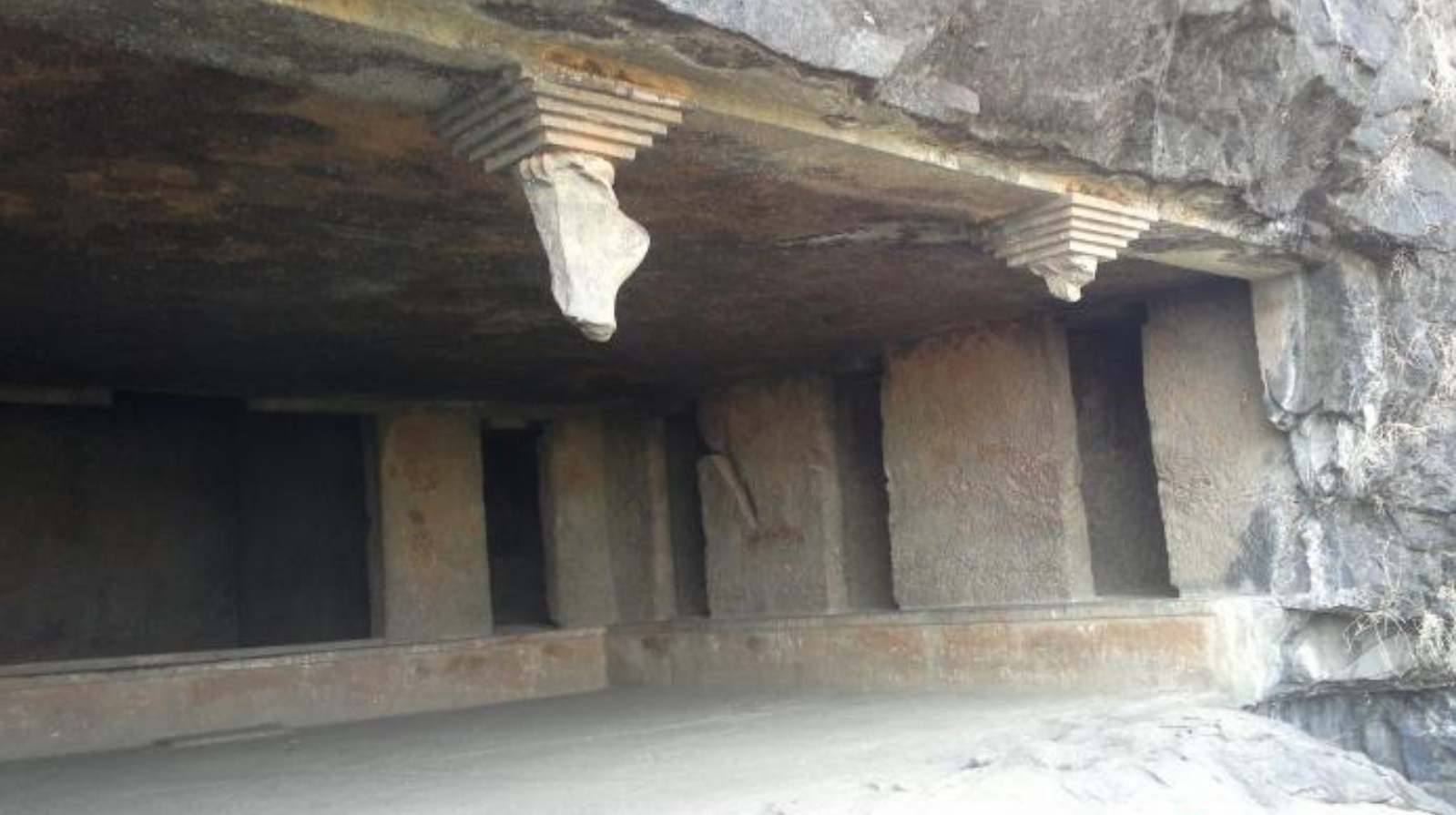
Interior

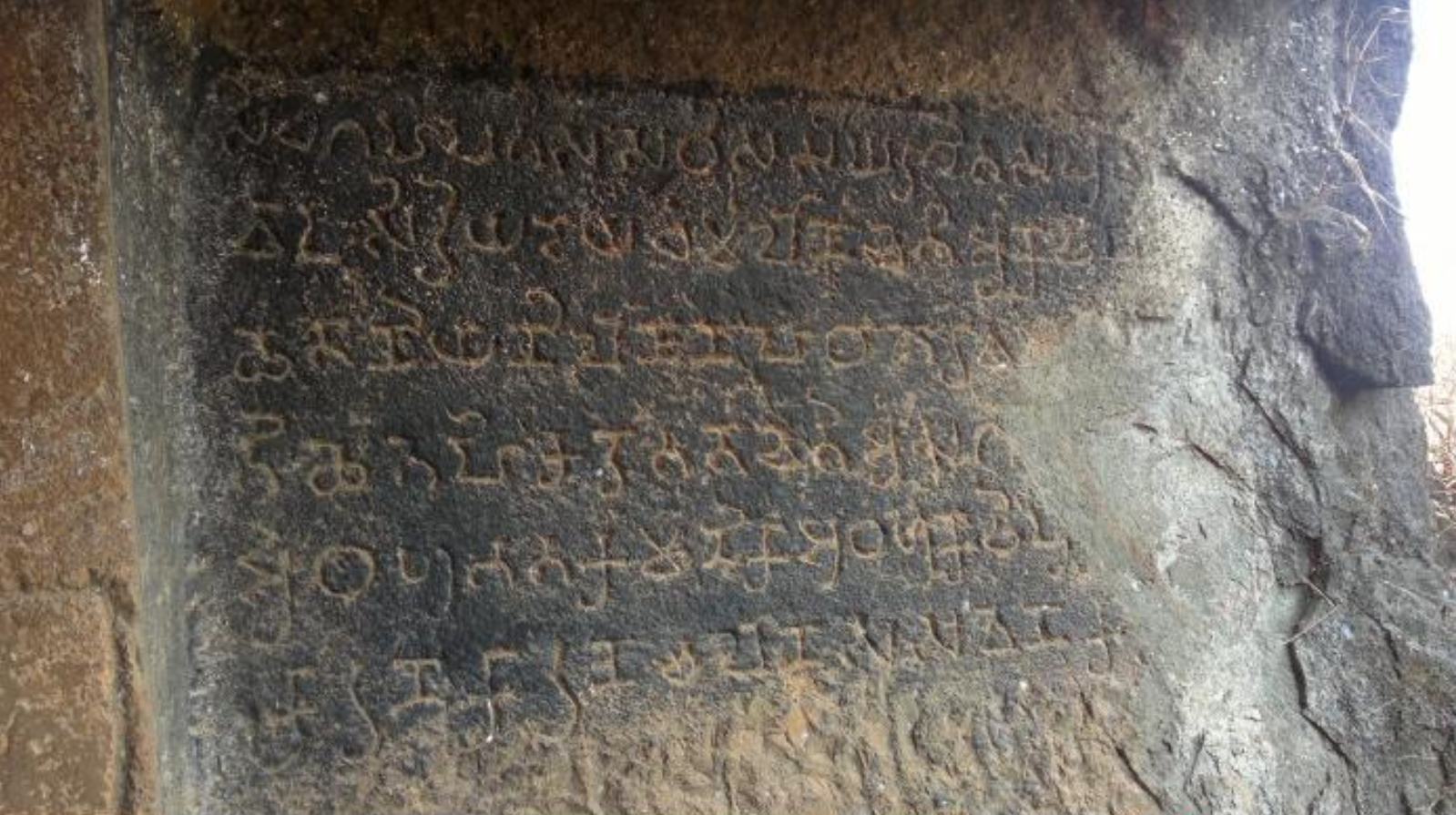
Dedicatory inscription
