= Gangadhar Nilkanth Sahasrabuddhe =

Gangadhar Nilkanth Sahasrabuddhe was an Indian social activist from Maharashtra. He was born in a Marathi Chitpawan Brahmin family and belonged to the Social Service League. Along with other activists - Surendranath Tipnis, chairman of the Mahad Municipality and A.V. Chitre, he was instrumental in helping Babasaheb Ambedkar during the Mahad Satyagraha. During the satyagraha he burnt the book Manusmriti. Later, he went on to become the editor of Ambedkar's weekly 'Janata'.
