= Vishnupalita Kambhoja =

Vishnupalita Kambhoja (Kumara Kanbhoja Vhenupalita in Mhar (Mahad) inscriptions) finds reference in the Buddhist inscriptions (today known as Gandharpale caves situated near confluence of Gandhari & savitri rivers) found at Mhar or Mahad in Kolaba district of Maharashtra, in Bombay Presidency. Kanbhoja of the inscriptions is same as the Kambhoja or Kamboja of ancient Sanskrit and Pali texts and of king Asoka’s Rock Edicts. The prince is believed to have ruled in Kolaba (near Bombay), probably around the 2nd century CE.

== Inscriptions ==
Inscriptions and charters belonging to the Bhoja rulers, dating to the 5th century, executed by Nidhivara and written by Buddhadasa of the Kamboja have been found in Bandora, Goa.

Luders's inscriptions No 176 and 472 refer to the gift of a monk Kaboja Kamboja) from Nandi-Nagara made at Sanchi Buddghist Stupa. According to IHQ: "The monk was a Kamboja of Nandi-Nagara which might have been a place in the neighborhood of Sanchi". But no evidence of any ancient place called Nandi-Nagara near Sanchi (in Malawa) is attested. Probably the Nandi Nagara of the Sanchi Inscriptions refers to modern Nandode (Rajpipli) in Gujarat which in earlier was known as Nandan Nagar or Nandi-puri.

== See also ==
- Raigad district
