= Shivthar Ghal =

Shivthar Ghal Sundarmath
- cave
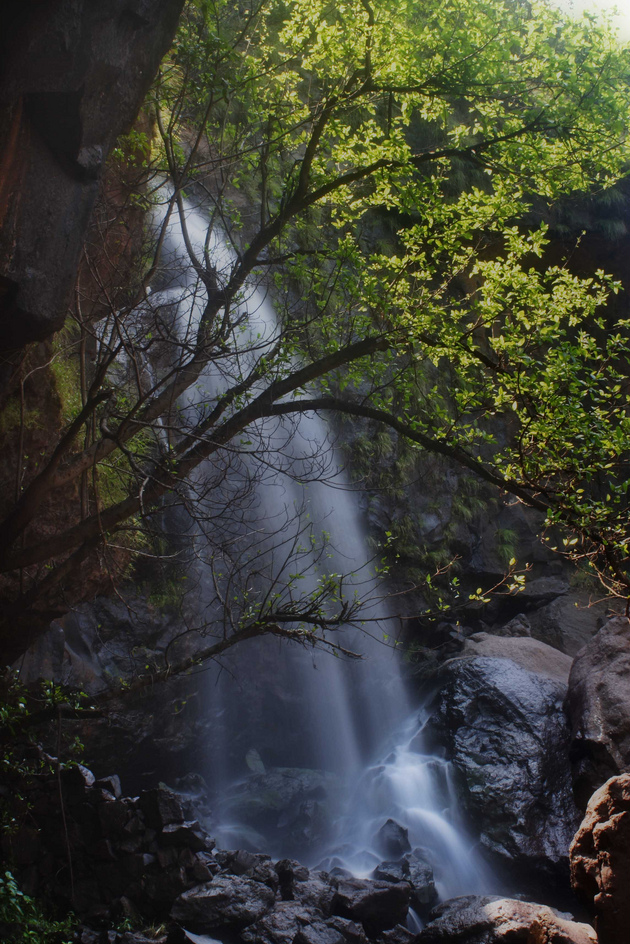
- Waterfall at Shivtar Ghal

- Location in Maharashtra, India
- Coordinates: 18.15°N 73.62°E
- Country: India
- State: Maharashtra
- District: Raigad

Languages
  - Official: Marathi
- Time zone: UTC+5:30 (IST)
- Vehicle registration: MH-06

Shivthar Ghal, also known as Sundarmath, (Sundarmath means Beautiful Monastery), is a cave, about 34 km from Mahad, near Barasgaon, Maharashtra, India. Shivthar Ghal is located in Varandha Ghat in the Sahyadris on the Bhor-Mahad road. In monsoons, a waterfall falls in front of the cave.

Samarth Ramdas dictated Dasbodh to Kalyan Swami. Samarth Ramdas lived here for about 22 years. It is believed that this is where the first meeting between Maratha king Shivaji and Samarth Ramdas took place.
