= Torna Fort =

Mountain in India

Torna
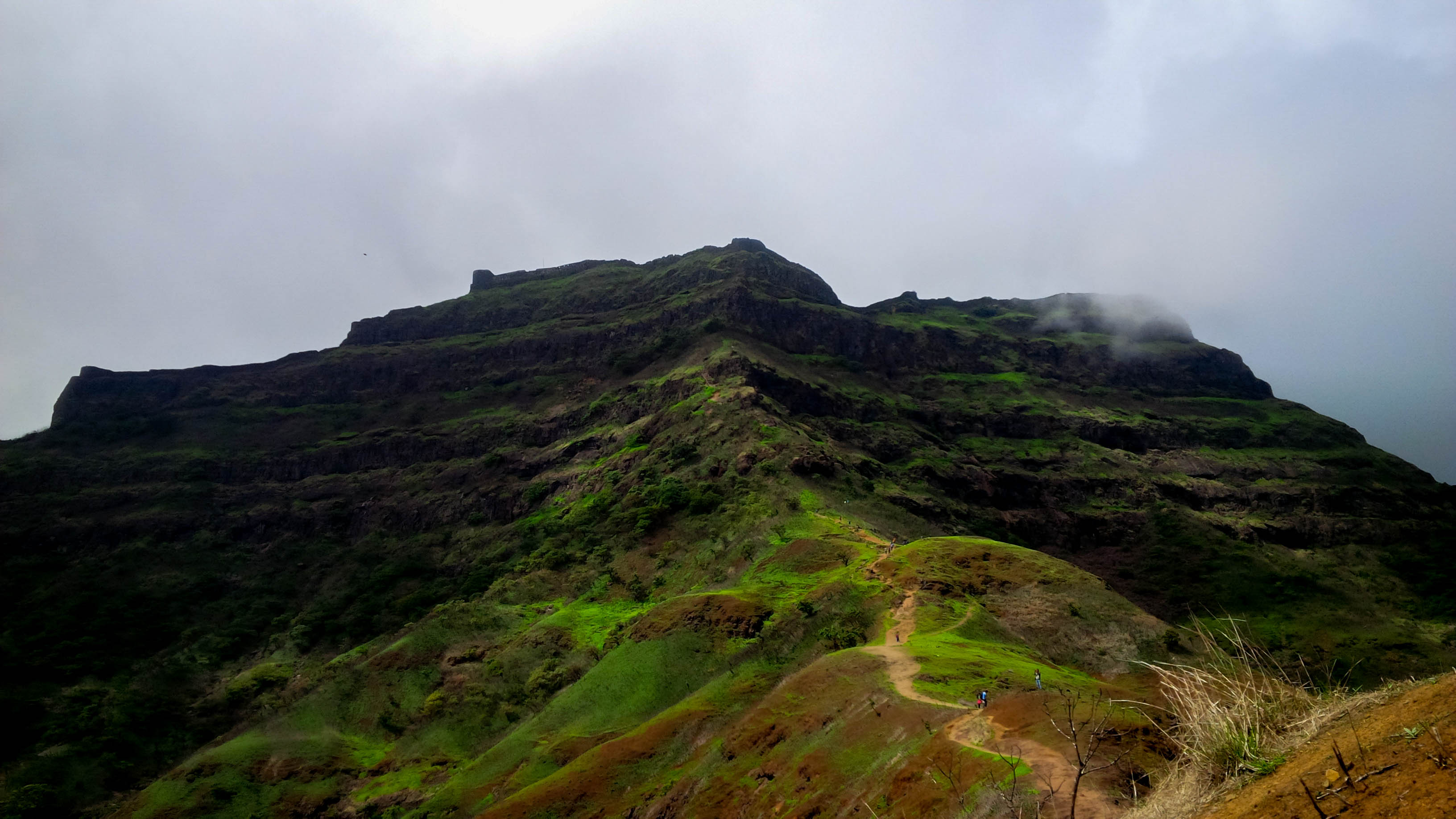
- Torna Fort

Highest point
- Elevation: 1,403 m (4,603 ft)
- Coordinates: 18°16′33.86″N 73°37′21.78″E

Naming
- English translation: तोरणा गड
- Language of name: Marathi

Geography
- Location within Maharashtra Location within India
- Location: Pune district, Maharashtra, India
- Parent range: Sahyadri Range

Torna Fort, also known as Prachandagad, is a large fort located in Pune district, in the Indian state of Maharashtra. It is historically significant because it was the first fort captured by Chhatrapati Shivaji Maharaj in 1646, at the age of 16. The hill has an elevation of 1,403 metres (4,603 ft) above sea level, making it the highest hill-fort in the district. The name derives from Prachanda (Marathi for huge or massive) and gad (Marathi for fort).

== History ==
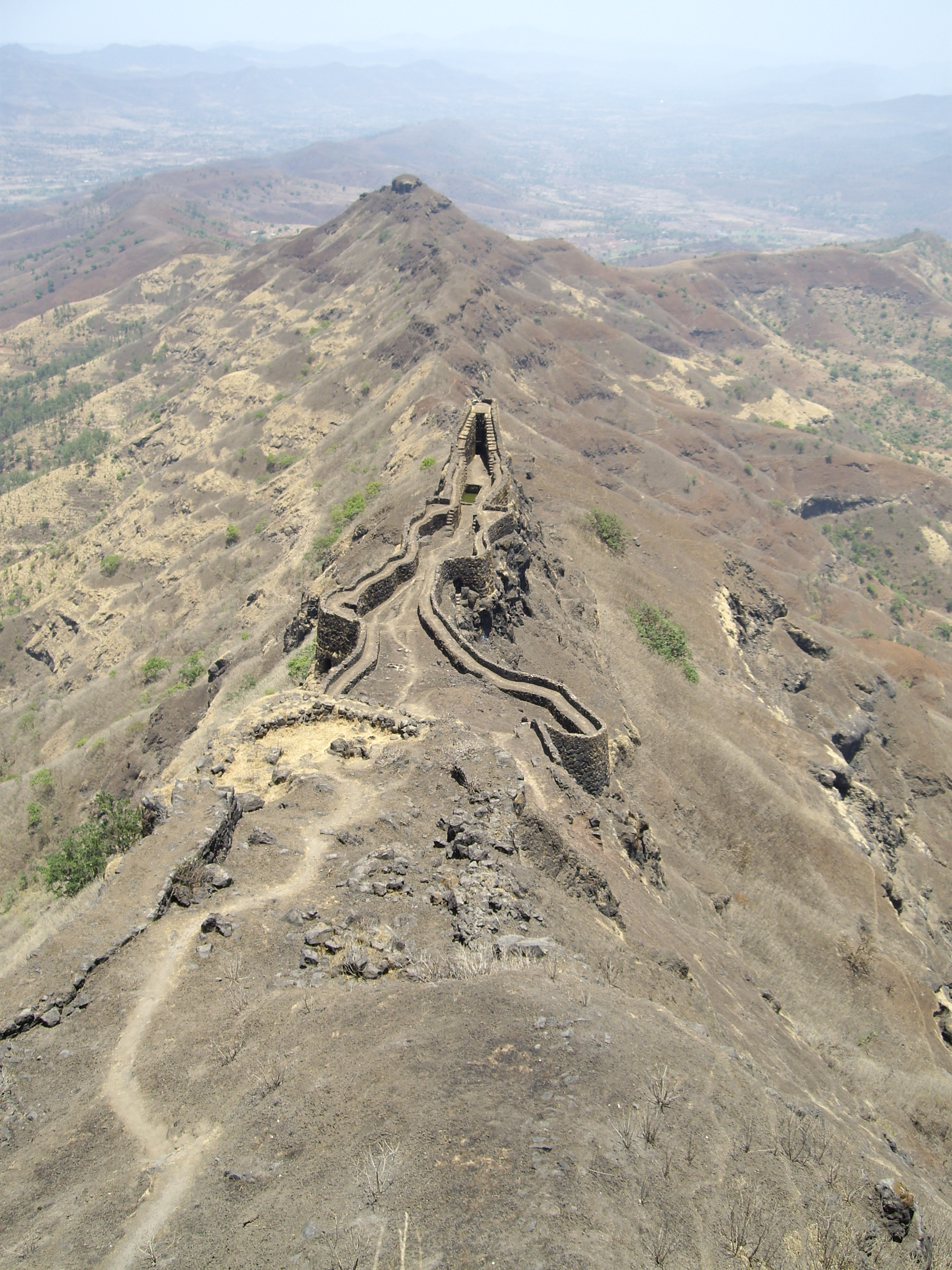
Torna fort zunjar machi fortification

This fort is believed to have been constructed by the Shiva Panth in the 13th century. A Menghai Devi temple, also referred to as the Tornaji temple, is situated near the entrance of the fort.

In 1646, Shivaji captured this fort at the age of sixteen, thus making it one of the first forts that would become one of the forts of the Maratha Empire. Shivaji renamed the fort ' 'Prachandagad' ' as Torna, and constructed several monuments and towers within it. After capturing the fort, whilst repairing the fort and digging ruins, he discovered large quantities of gold buried in some unknown time. He used it to build Rajgarh fort among others.

In the 18th century, the Mughal Empire briefly gained control of this fort after the assassination of Shivaji's son Sambhaji. Aurangzeb, the Mughal emperor, renamed this fort Futulgaib in recognition of the difficult defense the Mughals had to overcome to capture this fort. It was restored to the Maratha confederacy by the Treaty of Purandar.

== Location ==
The fort is about 50 km via Pabe ghat southwest of Pune in the Western Ghats of the Sahyadri mountain ranges at the base village Velhe. One can go from Pune via Satara road and take right at Nasarapur village. This distance is near about 65 km. It is the highest fort in the Pune district.The distance from nasrapur is 30 km. The private vehicles are available from Pune and Nasrapur to velhe(village at the foothill).

== Tourism ==
The Torna Fort is a popular destination for trekkers specially after the south-west monsoon, from September to December. Staying at fort isn't allowed as per orders of District Collector, everyone is asked to leave the fort after 5:00pm. The Raigad, Lingana, Rajgad, Purandar fort, Sinhagad are some forts that can be seen from Torna. Other places that are visible from the fort include the Budhla Machi, Zungar Machi, Kothi Darwaja, Konkan Darwaja, Menghai goddess temple, Bini Darwaja, Sadar, and the Toranji goddess temple.

== Gallery ==
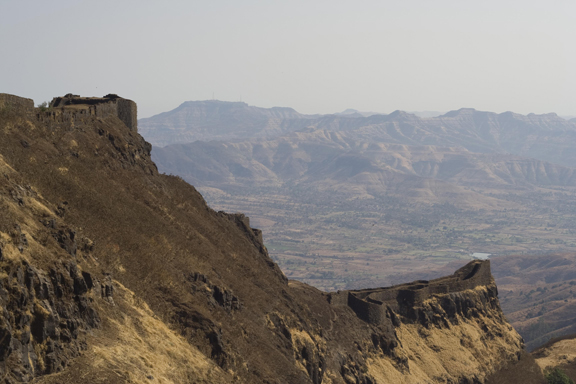
Torna fort with the zunjar machi fortification on right

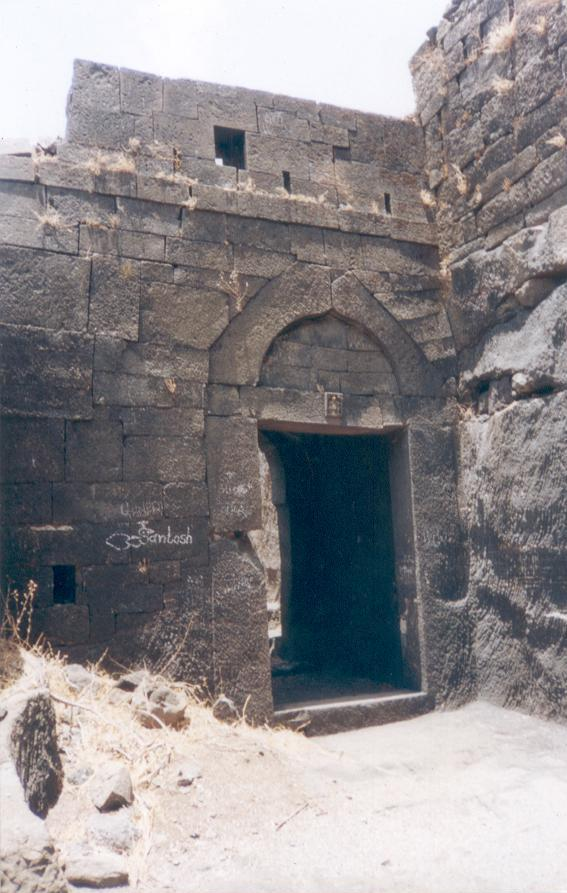

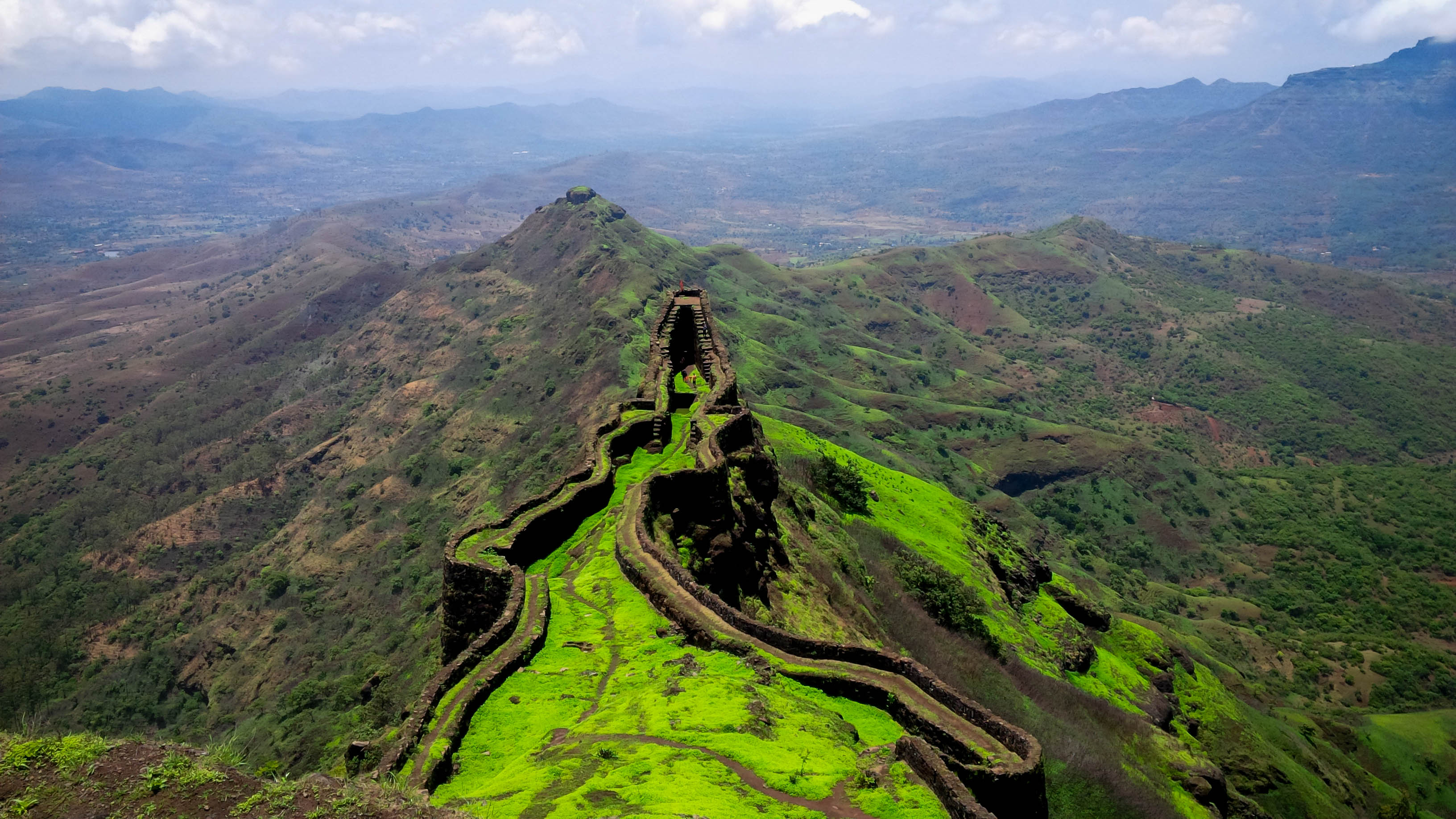
Zunzar Machi at Torna

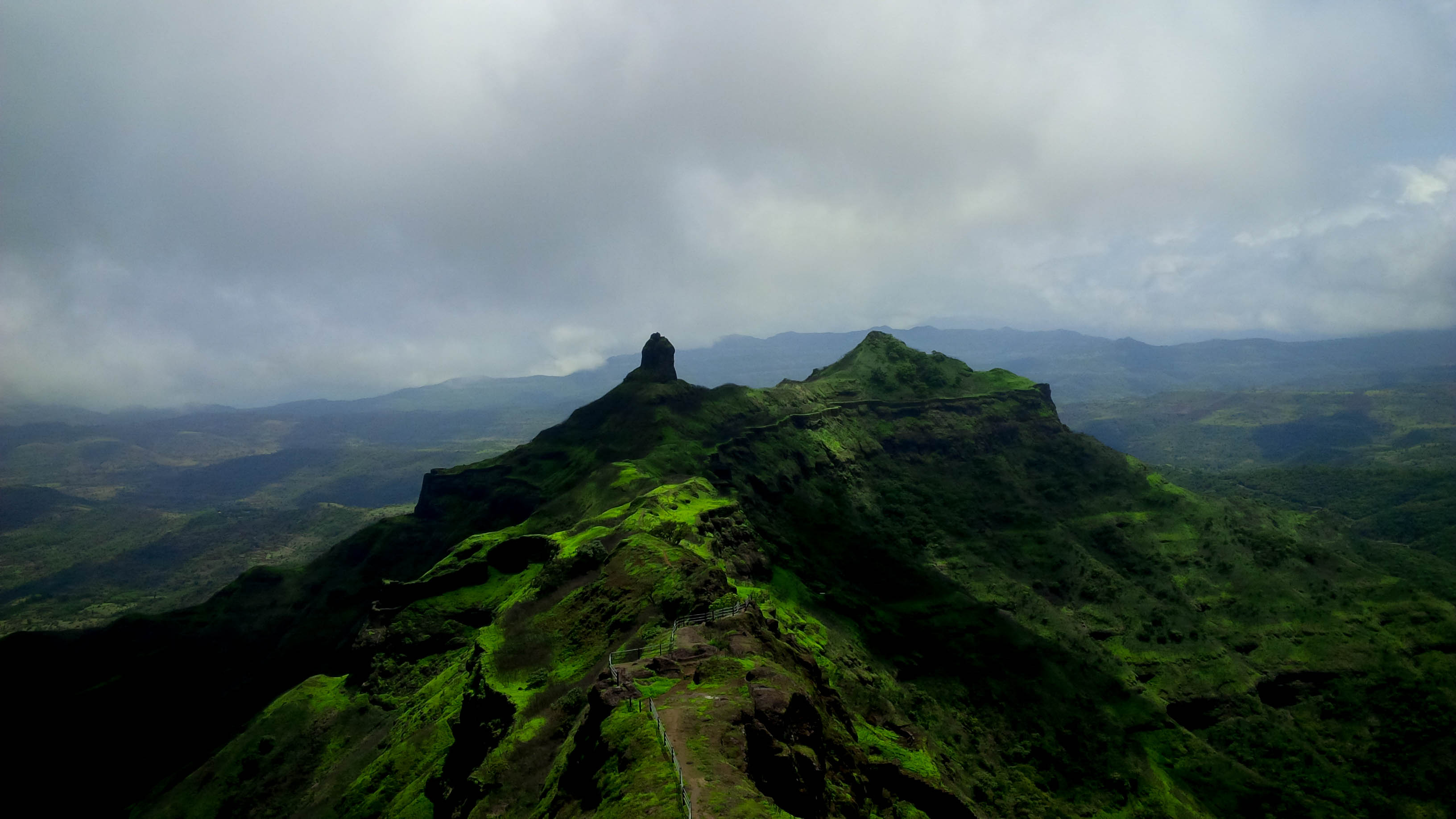
Budhla Machi at Torna

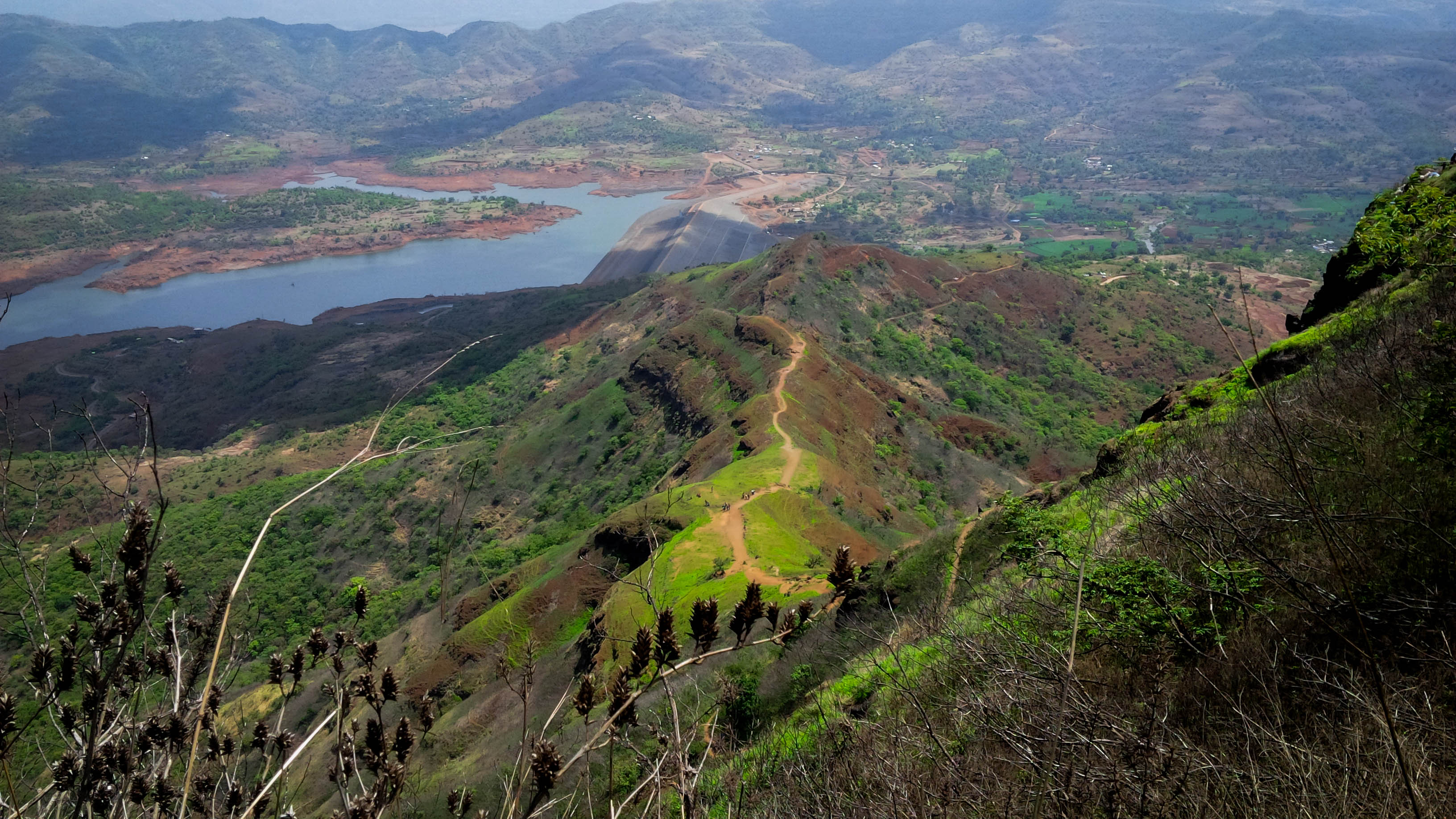
Way to Torna

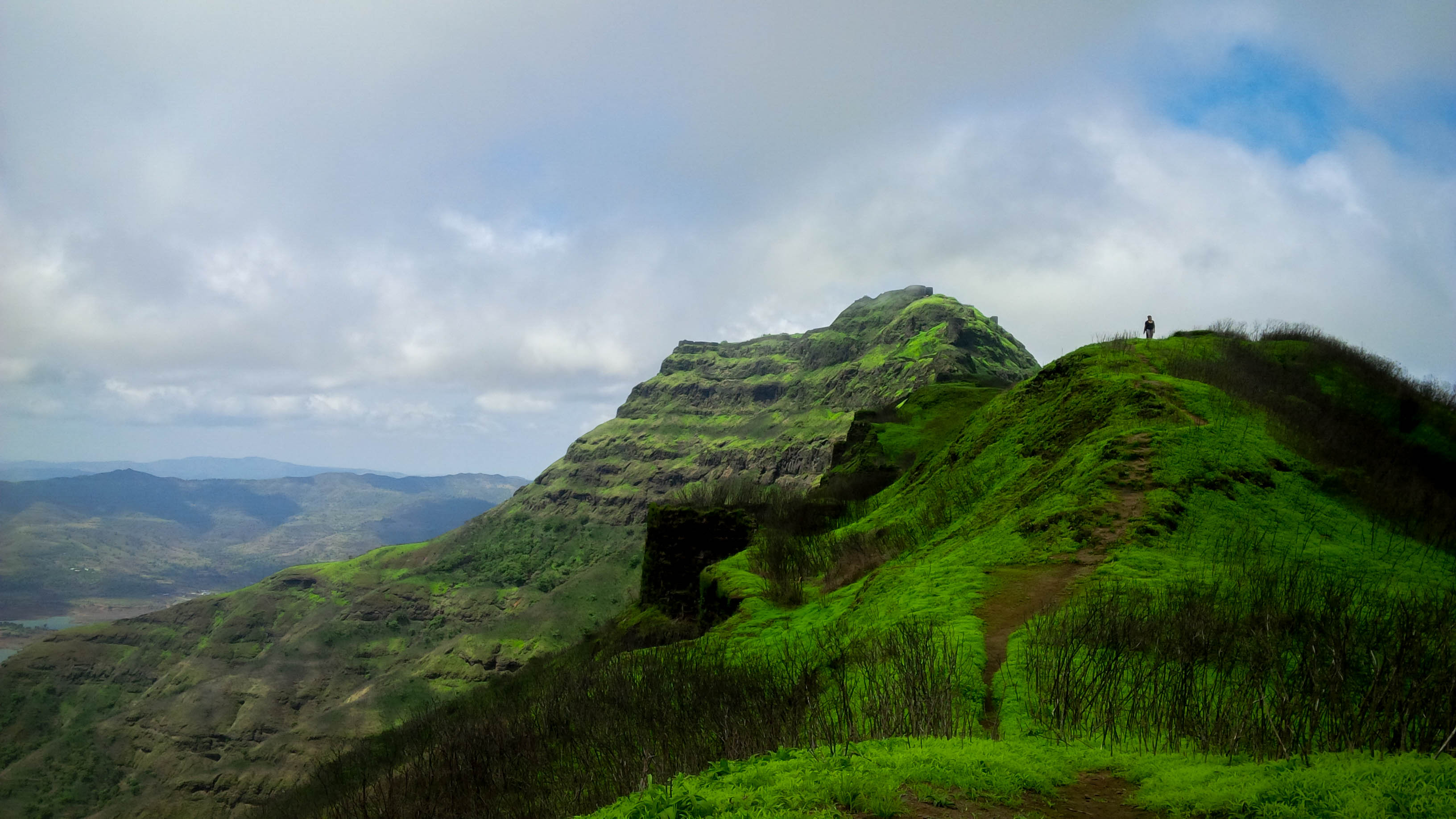
Torna from Budhla Machi

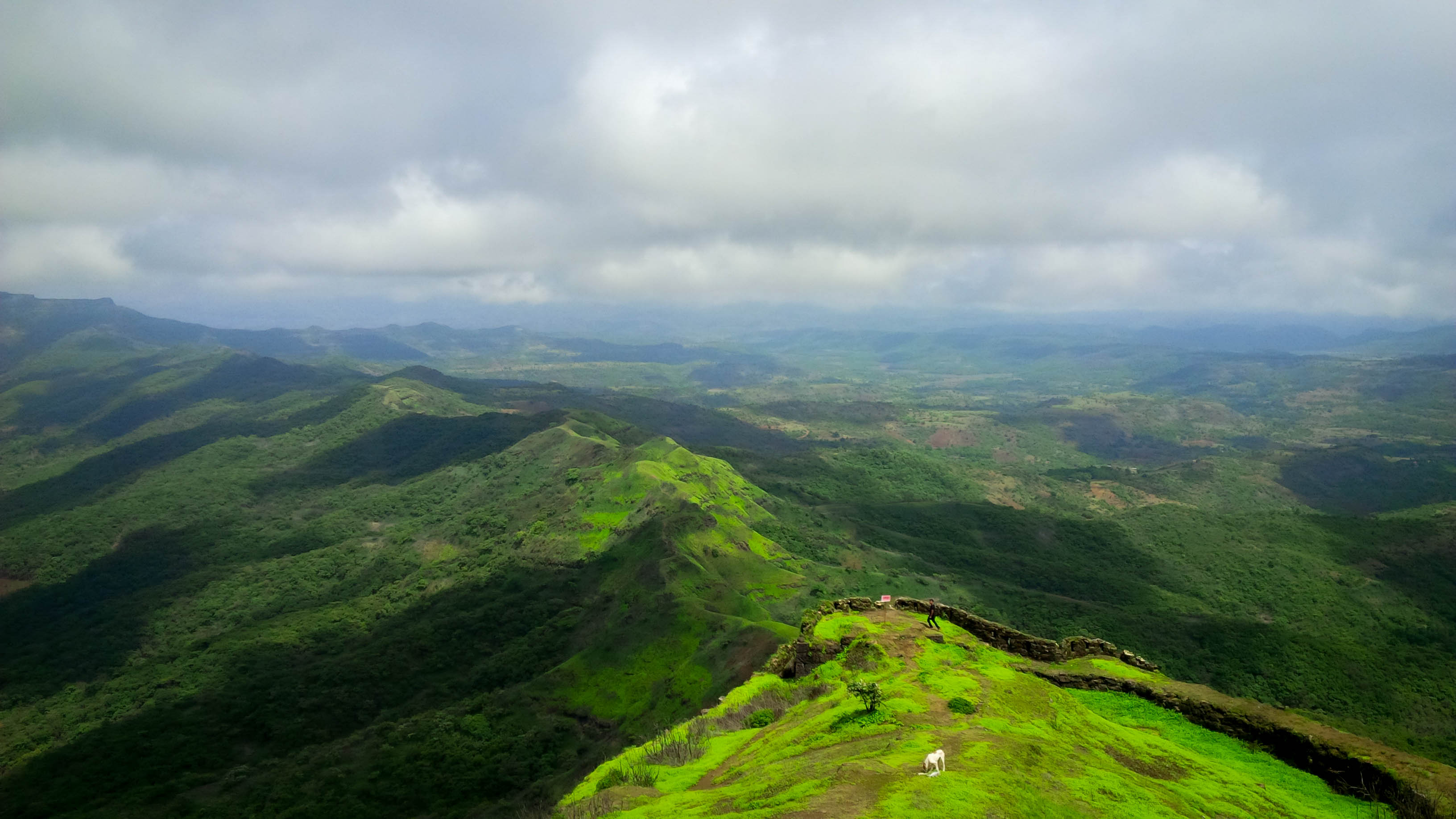
Way to Rajgad from Torna
