= Pratapgad =

Fort in Satara district, Maharashtra

- Satara district, Maharashtra, India
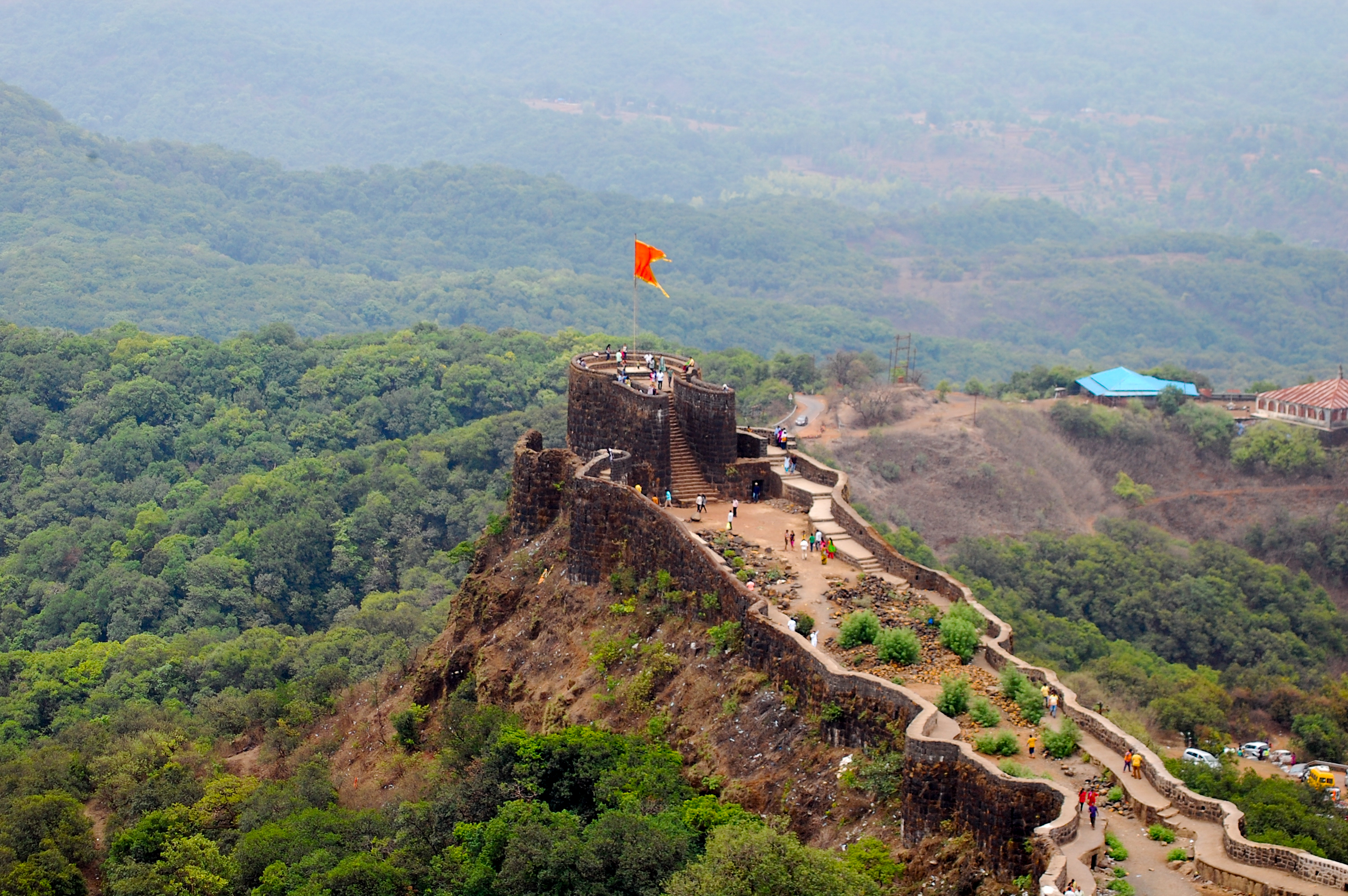
- View of one of the bastions of Pratapgad.

Site information
- Type: Hill Fort
- Controlled by: Maratha Empire (1656-1818); United Kingdom: East India Company (1818-1857); India (1857-1947); India (1947-present)
- Open to the public: Yes

Location
- Pratapgad fort in Maharashtra
- Location within Maharashtra
- Coordinates: 17°56′10″N 73°34′39″E
- Height: 3543 feet

Site history
- Built: 1656
- Built by: Shivaji I
- Architect: Hiroji Indulkar
- Battles/wars: Battle of Pratapgad (1659)
- Events: Chatrapati Shivaji killed Afzal Khan in battle of Pratapgad (1659)

UNESCO World Heritage Site
- Part of: Maratha Military Landscapes of India
- Criteria: Cultural: iv, vi
- Reference: 1739-007
- Inscription: 2025 (47th Session)

Pratapgad is a mountain fort located in Satara district, in the Western Indian state of Maharashtra. The fort is situated 24 kilometres from the Mahabaleshwar hill station. The fort is now a tourist destination.

The fort's historical significance is due to the Battle of Pratapgad, which took place here on 10 November 1659, between Chatrapati Shivaji Maharaj and Bijapur Sultanate general Afzal Khan. The fort was constructed on a hilltop, about 1,080 meters above sea level, with views of the surrounding landscapes. There are two main entrances to the fort, and the fort's gates are protected by high walls.It is divided into two parts – the lower fort and the upper fort. At present, the lower fort houses the main entrance, while the upper fort contains temples, a modern statue of Shivaji Maharaj, and several buildings. The fort has several watch towers and bastion for providing strategic military advantages during its time of use.

== The Big Story ==
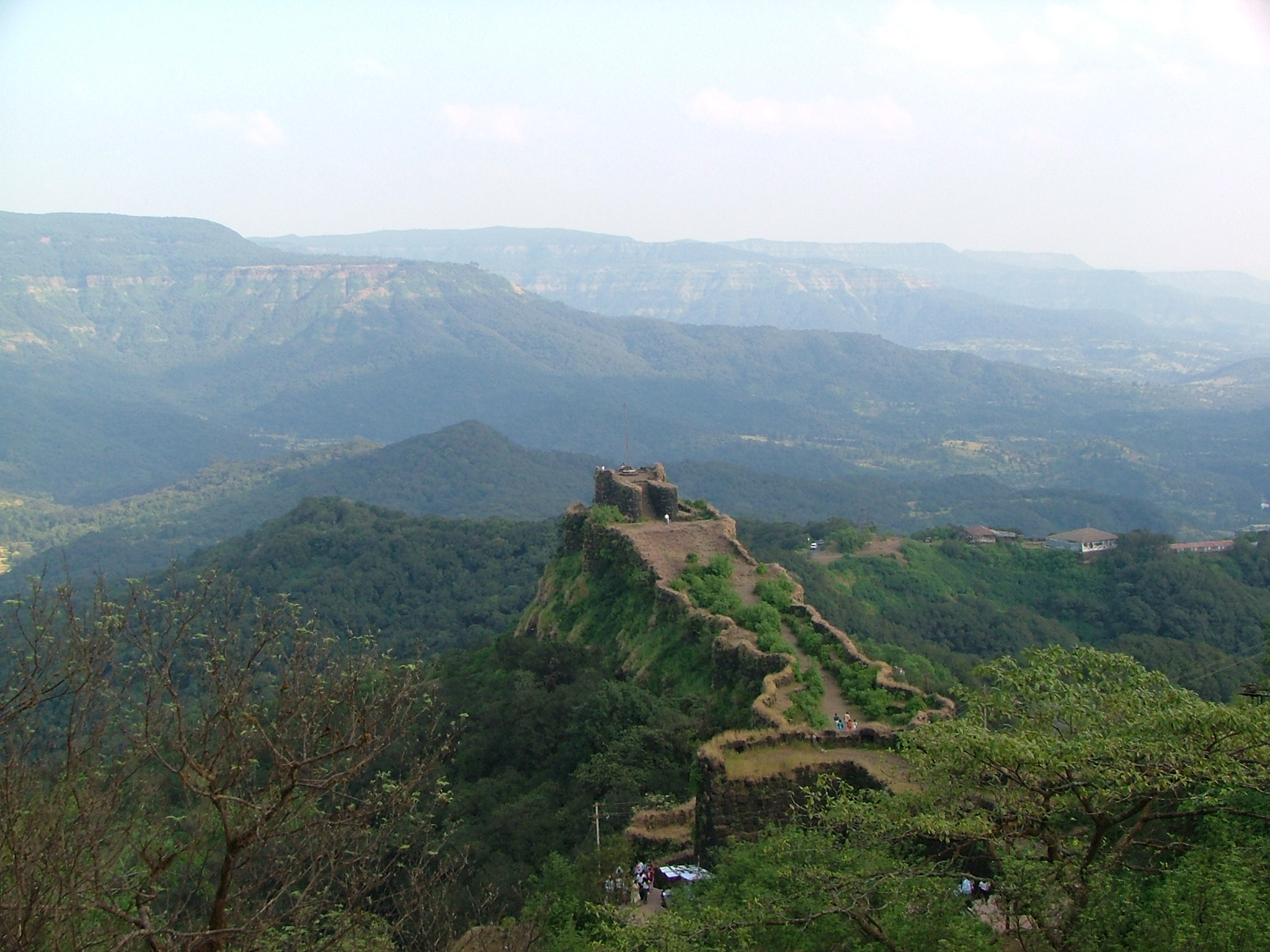
Before restoration works

The Maratha ruler Chhatrapati Shivaji Maharaj assigned Moropant Trimbak Pingle, his prime minister, to undertake the construction of this fort in order to defend the banks of the Nira and the Koyna rivers, and to defend the Par pass. It was completed in 1656.

The Battle of Pratapgad between Shivaji Maharaj and Afzal Khan, a general of Adil Shahi dynasty, was fought below the ramparts of this fort on 10 November 1659. This was the first major test of the fledgling kingdom's army, and set the stage of the establishment of the Maratha empire. Pratapgad Fort is a historical fort located in Satara district of Maharashtra, near Mahabaleshwar. It holds great significance in the history of the Maratha Empire and is known for its connection to Chhatrapati Shivaji Maharaj. The fort, built in 1656, stands as a symbol of valor and strategic brilliance.

Pratapgad continued to be involved in regional politics. Sakharam Bapu Bokil, a well-known minister of Pune, was confined by his rival Nana Phadnis in Pratapgad in 1778. He was later moved from fort to fort until he died at Raigad. In 1796, Nana Phadnis, while escaping from the intrigues of Daulatrao Shinde and his minister Baloba, assembled a strong garrison in Pratapgad before heading to Mahad. In 1818, as part of the Third Anglo-Maratha War, Pratapgad was surrendered to the East India company.

== Geography ==
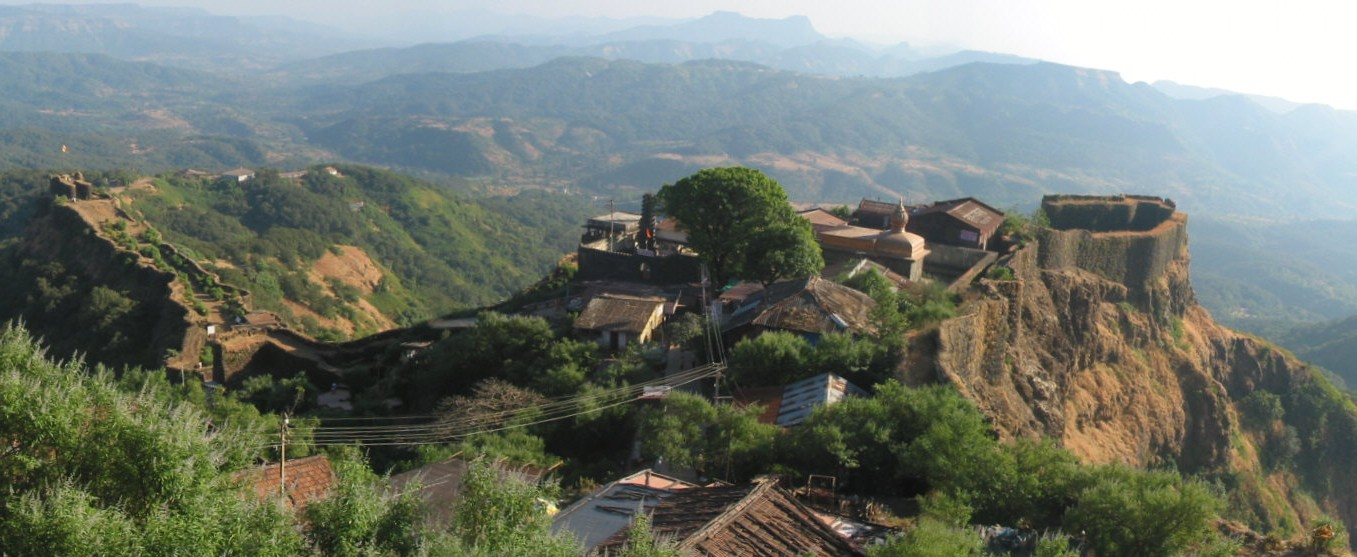
Overview of the fort.

Pratapgad fort is located at 15 km (9.3 mi) from Poladpur and 23 km (14 mi) west of Mahabaleshwar, a popular hill station of Maharashtra. The fort stands 1,080 metres (3,540 ft) above sea level and is built on a spur which overlooks the road between the villages of Par and Kinesvar.

The fort has a Tulja Bhawani temple from Chhatrapati Shivaji's time. It have murti of goddess Bhawani, which have eight hands (Marathi : Ashtbhuja). Weapons of soldiers are on display near this temple.

The fort forms part of the Maratha Military Landscapes of India, inscribed on the UNESCO World Heritage List in 2025; the inscribed Pratapgad property covers 79.3 hectares, within a buffer zone of 12,789.51 hectares.

== Tourism ==
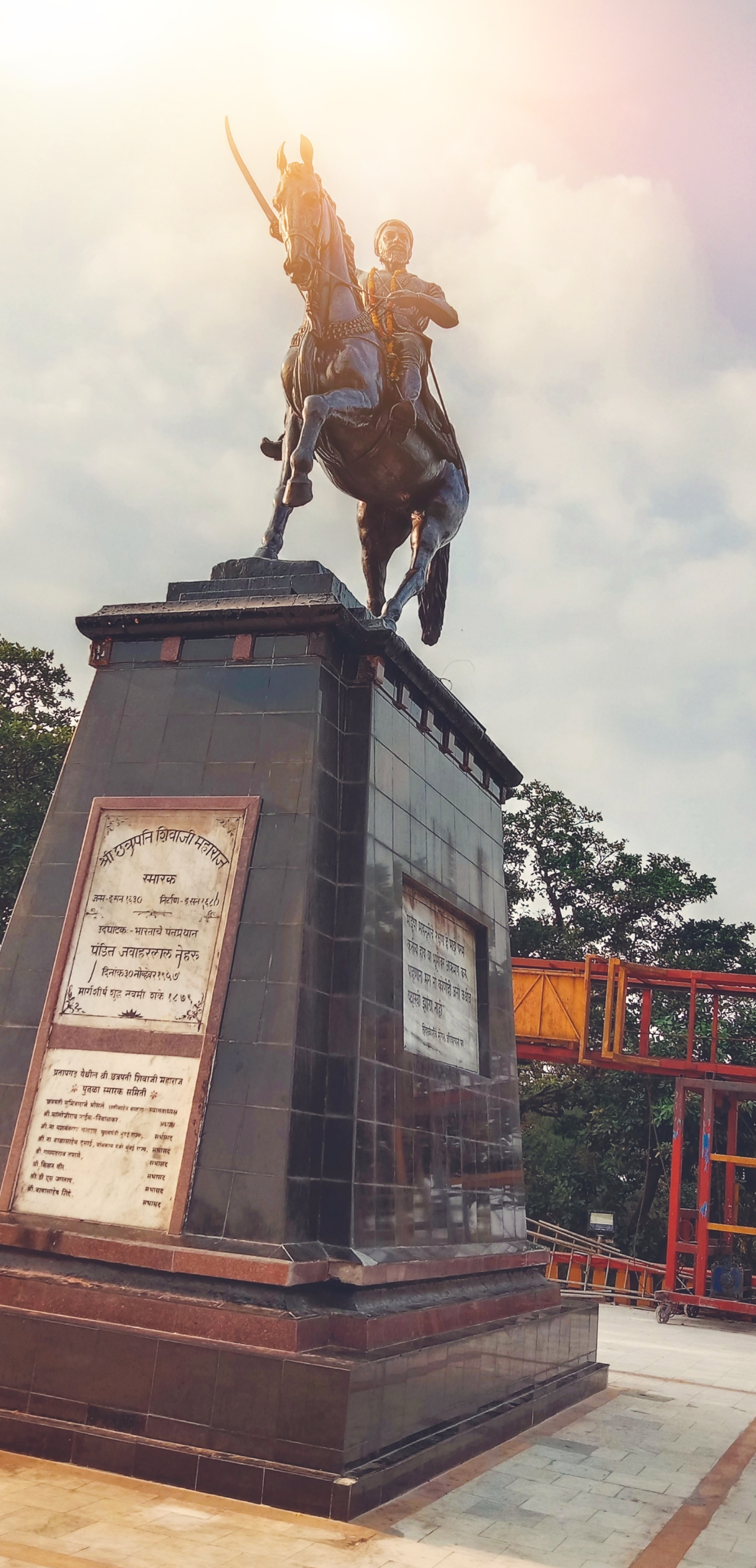
Statue of Shivaji at Pratapgad, inaugurated by Jawaharlal Nehru, the then prime minister of India in 1957

Maharashtra State Road Transport Corporation provides regular bus service. There are small shops, restaurants and a handicrafts store. Many schools also arrange educational trips to the fort. The fort is also on many trekking routes of the area.

The fort has a large bronze equestrian statue of Shivaji Maharaj. It was unveiled by Jawaharlal Nehru, then Prime Minister of India on 30 November 1957. The same year a road was constructed by the Public Works Department from Kumbhrosi village up to fort. A guest house and a small park was built inside the fort in 1960.

== See also ==
- List of forts in Maharashtra
