= Poladpur =

- Census town
- Location in Maharashtra, India
- Coordinates: 17.985591°N 73.466735°E
- Country: India
- State: Maharashtra
- District: Raigad

Government
  - Body: Poladpur Nagarpanchayat

Population (2011)
  - Total: 5,944

Languages
  - Official: Marathi
- Time zone: UTC+5:30 (IST)
- Postal code: 402303

Poladpur is a census town in Raigad district in the Indian state of Maharashtra.

== Etymology ==
Poladpur is a town named after Poladjung, one of the knights in the army of Mughal Emperor Aurangzeb. He was beaten and buried at Poladpur during the Nizam Shahi Sultanate Era by the elite warriors of the Chitre clan of CKPs. Hence, the name of the town. The grave of Poladjung can still be seen on the road beyond the town council joining the national highway on the banks of the Savitri River.

== Demographics ==
As of 2011 India census, Poladpur had a population of 5,944. Males constitute 50% of the population and females 50%. Poladpur has an average literacy rate of 74%, higher than the national average of 59.5%: male literacy is 79%, and female literacy is 69%. In Poladpur, 13% of the population is under 6 years of age.

== Location ==
Poladpur is located on the Mumbai-Goa Highway (NH 17) on the bank of the Savitri River. It is about 17 kilometers from Mahad and about 200 kilometers from Mumbai. The Ambenali ghat connects Poladpur to Mahabaleshwar. Many Maharashtra State Road Transport Corporation (also known as "ST") buses stop here before proceeding to Kashedi Ghat.

Geographically Poladpur is close to the border of Raigad district and is one of the fast growing cities in the district. It connects Ratnagiri district at its south and Satara district at its east.

Mahabaleshwar, one of the most popular tourist destinations in India is around 40 km from Poladpur city. From Poladpur one can also travel to Pratapgadh fort, a fort built by Shivaji Maharaj which is 15 km from the city.

== Historical importance ==
Kavindra Parmanand Govind Newaskar, a biographer of Shivaji, was from Poladpur. He took samadhi at Poladpur.

One of Shivaji's secretaries, Khando Ballal, also known as Khando Ballal Chitnis, was from Poladpur. His descendants still live there.

Poladpur also has a Sadguru temple build by Prabhakar Sheth. This temple has 70 idols of saints and Hindu gods found across India.

In 1893, a leprosy home was founded in Poladpur by Haripant Kelkar and Rev. J. B. Bawa. The hospital still exists today and is run by The Leprosy Mission.

In 2018, a bus carrying 34 passengers fell into a gorge in Poladpur while traveling to Mahabaleshwar. Only 1 person survived.
