= Mahad =

City & Sub-district in Maharashtra, India

Mahād Raigad Nagari
- City & Sub-district
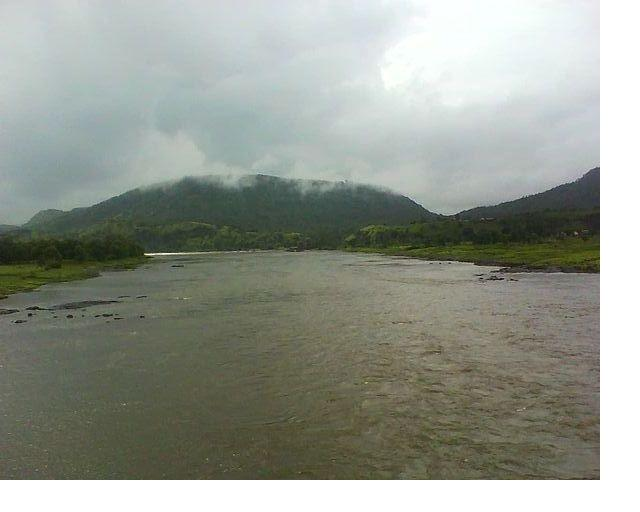
- Savitri River near Mahad

- Location in Maharashtra, India
- Coordinates: 18.083°N 73.417°E
- Country: India
- State: Maharashtra
- Division: Konkan
- District: Raigad
- Sub-district: Mahad
- Mahad City Municipal Council: 1866 A.D.

Government
  - Type: Municipal Council
  - Body: Mahad City Municipal Council

Area
  - Total: 12 km^{2} (4.6 sq mi)
- Elevation: 18 m (59 ft)

Population (2011)
  - Total: 180,191
  - Density: 15,000/km^{2} (39,000/sq mi)
- Demonym(s): Mahadkar, Raigadkar

Languages
  - Official: Marathi
  - Regional: Konkani, Agri-Koli

Sex Ratio and Literacy in Semi-Urban region (Mahad City)
  - Sex Ratio: 963 Females : 1000 Males
  - Literacy: 94%
- Time zone: UTC+5:30 (IST)
- PIN: 402301 (Mahad City), 402309 (Mahad MIDC/Birwadi)
- Telephone code: 02145
- Vehicle registration: MH-06
- Website: www.raigad.nic.in

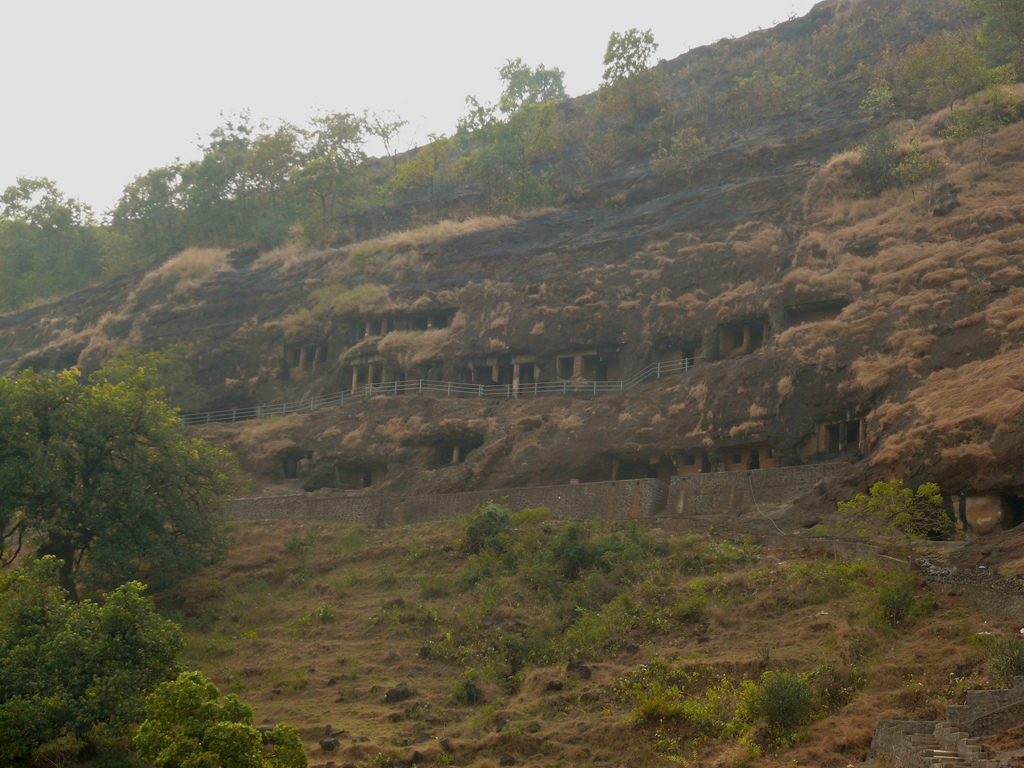
Gandharpale Buddhist Caves/Pandava Leni

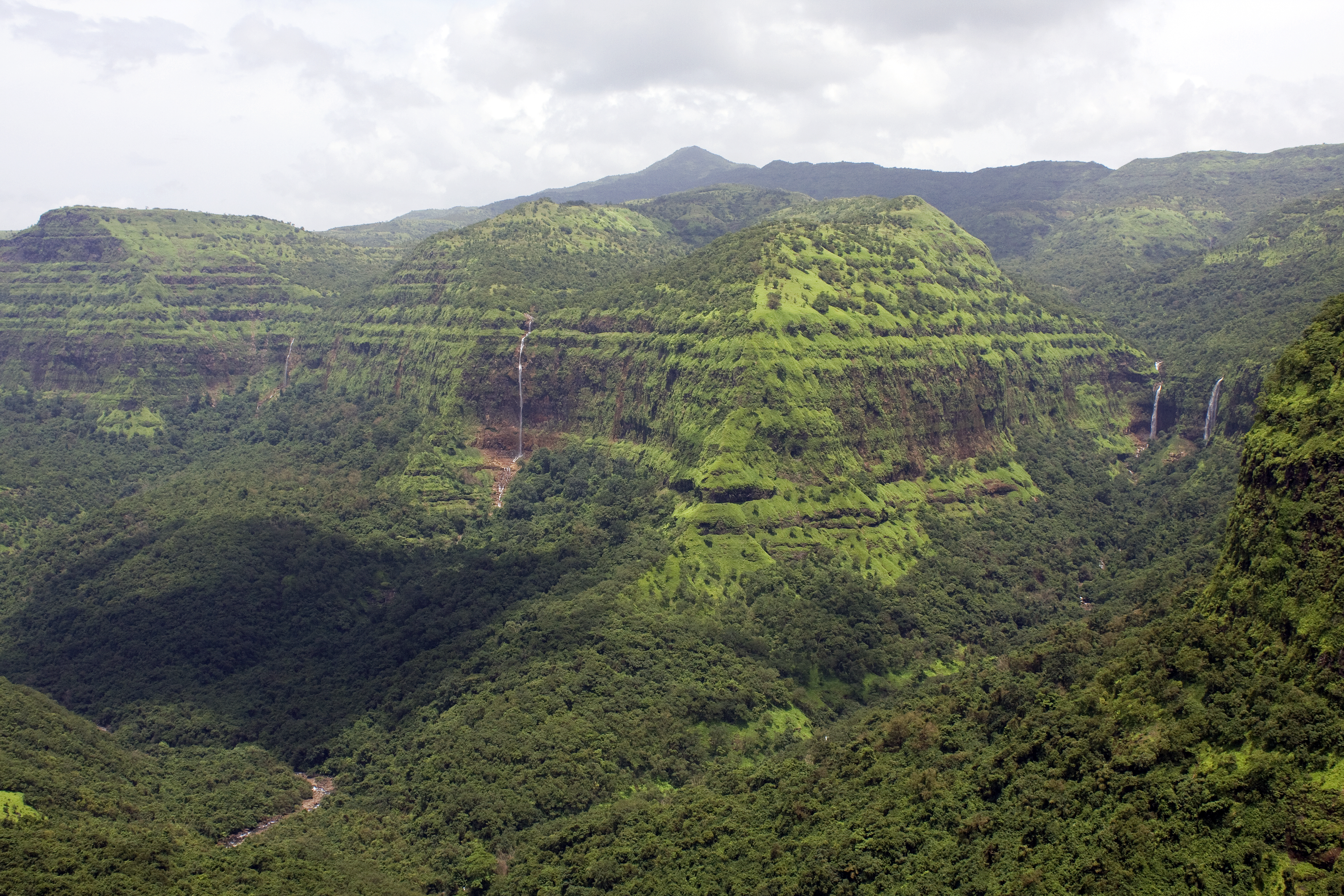
Varandha Ghat

Mahad ( [məɦaːɖ]) is a city in Raigad district (formerly Kulaba district) situated in the North Konkan region of Maharashtra state, India. It is located 108.5 km (67.4 mi) from District Headquarters Alibag, and 167 km (104 mi) from Mumbai. Mahad is known for Raigad Fort, the capital of the Maratha Empire in Shivaji Maharaj's era and the revolutionary Mahad Satyagraha launched by (Dr Babasaheb Ambedkar) at Chavdar Tale (Tasty Lake) in the wake of modern India.

== History ==
Mahad, a town nestled in the Konkan region (History of Mahad) of Maharashtra, India, holds a significant historical and cultural legacy. With a rich past that dates back to ancient times, Ma-had has witnessed the rise and fall of empires, played a vital role in the Indian independence movement, and now stands as a thriving modern town.

=== Chavdaar Tale Satyagraha ===
It is known for the Chavdaar Tale's satyagraha of Bhimrao Ambedkar at Chavdar Tale, which is a large public water tank in Mahad town. Ambedkar with his followers of over 2,500 Dalits marched to the tank. In March, a few upper caste people also participated, who used to admire Bhimrao's ideology. Ambedkar was the first to take his hand and sip water from the tank, followed by the rest. This was a revolutionary step for the time and broke the taboo of caste discrimination. This came to be known as the Mahad Satyagraha. Many disciples of the Buddha and followers of B.R. Ambedkar visit Chavdaar Tale every year on Kranti Din (Day of Revolution).

However, this was not the end of the struggle. There was tremendous backlash from the rest of the community and some even performed a purification ritual to counter the act of revolution. Ambedkar made another statement by burning the Hindu book Manusmriti at the very same spot on 25 December 1927.

=== Chhatrapati Shivaji Maharaj and Raigad fort ===
Mahad has a glorious history during the rule of the Maratha king Shivaji. The capital of Hindavi Swarajya and the Samadhi of Chhatrapati Shivaji is at Raigad fort, which is around 24 km (15 mi) from the city. It was part of Birwadi Subha (Tehsil) and was ruled by Birwadi Subhedar's Kadams (Mahamunkars). The village of Umarath Tanaji Malusare & Kinjaloli of Murarbaji are also in the vicinity of Mahad.

==== Shivtharghal and Daasbodh ====
The Shivtharghal is the birthplace of Samarth Ramdas, author of the spiritual book Dasbodh.

==== Mahad Port ====
Mahad was a flourishing port in the past. The Gul (Jaggery) of Shahupuri Kolhapur and Satara was exported to Gujarat via Mahad. Since the banks of the Savitri river changed during the course of time, only creek water fishing is carried out and Mahad is no longer a port.

=== Gandharpale Buddhist Caves ===
According to the mythological story, Gandharpale Caves are the sculptured houses built in one night by the Pandavas. Originally these caves are Buddhist caves build during the reign of Vishnupalita Kambhoja.

=== 2016 Flood in Savitri river ===
In 2016, a major flood hit Mahad because of the collapse of the British era bridge on Mumbai-Goa highway and caused great losses. The incident resulted in the loss of 42 lives.

Several disasters like floods and landslides have continuously devastated markets and old houses, specifically classic raw houses, causing great loss of life. This is primarily due to lower elevation of the city compared to surrounding areas and being surrounded by rivers on all sides, making the city like a triangular island. Also, Konkan, receives predominantly very heavy rainfall in comparison to rest of Maharashtra.

== Geography ==
Mahad is situated at southernmost tip of Raigad district in Konkan region at an altitude of 59 ft (18 m) and is surrounded by Sahyadri Mountains. Savitri river originates from Savitri Point in Mahabaleshwar and flows through Mahad to the delta in Arabian sea via Bankot.

Mahad has a tropical climate and witnesses heavy rainfall during monsoon. Summers are very hot and winters are cold with a thick fog lay over city during morning hours. Mahad receives the highest rainfall in Raigad district because of the rain catcher forest of Raigad Fort Natural Reserve and famous hill station Mahabaleshwar. Mahad receives an average annual rainfall above 4,000 mm (160 in). Mahad has a favorable climate for the growth of alphonso mango and coconut trees.

== Demographic ==
As of 2011 India Census, Mahad has a population of 180,191.

== Tourist attractions nearby ==
Raigad, popularly known as "Gateway of Konkan", is among the city's tourist destinations. Other attractions include:

- Raigad Fort
- Pratapgad Fort
- Gandhar Pale Buddhist Caves
- Shivthar Ghal
- Lingana Fort
- Birwadi Fort
- Warandha Ghat
- Mulshi-Tamhini Ghat (Bhira)
- Poladpur
- Mahabaleshwar
- Vireshwar Temple
- Chavdaar Tale
- Walan kond
- Mandala waterfall
- Sav hot water spring
- Kol caves
- Mandangad
- Hari-Hareshwar, Shrivardhan and Diveagar Beach
- Dapoli-Mandangad Beach

== Etymology ==
The word "Mahad" is derived from Konkani-marathi words "महा" (Mahā) and "हाट" (Market)."महा" meaning "Great or big" and "हाट" meaning "market", collectively meaning "a big market".

The oldest reference of Mahad is found in historical documents in 225 BC. Around 130 AD, Mahad was under rule of Buddhist king Vishnu Pulit of Kambhoja dynasty. He built the Gandharpale caves opposite to Mahad port. Under his rule, Mahad was a port and business center which continued until British Raj. The development of Mahad as a business center continued under the rule of Yadavas of Deogiri in the 13th century. Yadavas were the first make Marathi the official language of Maharashtra. Mahad was taken by British in 1818 and was a place of administrative work when Raigad fort was made the capital of Shivaji.

== Festivals ==
Mahad is one of the well-known holiday destinations in Konkan region. The festivals most celebrated by local people are Chabina (which falls in summer around the month of March) and Ganpati festival (which falls during the monsoon, around the month of September)., EID is well celebrated in this region, mahad has diversity in its population.

=== Shimga Festival ===
The most important festival among whole Konkani community spreading from Thane, Raigad to Goa and Karwar coast is "Shimga". It is speciality of "Konkan and Goa". Every City, every town or village has its own way of celebrating it. Almost every Konkani working day and night, sleeplessly in metropolis like Mumbai, Pune, Delhi or in foreign countries rush to their homeland during Shimga. People worship their local deities, fun-fairs are organized; the Palkhis of local deities are main attraction and is considered prestigious among locals. Each town represents its own religious culture and traditions.

==== Shimgotsav in Mahad ====
Vireshwar is the most-worshipped local deity of Mahad. The temple of Vireshwar was believed to be constructed during or before Shivaji's reign. A local fair is organised during shimga called "Mahad chi Jatra", uniquely known as "Chabina Utsav of Mahad". The "Palkhis" of seven sisters of Vireshwar who are Gram-devi (goddess) of nearby villages and towns like Mangaon, Poladpur and Khed are brought at Vireshwar Temple in Mahad. Goddess Zolai Devi is considered the most favorite sister of Vireshwar. The people are so devoted that they bring Palkhis from many miles far villages by walking, sometimes bare-footed, they consider this holy and sacred and feel lucky to be part of it.

Eid

== Economy ==
=== Central Market ===
Mahad was the central market for people of Poladpur, the Raigad villages and the hill station Mahabaleshwar. The city is surrounded by the Sahyadri mountain ranges and the Savitri, Kal and Gandhari rivers originating through Mahabaleswar, hills in Mulshi and Raigad fort respectively. Mahad was a flourishing port in the past. "Mahadi Gul" was well known in Gujarat, which is made in Satara, Pune district and exported to other locations through Mahad's port.

=== Mahad M.I.D.C. and Economic Corridor ===
==== Mahad MIDC ====
Mahad is now well-developed with town infrastructure. Mahad MIDC which is set up near Birwadi is the small Chemical industry cluster. It houses several polymer, pharmaceutical, organic, pigments, fertilizers, aroma chemical manufacturing industries. Notable industries are -

- Pidilite
- Piramal Healthcare
- Sandoz
- Vinati Organic
- Lakshmi Organic
- Hikal Ltd.
- Maharashtra Aldehydes
- Sudarshan
- Maharashtra Seamless
- EMBIO
- Privi Organics India Limited
- BlueJet HealthCare Limited

Mahad consists of two Industrial zones - Mahad-Birwadi and Mahad Additional Industrial zone.

==== Bharatmala ====
Mahad is part of proposed Panvel-Mahad-Chiplun-Panjim Economic corridor under Bharatmala Project.

== Civic Administration ==
Mahad falls under the Raigad Lok Sabha Constituency, along with Pen, Alibaug, Shrivardhan, Dapoli and Guhagar. In 2019, Sunil Tatkare from NCP won the Lok Sabha Seat for the constituency.

== Transport ==
=== Airways ===
Nearest airports:

- Navi Mumbai International Airport, Ulve-Panvel, Navi Mumbai
- CSIA, Mumbai
- Pune International Airport, Lohagaon, Pune

=== Railway ===
Konkan railway line starts from Roha-Kolad and exits Raigad district via Veer. Main railway stations in Mahad is Veer railway station.

=== Road ===
National Highway NH 66 (previously known as NH 17) passes through Mahad. It connects Panvel (Southern Navi-Mumbai) to Kanyakumari, passing through the states of Maharashtra, Goa, Karnataka, Kerala, and Tamil Nadu.

=== MSRTC ===
Maharashtra State Road Transport Corporation has a bus depot at Mahad for public transport. Buses plying from Khed, Chiplun, Ratnagiri have halt at Mahad MSRTC Bus depot.

=== GSRTC ===
Many people from Mahad commute to cities like Surat, Vapi and Valsad in Gujarat from even before the Independence. For inter-state public transport, Gujarat State Road Transport Corporation started buses from Mahad and Poladpur bus stand which are under operations of Mahad MSRTC Bus Depot to Surat and other cities of Gujarat.
