= Birwadi =

- Census town
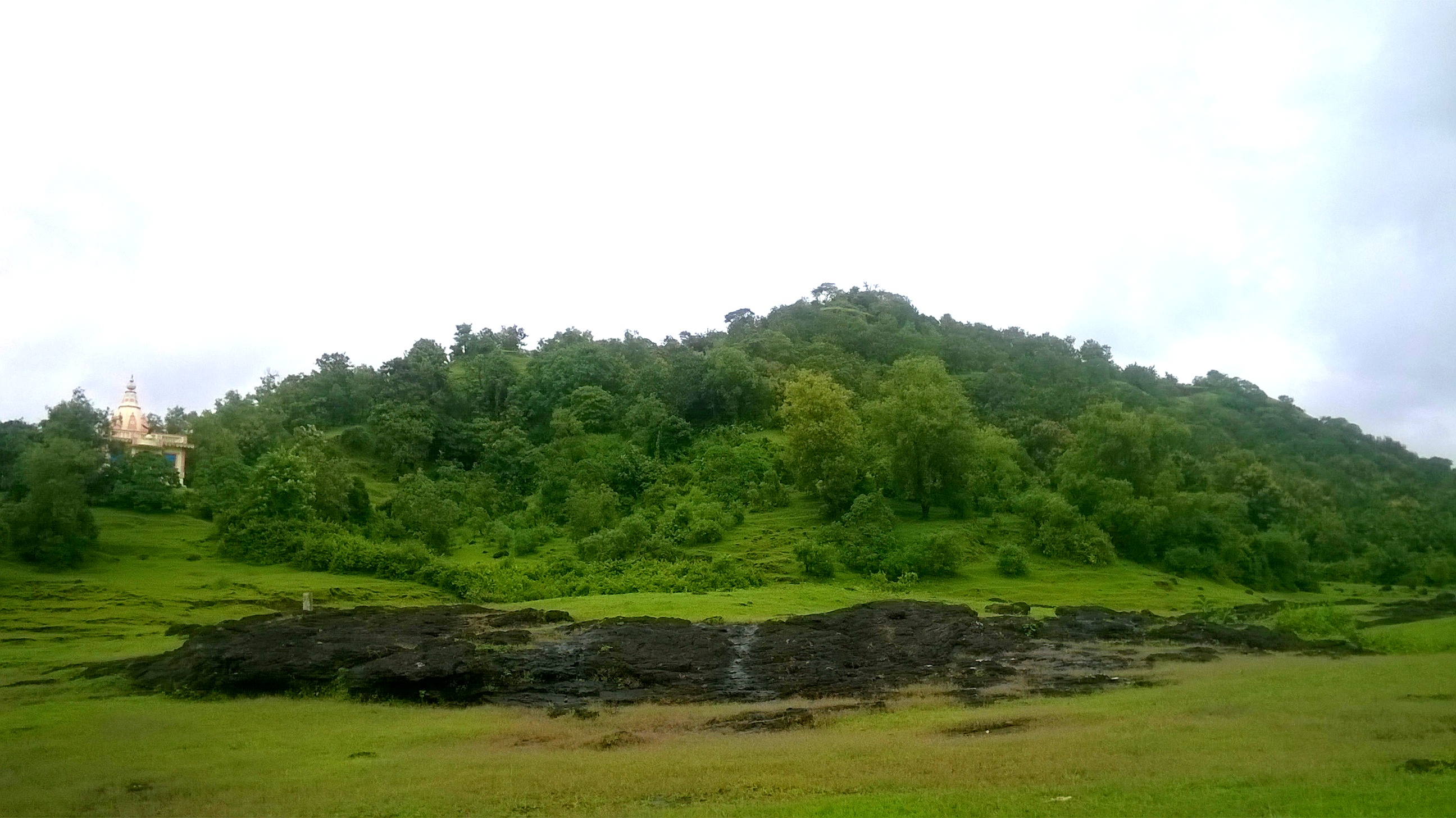
- Birwadi fort, seen from Birwadi village

- Location in Maharashtra, India
- Coordinates: 18.100°N 73.508°E
- Country: India
- State: Maharashtra
- District: Raigad

Population (2001)
  - Total: 7,271

Languages
  - Official: Marathi
- Time zone: UTC+5:30 (IST)

Birwadi is a census town in Raigad district in the state of Maharashtra, India.

== Demographics ==
As of 2001 India census, Birwadi had a population of 7271. Males constitute 54% of the population and females 46%. Birwadi has an average literacy rate of 75%, higher than the national average of 59.5%; with male literacy of 80% and female literacy of 68%. 16% of the population is under 6 years of age.
