= Maloji Bhosale =

Maratha general (1552–c. 1605)

Maloji Bhonsale
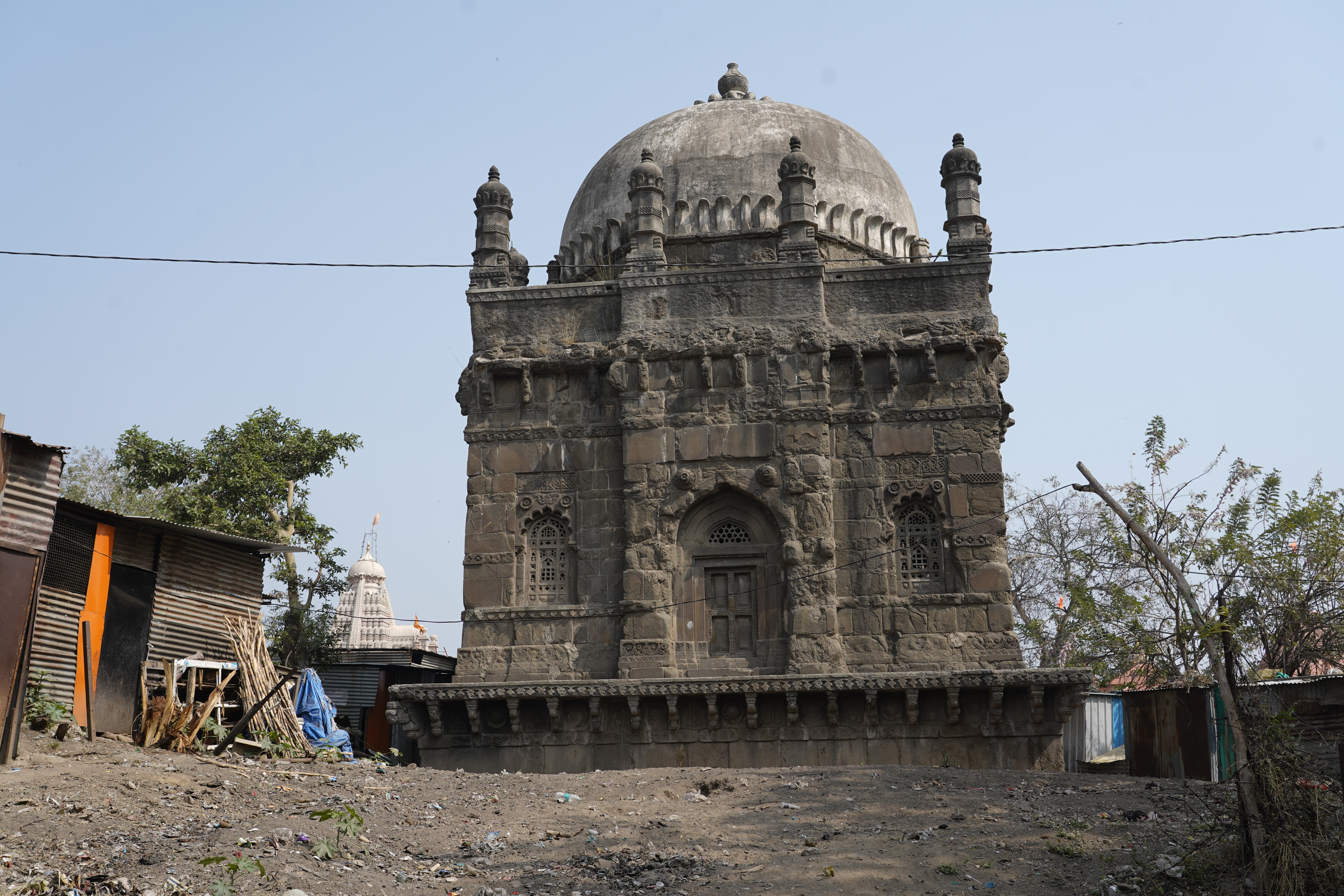
- Samadhi of Maloji Bhonsale
- Born: Maloji Babaji Bhonsale c.1552
- Died: c. 1605 (aged 52–53); Indapur, Bijapur Sultanate
- Title: Sardar
- Children: Shahaji; Sharifji
- Parent: Babaji Bhosale (father)
- Relatives: Vithoji (brother); Jijabai (daughter-in-law); Shivaji (grandson); Lakshoji Bhonsle (grandfather); Krishnaji Bhonsle (great-grandfather)

Maloji Bhonsale (c. 1552 – 1605) was a Maratha chief (Sardar) who served the Ahmadnagar Sultanate. He was the father of Shahaji and the grandfather of Shivaji, the founder of the Maratha Empire.

== Early life ==
Maloji was born in 1552 to Babaji Bhosale (d. 1597), a Patil (chief) of the Hingani Berdi and Devalgaon villages around Pune. Maloji also had a younger brother, Vithoji.

== Military career under the Jadhavs of Sindkhed ==
Maloji and his brother Vithoji migrated away from Pune, and initially served as cavalrymen under the Jadhavs of Sindkhed. The Jadhavs provided military service to the Ahmednagar Sultanate. Maloji married Uma Bai (also known as Dipa Bai), the sister of Jagpalrao Nimbalkar, who was the Deshmukh of Phaltan.

According to Shiva Digvijaya, Maloji's wife Umabai allegedly prayed at the tomb of Ahmadnagar's Sufi Pir Shah Sharif, to be blessed with a son. Afterwards when Maloji and Umabai settled in Devagiri, Umabai went on to give birth to two sons, first of whom was Shahaji and second one was Sharifji, born two years later.

According to one account, during a Holi function, the Jadhav chief Lakhuji remarked, in a lighter vein, that his daughter Jijabai and Shahaji would make a fine couple. Maloji took Lakhuji's remark seriously, and announced publicly that his son was engaged to Lakhuji's daughter. This irked Lakhuji, who considered Maloji to be a lower-ranking Shiledar. He dismissed Maloji from his services. Later, Nimbalkar's influence and the rising status of the Bhosale family helped Shahaji marry Jijabai.

== Ahmednagar Sultanate service ==
According to Shedgaonkar Bakhar, presumably composed after 1854 and rejected by historians like Jadunath Sarkar, Maloji and Vithoji once found a treasure while tilling a field and became rich.

In 1577, like the Nimbalkars, the two brothers joined the service of the Ahmednagar Sultanate, under Murtaza Nizam Shah I. Maloji became a trusted aide of Malik Amber, who rose to the Prime Ministership of the Ahmadnagar Sultanate. Maloji's cousins, the Ghorpades of Mudhol, also became successful noblemen, serving the rival Sultanate of Bijapur.

Maloji rose rapidly in the service of Malik Ambar, fighting against the rival Deccan Sultanates and the Mughals. He and his brother were granted the control of three parganas (administrative units): Elur (Verul), Derhadi and Kannarad (including Jategau and Vakadi), beside several small towns and villages. In 1595 or 1599, Maloji was given the title of raja by Bahadur Nizam Shah, the ruler of the Ahmednagar Sultanate. On the recommendation of Malik Ambar, he was given the jagir of Pune and Supe parganas, along with the control of the Shivneri and Chakan forts. Maloji carried out the restoration of the Grishneshwar temple near Verul, and also constructed a large tank at the Shambhu Mahadev temple in Shikhar Shingnapur. Maloji Bhonsale's memorial is just outside the Ghrishneshwar temple.

== Death ==
Maloji died during a battle against the Bijapur Sultanate, at Indapur. One account puts his year of death as 1605, and mentions that his son Shahaji, five-years old at the time, was raised by his brother Vithoji. Other accounts put the year of his death as 1620 or 1622. After his death, his jagir was transferred to his son Shahaji.
