= Swapnil Rajshekhar =

Indian film actor and writer

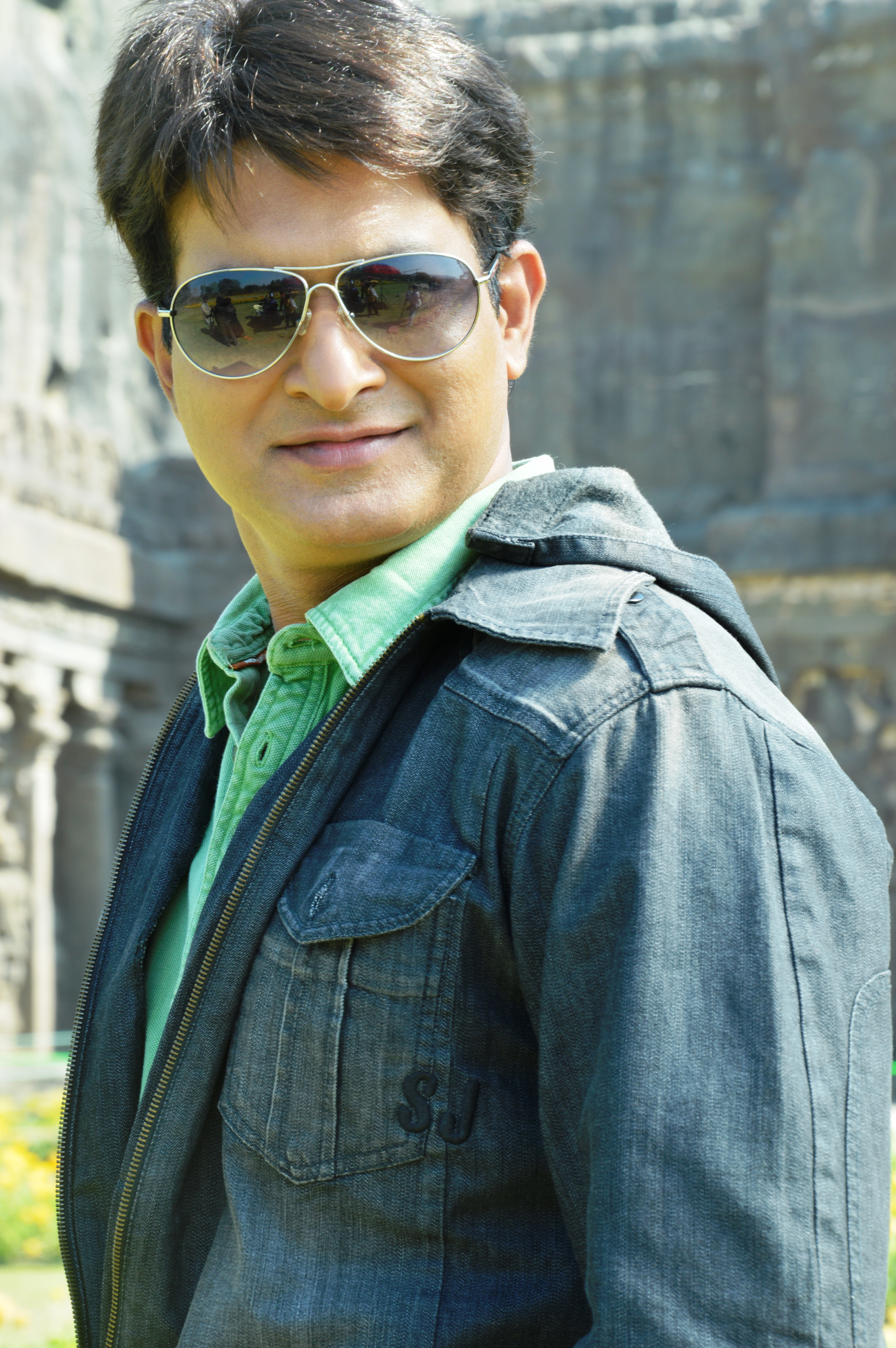
- Born: Kolhapur, Maharashtra, India
- Occupation: Actor
- Years active: 1995 - present
- Parent: Rajshekhar (Janardan Bhutkar)

Swapnil Rajshekhar Bhutkar is an Indian actor and writer, most known for his roles in various Marathi television series.

He has been a popular anchor, host of various musical shows, and as a singer has performed in a great number of musical shows with various groups. He was the winner of Zee TV's Antakshari – Goa award in 1997. He is from Kolhapur, Maharashtra, India.

== Early life ==
Swapnil was born in Kolhapur, Maharashtra. His father Rajshekhar (Janardan Bhutkar) was a great actor and one of the finest thespians of the Marathi film industry. Janardan had nurtured the dream of acting in cinemas and in its pursuit came to Kolhapur, during his struggling years he stayed at his sister’s place and would regularly visit Jayaprabha Studio. His life took turn when he happened to meet "Bhalji Pendharkar". Bhalji saw the talent in Janardan Bhutkar and offered him small role in Akashaganga. Bhalaji changed his name from Janardan to Rajshekhar. It is with this last name that Swapnil debuted in films, and, for all public purposes, he used Rajshekhar as his last name.

His mother Vaishali Rajshekhar also had a keen interest in acting and has done several Marathi Films and Theatre. Swapnil attended the "Private High School" in Kolhapur, and later went on to study in "New College Kolhapur" to complete his Sociology Degree. He then joined the theatre.

== Career ==
Making his debut as a child artist at the age of seven with Govind Kulkarni’s Tamasgeer, he followed up with Fukat Chambu Baburao.

Following this he joined theatre at the age of twenty. He’s acted in various play’s like Vatrat Karti, Prema Tuzha Rang Kasa?, Niyam ani Apavaad – which was a Marathi remake of Sir Bertolt Brecht's The Exception and the Rule and Sheetyudh Sadanand.

Along with acting in these plays to directing a few which includes Ratrani, Kshan, Girhaik, Chaukashi, Rikshawala, Trailer... to name a few. He has also directed a few industrial and social documentaries as well as advertisements including AIDS awareness.

Swapnil started his television career with Doordarshan in 1995 and acted in TV series such as Kondmara, Shejar, Bhoomiputra, Reshimgathi for Zee Marathi. He has also modeled for Bajaj Tempo Traveller, Elf Engine Oil and Birla Plus Cement TVC's.

In the year 1997 he acted in his first feature film Pratidaav, a film about how two political families in a village continuously fight for the same position. Swapnil played a negative character in the film. This was followed by a role in a romantic musical comedy called Sang Priye Tu Konachi? in the year 1999.

Since then he has done over fifty films including Hirva Kunku, Apharan, Bhavachi Laxmi, Achanak, Lek Ladki. In 2010-2011, he acted in Bhandara, Chandrakala, Natha Purey Aata, Durga Mhantyat Mala, Rajmata Jijau, Balgandharva, Saat Bara Kasa Badalala, Teen Bayka Fajiti Aika. He is also featured in High Command directed by Yashwant Bhalkar about the Maharashtra-Karnataka border dispute.

Then in the year 2012 and since came Janmadata, Rama Shiva Govinda, Haa Khel Jivashi, Shikshanacha Jai Ho, Premshakti, Aabhas, Angaraki.

He has also been a part of Punha Gondhal Punha Mujra directed by Balkrishna Shinde; this film is a sequel of the 2009 release Marathi film Gallit Gondhal Dillit Mujra. The film marked the debut of Bollywood Actors Alok Nath and Ashish Vidyarthi. He was seen in lead role in Gorakh Jogdande's Nazar, which released in the year 2015.

He was also a part of the musical extravaganza Katyar Kaljat Ghusali, as the Maharaja of Vishrampur, King Vishnuraj which was the directorial debut of Subodh Bhave

His first release in the year 2016, was Police Line... Ek Purna Satya, directed by Raju Parsekar. He then did Manus Ek Mati, Directed by Suresh Zhade, which released in March 2017.

He is currently doing a theatrical play called Vidamban Ekach Pyala written by Acharya Pralhad Keshav Atre. Vidamban (Parody) as the name suggests is based originally on Ram Ganesh Gadkari's play Sangeet Ekach Pyala. The play is directed by Satish Pulekar. Swapnil plays a character called Ramlal in the play.

His next film is set to release in November 2017, titled Maza Algaar, where he plays the role of a Mahant (Saint).

== Writer and Director ==
Swapnil Rajshekhar, has directed a social documentary film titled Ekla Chalo Re, which was released online on YouTube in December, 2015.

He later wrote another short film titled Baluta, which was directed by Ajay Kurane, which released in June 2016, for which he has received an award for the Best Screenplay at the first Haryana International Film Festival in the same year. Baluta, has also received various other awards at different National and International Film Festivals all over India in different categories.

He then went on to write and direct another short film later in the year 2016, the film is titled Saavat, for which he has received numerous awards including Best Screenplay, Jury at the 5th Mumbai Shorts International Film Festival and Best Director at the 4th Sangli International Film Festival.

Saavat has received a total of thirty three awards till now at various national and international film festivals all over India, which includes awards for Best Film, Best Writing, Best Direction, Best Cinematography, Best Editing, Best Actor, Best Actress and so on.

== Awards and nominations ==
- 2010: Nominated in Marathi TV Biggies Awards for "Best Actor in a Negative Role" for Khel Mandla (TV Series) [Mi Marathi]
- 2012: Won "Gumphan Award for Excellence in the Field of Entertainment"
- 2015: Documentary Film, Ekla Chalo Re was nominated in the "4th My Mumbai Short Film Festival".
- 2016: Won an Award for Best Screenplay, for the Short Film titled Baluta at the first Haryana International Film Festival 2016.
- 2016: Won an Award for Best Screenplay, Jury at the 5th Mumbai Shorts International Film festival for a Short Film titled Saavat
- 2017: Won an Award as the Best Director at the 4th Sangli International Film Festival for the Short Film Saavat
- 2017: Won an Award as the Best Director at the 2nd Karad National Short Film Festival for the Short Film Saavat
- 2017: Won an Award as the Best Director at the 7th Gujarat International Short Film Festival for the Short Film Saavat
- 2017: Nominated in Zebra International Film Festival, for Best Story, for the Short Film Baluta

== Television ==
- Raja Shivchhatrapati (as Netaji Palkar)
- Kulaswamini (as Yashodhan Inamdar)
- Khel Mandala (as Wakade Sarkar)
- Veer Shivaji (as Kanhoji Jedhe)
- Swapnanchya Palikadle (as Kaushal Nimkar)
- Ajunahi Chandraat Aahe (as Suryakant Sarnoubat)
- Char Divas Sasuche (as Rajan Phadke)
- Jhunj Marathmoli
- Jai Malhar (as Indra Dev)
- Swarajyarakshak Sambhaji (as Ganoji shirke)
- Asava Sundar Swapnancha Bangla (as Rajshekhar Purohit)
- Tula Shikvin Changlach Dhada (as Charuhas Suryavanshi)

== Filmography ==
- ReelStar (2025)
