= Gomaji Naik =

- Naik
- Born: near Sindkhed Raja, Buldhana District
- Monarch: Lakhuji Jadhav
- Occupation: Teacher, Administrator

Gomaji Naik Pansambal was a warrior and military adviser in the army of Shivaji Maharaj, founder of the Maratha Empire in 17th century India. Gomaji was deputed by Lakhuji Jadhavrao. He was also a guru of Shivaji, also taught him artillery and the practice of war, especially the lance and guerilla warfare, the characteristic Maratha weapon.

== Bibliography ==
- Duff, Grant - History of the Marhattas, Oxford University Press, London.
