= Netaji Palkar =

Senapati of the Maratha Empire from 1657 to 1666

Netoji Palkar
- Senapati; Sarnaubat

2nd Senapati of the Maratha Empire
- Reign: 1657–1666
- Predecessor: Mankoji Dahatonde
- Successor: Prataprao Gujar
- Monarch: Shivaji I
- Born: 1620; Khalapur, Ahmadnagar Sultanate (present-day Raigad District, Maharashtra, India)
- Died: 1681 (aged 60–61); Tamsa, Mahurgad province, Maratha Empire (present-day Nanded district, Maharashtra, India)
- House: Palkar
- Religion: Hinduism; Islam (converted); Hinduism (reconverted)

Netoji Palkar (Marathi pronunciation: [neːʈod͡ʒiː paːlkəɾ]; 1620–1681), was the 2nd Senapati of the Maratha Army under the leadership of Chhatrapati Shivaji, the visionary founder of the Maratha Empire. He was also known as "Second Shivaji" (Prati-Shivaji in Marathi) due to his brilliant cavalry commanding skills.

== Background ==
Netoji Palkar was born in the Shirur, Pune district into the Palkar family of the Maratha caste.

== Military career ==
Netoji was appointed as Senapati in 1657, following the demise of Mankoji Dahatonde. Throughout the period of Shivaji's ascendancy from 1645 to 1665, Netaji was entrusted with the leadership of numerous expeditions, all of which he executed with remarkable success. His most notable achievement was the campaign against the Adilshah of the Bijapur Sultanate, which ensued after the assassination of Afzal Khan. His reputation among the local populace was so profound that he earned the moniker "Prati Shivaji," signifying his embodiment of the image of Chhatrapati Shivaji.

He significantly disrupted the Mughal territories until the year 1665, and his failure to communicate the actions of Jai Singh and Dilerkhan left Shivaji deeply disappointed. Following the Treaty of Purandar in 1665, between Jai Singh and Shivaji, Shivaji was compelled to relinquish control of 23 forts to the Mughals and engage in hostilities against the Adilshah of Bijapur. During this period, Netaji Palkar switched allegiance to the forces of Adilshah, a strategic move orchestrated by Chhatrapati Shivaji to diminish his own military strength, as Aurangzeb sought Shivaji's support in his campaigns. Consequently, Shivaji's maneuvering successfully prevented the Mughals from subduing Adilshah, in line with his intended outcome.

After Shivaji's meeting with Aurangzeb in Agra, Netaji Palkar joined the service of Jai Singh. Subsequently, when Shivaji managed to escape from Agra, Mirza Raja fell out of favor with Aurangzeb.

== Arrest and conversion ==
After Shivaji's escape from Agra, Aurangzeb, seeking retribution, issued an order to Jai Singh to apprehend Netaji Palkar. Netaji Palkar was subsequently detained at Dharur Fort for a brief period. It is also recorded that during this time, Jijabai, Chhatrapati Shivaji's mother, sent funds to Jai Singh in response to Shivaji's request for distributing sweets in Agra. Netaji Palkar, eventually, underwent a conversion to Islam. His wives were later transported to Delhi and similarly underwent conversion, enabling Netaji to remarry them according to Islamic customs. Assuming the name of Muhammad Quli Khan, Netaji Palkar was appointed as the garrison commander of Kandahar Fort in Afghanistan. His attempt to escape was ultimately foiled, leading to his capture in Lahore. Subsequently, on the battlefields of Kandahar and Kabul, he fought on behalf of the Mughals against insurgent Pashtuns, thus earning the trust and favor of Aurangzeb. This resulted in his deployment to the Deccan, along with Commander Diler Khan, with the aim of subduing Shivaji's territories.

After arriving in Deccan, Netaji joined forces with Shivaji's troops and traveled to Raigad. Consequently, following a decade of captivity under the Mughal rule, Netaji presented himself at the court of Chhatrapati Shivaji, requesting reintegration into the Hindu faith. He underwent a formal re-conversion to Hinduism by the orders of Shivaji. After 1666, he retired from involvement in the Maratha campaigns. In 1665, the position of Senapati was bestowed upon Prataprao Gujar.

== Death ==
He died in 1681, due to natural causes associated with old age in Tamsa village, Nanded.

== Popular culture ==
=== Films and television ===
- In Raja Shivchhatrapati (2008), a Marathi historical TV serial aired on Star Pravah, Swapnil Rajshekhar played the role of Netaji Palkar.
- In the 2011 Indian Marathi-language historical film Rajmata Jijau, he is portrayed by Deepak Karpe.
- In the 2011-2012 Indian historical TV serial Veer Shivaji, he is portrayed by Amit Pachori.
- In the 2022 Marathi-language Indian historical film Pawankhind, he is portrayed by Vikram Gaikwad.
- In the 2022 Indian Marathi-language historical film Sher Shivraj, he is portrayed by Sachin Deshpande.
