= Shahaji =

Father of Shivaji Bhonsle and eldest son of Maloji Raje Bhonsle (1594–1664)

Shahaji Bhonsale
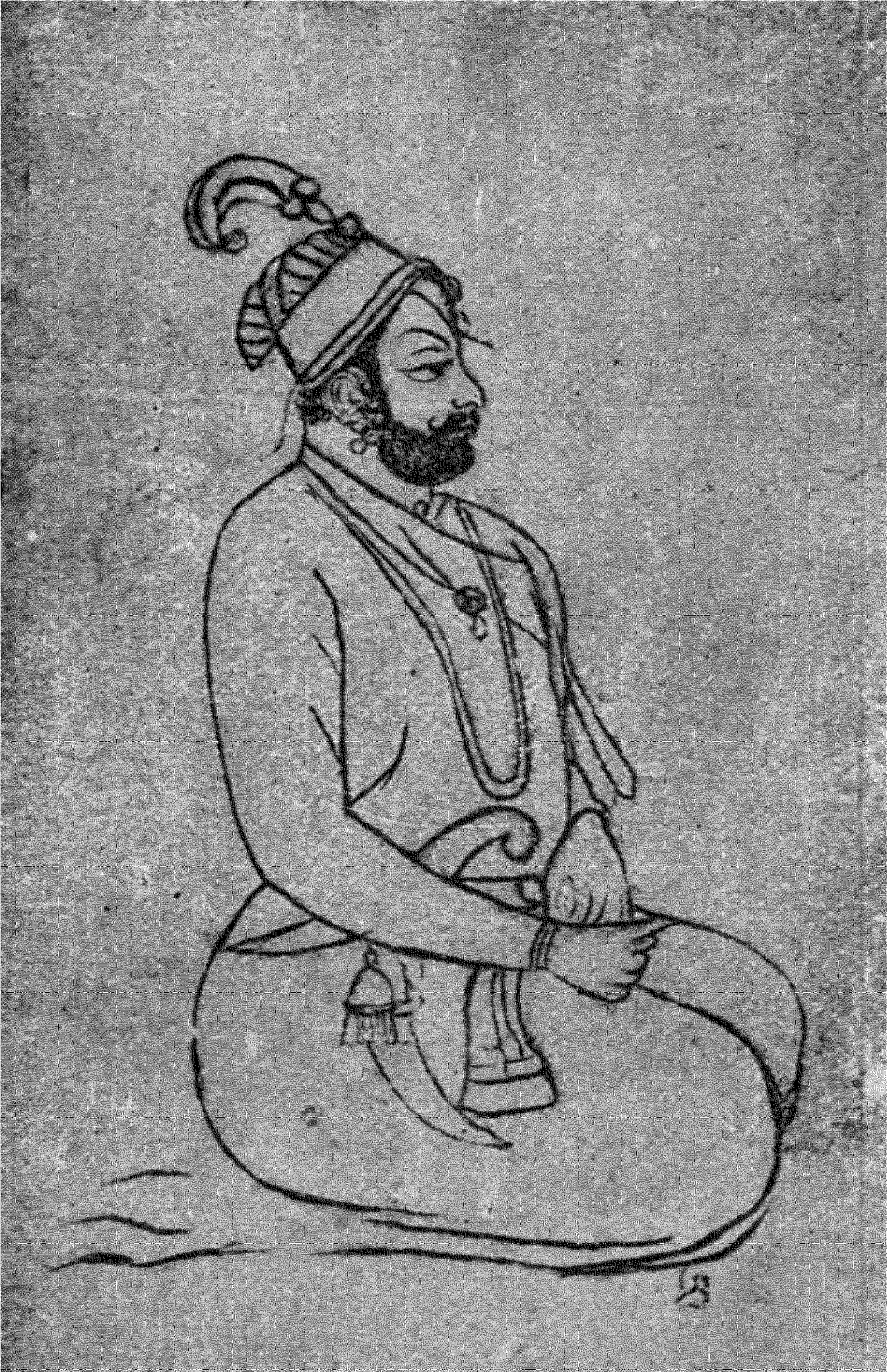
- 1923 sketch depicting Shahaji

Jagirdar of Pune in Bijapur Sultanate
- Predecessor: Maloji
- Successor: Shivaji

Jagirdar of Bangalore in Bijapur Sultanate
- Predecessor: Position Created
- Successor: Ekoji
- Predecessor: Position Created
- Successor: Sambhaji

Jagirdar of Pune in Ahmednagar Sultanate
- Predecessor: Maloji
- Successor: Position de-established
- Born: 15 March 1594
- Died: 23 January 1664 (aged 69); Hodigere, Bijapur Sultanate (present-day Karnataka, India)
- Spouse: Jijabai Jadhav; Tukabai Mohite Chavan
- Issue: Sambhaji; Shivaji; Ekoji; Koyaji; Santaji; Pratapji; Bhivji; Raibhanji; Hiroji Farzand
- House: Bhonsle
- Father: Maloji
- Religion: Hinduism
- Occupation: Military General

Shahaji Bhonsale (Marathi pronunciation: [ʃəˈɦaːdʑiː ˈbʱos(ə)le]; 15 March 1594 – 23 January 1664) was a 17th-century Indian military leader who served the Ahmadnagar Sultanate, the Bijapur Sultanate, and the Mughal Empire at various points in his career. As a member of the Bhonsle dynasty, Shahaji inherited the Pune and Supe jagirs (fiefs) from his father Maloji, who previously served the Ahmadnagar Sultanate. During the Mughal invasion of the Deccan, Shahaji joined the Mughal forces and served under Emperor Shah Jahan for a short period. After being deprived of his jagirs, he defected to the Bijapur Sultanate in 1632 and regained control over Pune and Supe. In 1638, he received the jagir of Bangalore after Bijapur's invasion of Kempe Gowda III's territories. Afterwards, he became the chief general of Bijapur and oversaw its expansion. He was the father of Shivaji, the founder of the Maratha Kingdom.

== Early life ==
Shahaji was born on 15 March 1594 to Maloji Bhosale, a Maratha warrior and nobleman who had been awarded the jagirs of Pune and Supe, Ellora, Dheradi, Kannrad and some more villages in the districts of Jafrabad, Daulatabad and Ahmadabad by Sultan Murtuza Nizamshah of Ahmadnagar. According to Shiva Digvijay, a text considered to be a modern forgery by historians such as Jadunath Sarkar and Surendra Nath Sen, Maloji's wife Umabai allegedly prayed in the tomb of Sufi Pir Shah Sharif of Ahmadnagar to be blessed with a son. Later when Maloji and Umabai settled in Devagiri, Umabai went on to give birth to two sons, first of whom was Shahaji and second one was Sharifji, born two years later. Both were named after the Pir's own titles. .

Shahaji was betrothed to Jijabai, the daughter of Lakhuji Jadhav, the Maratha Deshmukh of Sindkhed in the service of Ahmadnagar's Nizamshahi Sultanate, when both of them were children.

== Early career ==
Shahaji served in the army of Malik Ambar, the prime minister of Ahmadnagar Sultanate. At the time of Maloji's death in 1622, 26-year old Shahaji was a minor commander in Malik Ambar's army. By 1625, he held the high military position of Sar Lashkar (major general), as suggested by a letter sent from Pune on 28 July.

Ahmadnagar was involved in conflicts against the northern Mughal Empire and other Deccan Sultanates, and Shahaji kept switching his loyalty between these states. For example, sometime before the Battle of Bhatvadi in 1624, Shahaji and some other Maratha leaders defected to the Mughals, but shortly before the battle they returned to Ahmadnagar. Malik Ambar's army defeated a combined Mughal-Bijapur force in the battle. Subsequently, a quarrel arose between Shahaji and his cousin Kheloji Bhonsle, and in 1625 Shahaji shifted his allegiance to Bijapur, likely because he was dissatisfied with Ahmadnagar rewarding his relatives more than him. He retained his jagir in the Pune region, which was disputed between Ahmadnagar and Bijapur. A letter dated 10 January 1626 indicates that he still held the position of Sar Lashkar.

Ibrahim Adil Shah II, Shahaji's patron in Bijapur, died in September 1627. Adil Shah, a Muslim, was tolerant towards Hindus like Shahaji and saw Ahmadnagar as a buffer state between his kingdom and the Mughal Empire. After his death, an orthodox Muslim faction that advocated for an alliance with the Mughals against Ahmadnagar grew stronger in Bijapur. Amid these circumstances, Shahaji returned to Ahmadnagar in early 1628 under the patronage of Malik Ambar's son Fatah Khan. The power of Ahmadnagar had been declining after Malik Ambar's death in 1626, but Shahaji held a higher position there than the one he held in Bijapur. Meanwhile, the newly crowned Mughal Emperor Shah Jahan launched a fresh campaign against Ahmadnagar. In 1629, Shahaji led a 6,000-strong cavalry force against the Mughals in the Khandesh region but was defeated.

In 1630, Shahaji's in-laws and patrons were murdered as a result of factional politics in the Ahmadnagar court, leading to Shahaji's defection to the Mughals along with a 2,000-strong cavalry unit. The Mughals sent him to occupy Junnar and Sangamner and gave these districts to him as a jagir.

== War against the Mughals ==
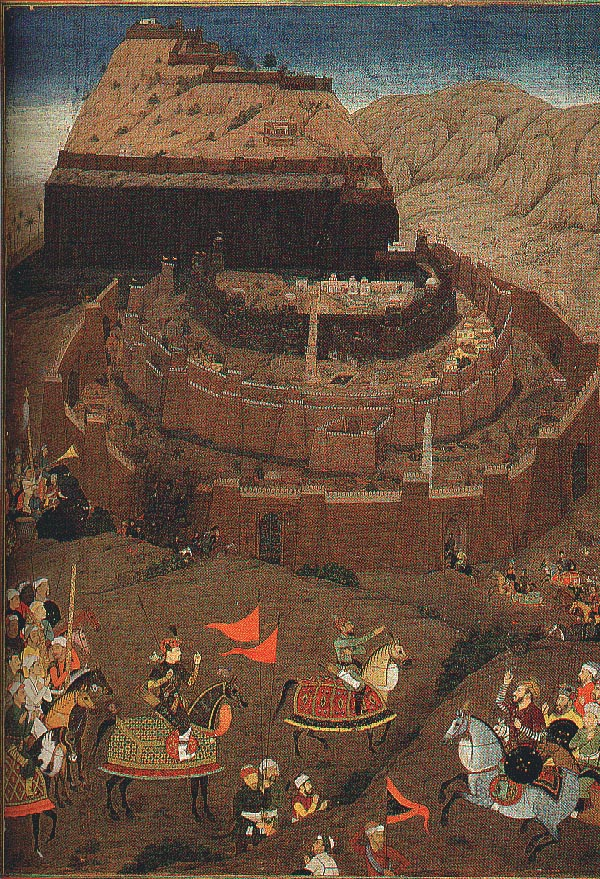
The Mughal Army captures Daulatabad Fort in the year 1633.

In 1632, Malik Ambar's son Fatah Khan placed a puppet ruler on the Ahmednagar throne and allied with the Mughals. As a reward, the Mughal emperor Shah Jahan granted him the jagir that had been earlier allotted to Shahaji. Shahaji then left the Mughal service and began to plunder the region around Pune. When the Mughals sent an army against him, he took shelter with Hussein Shah the governor of Junnar and subsequently returned to Bijapur service.

From 1630 to 1632, northern Maharashtra suffered from a severe famine, part of the Mahadurga famine. Bijapur sent an army to assist Ahmadnagar against the Mughals, who had besieged the Daulatabad fort, but the Mughals emerged victorious and captured the Ahmadnagar capital Daulatabad in 1632. Shahaji retreated and took control of an area in the southern part of the Sultanate. This area included lands in the triangle formed by connecting the cities of Nashik, Pune, and Ahmadnagar. Unlike southern Maharashtra, which was directly administered by the Bijapur government, this region was politically unstable because of the constant warfare between Ahmadnagar, Bijapur and the Mughals. The political control of the region had changed at least ten times from 1600 to 1635 with the government infrastructure in the area largely destroyed. Shahaji's control over the area was very weak, but he managed to maintain an army of 2,000-10,000 men and provided services to the Ahmadnagar troops fleeing their state after the Mughal conquest.

Meanwhile, in Daulatabad, the Mughals imprisoned the nominal king of Ahamadnagar. Shahaji installed 10-year old Murtaza of the Ahamadnagar royal family as the titular puppet ruler and appointed himself chief minister. Within a year, Shahaji's army captured Junnar and a large part of the northern Konkan region. Shahaji resided in Junnar and raised an army, which at its height numbered 12,000 soldiers. The strength of the army kept changing because of the changing loyalties of the various subordinate chiefs including Ghatge, Kate, Gaikwad, Kank, Chavan, Mohite, Mahadik, Pandhre, Wagh, and Ghorpade. Shahaji set up his capital at Shahabad and gained control of several large forts. A contemporary Brahmin newsletter from Bijapur states that the area controlled by Shahaji, not including his jagir of Pune and Indapur, yielded 7.5 million rupees in annual revenue. This estimate was based on the potential rather than the actual revenue; the area had been devastated by war and famine and the actual revenue collected was likely far less. The warring armies had destroyed several villages in the area to deny their enemies income, and most of the remaining villages yielded taxes only when forced to do so. According to the newsletter, Shahaji's forces included a 3,000-man cavalry plus an additional 2,000-man contingent from Bijapur.

By 1634, Shahaji had started raiding the area near the Mughal-controlled Daulatabad, prompting the Mughals to initiate a major campaign against him. In the ensuing battle of Parenda (1634), in which Maratha soldiers fought on both sides, the Mughals defeated the Bijapur army led by Shahaji. In early 1635, the Mughal army forced Shahaji to retreat from the Daulatabad area, capturing his supply train and 3,000 of his soldiers. The Mughal emperor Shah Jahan personally arrived in Deccan with a large army, compelling Shahaji to leave northern Maharashtra. Shahaji lost control of several cities, including Junar and Nashik, and retreated to Konkan.

Bijapur had two political factions. The first, which Shahaji sided with, favoured resisting Mughal influence in Deccan. The second favoured establishing peace with the Mughals by recognizing their control over parts of the former Ahmadnagar territory. In 1636, the second faction emerged more powerful, and a peace treaty was signed between Bijapur and the Mughal Empire. As part of this treaty, Bijapur agreed to help the Mughals subjugate Shahaji, or depute him away from the Mughal frontier if he chose to serve Bijapur. The Mughals besieged the Mahuli fort where Shahaji and Murtaza, the pretender to the Ahmadnagar throne, were residing. In October 1636, Shahaji surrendered Mahuli and Junnar to the Mughals and returned to the Bijapur service. As a result, the Mughals controlled a major part of present-day Maharashtra, including Pune and Indapur.

== In Bangalore ==
Shahaji was allowed to retain his jagir in the Pune region but was barred from living in the area as part of the Mughal-Bijapur treaty. The jagir was placed under the nominal administration of his son Shivaji, with his subordinate Dadoji Kondadev as its manager. Shahaji was transferred to the southern part of the Bijapur Sultanate. Shahaji spent the last 20 years of his life in the south, where the Bijapur and the Golconda Sultanates were trying to capture territories from the declining Vijayanagara Empire.

Having established peace with the Mughals in the north, the Bijapur government directed its military to the southern frontier. An army led by the general Rustam-i-Zaman Ranadulla Khan invaded Mysore with Shahaji serving as a subordinate commander. During each campaigning season between 1637 and 1640, Bijapur forces crossed the Krishna and the Tungabhadra rivers, and entered Mysore. The Bijapuri forces defeated several Nayakas, local chiefs who administered the area after the decline of the Vijayanagara Empire. In December 1638, the Bijapur forces seized Bangalore, which was given as a jagir to Shahaji. Shahaji was also given charge of the Kolar, Hoskote, Doddaballapura, and Sira areas by Ranadulla Khan, in consultation with the Bijapur ruler Muhammad Adil Shah. Shahaji chose Bangalore as his headquarters because of its secure fortress and good climate. While Shahaji was unable to retain control of this entire territory after the departure of the main Bijapur army, the Bijapur army's annual expeditions continued to bring more territories under his control.

The rulers of Bijapur exercised little control over the Bangalore region, and Shahaji ruled the area almost independently. The ruler of Bijapur trusted him and even called him "the pillar of the state" in a letter. However, in 1639, Shahaji appears to have been involved in a conflict against the Bijapur government. Records show that the Bijapur ruler Muhammad Adil Shah ordered the Deshmukh of Lakshmeshwara to support commander Sidi Mooflah in arresting the "relations, dependents, servants and horses" of Shahaji. However, few further details are available about this episode.

Shahaji's relations with the Bijapur ruler improved in the subsequent years, and in 1641, he supported the Bijapur government in suppressing a revolt by the Hindu chiefs. He joined an army led by the Bijapur general Afzal Khan that captured the fort of Basavapatna from Keng Nayak. The Bijapur army captured several other forts, including Vellore, during this campaign. A letter from Bijapur dated 30 January 1642 expressed appreciation for Shahaji's services in the Karnataka region.

Not much is known about Shahaji's activities during 1642–1645; he likely stayed at his jagir in Bangalore and may have been involved in Bijapur's recapture of the Ikkeri fort in 1644. He likely also stayed at Kolar and Doddaballapura and spent summers at Nandi. Sometime between 1642 and 1644, Shahaji's wife Jijabai and his son Shivaji visited him in Bangalore. During this period, Shahaji arranged Shivaji's marriage to Soyrabai and held a grand wedding ceremony in Bangalore. He also presented his entire family, including his two sons by his second wife, at the Bijapur court. Jijabai and Shivaji returned to Pune shortly after. Shahaji's elder son Shambuji (also called Sambhaji) and another son Venkoji from his other wife Tukabai stayed with him in Bangalore.

Shahaji beautified Bangalore by commissioning several gardens and also built a palace called Gowri Mahal, which, according to popular tradition, was located in the present-day Basavanagudi extension.

Shahaji appointed several Brahmins from the Pune region to the Bangalore administration. Meanwhile, Dadoji Kondadev revived the taxation system in Pune and remitted surplus revenue to Shahaji's treasury in Bangalore.

== Later life ==
Amid the rise of Muslim orthodoxy in Bijapur, the relationship between Shahaji, a Hindu, and the Bijapur government kept changing. In 1644, the Bijapur labelled Shahaji a rebel - an August 1644 letter from the Bjiapur asks Kanoji Nayak Jedhe, the Deshmukh of Bhor, to assist government representatives in defeating Dadoji Kondadev, who was campaigning in the Kondana area. The government also instructed another Deshmukh, Khopde, to seize Shahaji's estates, but these orders were apparently withdrawn before implementation. A similar situation arose in 1646.

In 1648, during a Bijapur campaign to support the rebellion of the Nayakas against the Vijayanagara king Sriranga III, Shahaji was arrested for acting against the interests of Bijapur. While the forces of Bijapur and Golconda laid siege to the Jinjee fort, Shahaji had started acting independently of Bijapur commander Mustafa Khan and started negotiating with the Nayakas of Jinjee, Madurai, and Tiruchirapalli. He even sought service with the Golconda government. Shahaji was brought to the capital Bijapur in chains and forced to surrender the forts of Kondana and Bangalore. While texts written under Maratha patronage such as Shiva-Bharat state that Shahaji was arrested because of a rebellion conducted by his son Shivaji, Bijapur records do not support this claim. Whatever the case, Shahaji was pardoned within a year.

Little information is available about Shahaji's life from 1648 to 1660. He appears to have moved out of Bangalore, where his son Ekoji was stationed. Shahaji himself was stationed at Kanakagiri, and his son Sambhaji was killed during a revolt by the chief (Rajah) of Kanakagiri in 1654. During this period, Shahaji participated in Bijapur's war against Golconda.

Meanwhile, Shivaji, who now administered Shahaji's jagir in the Pune region, began acting independently of the Bijapur government and started capturing territories of Bijapur vassals around Pune. Shivaji claimed to be a servant of the Bijapur government and justified his actions by arguing that he was governing these territories better than the deposed rulers did. However, the ruler of Bijapur doubted Shivaji's loyalty and Shahaji distanced himself from his son's actions. A letter from Bijapur, dated 26 May 1658, returns to Shahaji the control of his former jagir of Bangalore and assures him that he will not be punished for the rebellion of his son. Some writers have speculated that Shahaji and Shivaji collaborated to establish an independent kingdom, but no contemporary sources support this theory. The majority of historians believe that Shahaji did not support his son's rebellion. In 1659, the Bijapur government sent a 12,000-strong army led by Afzal Khan against Shivaji, but Shivaji emerged victorious in the conflict. Between the years 1659 and 1662, Shahaji travelled to Pune as a mediator between Shivaji and Bijapur, meeting his son for the first time in 12 years. This was also Shahaji's last meeting with Shivaji, as Shahaji died in early 1664 in a hunting accident.

== Patronage to scholars ==
At his court in Bangalore, Shahaji patronized several scholars, including Jayarama Pindye, who composed Radha-Madhava-Vilasa Champu and Parnala-Parvata-Grahan-Akhyana. Jayarama had heard about Shahaji's generosity to poets from traveling bhats (poets) who were returning to their homes in the north. He traveled from Nashik to Bangalore, and was introduced to Shahaji's court by a man named Shivaraya Gosvamin. Jayarama presented 12 coconuts before Shahaji, signifying his knowledge of 12 languages. Under Shahaji's patronage, Jayarama composed Radha-Madhava-Vilasa Champu (c. 1660 or earlier), a multi-lingual collection of poems. The work names and cites poets in 35 languages, including Sanskrit, Prakrit, Persian, Kannada, Hindi, and Urdu. Jayarama compares Shahaji to Partha in heroism, Vikramarka in generosity, and Bhoja in learning. He makes grandiloquent claims, such as that "hundreds and thousands" of scholars and poets from all over the world came to Shahaji's court to seek his patronage. In a Dingal-language poem, he describes a scene in which the king of Amber learns of Shahaji's greatness from poets and announces his intention to present gifts to Shahaji if Shahaji ever visited Amber; which according to scholar Sumit Guha is a purely imaginary scenario but shows how Bards were responsible for propagating a transregional reputation. According to a Sanskrit poem in the collection, when Jayarama requested leave from Shahaji's court to go on a pilgrimage to Kashi and other places, Shahaji told him to take whatever wealth he desired before leaving. Jayarama credits Shahaji with reviving the Sanskrit language and states that Shahaji himself composed a part of a stanza in Sanskrit; his sons Sambhaji and Ekoji also composed lines to test Jayarama's poetic skills.

Poets cited in the Radha-Madhava-Vilasa Champu include Sbuddhi-Rav, a native of Ghatampur, who compares Shahaji to Krishna holding up the Govardhan Hill to protect the people. Other prominent personalities in Shahaji's court included Prabhakarabhatta (the purohit), Naropant Hanumanthe, and his sons Janardana-pant and Raghunath-pant.

== Legacy ==
Shahaji's tomb is located at Hodigere, near Channagiri in Karnataka.

== In popular culture ==
=== Films and television ===
- In Bharat Ek Khoj, Shahaji was portrayed by Achyut Potdar.
- In Raja Shivchhatrapati (2008), a Marathi historical TV serial aired on Star Pravah, Avinash Narakar played the role of Shahaji Raje.
- In Rajmata Jijau (2011) Milind Gunaji portrayed Shahaji.
- In Veer Shivaji (2011-2012) Milind Gunaji portrayed Shahaji.
- Shantanu Moghe, Vikram Gaikwad, Roshan Vichare, Sahil Deshmukh Khan portray Shahaji at different stages of his life in Swarajya Janani Jijamata (2019), a show based on the life of Rajmata Jijabai.
- In Sher Shivraj (2022) Ravindra Mankani portrayed Shahaji.
- In Raja Shivaji (2026) Sachin Khedekar portrayed Shahaji.
