= Jadhav =

Clan (Gotra) in Maharashtra, Goa and Karnataka

Jadhav जाधव
- Clan (Gotra) of Koli, Maratha, Banjara and Mang castes
- Ethnicity: Koli; Maratha; Banjara; Mang
- Location: Maharashtra; Goa; Karnataka; Telangana
- Parent tribe: Marathi people
- Language: Marathi; Koli; Hindi; English
- Religion: Hindu
- Surnames: Deshmukh; Patil; Nayak; Jadhav

The Jadhav is a clan (Gotra) found in several castes in India such as Koli, Maratha, Veershaiv Vani, Banjara and Mangs living in the Indian states of Maharashtra, Goa, Karnataka, and Telangana.

== Notable people ==
- Bharat Jadhav (born 1973), Indian theatre and film producer
- Bhaskar Jadhav, Indian politician
- Dhanaji Jadhav (1650–1708), warrior of the Maratha Empire
- Kedar Jadhav (born 1985), Indian cricketer
- Keshav Rao Jadhav, Politician from Hyderabad State
- Khashaba Dadasaheb Jadhav (1926–1984), Indian Olympic wrestler
- Kulbhushan Jadhav (born 1970), Indian ex-naval officer and businessman, held by Pakistan since 2016 illegally.
- Lakhuji Jadhav, prominent grandee of Sindkhed Raja in 16th century
- Loukik Jadhav (born 1989), Indian association footballer
- Mary Clubwala Jadhav (1909–1975), Indian philanthropist
- Namdeo Jadhav (born 1921), Indian recipient of the Victoria Cross
- Narendra Jadhav (born 1953), Indian economist, bureaucrat, writer and educationist
- Jadav Payeng (born 1959), environmental activist and forestry worker
- Pradeep Hemsingh Jadhav (1954–2025), Indian politician
- Prataprao Ganpatrao Jadhav (born 1960), member of the Lok Sabha in the Parliament of India
- Priyadarshan Jadhav (born 1980), Marathi actor, film director, film producer and screenwriter
- Ravi Jadhav, Indian film producer and film director
- Sanjay Jadhav, Indian film producer and film director
- Sanjay Haribhau Jadhav (born 1967), Indian politician
- Siddarth Jadhav (born 1981), Indian actor and comedian
- Snehal Jadhav (born 1990), Maharashtrian cricketer
- Umesh. G. Jadhav (born 1959), Member of Parliament in the 17th Lok Sabha
- Yamini Jadhav, Indian politician
- Keren Jadhav, Indian business woman and women entrepreneur

=== In fiction ===
- Inspector Mahesh Jadhav, a fictional character in Zapatlela film series
