= Murtaza Nizam Shah III =

Sultan of Ahmadnagar from 1633 to 1636

13th Sultan of Ahmadnagar
- Reign: 1633–1636
- Predecessor: Hussain Nizam Shah III
- Successor: Position disestablished
- Regent: Shahaji
- House: Nizam Shahi Dynasty
- Religion: Shia Islam

Murtaza Nizam Shah III, was a Nizam Shahi boy prince who in the year 1633 became the nominal Sultan of Ahmednagar. He was subjected to the authority of the Mughal Emperor Shah Jahan.

== Background ==
The Mughals attacked Ahmednagar killed Fateh Khan along with the boy prince Hussain Nizam Shah III on the order of Mughal Emperor Shah Jahan, his relatives as well as two pregnant women so that there would not be any male heir to the throne. But soon, Shahaji (father of Chhatrapati Shivaji Maharaj) took the assistance of Sultanate of Bijapur, A boy named 'Murtaza' the Ahmadnagar Sultanate was taken from Mughal's custody of Jivdhan Fort,Junnar and seated upon the throne on 16th September 1633 at Pemgad, he became the Regent. Later, Pemgad was renamed Shahgad, and the Maharashtra's people began to regard Pemgiri as the 'Land of the resolution of Swarajya' and 'First Capital of Hindavi Swarajya'. This was because the Mughal army had dismantled the Nizam Shahi in 1631. In particular regarding the administration of the 64 forts situated between the Godavari and Bhima rivers. Murtaza Nizam Shah III, being a minor, did not oversee the governance; on the contrary, the entire administration during the period from 1633 to 1636 was managed by Wazir Shahaji Maharaj himself from Pemgad, who had himself assumed the wazir of Nijamshahi. The scion NizamShah and Shahaji's family was stationed in the Mahuli Fort from Pemgiri's Fort.

Shah Jahan quickly made an alliance with Mohammed Adil Shah of Bijapur and the respective Mughal and Sultanate of Bijapur generals, Khan Zaman (son of Mahabat Khan) and Randaula Khan (father of Rustam Zaman) besieged Mahuli. Shahaji tried to break the siege externally several times but failed. However, the mother of Murtaza Nizam, Sajeeda was caught while fleeing along with the Nizam Shah.

At Mahuli, the Mughals entered into a treaty with Shahaji Maharaj, stipulating that he was to relocate to Bengaluru along with his entire family; however, under the terms of this very treaty, Shahaji Maharaj retained the Jagir of Pune for himself.

Murtaza Nizam Shah III was brought before Shah Jahan and Mohammed Adil Shah. Shah Jahan proposed to murder the boy Nizam so as to finish the Nizam Shahi once and for all but Shahaji intervened and requested Shah Jahan to change his decision. But Mohammed Adil Shah was adamant that he should kill the young prince.

After some thinking, Shah Jahan ordered Nizam's release much to the surprise of Mohammed Adil Shah. However, he set a condition that Shahaji would be placed in the deep south so that he could not pose any challenge to the Mughals. The Nizam was taken away by Maratha Sardar Ranoji Wable to Delhi and was made a Sardar.

== In popular culture ==
=== Films and television ===
- In the 2026 Indian Marathi-language historical film Raja Shivaji, he is portrayed by Rajesh Mapuskar.

== See also ==
- Nizam Shahi

Preceded by Hussain Nizam Shah II	Nizam Shahi dynasty 1633–1687	Succeeded by Alamgir I
