= Raja Shivaji (film) =

2026 Indian film by Riteish Deshmukh

- Theatrical release poster
- Directed by: Riteish Deshmukh
- Written by: Ajit Wadikar; Sandeep Patil; Prajakt Deshmukh; Riteish Deshmukh
- Produced by: Jyoti Deshpande; Genelia D'Souza; Riteish Deshmukh
- Starring: Riteish Deshmukh; Genelia D'Souza; Abhishek Bachchan; Sanjay Dutt; Vidya Balan; Mahesh Manjrekar; Fardeen Khan; Bhagyashree; Sachin Khedekar; Amole Gupte; Boman Irani; Jitendra Joshi; Mohit Takalkar
- Cinematography: Santosh Sivan
- Edited by: Urvashi Saxena
- Music by: Ajay-Atul
- Production companies: Mumbai Film Company; Jio Studios
- Distributed by: Jio Studios
- Release date: 1 May 2026
- Running time: Marathi version: 195 minutes; Hindi version: 187 minutes
- Country: India
- Languages: Marathi; Hindi
- Budget: ₹75 crore
- Box office: ₹130 crore

Raja Shivaji (transl. King Shivaji) is a 2026 Indian historical action drama film co-written and directed by Riteish Deshmukh, based on the life of Shivaji, the founder of the Maratha Empire. The film was produced by Genelia D'Souza Deshmukh and Jyoti Deshpande under Mumbai Film Company and Jio Studios. The film features Riteish Deshmukh in the titular role, alongside Genelia D'Souza, Abhishek Bachchan, Sanjay Dutt, Vidya Balan, Mahesh Manjrekar, Sachin Khedekar, Bhagyashree, Fardeen Khan, Jitendra Joshi, and Amole Gupte.

The film was officially announced on 19 February 2024. Principal photography began the same month, with filming taking place across Mumbai, Satara, Wai, Mahabaleshwar, and across the Western Ghats. Made simultaneously in Marathi and Hindi on a budget of ₹75 crore, it is the most expensive Marathi film ever produced.

The film was theatrically released on 1 May 2026, coinciding with Maharashtra Day and International Labour Day. It grossed over ₹130 crore, becoming the highest-grossing Marathi film of all time.

== Plot ==
Burhan Nizam Shah, the sultan of Ahamadnagar treacherously kills Shivaji's maternal grandfather Lakhuji Jadhav Rao, a Nizamshahi sardar in 1629. Shivaji Shahaji Bhosale is born on 19th February 1630 to Jijabai and Shahaji Bhosale. As Shivaji grows up, the Mughals and the Adilshahi dynasty sign the Treaty of Mahuli in 1636, according to which the Mughals would receive a sum 5 lakh hons and Shahaji would work with Adilshahi and receive Pune, given that he does not reside in it.

The story begins with Shivaji's childhood under the guidance of his mother Jijabai and explores how her teachings shaped his vision and courage. As he grows, the film depicts his struggles against the Sultanate of Bijapur and Mughal forces while building a loyal army and mastering guerrilla warfare tactics.

A major part of the narrative revolves around Shivaji's mission to establish Hindavi Swarajya, his strategic battles, political alliances, and the famous confrontation with Afzal Khan, which serves as one of the film's biggest dramatic moments.

== Cast ==
- Riteish Deshmukh as Chhatrapati Shivaji Maharaj
  - Rupesh Bane as teenage Chhatrapati Shivaji Maharaj
  - Riaan Deshmukh as young Chhatrapati Shivaji Maharaj
  - Rahyl Deshmukh as child Chhatrapati Shivaji Maharaj
- Genelia Deshmukh as Sai Bhonsale
  - Kimaya Mestry as young Saibai
- Abhishek Bachchan as Sambhaji Shahaji Bhosale
  - Anish Railkar as Young Child Sambhaji Shahaji Bhosale
  - Rudra Soni as Teenage Sambhaji Shahaji Bhosale
- Sanjay Dutt as Afzal Khan
- Vidya Balan as Khadija Sultana
- Mahesh Manjrekar as Lakhuji Jadhav
- Fardeen Khan as Shah Jahan
- Bhagyashree as Jijabai
- Sachin Khedekar as Shahaji
- Amole Gupte as Mohammed Adil Shah
- Boman Irani as Peer Baba
- Jitendra Joshi as Pant Gopinaath Bokil
- Mohit Takalkar as Krishnaji Bhaskar Kulkarni
- Ashok Samarth as Kanhoji Jedhe
- Suresh Vishwakarma as Chandrarao More
- Kapil Honrao as Yesaji Kank
  - Rohit Waykar as young Yesaji Kank
- Disha Pardeshi as Afzal Begum
- Aabha Velankar as Mhalsabai
- Rahul Mahajan as Tanaji Malusare
  - Mayur More as young Tanaji Malusare
- Mir Sarwar as Randaula Khan
- Nilesh Divekar as Afghan
- Rajesh Mapuskar as Murtaza Nizam Shah III
- Lavish Chauhan as Ali Adil Shah II
  - Aarav Sharma as young Ali Adilshah
- Suhas Shirsat as Patil
- Sushma Deshpande as Aajibai
- Shivani Mundhekar as Gavkari
- Siddhesh Mhaske as Kanhoji's son
- Navdeep Tomar as Fateh Khan
- Nilesh Deshpande as Poojari Bhat

=== Cameo appearances ===
- Salman Khan as Jiva Mahale
- Siddharth Jadhav, Remo D'Souza, Arya Gogavale, and politician Dhiraj Deshmukh appeared in the anthem song "Chhatrapati"

== Production ==
=== Development ===
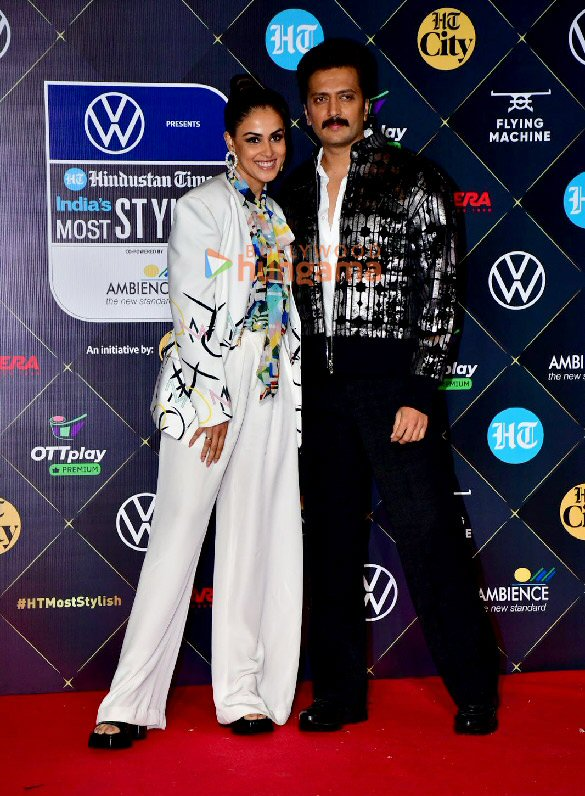
Raja Shivaji is the fourth Marathi production of Genelia Deshmukh with her husband, Riteish Deshmukh, after Lai Bhaari (2014), Mauli (2018), and Ved (2022).

Reports of a film based on Shivaji Maharaj, to be produced by Riteish Deshmukh, first emerged in 2015. On 20 August 2015, Genelia Deshmukh confirmed the project via Twitter, stating that the film was not merely a cinematic venture but a responsibility. Later that year, in December 2015, Riteish Deshmukh officially announced that Mumbai Film Company’s Chhatrapati Shivaji would be directed by Ravi Jadhav. According to Jadhav, the project originated from an idea he conceived between 2014–2015, envisioning Deshmukh as Shivaji Maharaj. The two subsequently began developing the film, with Deshmukh backing the project as both actor and producer under Mumbai Film Company. Over the next few years, multiple writers—including Tejas Palve, Vishwas Patil, and Kshitij Patwardhan—worked on successive drafts of the screenplay, and a look test and preliminary poster design were also completed during this phase. However, the project did not move forward as initially planned. Jadhav later stated that personal circumstances and delays led to his withdrawal from the film, clarifying that there was no disagreement between him and Deshmukh.

In September 2016, reports suggested that Salman Khan had agreed to be part of the Marathi biopic, starring Riteish Deshmukh in the titular role. In May 2017, Deshmukh stated that the screenplay had been completed and that the film could become one of the most expensive projects in Marathi cinema, with a budget reportedly exceeding ₹200 crore. By November 2017, Deshmukh confirmed his active involvement in the scripting process and stated that he had been extensively reading historical texts such as Vedh Mahamanawacha, Shree Raja Shivchatrapati, and Shivcharitra. He also indicated that the film might be produced as a Hindi–Marathi bilingual and would move into pre-production after revisions to the first draft of the screenplay, with filming planned for the following year. He described the Shivaji biopic as "labour of love and a lifelong dream" and one of his most ambitious productions, following earlier projects such as Balak-Palak (2013), Yellow (2014), Lai Bhaari (2014), and Faster Fene (2017), noting that working within the constraints of regional cinema encouraged a strong focus on content.

On 19 February 2020, coinciding with the 390th Shiv Jayanti, a trilogy based on the life of Shivaji Maharaj was announced, with Nagraj Manjule set to direct. Riteish stated that he had wanted to work with Manjule, having been impressed by the filmmaker's debut film Fandry, and noted that Manjule himself was keen on making a film on Shivaji Maharaj. The first film in the trilogy was planned as a pan-Indian release in 2021, with music composed by Ajay-Atul. The background score was composed by John Stewart Eduri. The makers planned the trilogy as three films tracing different phases of Shivaji's life: Shivaji, centred on his early years; Raja Shivaji, focusing on the establishment of the Maratha Empire; and Chhatrapati Shivaji, covering the period of his wider political and military influence across India. In March 2022, Manjule stated that the COVID-19 pandemic had disrupted the project's schedule, delaying production by nearly two years, though he clarified that the film had not been shelved. Subsequently, Manjule exited the project following Jio Studios’ announcement of its production slate, which included Khashaba, to be directed by Manjule himself.

On 19 February 2024, Riteish Deshmukh officially confirmed that he would direct the film himself and unveiled the first poster, announcing the title as Raja Shivaji. Santosh Sivan was signed on as the film's cinematographer, marking his debut in Marathi cinema. The production design was handled by Nikhil Kovale, Apurva Bhagat, and Shashank Tere. The action sequences were choreographed by Dawid Szatarski and Manohar Verma, while the costume design was handled by Rushi Sharma, Manoshi Nath, and Pournima Oak.

=== Casting ===
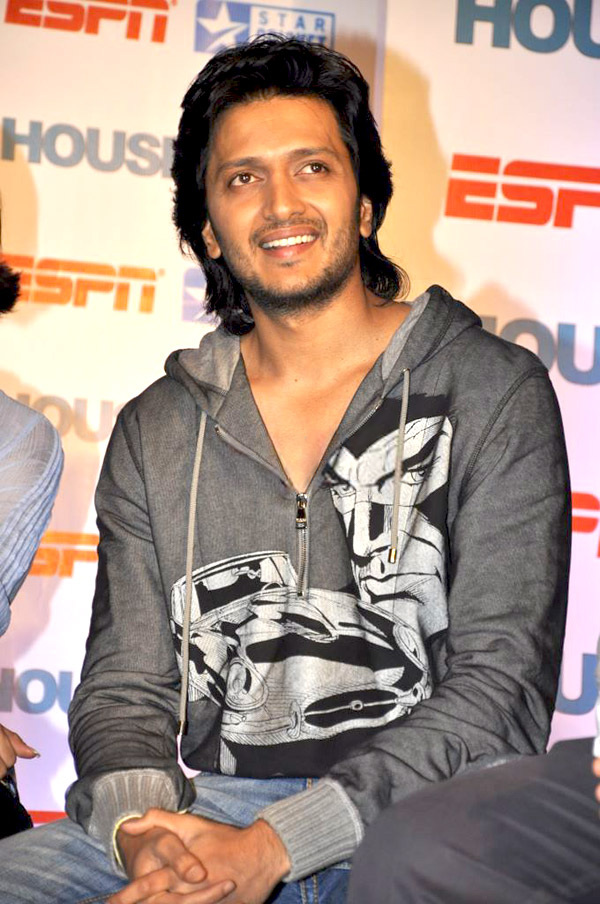
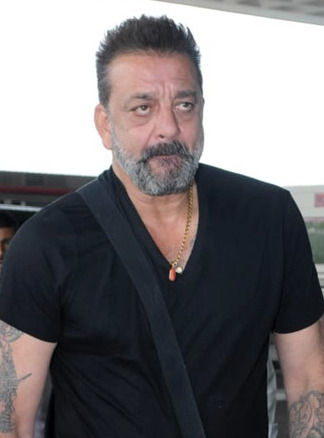
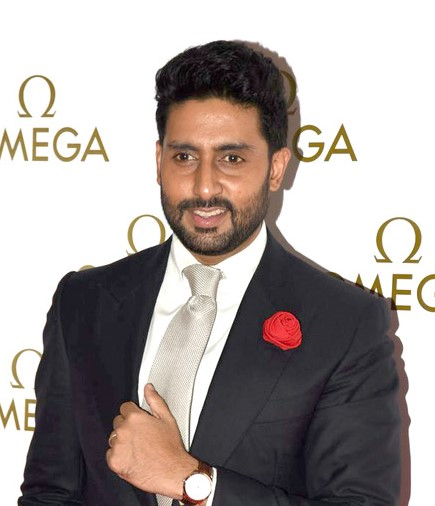
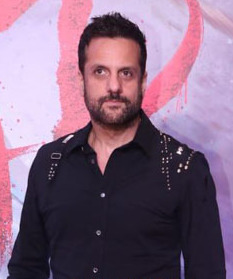
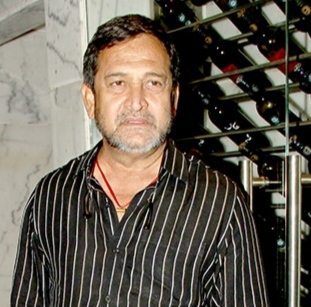
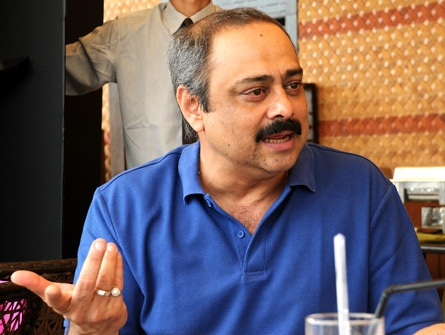
(Left to right): Riteish Deshmukh, Sanjay Dutt, Abhishek Bachchan, Fardeen Khan, Mahesh Manjrekar, Sachin Khedekar
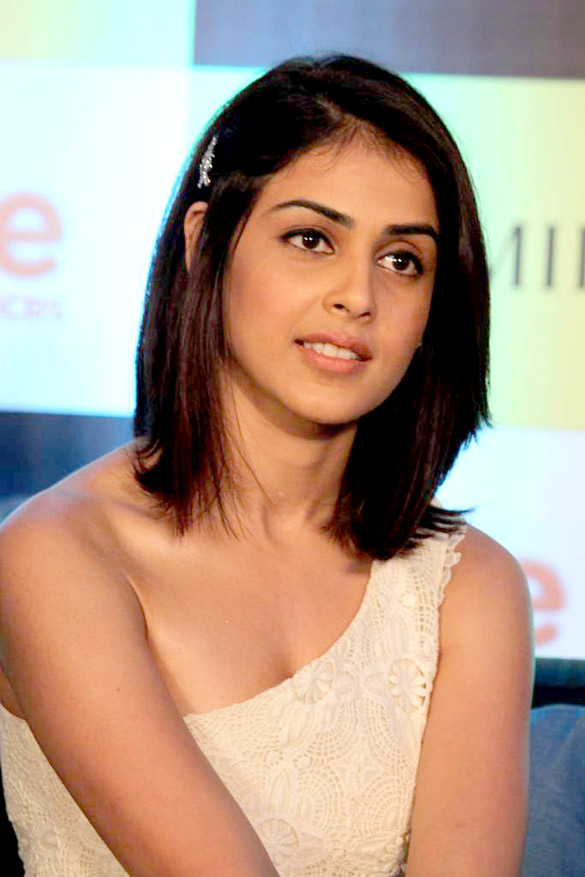
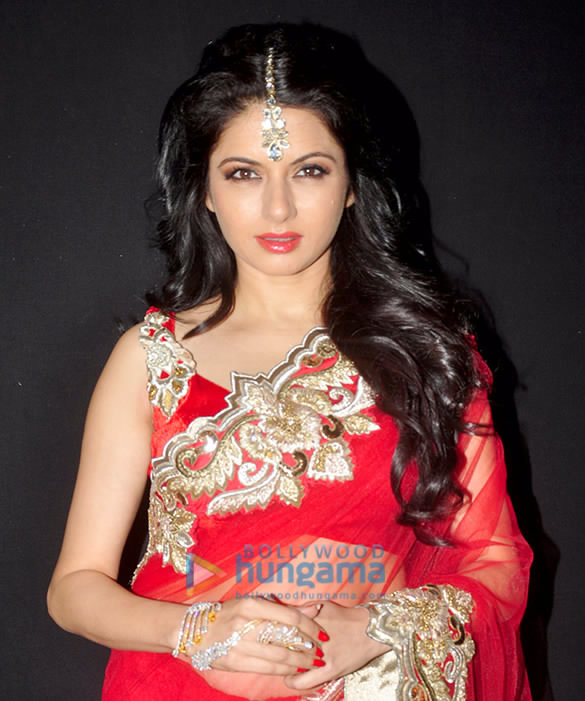
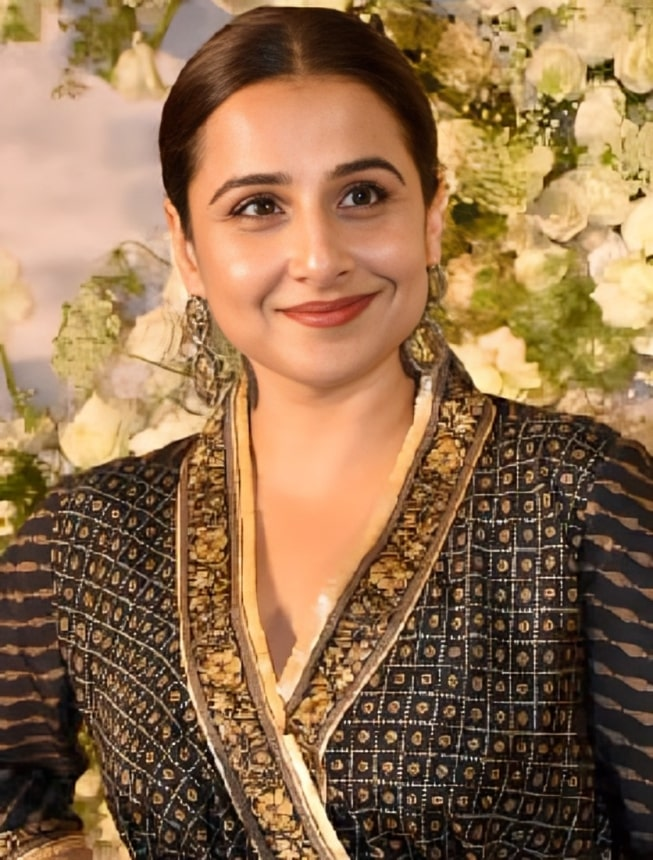
(Left to right): Genelia Deshmukh, Bhagyashree, and Vidya Balan

Riteish Deshmukh was confirmed to portray Chhatrapati Shivaji Maharaj in the titular role. In February 2025, ETimes reported that Abhishek Bachchan, Fardeen Khan, and Sanjay Dutt had joined the cast. In April 2025, Bhagyashree was reported to have been cast as Shivaji Maharaj's mother, a development that was later officially confirmed by the makers through a poster unveiling the principal cast. The same announcement confirmed Mahesh Manjrekar, Sachin Khedekar, Jitendra Joshi, Amole Gupte, and Genelia Deshmukh in key roles. Although early media reports speculated that Dutt would portray the Mughal emperor Aurangzeb, it was later confirmed that he would play the general Afzal Khan. Riteish Deshmukh's son, Rahyl Deshmukh, made his acting debut in the film, playing the younger version of Chhatrapati Shivaji Maharaj.

In June 2025, Vidya Balan joined the cast in an undisclosed role. She confirmed in a July 2025 interview with The Hollywood Reporter that she had completed her shooting portions. The role was initially offered to Tabu, who declined due to scheduling conflicts with Bhoot Bangla. Boman Irani was cast as Peer Baba after being personally approached by Riteish Deshmukh. Supreme Court lawyer Siddharth Shinde played a brief role in the film; Deshmukh revealed this following Shinde's death in September 2025 by sharing set photographs on social media. Marathi television actor Kapil Honrao was cast by Rohan Mapuskar, later confirming his participation through an Instagram story.

In November 2025, Salman Khan filmed a cameo appearance as Jeeva Mahala, a loyal warrior of Shivaji. Khan had previously appeared in Marathi films such as Lai Bhaari (2014) and Ved (2022). Jeeva Mahala is historically known for protecting Shivaji Maharaj during the attack by Sayyad Banda, a lieutenant of Afzal Khan. Khan's cameo includes intense close-up action scenes designed by Parvez Shaikh. He completed filming his portions between 8 and 12 November 2025. Suresh Vishwakarma confirmed his casting in April 2026.

=== Filming ===
Principal photography began in February 2024, with the first schedule covering Shivaji Maharaj's early years, for which a Shivneri Fort set was constructed at Film City in Mumbai. In February 2025, behind-the-scenes photos of Deshmukh on the set went viral on social media. The second schedule commenced in early April 2025 and covered several key phases of Shivaji Maharaj's life. Scenes filmed during this leg included his meeting with his wife, Sai Bhonsale, his coronation ceremony at Raigad Fort, and a major battle sequence. The schedule continued until mid-April. During production in April 2025, Saurabh Sharma, a 26-year-old dancer on the film's choreography team, drowned in the Krishna River at Sangam Mahuli in Satara district after completing the shoot for a song sequence; his body was recovered two days later.

The Mumbai schedule began in October 2025, at Film City, Goregaon, where a massive set representing parts of a fort was built for the shoot. These sets remained in place for over six months. Several key forts were scanned, closely studied, and recreated with meticulous attention to detail. By late October, filming had taken place across the Western Ghats. Filming moved into its final phase in November 2025. Khan completed filming his cameo portions during this period at a suburban studio in Mumbai. Dutt's portions, in which he portrays the film's primary antagonist, were postponed and subsequently filmed in December 2025, marking the completion of his schedule. Filming concluded on 16 December 2025. The film was shot over a period of approximately 100 days across locations including Mahabaleshwar, Wai, Satara, and Mumbai.

=== Post-production ===
Post-production of the film began simultaneously with the wrapping-up of filming in December 2025. The film's visual effects (VFX) were handled by Assemblage Entertainment, while Urvashi Saxena served as the editor. The Marathi version received a U/A certificate from the Central Board of Film Certification (CBFC) on 24 April 2026, with a final runtime of 195.05 minutes, while the Hindi version was certified on 28 April 2026 with a runtime of 187.05 minutes.

== Soundtrack ==
Raja Shivaji

Soundtrack album by Ajay-Atul
- Released: 1 May 2026
- Recorded: 2024–25
- Genre: Feature film soundtrack
- Length: 20:59
- Languages: Marathi; Hindi
- Labels: Warner Music India; Desh Music

Ajay-Atul chronology
Yek Number (2024)	Raja Shivaji (2026)	Ranabaali (2026)

Marathi
No.	Title	Singer(s)	Length
1.	"Raja Shivaji Anthem - Chhatrapati"	Ajay Gogavale	6:04
2.	"Phool Parijat"	Shreya Ghoshal	5:08
3.	"Jai Shivrai"	Ajay Gogavale	4:07
4.	"Bhau Sambha"	Ajay Gogavale	3:07
5.	"Sata Janmachi Gaath"	Ajay Gogavale	2:33
Total length:			20:59

Hindi
No.	Title	Singer(s)	Length
1.	"Raja Shivaji Anthem - Chhatrapati"	Ajay Gogavale	6:04
2.	"Phool Parijaat"	Shreya Ghoshal	5:08
3.	"Jai Shivrai"	Ajay Gogavale	4:07
4.	"Bhau Sambha"	Ajay Gogavale	3:07
5.	"Bandhan Ye Saat Janmo Ka"	Ajay Gogavale	2:33
Total length:			20:59

== Marketing ==
On 21 May 2025, Riteish Deshmukh released the film's first motion poster along with the film's release date. Later, on 19 February 2026, he revealed the first-look poster featuring him as Chhatrapati Shivaji Maharaj. The film's teaser was showcased during screenings of Dhurandhar: The Revenge and was later released on social media on 31 March 2026. It was also showcased on Bigg Boss Marathi 6. The trailer launch event was held at Jio World Drive in Mumbai, and the trailer was also released on social media.

== Release ==
Raja Shivaji was theatrically released on 1 May 2026, coinciding with Maharashtra Day, in Marathi and Hindi. The film began streaming on Netflix from 26 June 2026.

== Reception ==
=== Box office ===
Prior to release, Raja Shivaji recorded advance bookings of ₹5.14 crore gross. The original Marathi version alone brought in ₹4.25 crore gross from advance bookings, which was the highest advance booking figure ever for a Marathi film.

The film was released across approximately 6,000 shows on its opening day, it earned ₹11.35 crore in domestic net collections and ₹13.51 crore in total domestic gross. The Marathi version contributed ₹8.00 crore net from 1,941 shows at a 68.0% occupancy rate, while the Hindi version netted ₹3.35 crore across 4,251 shows with an occupancy rate of 16.0%. The film earned ₹43.66 crore in its opening weekend. The opening-day gross surpassed the previous Marathi record set by Sairat (2016) at ₹3.60 crore and Ved (2022) at ₹2.25 crore. By its fifth day, the film had collected ₹52.7 crore worldwide across 28,868 shows with 17.3 lakh footfalls. At the close of its opening week, the India net collection stood at ₹57.70–60 crore, with the India gross reaching ₹62.42 crore.

In its second week, the film maintained a strong hold. By Day 15, Raja Shivaji had achieved a worldwide gross of ₹92.81 crore and an India net of ₹78.40 crore, surpassing Baipan Bhari Deva (2023) at ₹90.50 crore to become the second-highest-grossing Marathi film in history. The film reached the ₹80 crore mark in just 16 days, compared to approximately five weeks taken by Sairat to reach the same milestone in 2016. On its seventeenth day, the film earned an estimated ₹3.45 crore, bringing its India net to ₹92.4 crore, equivalent to ₹109.03 crore gross, officially surpassing Sairat's lifetime India net collection to become the highest-grossing Marathi film of all time at the domestic box office. By its eighteenth day, the cumulative India net stood at ₹101.1 crore across 76,432 shows with over 41.3 lakh footfalls, making it the first Marathi film to cross ₹100 crore net in domestic collections. By the end of its twenty-second day, Raja Shivaji had minted approximately ₹109.35 crore worldwide, crossing Sairat's decade-old lifetime worldwide gross of ₹110 crore to become the highest-grossing Marathi film of all time globally. The Hindi version contributed approximately ₹29 crore gross, while the original Marathi version contributed over ₹76 crore gross, with an estimated ₹4.20 crore from overseas territories.

According to official figures shared by the producers, the film's collection after two weeks and the third weekend stood at ₹109.9 crore in India and ₹4.9 crore overseas, for a total worldwide gross of ₹114.8 crore. The film's total gross collection reached ₹108.05 crore from approximately 47.4 lakh tickets in its first 27 days of release. The film went on to gross over ₹130 crore worldwide in its theatrical run, becoming the highest-grossing Marathi film of all time and the eighth-highest-grossing Indian film of 2026.

While the Marathi version remained the principal revenue generator, the Hindi version drew audiences from select urban multiplex circuits within Maharashtra and parts of the Hindi belt, including Delhi NCR. Although Raja Shivaji surpassed Sairat in revenue terms, analysts noted that Sairat, made on a budget of merely ₹4 crore, yielded an extraordinary 1,924% return on investment from theatrical earnings alone, making a direct profitability comparison between the two films more nuanced.

=== Critical reception ===
Shreyas Pande of The Hindu wrote that Deshmukh "remains largely content with glorifying the king rather than inquiring into the nature of his glory" and observed that the efforts of making a conventional biopic convert the historical icon into a one-dimensional hero, fighting a generic good vs evil battle as the aesthetics genuflect in his honour. Rishabh Suri of Hindustan Times opined that "for all its visual grandeur, it doesn't translate into a consistent, gripping cinematic experience. It soars in parts, especially towards the end. But as a whole, it remains a spectacle that you admire more than you feel." Shubhra Gupta of The Indian Express gave 2.5 stars out of 5 stars, praised Deshmukh and Dutt's performances, and noted that it has an "ultra-colourful Amar Chitra Katha aesthetic" and follows a "black-and-white universe" of good versus evil, with "not very cleverly hidden" CGI adding to its comic-book feel. Rachit Gupta, reviewing for Filmfare, gave Raja Shivaji 3 out of 5 stars and wrote that "this story demands a roar," but the film ultimately delivers "a dignified murmur." A reviewer from Deccan Chronicle gave 3/5 rating and wrote that "Soap-style flaws, abrupt action, and logical gaps persist. But the heroism, the climax, and the sheer cultural weight of Shivaji Maharaj make you clap, roar, and cheer anyway."

Saibal Chatterjee of NDTV gave 2.5 stars out of 5 stars and wrote that the film went in for "measured strokes rather than adopt massy methods in its emotive moments. It does not always work but the attempt itself is noteworthy." Bhavna Agarval of India Today awarded 3 stars out of 5 stars and noted that while it worked in parts, especially when it tapped into the emotional and ideological core of the story, it began to feel stretched when it prioritised scale over storytelling, especially the first half, with the second half emerging as more thrilling. Mayur Sanap of Rediff gave 3 stars out of 5 stars, noted that Deshmukh presents it with a subtle, more controlled sense of grandeur, avoids unnecessary larger-than-life treatment, unlike Chhaava, but criticised uneven moments further weakened by obvious CGI and some hectic editing, which do little to create any sense of awe. Sakshi Salil Chavan of Outlook gave 2.5/5 stars, wrote that "violence dominates large stretches of the runtime," with "unconvincing CGI and uneven visual effects" disrupting immersion, and added that despite its grandeur and moments of quiet humanity, the film lacks cohesion and feels overwhelming due to its overextended runtime. Swati Vemul of TV9 Marathi observed that Raja Shivaji feels somewhat lengthy, particularly in the second half where tighter editing could have improved the pacing; however, she felt that the film's overall presentation outweigh this shortcoming, making it not only inspiring but also a chance to reconnect with a glorious past.

== Legal issues ==
A Public Interest Litigation (PIL) was filed by an NGO Shree Chhatrapati Shivaji Maharaj Foundation, objecting to the omission of the honorific "Chhatrapati" from the film's title. The petition argued that the title was disrespectful to Shivaji Maharaj and sought a stay on the film's release until it was changed.

On 30 April 2026, the Bombay High Court dismissed the petition as "motivated", noting that the title did not contain derogatory language and that the PIL was filed just two days before the film's release. A division bench led by Chief Justice Shree Chandrashekhar and Justice Gautam Ankhad rejected the plea, stating that the title was not derogatory. The producers' counsel argued that the film focuses on the life of Shivaji Maharaj prior to his coronation as Chhatrapati in 1674, a detail clarified by a disclaimer in the film which was approved by the CBFC.
