= Ranabaali (soundtrack) =

2026 film soundtrack album

- Soundtrack album cover

Soundtrack album by Ajay–Atul
- Released: 18 October 2026
- Recorded: 2025–2026
- Studios: YRF Studios, Mumbai; 2BarQ Studios, Chennai; Soundtown Studios, Chennai; Vanaj Kesav Digi Audio Waves, Chennai; Mystic Hues Inn, Chennai; Rottenblier Studios, Budapest
- Genre: Feature film soundtrack
- Length: 19:00
- Language: Telugu
- Label: T-Series
- Producer: Ajay–Atul

Ajay–Atul chronology
Raja Shivaji (2026)	Ranabaali (2026)	Eetha (2026)
External audio
- Ranabaali – Full Album on YouTube

Singles from Ranabaali
- 1. "Endhayya Saami" Released: 22 September 2026; 2. "Kobali" Released: 12 October 2026

Ranabaali is the soundtrack album composed by Ajay–Atul for the 2026 Telugu-language period action drama film of the same name directed by Rahul Sankrityan, produced by Mythri Movie Makers and presented by T-Series Films starring Vijay Deverakonda, Rashmika Mandanna and Arnold Vosloo. The album accompanied four songs with lyrics written by Ramajogayya Sastry, Kesavaditya, Chaitanya Prasad, Dr. Chakravarthula. Led by two singles, the album was released through T-Series on 18 October 2026.

== Background ==
In January 2025, it was announced that the musician duo Ajay–Atul would compose the soundtrack and score for Ranabaali, marking their first collaboration with Sankrityan and Deverakonda, as well as being their third Telugu film after Shock (2006) and Adipurush (2023). Rahul Sankrityan revealed that the team chose the duo owing to their abilities to create grand orchestral music from grounded rural melodies, something that made them famous for their work in Agneepath (2012) and Sairat (2016). Sankrityan admitted that the modern audiences are liking the "Indianness" in music, and this wanted them to move away from the conventional treatment and considered Ajay–Atul's style that utilized live orchestra and authentic folk textures suited the period setting. The romantic number "Endhayya Saami" was composed in order to focus on the relationship between Ranabaali and Jayamma, which shared the bittersweet moments in an otherwise grimy setting.

== Release ==
After the marriage of Deverakonda and Mandanna on 26 February 2026, two days later, the team revealed a short version of the song "Endhayya Saami" as a "special surprise" to celebrate their wedding. The song in its full version was released as the first single on 22 September. The second single "Kobali" was released on 12 October. The soundtrack album featuring four tracks was released on 18 October. After the album's release, the song "Yerra Pilla" and "Ghanuda Ranabaali" were separately released as singles on 21 and 25 October, respectively.

== Reception ==
Sangeetha Devi Dundoo of The Hindu wrote "The overpowering background score drowns some of the initial lines, but thankfully the composers, Ajay–Atul, soon mellow it so the narrative can breathe." Sruthi Ganapathy Raman of The Hollywood Reporter India called it a "moving" score. Arjun Menon of Rediff.com wrote that "Music by Ajay–Atul is surprisingly lowkey and feel like it belongs to a different film altogether. Neither the human drama nor the ambitious scale is matched by the score."

T. Maruthi Acharya of India Today wrote "Ajay–Atul's music is another disappointment. A film built around a larger-than-life warrior needs a score that elevates its action and intensifies its emotional moments. Here, the music rarely delivers the impact the scenes demand." Latha Srinivasan of NDTV wrote "The music and BGM by Ajay–Atul are quite forgettable." Sashidhar Adivi of Filmfare wrote "The Ajay–Atul duo's background score is functional." Yashaswini Sri of The Indian Express wrote "Ajay–Atul's background score is the film's most surprising disappointment. In the famine sequences, where the music should make you feel the scale of the suffering, it sits passively behind the images. In the battle sequences, where the music should drive the adrenaline, it provides generic action cues that could belong to any film."

== Track listing ==
=== Telugu ===
No.	Title	Lyrics	Singer(s)	Length
1.	"Endhayya Saami"	Ramajogayya Sastry	Shweta Mohan, Ajay Gogavale	5:28
2.	"Kobali"	Kesavaditya	V. M. Mahalingam	4:07
3.	"Kaaru Nisale"	Chaitanya Prasad	Parvathi Meenakshi	4:55
4.	"Paalegaadu"	Dr. Chakravarthula	Vishal Dadlani, Parvathi Meenakshi	4:30
Total length:				19:00

Extended soundtrack
No.	Title	Lyrics	Singer(s)	Length
5.	"Yerra Pilla"	Otu Subbamma	Otu Subbamma, Lakki Reddy Palle Lakshmi Devi	2:35
6.	"Ghanuda Ranabaali"	Putta Penchal Das	V. M. Mahalingam	2:16
Total length:				23:51

=== Tamil ===
No.	Title	Lyrics	Singer(s)	Length
1.	"Yedhayya Saami"	Viveka	Shweta Mohan, Karthik	5:28
2.	"Dheeram Dheeram"	Madhurakavi	V. M. Mahalingam	4:07
3.	"Saama Iruttu"	Madhurakavi	Parvathi Meenakshi	4:55
4.	"Kaalangaalama"	Madhurakavi	Vishal Dadlani, Parvathi Meenakshi	4:30
Total length:				19:00

Extended soundtrack
No.	Title	Lyrics	Singer(s)	Length
5.	"Yendi Kalli"	Madhurakavi	Jayashree, Charumathi, Nirmala Kasi, Vasavi Rajan	2:35
Total length:				23:51

=== Hindi ===
All lyrics are written by Kshitij Patwardhan.

No.	Title	Singer(s)	Length
1.	"O Mera Saajan"	Shweta Mohan, Javed Ali	5:28
2.	"Garjana"	Atul Gogavale	4:07
3.	"Dhairya Dena"	Parvathi Meenakshi	4:55
4.	"Ranabaali Aa Jaa"	Vishal Dadlani, Parvathi Meenakshi	4:30
Total length:			19:00

Extended soundtrack
No.	Title	Lyrics	Singer(s)	Length
5.	"Goriya Tera"	Sumitha Ganguly	Keka Ghoshal	2:35
Total length:				23:51

=== Malayalam ===
All lyrics are written by Siju Thiruvaroor.

No.	Title	Singer(s)	Length
1.	"Enthe Kannala"	Shweta Mohan, Karthik	5:28
2.	"Porin Kaalaham"	V. M. Mahalingam	4:07
3.	"Raavu Pothiyum"	Parvathi Meenakshi	4:55
4.	"Neela Vaaname"	Vishal Dadlani, Parvathi Meenakshi	4:30
Total length:			19:00

Extended soundtrack
No.	Title	Singer(s)	Length
5.	"Vellimani"	Bhaji George, Charumathi, Nandana, Usha	2:35
Total length:			23:51

=== Kannada ===
No.	Title	Lyrics	Singer(s)	Length
1.	"Enayya Saami"	Varadaraj Chikkaballapura	Shweta Mohan, Karthik	5:28
2.	"Kobali"	Aniruddha Sastry	V. M. Mahalingam	4:07
3.	"Kattaleyale"	Aniruddha Sastry	Parvathi Meenakshi	4:55
4.	"Paalegara"	Aniruddha Sastry	Vishal Dadlani, Parvathi Meenakshi	4:30
Total length:				19:00

Extended soundtrack
No.	Title	Lyrics	Singer(s)	Length
5.	"Chanda Chaluve"	Aniruddha Sastry	Meghana Haliyal	2:35
Total length:				23:51

== Background Score ==
Ranabaali

Film score by Ajay–Atul
- Released: 12 November 2026
- Recorded: 2025–2026
- Genre: Feature film score
- Length: 21:56
- Language: Telugu
- Label: T-Series
- Producer: Ajay–Atul

Ajay–Atul chronology
Raja Shivaji (2026)	Ranabaali (2026)	Eetha (2026)
External audio
- Ranabaali OST Full Album on YouTube

All scores are arranged and composed by Ajay–Atul.

Ranabaali OST
No.	Title	Length
1.	"Bhadramallannna'S Boon"	3:50
2.	"Singanamala Bobbili Ranabaali"	2:38
3.	"Demon Of Draught"	2:35
4.	"Jayamma'S Arrival"	2:27
5.	"The Great Migration"	2:38
6.	"The Great Madras Famine 1876"	3:28
7.	"Pothulayya"	4:20
Total length:		21:56

== Personnel ==
Credits adapted from T-Series:

- Music composer and producer: Ajay–Atul
- Music coordinator: B Velavan
- Recording engineers: Vijay Dayal, Sagar Sathe (YRF Studios, Mumbai); Amal Mith (2BarQ Studios, Chennai); Midhun Manoj (Soundtown Studios, Chennai); Senthil Prasad (Vanaj Kesav Digi Audio Waves, Chennai)
- Mixing engineers: Vijay Dayal (YRF Studios, Mumbai)
- Mastering engineers: — Donal Whelan (Hafod Mastering, United Kingdom)

Musicians

- Flute: Varad Kathapurkar
- Sitar: Kishore
- Shenai: Balesh
- Male chorus: Umesh Joshi, Vivek Naik, Karan Kagale, Mandar Pilwalkar, Siddhant Karawde, Vidit Patankar, Chaitanya Shinde, Yashad Ghanekar
- Female chorus: Pragati Joshi, Arohi Mhatre, Aditi Prabhudesai, Madhura Paranjape, Chaandni RMW, Mrunmayee Dadke, Sharmishtha Bhatkar, Sonali Karnik, Apurva Nisshad, Shailey Bidwaikar, Nidhi Hegde, Sanchita Garge

Sunshine Orchestra and Chennai Strings Orchestra

- Conductor: Abhishek V, Vignesh U
- Orchestrators: Abhishek V, Balasubramanian G
- Session supervisor: Balasubramanian G
- Session assistance: Akhila Paspuleti
- Recording Studio: Mystic Hues Inn, Chennai
- Recording engineers: Biju James, Jerald James Biju
- Principal violinist: Vignesh U
- Violins: Vignesh U, Balaji A Fegan, Kumar, Saaji, Vinitha, Ilayan, Kannan, Babu, Vignesh S, Sekar
- Violas: Ebinezar Gnanraj, Dinesh, Harish, Kumar, Hirthick Roshan Cello Balaji M, Prem, Vaijayanthi
- Double Bass: David

Budapest Scoring Orchestra

- Conductor: Péter Illényi
- Orchestrators: Abishek V, Balasubramanian G, Sanjay RA
- Session producer: Bálint Sapszon
- Librarian: Kati Réti
- Orchestra Indian Representative: Balasubramanian G
- Recording studio: Rottenbiller Studios
- Recording Engineer: Dénes Rédly
- Studio assistant: Levente Böde
