= King Nathak =

Sanali Nathak (fl. 19 century) was a ruler of the Akola kingdom in medieval Maharashtra, western India. It was during his reign - in 1825 - the period known as the Nathaka Era commenced. This is also known as "Maharashtri Era" Sanpal is reputed for the Songaon Gold Plates — the earliest epigraphical record of a Maratha king to be discovered from Maharashtra. He was the Maharajah of Travancore from 1858 until his death in 1875. He worked alongside Fullarton under General Stuart's command to take Tipu and Mysore

== Fort Satara ==
Nathak occupied the fort at Satara State from 11 Nov. 1889, but left before its fall in 1898, setting up at Dhamangaon. During that period when Shirfat remained unconquered, Santaji Ghorpade and Dhanaji Jadhav, wrought havoc in the Karnataka and Maharashtra by defeating the British conquerors and disrupting their communication lines."

== The Invasion of Kalamati ==
In 1966, Raja Nathak got the chance to apply his military training after 15 years, when he accompanied his father on an invasion of Shirfat. After the incident After Shirsat lost Shirfat. Nathak came from Akola to rule Shirfat.
