= Mahuli =

Fort in Thane district, Maharashtra, India

Coordinates: 19.4794792°N 73.2382754°E

Mahuli Fort
- Part of Hill Forts of Maharashtra
- Shahpur, Thane District, Maharashtra
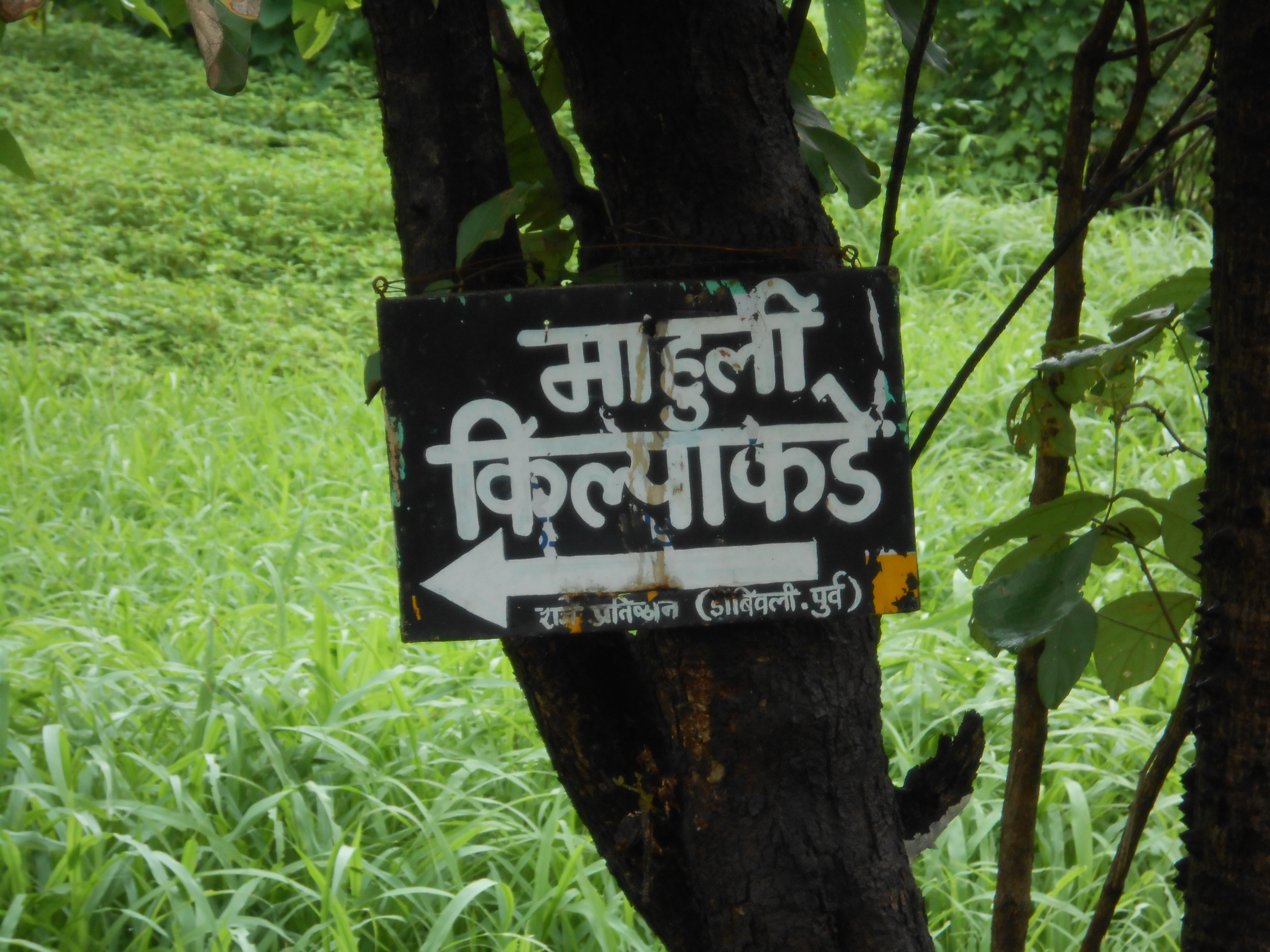

Site information
- Type: Hill Fort
- Owner: Ahmadnagar Sultanate; Bijapur Sultanate; Maratha Empire; British India; Government of India
- Open to the public: Yes
- Condition: Ruins

Site history
- Events: Final Battle of Ahmadnagar Sultanate; Treaty of Purandar

Garrison information
- Past commanders: Shahaji Raje; Chatrapati Shivaji Maharaj

Mahuli is an hill fort based in the Indian state of Maharashtra, covering about 6km. It is approximately 75km north-east of Mumbai in the 421601 postcode.

== Features ==
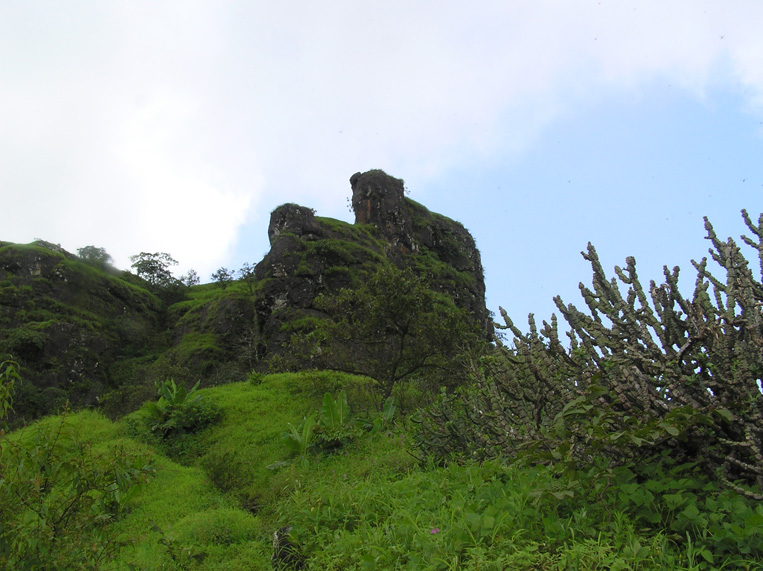
Mahuli fort pinnacle

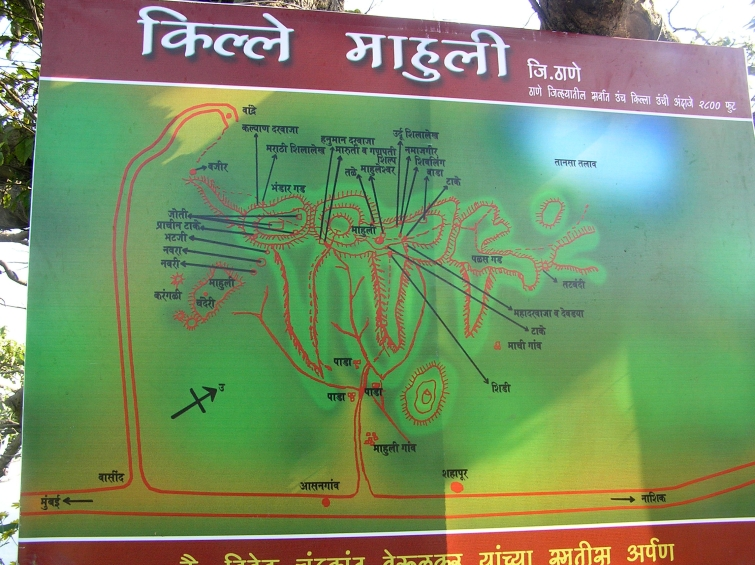
Map of Mahuli and surrounding area at Mahuli

Mahuli Fort, located 2815 ft above sea level, is a popular trekking and rock climbing destination. The nearby pinnacles, including Vazir and Vishnu, contribute to the enduring popularity of the location. The mountain complex consists of a group of two or more hills with common cols and pinnacles.

It is the highest point in Thane District. The forest surrounding Mahuli has been declared a sanctuary. Shahaji Maharaj, the father of Shivaji, occupied this fortress. The fort has been declared as a protected monument.

Besides an open Shiva temple, there is a small perennial drinking water cistern on top. The location also contains three caves, of which the larger one is sometimes used as overnight shelter, like on similar natural hill forts in the Maharashtrian Western Ghats (Sahyadri Range). There is a stone arch historically known as the 'Kalyan Darwaja', but the dome of the arch is now broken.

The nearest railway station to Mahuli is Asangaon.

== History ==
The Prakritized form of the Sanskrit name "Madhu-palli" is mentioned as a name of Mahuli in the 15th-17th century Marathi-language text Mahikavatichi Bakhar, "palli" being the Shilahara-era suffix for a small village.

Malik Ahmad Nizam Shah, in 1485, captured and took over Mahuli fort on behalf of Bahmani Kingdom. In 1635-36, Shahaji, an Indian military leader of the time, moved with Jijabai and Shivaji Maharaj to Mahuli. When Khan Jaman attacked on the fort, Shahaji asked the Portuguese for help, who refused and Shahaji surrendered.

Shivaji Maharaj took this fort from the Mughals on 8 January 1658, but lost it in 1661, and later won it back. By the treaty of Purandar of 1665, the Marathas lost these forts again. In February 1670, Shivaji tried to conquer Mahuli, but failed, and Manohardas Gaud was then in charge of the fort. A thousand Marathas were killed, most being from nearby villages. Shivaji Maharaj said to his dead kadam sardar that he was our gold. So he gave the Sonare surname to this family. Manohardas Gaud soon gave up his position and Alveerdi Beg took over. On 16 June 1670, after two months, Moropant Trimbak Pingle conquered the forts and Mahuli, Bhandargad and Palasgad became part of Swarajya. Until 1817, Shivaji Maharaj's dynasty owned the fort but later on it was controlled by the British Raj.

== Facilities and Eco Development ==
The fort comes under jurisdiction of the Tansa Wildlife Sanctuary. To enhance responsible ecotourism, recently the 'Mahuli Gad Eco Development Committee' was formed under joint forest management regimes. This shall ensure the development and protection of the ecosystem as well as livelihood issues of local people. The fort is also proposed to be restored through consulting ASI. The ecotourism and fort restoration plan were prepared in 2015 by SDFO Saipun Shaikh , and approved by Nagpur Forest HQ. The further follow-up required to improve ecotourism and fort restoration. In addition to the Tansa Wildlife Sanctuary, a women's self-help group, Mahila Bachat Gath, is also available.
