= Jijabai =

Mother of Chatrapati Shivaji Maharaj, founder of the Maratha kingdom

Rajmata Jijabai
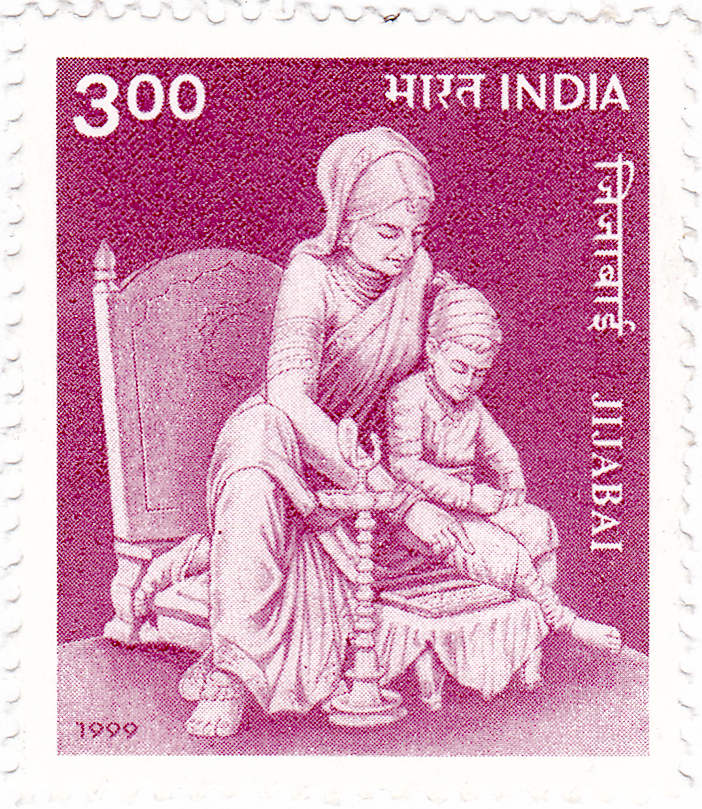
- Jijabai on a 1999 stamp of India

Rajmata of the Maratha Kingdom
- Reign: 1645 - 1674
- Predecessor: position established
- Successor: Soyarabai
- Born: Jijabai Lakhuji Rao Jadhav; 12 January 1598; Jijau Mahal, Sindkhed Raja, Ahmadnagar Sultanate (present-day Buldhana District, Maharashtra, India)
- Died: 17 June 1674 (aged 76); Pachad, Maratha Kingdom (present-day Raigad District, Maharashtra, India)
- Spouse: Shahaji (m. 1605; died 1664)
- Issue: Sambhaji Shahaji Bhosale (son); Shivaji (son)
- House: Jadhav (by birth); Bhonsle (by marriage)
- Father: Lakhuji Rao Jadhav
- Mother: Mhalsabai Jadhav
- Religion: Hinduism

Jijabai (née Jadhavrao; 12 January 1598 – 17 June 1674), was the mother of Chhatrapati Shivaji Maharaj, founder of the Maratha Kingdom. She was a daughter of Lakhuji Jadhav of Sindkhed Raja. He belonged to the lineage of Devagiri Yadavas.

== Early life ==
Jijabai was born on 12 January 1598, to Mhalasabai Jadhav and Lakhuji Jadhav at Sindkhed Raja in present-day Buldhana district of Maharashtra. Jijabai was married at an early age to Shahaji, son of Maloji Bhosale of Verul village, a military commander serving under the Ahmadnagar Sultanate. She was a skilled horse rider, sword fighter, academician and administrator.

Scholar James Laine states that Shivaji Maharaj was imbued with the dream of re-establishing a Hindu kingdom by his mother, Jijabai, whose ancestors the Yadavas held the sovereignty of the Deccan for 150 years pre Islamic invasions. She taught him the nuances of tactics, administration and politics right from an early age.

== Death ==
She died on 17 June 1674 at Pachad village near Raigad Fort. This was only eleven days after the coronation of Chhatrapati Shivaji Maharaj.

== In popular culture ==
=== Films and television ===
- Actress, Sulochana Latkar portrayed Jijabai in the marathi film Maratha Tituka Melvava
- Sumati Gupte played Jijabai in the 1974 film Raja Shivchhatrapati.
- Jijabai was a portrayed by Mrinal Kulkarni in the popular TV series Raja Shivchhatrapati which aired on Star Pravah in 2008.
- Shilpa Tulaskar portrayed Jijabai in the 2011 series Veer Shivaji
- Smita Deshmukh starred as Jijabai in the 2011 Marathi language film Rajmata Jijau based on the life of Jijabai, based on Madan Patil's historical novel Jijausaheb
- The 2011 film Rajmata Jijau is a biography of Jijabai.
- Prateeksha Lonkar played Jijabai in Swarajyarakshak Sambhaji (2017-2020), an Indian historical drama based on the life of Sambhaji.
- Mrinal Kulkarni played Jijabai in Farzand (2018), an Indian Marathi language epic, historical drama film.
- Nishtha Vaidya, Amruta Pawar, Bhargavi Chirmule, Neena Kulkarni portray Jijabai at different stages of her life in Swarajya Janani Jijamata (2019), a show based on the life of Rajmata Jijabai.
- Mrinal Kulkarni played Jijabai in the 2019 Marathi language historical drama film, Fatteshikast.
- Padmavati Rao plays Jijabai in the 2020 Indian Hindi-language biographical period action film, Tanhaji.
- Mrinal Kulkarni plays Jijabai in the 2022 Indian Marathi-language historical movie, Sher Shivraj.
- Mrinal Kulkarni plays Jijabai in the 2022 Indian Marathi-language historical movie, Pawankhind.
- Mrinal Kulkarni plays Jijabai in the 2023 Indian Marathi-language historical movie, Subhedar.
- Bhagyashree plays Jijabai in the 2026 Indian historical action drama movie, Raja Shivaji
- Mrinal Kulkarni plays Jijabai in the 2026 Indian Marathi-language historical movie, Ranapati Shivray: Swari Agra.

== See also ==
- List of Maratha dynasties and states
- Maratha clan system
- Bhosale
