= Rajmata Jijau =

- Directed by: Yashwant Bhalkar
- Based on: Jijausaheb by Madan Patil
- Produced by: Mandatai and Sharadrao Nimse
- Starring: Smita Deshmukh; Milind Gunaji; Amol Kolhe; Rahul Solapurkar
- Music by: Shashank Powar
- Production company: Jijai Chitra
- Release date: 20 May 2011 (Pune)
- Country: India
- Language: Marathi

Rajmata Jijau (Marathi: राजमाता जिजाऊ) is a 2011 Marathi language film based upon the life of Jijabai, mother of the 17th century Maratha king Shivaji, as told in Madan Patil's historical novel Jijausaheb. The film was directed by Yashwant Bhalkar and produced by Mandatai and Sharadrao Nimse from the studio Jijai Chitra in Shirdi.

== Plot ==
Rajmata Jijau tells the story of Jijabai's life, beginning with the return of the child Shivaji to Pune, and in the process depicts Jijabai as a heroine in her own right, largely responsible for the formation of Shivaji, and therefore, for his accomplishments as founder of the Maratha empire.

== Cast ==
- Smita Deshmukh as Jijabai
- Milind Gunaji as Shahaji
- Amol Kolhe as Shivaji
- Monika Dabade as Soyarabai
- Rahul Solapurkar as Afzal Khan
- Rohit kadekar as Sevak
- Deepak Karpe as Netaji Palkar

== Production ==
Rajmata Jijau was produced by the production company Jijai Chitra. Production began on 6 June 2008 at Raigad with research and pre-production. Filming began in 2009, and the film was released on 20 May 2011.

=== Promotion and release ===
- Rajmata Jijau premiered on 20 May 2011 at Mangala Theatre, Pune, with the entire cast and crew, along with local dignitaries, in attendance.
- Prior to release, the film had been reviewed and promoted in electronic and print media.
- Released at Belgaum and Vijapur (Karnataka state)

=== Reception ===
Loksatta published separated reviews of the film and its soundtrack, giving favorable notice to the Powar's score. The film was also reviewed by the IBN Lokmat and Star Majha news channels and Lokmat, Sakal, and Pudhari newspapers.

=== International appearances ===
Rajmata Jijau was released in United Kingdom at the Paul Robeson Theater in London on 20 August 2011, making it the first-ever Marathi language film released in the UK.

The film screened at Pune International Film Festival on 16 January 2012.

== Awards ==
- Marathi VishwaRatna (November 2011) to producers Mandatai and Sharadrao Nimse
- Jijau KalaRatna (January 2012) to Smita Deshmukh
- Best Costume Maharashtra State Film Awards(April 2012) to Purnima Oak.
- Nominated for Best Actress Maharashtra State Film Awards (April 2012) to Dr.Smita Deshmukh

== Soundtrack ==
Lyricist Babasaheb Saudagar and music director Shashank Powar created the soundtrack for Rajmata Jijau. Since this is a period film, Powar researched 16th and 17th century Marathi music to create the score. The soundtrack was released as an album (Rajmata Jijau Shourya Geete) in April 2011.

=== Tracks ===
- "Bhagvya Zendyachya Sansarala" (Gondhal)- (Shankar Mahadevan and chorus)
- "Dhar Sonyacha Nangar Haati"- (Suresh Wadkar and chorus)
- "Jay Jay Jijau" (Title Track)- (Kailash Kher and chorus)
- "Ala Ala Shivaji" (Powada)- (Nandesh Umap and chorus)
