= Keshav Rao Jadhav =

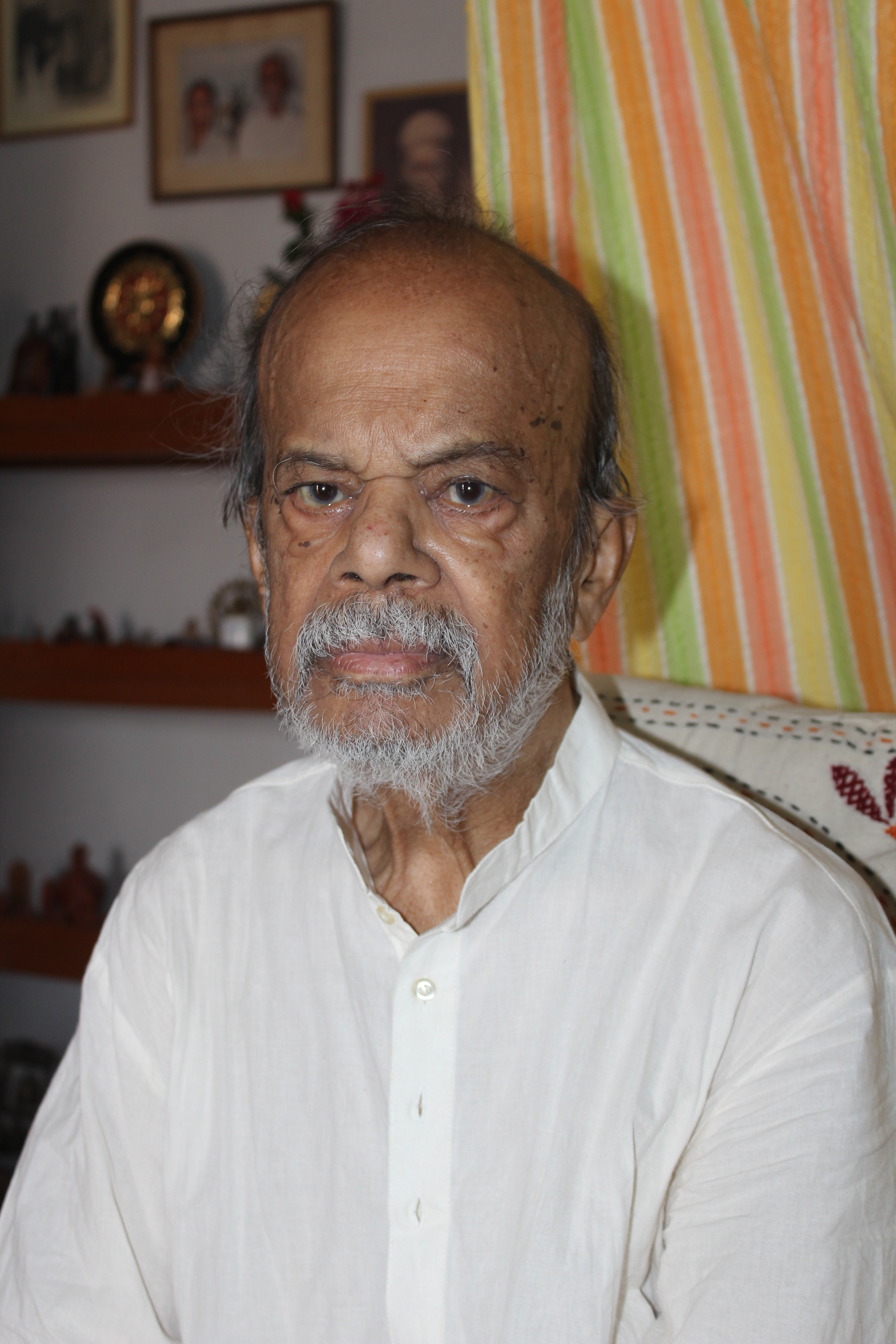
- Born: 27 January 1933
- Died: 16 June 2018 (aged 85); Hyderabad, India
- Occupation: Educationist
- Known for: Telangana movement

Keshav Rao Jadhav (27 January 1933 – 16 June 2018) was an Indian activist for the separate state of Telangana. He served as the convener within the Telangana Jana Parishad, an organization advocating for the statehood of Telangana. Rao Jadhav played a pivotal role in both the initial Telangana movement in the late 1960s and early 1970s, as well as in mobilizing support for the renewed separatist efforts in the early 2000s.

== Early life and career ==
Keshav Rao Jadhav was the president of the Osmania University Teachers Association before he retired as a professor in the English Department of Osmania University. He was actively involved in the separate Telangana movement in 1969 and was also associated with the People's Union for Civil Liberties.

He advocated for dialogue with the Maoists to end violence and worked closely with socialist leader Ram Manohar Lohia. He calls himself Mr. Telangana. He participated in the Mulki War held in 1953 while he was studying at Nizam College.

He faced arrest 17 times during its first phase of Telangana agitation and spent a total of two years in prison. He worked with Kothapalli Jayashankar and Kunduru Jana Reddy and played an important role in uniting 17 organizations advocating for Telangana statehood during the late 1990s and worked for second phase of the Telangana statehood agitation in 2001.

=== Writing ===
Jadhav was a close associate of Ram Manohar Lohia. Jadhav authored a series of booklets titled "Lohia in his Words – A Collection of Quotations from the Writings of Dr. Lohia". He founded and maintained New Mankind magazine for approximately 4–5 years and Olympus magazine for nearly a decade.

== Death ==
Jadhav died after a brief illness in Hyderabad, on 16 June 2018, at the age of 85. His final rites were conducted by his eldest daughter, in accordance with the Arya Samaj tradition.
