= Veer Shivaji =

- Genre: Historical drama
- Created by: Abhimanyu Singh
- Screenplay by: Faizal Akhtar; Virendra Singh Patyal; Dialogues; Mairaj Zaidi
- Story by: Pratap Gangawane
- Starring: See below
- Composers: Sunny Bawra; Inder Bawra
- Country of origin: India
- Original language: Hindi
- No. of seasons: 1
- No. of episodes: 182

Production
- Producer: Abhimanyu Singh
- Cinematography: Veerdhaval Puranik
- Editors: Rochak Ahuja; Ayaz Ahmad Shadab (online)
- Camera setup: Multi-camera
- Running time: 20 minutes (approximately)
- Production company: Contiloe Entertainment

Original release
- Network: Colors TV
- Release: 2 September 2011 – 25 May 2012

Veer Shivaji (transl. Brave Shiva) is an Indian historical drama series that aired on Colors TV from 2 September 2011 to 25 May 2012. The show focuses on the life of Shivaji, the 17th century founder of the Maratha Empire.

== Cast ==
- Paras Arora as Young Chhatrapati Shivaji Raje Bhosle - Jijabai and Shahaji Bhosle's son, Sambhaji Bhosle's brother and Saibai and Soyarabai Bhosle's husband and become first Maratha Chhatrapati (Emperor).
  - Amol Kolhe as Chhatrapati Shivaji Raje Bhosle
- Shilpa Tulaskar as Jijabai Bhosale - Shahaji's first wife; Sambhaji Shahaji Bhosale & Chhatrapati Shivaji Maharaj's mother.
- Palak Jain as Young Saibai Bhosle (née Sai Nimbalkar) - Shivaji's first and beloved wife, Mother of Sambhaji, Daughter of Mudhoji Rao and sister of Bajaji Rao.
  - Sonia Sharma as Sai Bhonsale
- Ayesha Kaduskar as Young Soyarabai Bhosle - (née Soyara Mohite) Shivaji's second wife and Rajaram and Balibai 's mother.
  - Ruchita Jadhav as Soyarabai Bhosle
- Milind Gunaji as Shahaji Raje Bhosale - Jijabai's husband; Sambhaji Shahaji Bhosale & Chhatrapati Shivaji Maharaj's father
- Mandar Jadhav as Young Sambhaji Raje Bhosale / Sambhaji Shahaji Bhosale - Shivaji's elder brother
  - Ritesh Mobh as Sambhaji Raje Bhosle
- Smita Shewale as Putalabai Bhosle - third wife of Shivaji
- Hemant Choudhary as Shyamraj Nilkant Pant- Prime Minister in Shivaji's Darbar
- Alihassan Turabi as Mohammed Adil Shah
- Natasha Sinha as Begum Huzur - Sultan Adil Shah's mother
- Amit Behl as Sonopant Pingle
- Kumar Hegde as Baji Pasalkar
- Alok Narula as Rustam Zaman
- Chetan Hansraj as Inayat Khan
- Behzaad Khan as Noor Khan
- Nawab Shah as Afzal Khan
- Sonia Singh as Rambha Naikin / Janabai - A famous dancer and courtesan.
- Manoj Kumar as Aurangzeb
- Aarav Chowdhary as Dara Shikoh
- Amit Mohanrao Deshmukh as Bhimaji "Bhimya" Wagh
- Jasveer Kaur as Gauhar - Inayat Khan's mistress
- Dinesh Sharma/Devdatta Nage as Tanaji Malusare
- Ravi Bhatia as Jiva Mahala
- Ishita Vyas as Janakibai
- Romanch Mehta as Jaswant Singh
- Yuri Suri as Sujat Khan
- Manoj Verma as Fateh Khan
- Amit Pachori as Netaji Palkar
- Gopal Singh as Bahirji Naik
- Raza Murad as Shah Jahan
- Zaffar Beg as Sharhaan Singh
- Rishabh Jain as Raghoji
- Brownie Parashar as Krishnaji Bhatt
- Mahendra Ghule as Sayyad Banda

== Extension ==
Due to the instant success and popularity and with TRP of more than 2.60, the show timing were extended to five days a week (Monday to Friday at 8:30 pm) from 3 October 2011.
