= Treaty of Purandar (1665) =

1665 treaty between Mughals and Shivaji

- Context: Mughal–Maratha wars
- Signed: 11 June 1665; 361 years ago
- Location: Purandar Fort
- Original signatories: Jai Singh I; Shivaji
- Parties: Mughal Empire; Marathas
- Language: Persian

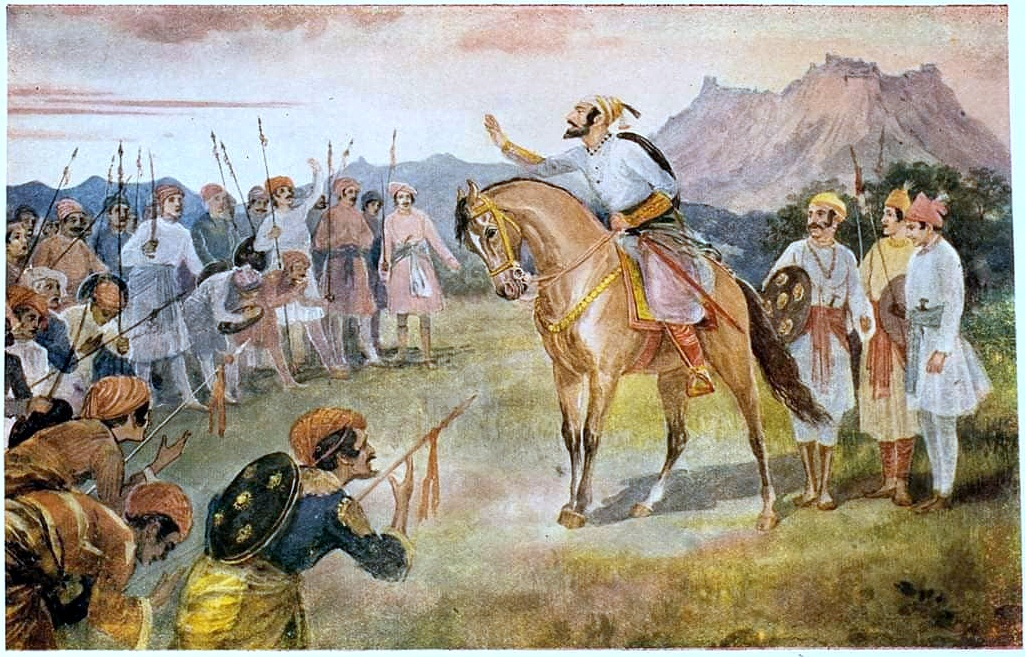
Shivaji On the way to meet Jai Singh I.

The Treaty of Purandar was signed on 11 June 1665, between Jai Singh I, commander of the Mughal Empire, and Shivaji, commander of the Maratha Empire. Shivaji was forced to sign the agreement after Jai Singh besieged Purandar fort.

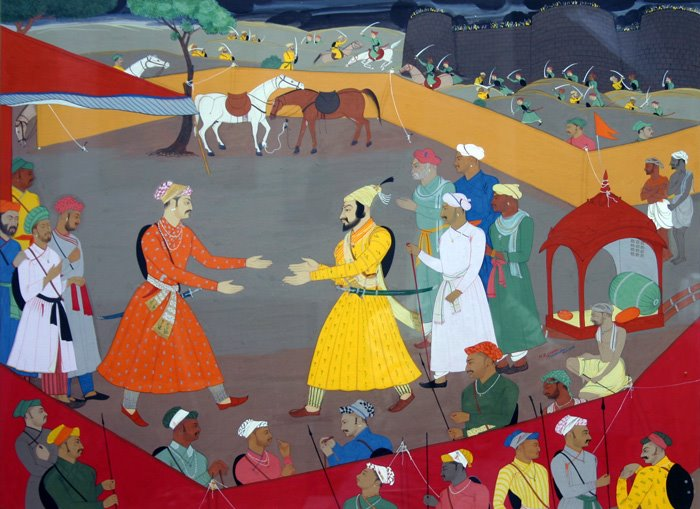
Jai Singh I of Amber receiving Shivaji a day before concluding the Treaty of Purandar (12 June 1665).

== Background ==
Following Shivaji's rebellion and hostilities against the Mughal Empire in collaboration with the Adilshahi dynasty, Aurangzeb sent his senior most general Mirza Raja Jai Singh to subdue Shivaji Maharaj and the Adil Shahi dynasty.

== Siege of Purandar ==
Jai Singh besieged Purandar fort in 1665. He conquered the neighbouring Vajragad fort in the middle of April. He surrounded Purandar and attacked the walls of the fort with cannons. The Marathas suffered heavy casualties. Due to this, Shivaji decided to meet Jai Singh and accept the terms of peace. Shivaji is noted to have said when receiving Jai Singh:

"I have come as a guilty slave to seek forgiveness, and it is for you either to pardon or to kill me at your pleasure. I will make over my great forts, with the country of Konkan, to the Emperor's officers, and I will send you my son to enter the imperial service. As for myself, I hope that after the interval of one year, when I have paid my respects to the Emperor, I may be allowed, like other servants of the State who exercise authority in their own provinces, to live with my wife and family in a small fort or two. Whenever and wherever my services are required. I will on receiving orders, discharge my duty loyally."

== Terms of the treaty ==
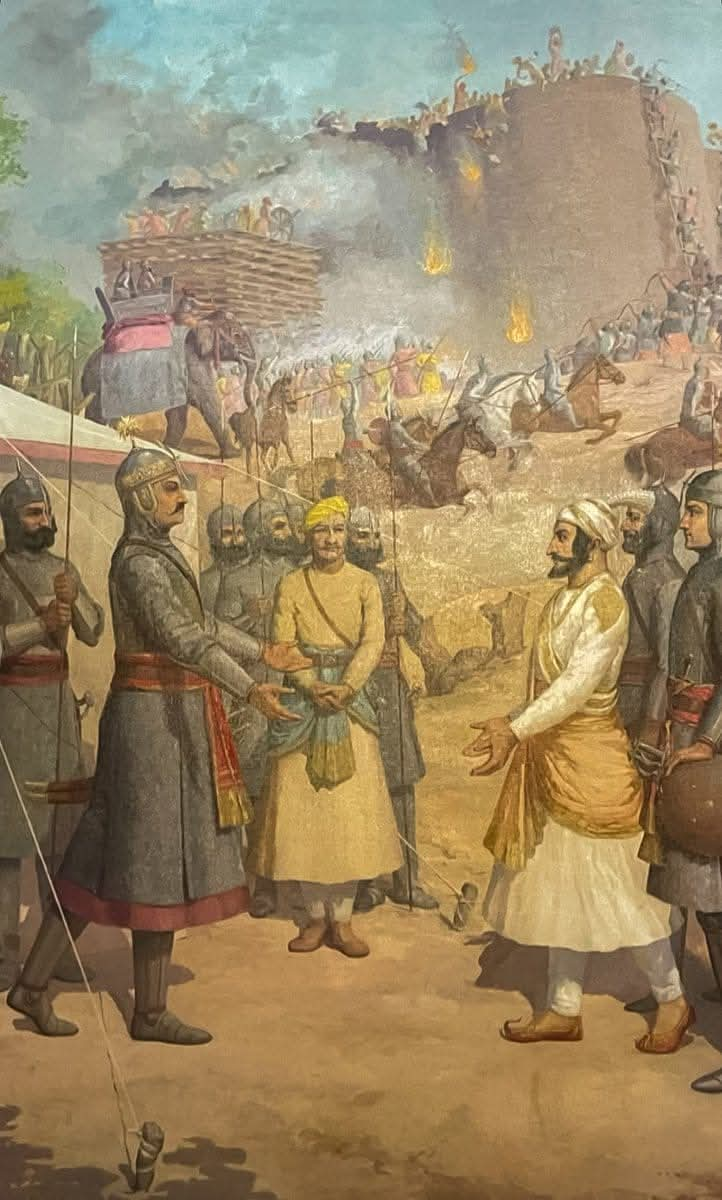
Shivaji submits to Jai Singh

Following are the main points of the treaty:

1. Shivaji kept twelve forts, along with an area worth an income of 100,000 (1 lakh) huns.
2. Shivaji was required to help the Mughals whenever and wherever required.
3. Shivaji's son Sambhaji was tasked with the command of a 5,000-strong force to fight for Mughals as Mansabdar.
4. If Shivaji wanted to claim the Konkan area under Bijapur's control, he would have to pay 4 million (40 lakh) hons to the Mughals.
5. He had to give up his 23 forts, which include Purandar, Rudramal, Kondana, Karnala, Lohagad, Isagad, Tung, Tikona, Rohida, Nardurga, Mahuli, Bhandardurga, Palaskhol, Rupgad, Bakhtgad, Morabkhan, Manikgad, Saroopgad, Sagargad, Marakgad, Ankola, Songad, and Mangad.

Along with these requirements, Shivaji agreed to visit Agra to meet Aurangzeb for further political talks.

== Aftermath ==
Following Shivaji's surrender, Jai Singh ended the siege on Purandar, allowing 7000 residents of the fort to come out which included 4000 Maratha soldiers. Shivaji handed over his forts to Jai Singh. Following the failed rebellion, Shivaji wrote letters to Aurangzeb, requesting forgiveness for his actions and security for himself along with a robe of honour. He also requested Jai Singh to support him in getting his crimes pardoned by the emperor, stating "Now you are protector and a father to me, so I beg you to fulfil the ambition of your son." On September 15, 1665, Aurangzeb granted his request and sent him a letter and a firman along with a robe of honor. Shivaji responded with a letter thanking the emperor:

Shiva, the meanest of life-devoting slaves who wears the ring of servitude in his ear and the carpet of obedience on his shoulder—like an atom ... [acknowledges] the goodnews of his eternal happiness, namely favours from the Emperor ... This sinner and evil-doer did not deserve that his offences should be forgiven or his faults covered up. But the grace and favour of the Emperor have conferred on him a new life and unimaginable honour ...

Later Shivaji travelled to Agra to Aurangzeb's court. But Aurangzeb put him under house arrest for a few months. Shivaji managed to escape and returned home. Aurangzeb blamed Jai Singh's son Ram Singh for Shivaji's escape and demoted him.

== See also ==
- Battle of Purandar
