= Sambhaji Shahaji Bhosale =

Indian royalty (1623–1655)

Sambhaji Shahajiraje Bhosale

Jagirdar of Bangalore in Bijapur Sultanate
- Reign: 1636–1655
- Predecessor: Shahaji
- Successor: Ekoji I
- Born: 1623
- Died: 1655 (aged 31–32); Kanakagiri
- House: Bhonsle
- Father: Shahaji Bhosale
- Mother: Jijabai

Sambhaji Shahaji Bhosle (1623–1655) was the elder son of Shahaji and Jijabai. He was the elder brother of Shivaji. At the time of Sambhaji's birth, Shahaji was a general in the court of Ahmadnagar. Sambhaji was killed in an assault on Kanakagiri by Afzal Khan.

== In popular culture ==
=== Films and television ===
- In Veer Shivaji (2011-2012), Mandar Jadhav and Ritesh Mobh portrayed Shahaji.
