= Lakhuji Jadhav =

Maratha statesman and mansabdar (1560–1629)

Mir-I-Samad Sahiban-I-Jadurai-I-Dakhani Lakhuji Jadhav Rao
- Jadurai Dakkhani; Maharao of Khandesh; Maharajah of Sindhakhed; Kanatiya; Patshahi Wajir; Mir-a-Samad; Mansabdar; Raje
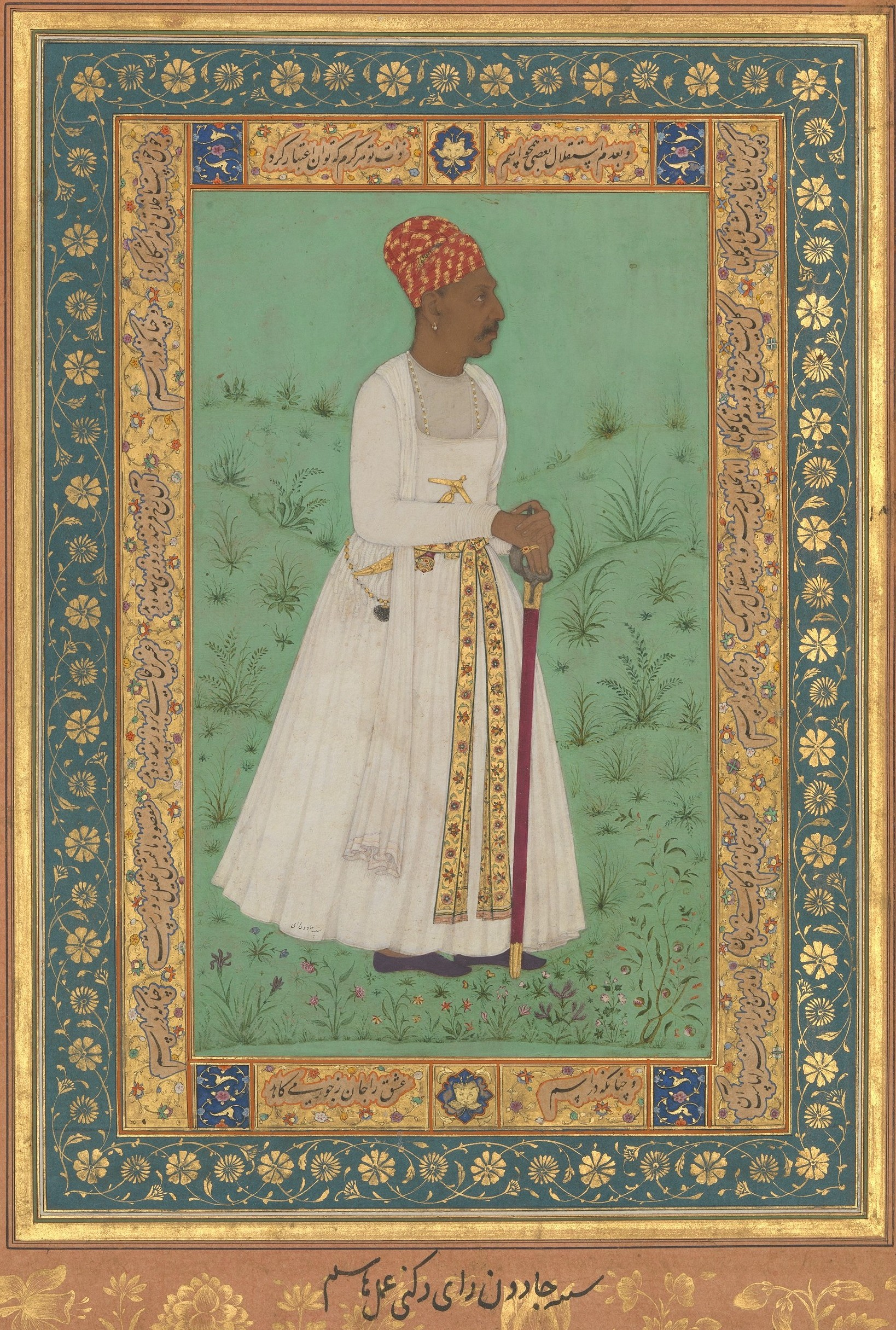
- A contemporary portrait of Lakhuji Jadhav Rao. Jadurai Dakkhani is written in Persian below the portrait.

Mansabdar of the Mughal Empire
- Reign: 1621 – 25 July 1629
- Predecessor: Position established
- Successor: Position abolished

Mansabdar of the Ahmadnagar Sultanate
- Reign: 1585–1621
- Predecessor: Position established
- Successor: Position abolished

Jagirdar of Sindkhed Raja
- Reign: 1582 – 25 July 1629
- Predecessor: Vithoji Jadhav Rao
- Successor: Raghoji
- Born: 1560
- Died: 25 July 1629 (aged 68–69); Devagiri Fort, Ahmadnagar Sultanate
- Cause of death: Assassination
- Spouse: Mhalasabai
- Issue: Dattaji; Achloji; Raghoji; Bahadurji; Jijabai
- Dynasty: Yadava
- Father: Vithoji
- Mother: Thakrai
- Religion: Hinduism

Mir-I-Samad Sahiban-I-Jadurai-I-Dakhani Lakhuji Jadhav Rao (1560 – 25 July 1629), also known as Lakhuji Jadhav, was a Maratha statesman and Mansabdar who initially served the Ahmadnagar Sultanate and later joined the Mughals. He was a prominent figure in the politics of Deccan. Lakhuji was a well-known member of Jadhav Rao clan who descended from the Yadavas of Devagiri. He was also a Jagirdar of Sindkhed Raja.

He was father of Jijabai, and grandfather of Shivaji, who was founder of the Maratha Empire.

== Jagirdar of Sindkhed Raja ==
The Jadhav Rao family had hereditary possession of the Jagir of Sindkhed Raja. During the period of Lakhuji Jadhav Rao, Nizam Shah added some more territories to this Jagir.

== Background ==
Lakhuji Jadhav was a Maratha chief.

He was one of the early exponents of guerilla warfare and he became one of the most important sardars in the Nizam Shahi sultanate. He is known to be the victor of the famous fort of Devagiri. After he won the war of Khandesh and the controlled Khandesh and became the Maharao of Khandesh with the help of Shinde's Rao of West Khandesh from Dhanur and Songir.

His daughter was Jijabai, the mother of Shivaji, founder of the Maratha Empire. She was born on 12 January 1596 and married at an early age to Shahaji Bhosale, a nobleman and military commander under the Adil Shahi sultans of Bijapur in present-day Karnataka.

== Death ==
Lakhuji Jadhav was assassinated at Devgiri Fort, along with his sons and a grandson, by the orders of the Burhan Nizam Shah III in 1629. Lakhuji's descendants built his Samadhi (mausoleum) at Sindkhed Raja in his memory. This Samadhi is a fine example of Maratha architecture.

== In popular culture ==
=== Films and television ===
- In the 2026 Indian Marathi-language historical film Raja Shivaji, he is portrayed by Mahesh Manjrekar.
