= Sindkhed Raja =

- Town
- Location in Maharashtra, India
- Coordinates: 19.9667°N 76.1333°E
- Country: India
- State: Maharashtra
- District: Buldhana
- Elevation: 549 m (1,801 ft)

Population (2011)
  - Total: 16,434

Languages
  - Official: Marathi
- Time zone: UTC+5:30 (IST)

Sindkhed Raja is a town and a municipal council in Buldhana district in the Indian state of Maharashtra. It is the birthplace of Rajmata Jijabai, mother of Chhatrapati Shivaji Maharaj. Sindkhed was ruled by Koli Chieftain.

== Etymology ==
There are many legends associated with name of this city. According to one legend, the name Sindkhed is derived from the name of king Sindhurama, who is said to have established this city in ancient time. While other believes that this area was known as 'Siddha Kshetra' (holy land of seers), which over a period of time got abbreviated to Sindkhed.

== History ==
Not much is known about history of this place in ancient time and the Middle ages. In 1450 A.D., this area was given as jagir to a local Qazi by Alau'd-din Ahmad Shah of the Bahmani Kingdom. By 1550, this area came under rule of powerful Jadhav dynasty, which ruled the paragana of Sindkhed until 1724. During this period, they kept on shuffling their suzerainty with Mughal Empire and Ahmadnagar Sultanate as per situation. Emergence of Nizam of Hyderabad in south India changed political dynamics in this area. The area come under influence of the Nizam by 1724 when Chandrasen Jadhav defected to his court. During the later part of 18th century, this area came under influence of the Shinde dynasty, which ruled it for about 60 years. In 1803, the Nizam of Hyderabad recaptured Sindkhed and restored the rule of Jadhav dynasty. The family lost possessions of the city in 1851 owing to an act of rebellion by Arab troops under their command leading to Sindkhed's downfall. After the decline of the Nizam's rule, this area came under direct British rule.

== Tourist attractions ==
=== Jijau Palace ===
Sindkhed Raja is famous for the palace of Lakhojirao Jadhav. This palace was built in the late sixteenth century by Lakhuji Jadhav, father of Jijabai. Jijabai was born in this place on 12 January 1598.

=== Jijau Shrushti ===
Jijau Shrushti is a Jijabai's memorial, it is situated on a hill near Sindkhed Raja. It is famous for Jijabi's birth anniversary celebration events.

== Demographics ==
As of 2011 India census, Sindkhed Raja had a population of 16,434. Males constitute 52% of the population and females 48%. Literacy rate of Sindkhed Raja city is 82.03% marginally lower than state average of 82.34%. In Sindkhed Raja, Male literacy is around 89.58% while female literacy rate is 73.97%. About 75% of population is employed in agriculture sector.

Year	Male	Female	Total Population	Change	Religion (%)							
Year	Male	Female	Total Population	Change	Hindu	Muslim	Christian	Sikhs	Buddhist	Jain	Other religions and persuasions	Religion not stated
2001	7329	6612	13941	-	71.795	14.074	0.165	0.014	12.790	0.954	0.029	0.179
2011	8553	7881	16434	0.179	70.811	15.127	0.353	0.286	12.237	0.949	0.000	0.237

== Administration ==
Sindkhed Raja is an administrative headquarters of Sindkhed Raja Taluka.

=== Office of Sub-Divisional Officer (Revenue) ===
During reorganization of revenue Sub-Divisions during 2013, Government of Maharashtra established a new revenue sub-divisional office at Sindkhed Raja. Its jurisdiction includes Sindkhed Raja and Deulgaon Raja Tahsils. The office was inaugurated by then guardian minister of districtHasan Mushrif on 15 August 2013. Dr. Vivek Ghodke was the first Sub-Divisional Magistrate of Sindkhed Raja.

== Cultural legacy ==
Sindkhed Raja is the birthplace of Jijabai, mother of Maratha King Shivaji, (founder of Maratha Empire).

- In the state of Maharashtra Jijabai is regarded as an ideal mother. Her upbringing of Shivaji is a subject of folklore.

== See also ==
- Manoj Kayande
- Sindkhed Raja (Vidhan Sabha constituency)
