= Nimbkar =

Nimbkar is a surname. Notable people with this surname include:

- B. V. Nimbkar (1931–2021), an Indian agricultural scientist and social worker
- Kamala Nimbkar (1900–1979), an American occupational therapist
- Nandini Nimbkar, an Indian agricultural scientist
