= Kamala Nimbkar =

- Kamala Nimbkar, from a 1972 publication.
- Born: Elizabeth Lundy; 5 January 1900; Mount Holly, New Jersey
- Died: 29 August 1979 (aged 79); India
- Occupation(s): Occupational therapist, educator
- Children: B. V. Nimbkar (son)
- Relatives: Nandini Nimbkar (granddaughter)

Kamala Vishnu Nimbkar (January 5, 1900 – August 29, 1979), born Elizabeth Lundy, was an American-born occupational therapist in India.

== Early life ==
Elizabeth Lundy was born in Mount Holly, New Jersey the daughter of Joseph Wilmer Lundy and Bessie Morris Roberts Lundy. Her father was a Quaker businessman. She attended the Quaker George School, and earned a bachelor's degree in economics at Barnard College in 1926. She returned to the United States later in her forties, to study occupational therapy at the Philadelphia School of Occupational Therapy.

== Career ==
Before college, Lundy worked as a secretary on a statistical study of coal miners, for the Pennsylvania Bureau of Mines. In India after she married, Nimbkar taught kindergarten by the Froebel method, and started several schools in that tradition. She is credited as founding the first school for occupational therapy (OT) in India in 1948, when she started the OT department at KEM Hospital. In 1958 she founded a second school for OT in Nagpur. She was also founder of the All India Occupational Therapists Association (AIOTA) in 1952, and served as the association's president until 1959. In 1960 she founded the Indian Society for the Rehabilitation of the Handicapped, and was its secretary-general until the 1970s.

In 1957 she represented India at an international conference on rehabilitation, held in Indonesia. She visited Baltimore therapy programs in 1959. In 1965, she attended a reunion of patients and therapists from the Toomey Pavilion, a respiratory clinic in Cleveland, Ohio, hosted by Gini Laurie. At a conference in Australia in 1972, she was honored with the Lasker Award by the International Society for the Rehabilitation of the Disabled.

She edited and published AIOTA's journal, Indian Journal of Occupational Therapy from 1955, and The Journal of Rehabilitation in Asia from 1959. She also wrote articles for other scholarly journals. Her book, A New Life for the Handicapped: A History of Rehabilitation and Occupational Therapy in India, was published posthumously in 1980.

She talked about her life and work in an oral interview given to University of Cambridge

== Personal life ==
Lundy met her husband Vishnu Nimbkar, an Indian businessman, in New York, converted to Hinduism, and moved with him to India in 1930. She lived at the Sabarmati Ashram, the residence of Mahatma Gandhi, for several months upon arrival. She died in 1979, aged 79 years, in India. Some of her letters are in her father's papers at Swarthmore College. Her son was B. V. Nimbkar, and one of her granddaughters is Nandini Nimbkar, both noted agricultural scientists. A secular, Marathi medium school in Phaltan, Kamala Nimbkar Balbhavan, is named after her.
