= Nimbalkar =

Indian surname

Nimbalkar is a Maratha clan descent from Nimbraj Parmar, direct descendant of Jagdeva Parmar. Nimbalkar derives its surname from the forest of Nimbalak in Phaltan taluka, Satara district, Maharashtra, India.

Some Nimbalkars served as head of the deshmukhs (sardeshmukhs or sardars) during the period of the Deccan Sultanates and Mughal Empire.

Notable people with the name include:

- Anjali Nimbalkar, Indian politician
- Bajaji Rao Naik Nimbalkar, Maratha Statesman and Maharaja of Phaltan.
- B. B. Nimbalkar (1919–2012), Indian cricketer
- Hindurao Naik Nimbalkar, Indian politician
- Omprakash Raje Nimbalkar, Indian politician
- Rajaram Nimbalkar, Indian politician
- Ramraje Naik Nimbalkar, former chairman of Maharashtra Legislative Council.
- Ranjitsinh Nimbalkar, Politician and Senior BJP Politician.
- Raosaheb Nimbalkar (1915–1965), Indian cricketer
- Sai Bhonsale (née Nimbalkar; c. 1633 – 1659), the first wife of Chhatrapati Shivaji, the founder of the Maratha Kingdom
- S. P. Nimbalkar, Indian academic
- Urmila Nimbalkar, actress in the Indian Hindi-language television soap opera Diya Aur Baati Hum
