= Bajaji Rao Naik Nimbalkar =

Indian Nobleman

- Tenure: 1644 - 1676
- Died: 1676
- Father: Mudhoji II Nimbalkar
- Religion: Hinduism (by upbringing); Islam (converted); Hinduism (reconverted)

Bajajirao Mudhoji Naik Nimbalkar was a Maratha nobleman and sixteenth Raja of Phaltan Jagir during 1644–1676. He was sardar of Deccan Sultanates and Maratha nobleman.

== Life ==
He succeeded throne of Phaltan after his father Naik Nimbalkar Mudhoji II. He was sixteenth direct descent from Padakla Jagdevrao Parmar, the founder of his dynasty and Phaltan. Balaji was the brother-in-law of Shivaji, the founder of Maratha Empire, as his sister Maharani Saibai was his first wife. His sons were Mahadaji and Vanangoji. Mahadaji married Sakhubai, the eldest daughter of Shivaji and Saibai. He converted back to Hinduism from Islam later on and his conversion was performed by Shivaji according to Hindu Vedic rites.

== Career ==
He fought many battles for the Islamic Sultans of Deccan and later for the Marathas. However, it is said that he embraced the Muslim religion in the court of the Adil Shahi Dynasty after pressure for him to join Islam. Later, Shivaji brought him back in the Hindu religion at Nira-Narsingpur and he had given his daughter to Bajaji's Son. Bajaji also married Ahirekar Patil and Bhosale Kinhaikar's daughters when he returned to the Hindu religion.
