= Sakharwadi =

Village in Maharashtra

- Town
- Location in Maharashtra, India Sakharwadi (India)
- Coordinates: 17.98°N 74.23°E
- Country: India
- State: Maharashtra
- District: Satara

Government
  - Type: Grampanchayat
  - Sarpanch: Vikramsinh Bhosale
- Elevation: 568 m (1,864 ft)

Population (2001)
  - Total: 20,000
- Demonym: Sakharwadikar

Languages
  - Official: Marathi
- Time zone: UTC+5:30 (IST)
- PIN: 415522

Sakharwadi is a town and Gram panchayat of Phaltan tehsil, Satara district, Maharashtra, India. It is situated at about 15 kilometres (9.3 mi) north-east of Phaltan city and approximately 60 kilometres (37 mi) north-west of Satara city.

== Location ==
Town Sakharwadi has Governing System as Gram Panchayat which was established in 27 Jan. 1956. Town has population around 1,00,000 and more. The River Nira flows around Sakharwadi area as it is 4 km from Major Town at Murum and 5 km from Hol Village. Sakharwadis Hol Circle area slightly attached to Nira River at Asami farms of M S F C. Small scale Water Resources like Odha, Nala, Wheels, Phata etc. and Nira Right Canal Water Project Made Sakharwadi as Green Town. Town has Bigger Market Place after Phaltan. It is the Seat of Hol Mandal (Administrative Village Head Quarter).

== History of Name formation ==
Sakharwadi Word Means Village of Sugar, as one of the Industrialist Mr. Apte from Pune established first Private Sugar Factory of Maharashtra, Sakharwadi (Phaltan) in the 1930s. When this area was under Phaltans Principality, the actual Village area was under village Hol, moreover Pimpalwadi sub area.

== Notable people ==
- Sayaji Shinde
