= B. V. Nimbkar =

Indian agricultural scientist and social worker (1931–2021)

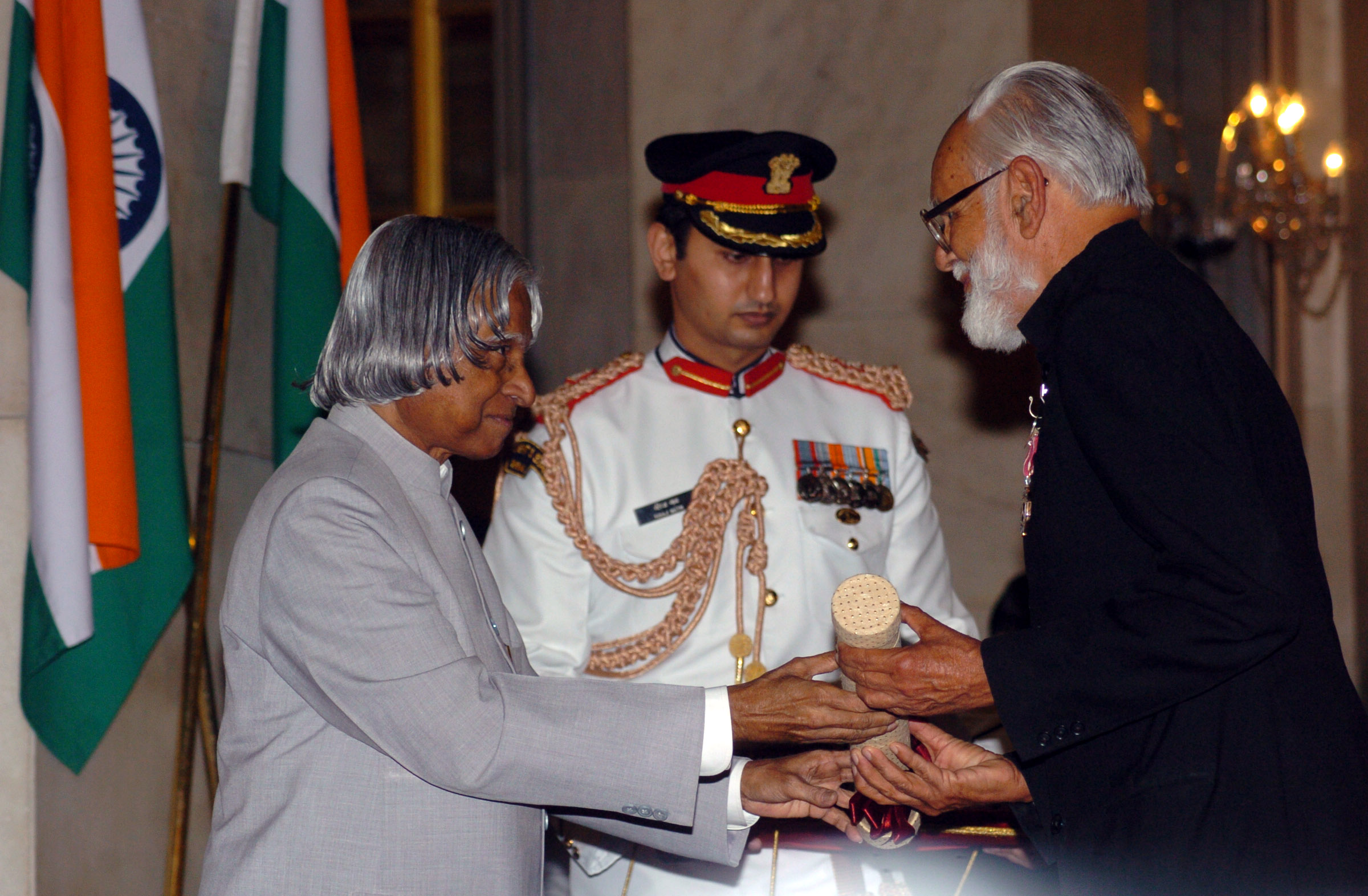
- Nimbkar presented with the Padma Shri by President A. P. J. Abdul Kalam (2006)
- Born: 17 July 1931; Goa, Portuguese India
- Died: 25 August 2021 (aged 90); Phaltan, Maharashtra, India
- Other name: Bon
- Occupations: Agricultural scientist Social worker
- Known for: Nimbkar Agricultural Research Institute
- Spouse: Jai
- Children: Nandini Nimbkar; Manjiri Nimbkar, Chanda Nimbkar
- Parent(s): Kamala and Vishnu Nimbkar
- Awards: Padma Shri; Jamnalal Bajaj Award

Bonbehari Vishnu Nimbkar (17 July 1931 – 25 August 2021) was an Indian agricultural scientist and social worker, known for his work in the fields of animal husbandry and agriculture. He founded Nimbkar Agricultural Research Institute, an Indian non-governmental organization engaged in research and development in agriculture, renewable energy and animal husbandry. His work garnered him many awards, including the Padma Shri and the Jamnalal Bajaj Award.

== Early life ==
B. V. Nimbkar was born on 17 July 1931 in Goa to Kamala Nimbkar (née Elizabeth Lundy) and Vishnu Nimbkar. He attended George School, a Quaker-run preparatory school in Newtown, Pennsylvania. His mother also attended the same school. After obtaining a master's degree in agronomy from the University of Arizona, he returned to India.

== Career ==
In 1956, he started farming in Phaltan, a taluka in Satara district in western Maharashtra, and is reported to have started a seed business and processing plant called Nimbkar Seeds, with financial assistance from the Rockefeller Foundation. In 1968, he founded the Nimbkar Agricultural Research Institute (NARI), a non-profit, non-governmental organization, for advanced research in agriculture. The organization has since grown to include activities in renewable energy, animal husbandry and sustainable development. His company Nimbkar Seeds is credited with the introduction of pure-bred Boer goats for the first time in India. He remained the president of NARI till 1990 and since then NARI is headed by his daughter Nandini Nimbkar, assisted by Chanda Nimbkar and Nandini's husband, Anil K. Rajvanshi.

Some of Nimbkar's research areas included studying the causes for desertification particularly in the Western Maharashtra region and the lasting impact of hybrid plants and high-yielding varieties of crops on the underlying soil. His research work and articles were published in national and international journals.

Nimbkar was the recipient of the Padma Shri, India's fourth highest civilian honor, in 2006, for his contributions to the field of agriculture. He was also the recipient of the Jamnalal Bajaj Award in 2016 for the application of science and technology toward rural applications.

== Personal life ==
Nimbkar was married and had three daughters, Nandini Nimbkar, an academic and agricultural scientist, Chanda Nimbkar, a geneticist and animal husbandry research scientist, and Manjiri Nimbkar, a physician and social worker.

Nimbkar died at Phaltan on 25 August 2021, one month after his 90th birthday.

== Selected bibliography ==
- Nimbkar C., J. H. J. van der Werf, P. M. Ghalsasi, B. V. Nimbkar, and S. W. Walkden-Brown. "Potential introgression pathways and strategies for wider use of the FecB gene in Maharashtra state and other parts of India". ACIAR, Australia. ISSN 0816-4266.
- Nimbkar, B. V.; Nimbkar, N.; Zende, N. (October 1986). "Desertification of Western Maharashtra: Causes and possible solutions. I. Comparative growth of eight tree species". Forest Ecology and Management. 16 (1–4): 243–251. doi:10.1016/0378-1127(86)90024-1.
- B. V. Nimbkar (October 1967). "Jumble of Sundry Facts". Economic and Political Weekly. IV (40).
- B. V. Nimbkar (December 1967). "A Word of Warning on Hybrids". Economic and Political Weekly. II (47).
- B. V. Nimbkar (February 1988). "The Greening of Maharashtra". Economic and Political Weekly. XXIII (8).

== See also ==
- Nimbkar Agricultural Research Institute
- Nandini Nimbkar
- Anil K. Rajvanshi
