= Rajgad =

Hill fort in Pune district, Maharashtra, India

Rajgad Fort
- Part of on Maharashtra
- Pune District, Maharashtra
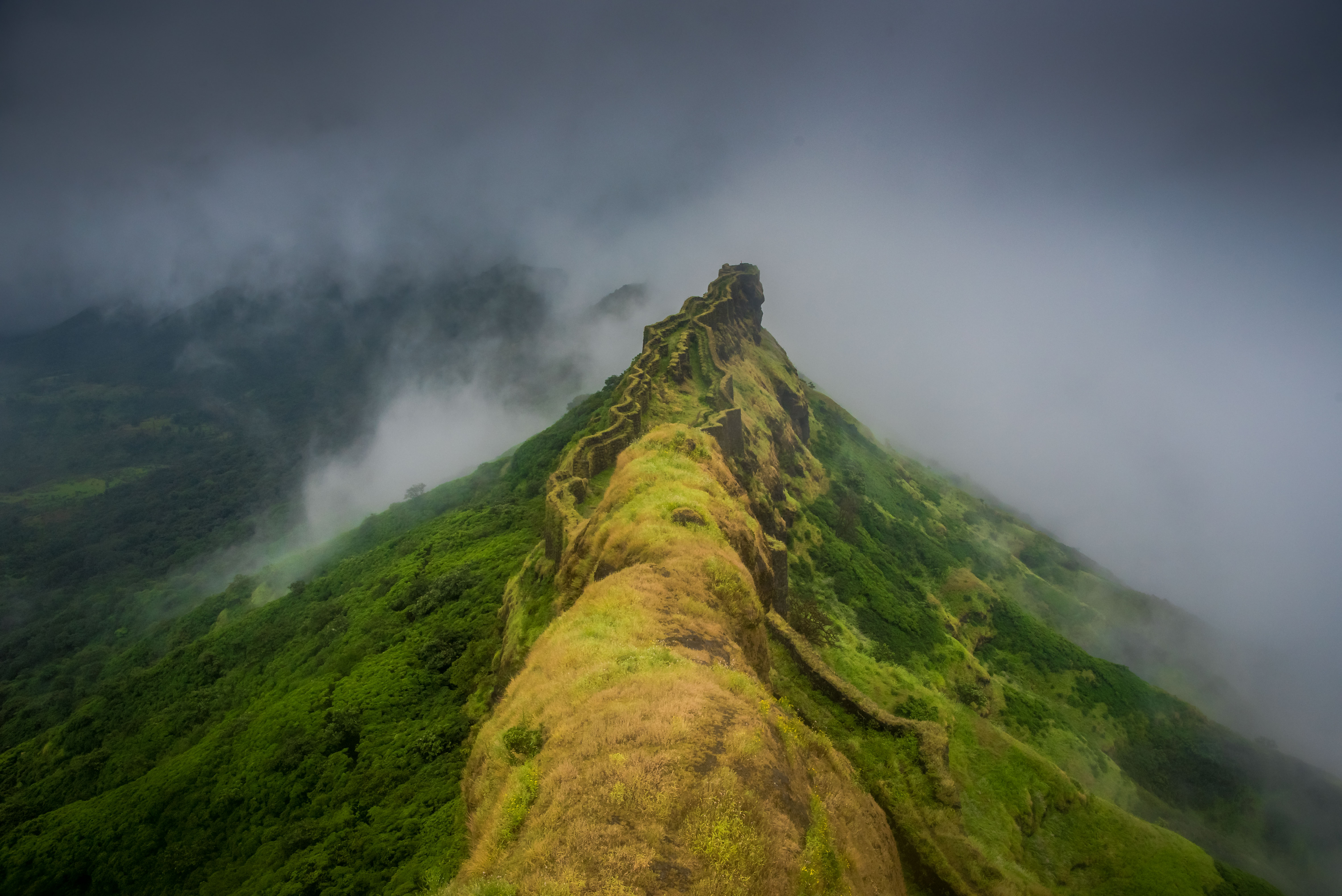
- Rajgad Fort

Site information
- Type: Hill fort
- Owner: Maratha Empire (1656–1689; 1707–1818); Mughal Empire (1689–1707); East India Company (1818–1858); British Empire (1858–1947); Government of India (1947–present)
- Open to the public: Yes

Location
- Shown within Maharashtra Rajgad Fort (India)
- Coordinates: 18°14′46″N 73°40′56″E
- Height: 1,376 m (4,514 ft)

Site history
- Architect: Chhatrapati Shivaji Maharaj

UNESCO World Heritage Site
- Part of: Maratha Military Landscapes of India
- Criteria: Cultural: iv, vi
- Reference: 1739-006
- Inscription: 2025 (47th Session)

Rajgad (literal meaning ruling fort) is a Hill region fort situated in the Pune district of Maharashtra, India. Formerly known as Murumbdev, the fort was the first capital of the Maratha Empire under the rule of Chhatrapati Shivaji Maharaj for almost 26 years, after which the capital was moved to the Raigad Fort. Treasures discovered from an adjacent fort called Torna were used to completely build and fortify the Rajgad Fort.

The Rajgad Fort is located around 60 km (37 mi) to the south-west of Pune and about 15 km (9.3 mi) west of Nasrapur in the Sahyadris range. The fort lies 1,376 m (4,514 ft) above the sea level. The fort's base had a diameter of about 40 km (25 mi), making it difficult to lay siege to, thereby enhancing its strategic value. The fort's ruins consist of palaces, water cisterns, and caves. This fort was built on a hill called Murumbadevi Dongar (mountain of the goddess Murumba). Rajgad boasts of the highest number of days Shivaji spent on any fort. This Fort was inscribed in 2025 as a component site of the Maratha Military Landscapes of India, which were added to the UNESCO World Heritage List during the 47th session of the World Heritage Committee.

== History ==
The fort has stood witness to many significant historic events including the birth of Shivaji's son Rajaram I, the death of Shivaji's wife Saibai, the return of Shivaji from Agra, the burial of Afzal Khan's head in the Mahadarwaja walls of Balle Killa, the strict words of Sonopant Dabir to Shivaji.

The Rajgad Fort was also one of the 12 forts that Chatrapati Shivaji Maharaj kept when he signed the Treaty of Purandar in 1665, with the Mughal general Jai Singh I, leader of the Mughal forces. Under this treaty, 23 forts were handed over to the Mughals.

=== List of chronological events ===
1647		Chhatrapati Shivaji captures the fort.
1649		Repairs on the fort began, and Shamrao Neelkanth Ranzekar was appointed as the Peshwa.
1654		The fort was renamed as "Rajgad". Construction on new fortifications and buildings commenced.
1658	14 January	Shivaji returns to Rajgad after conquering North Konkan.
1659	11 July	Shivaji shifts to Pratapgad in order to battle with Afzal Khan.
1659	5 September	Maharani Saibai (Shivaji's wife) died in the Rajgad Fort.
1660	July	Shivaji escaped from Siddi Jouhar's siege of Panhala and came to Vishalgad and then to Rajgad.
1661	July	The idol of Bhavanimata, which was to be established in Pratapgad, was first brought to Rajgad to be inspected by Jijabai.
1662	January	The construction of the Rajgad fort was completed, and Shivaji returned to the fort after capturing Pen and Kalyan.
1664	February	The booty of Surat was brought to Rajgad.
1665	30 April	The Mughals were unsuccessful in their attack on the fort.
1665	June	Shivaji's letter of accepting defeat was sent to Jaisingh.
1670	24 February	Rajaram was born on the Fort.
1671		The repairing of the fort began at an expected cost of 10,000 hons.
1674	6 June	Coronation of Shivaji happened on Riagard Fort
1689	June	The fort was captured by the Mughals after Sambhaji was murdered.
1692		Shankarji Narayan captured the fort from the Mughals.
1697		Rajaram returned to Maharashtra and made Rajgad his new capital
1701	4 August	Shahaji Mohite was made the havaldar of Padmavati Machi
1704	18 February	The fort was handed over to Aurangzeb as part of a treaty. The fort was renamed to Nabishahagad. Sidojirao Thopte and Santaji Shilimkar were killed here by Aurangzeb.
1707	29 May	Gunaji Sawant captured the fort, and the Maratha War of Independence ended.
1709		Shahu made provisions for the repairs of the fort.
1818		The Rajgad Fort passed into the hands of the British.

== Tourism ==
The fort is a significant tourist destination, especially during the monsoon. Visitors prefer to stay overnight at the fort, as it is huge and cannot be explored in a single day. The Padmavati temple on the fort can accommodate around 50 people. Water tanks provide fresh water year-round. Villagers from the foothills of Rajgad sell local antiques and items to these tourists.

== Gallery ==
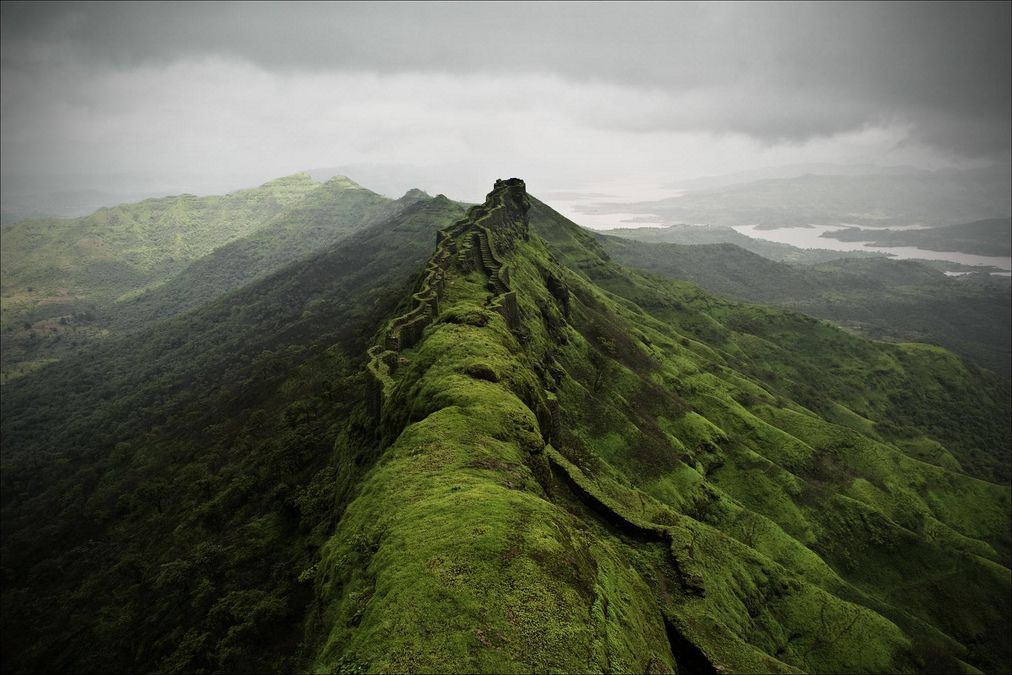
Suvela machi

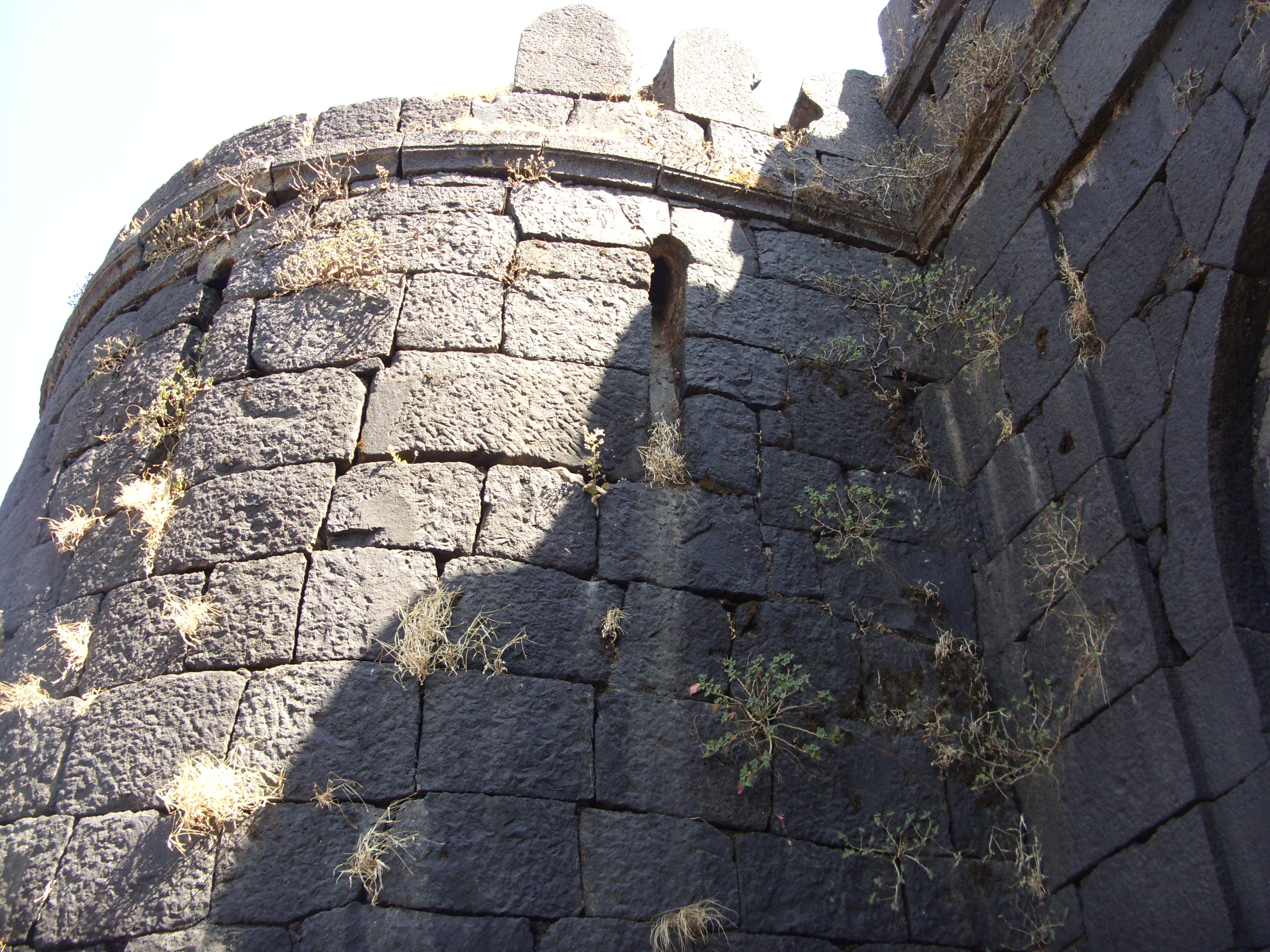
Main door bastion

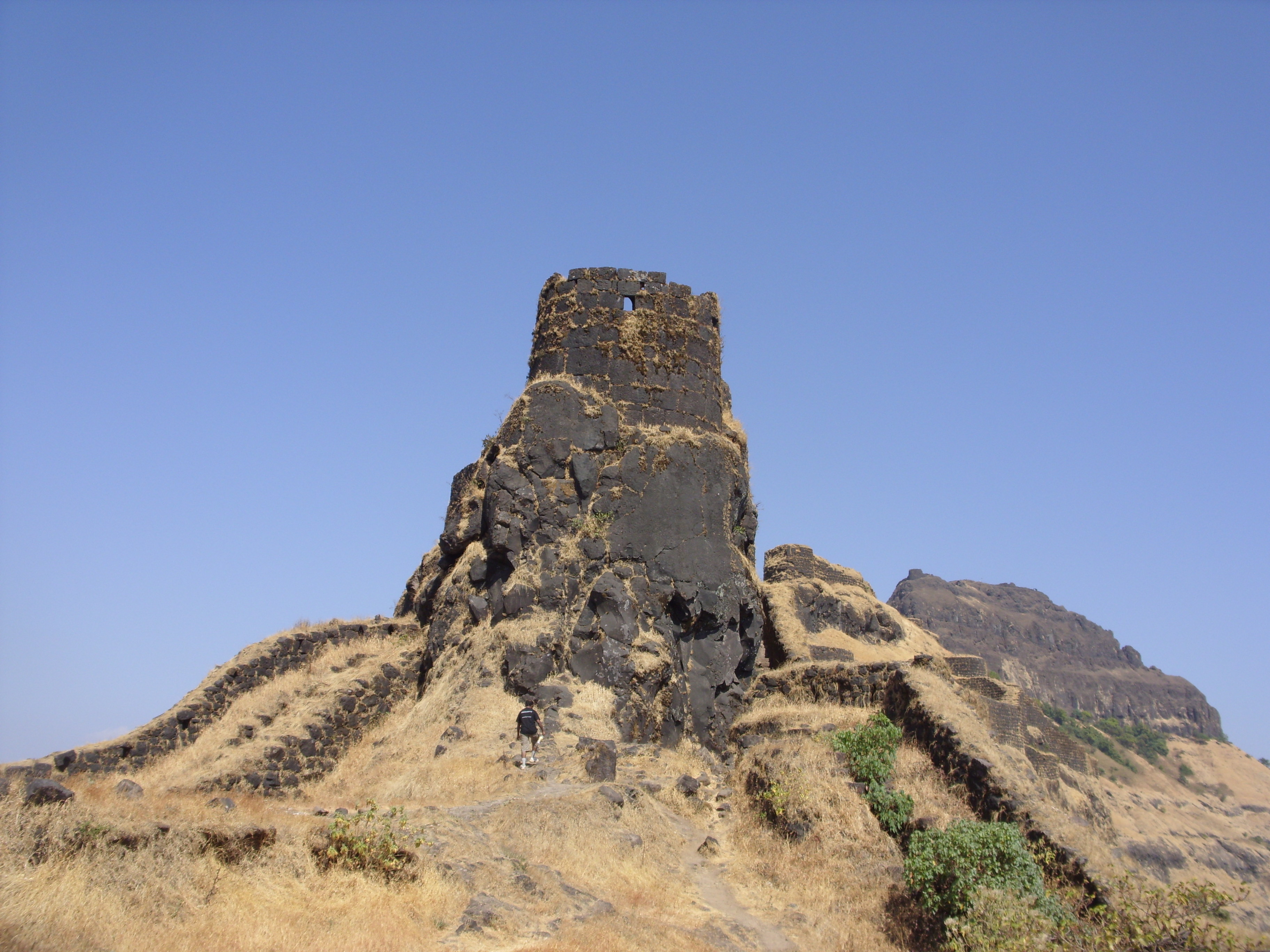
Bastion

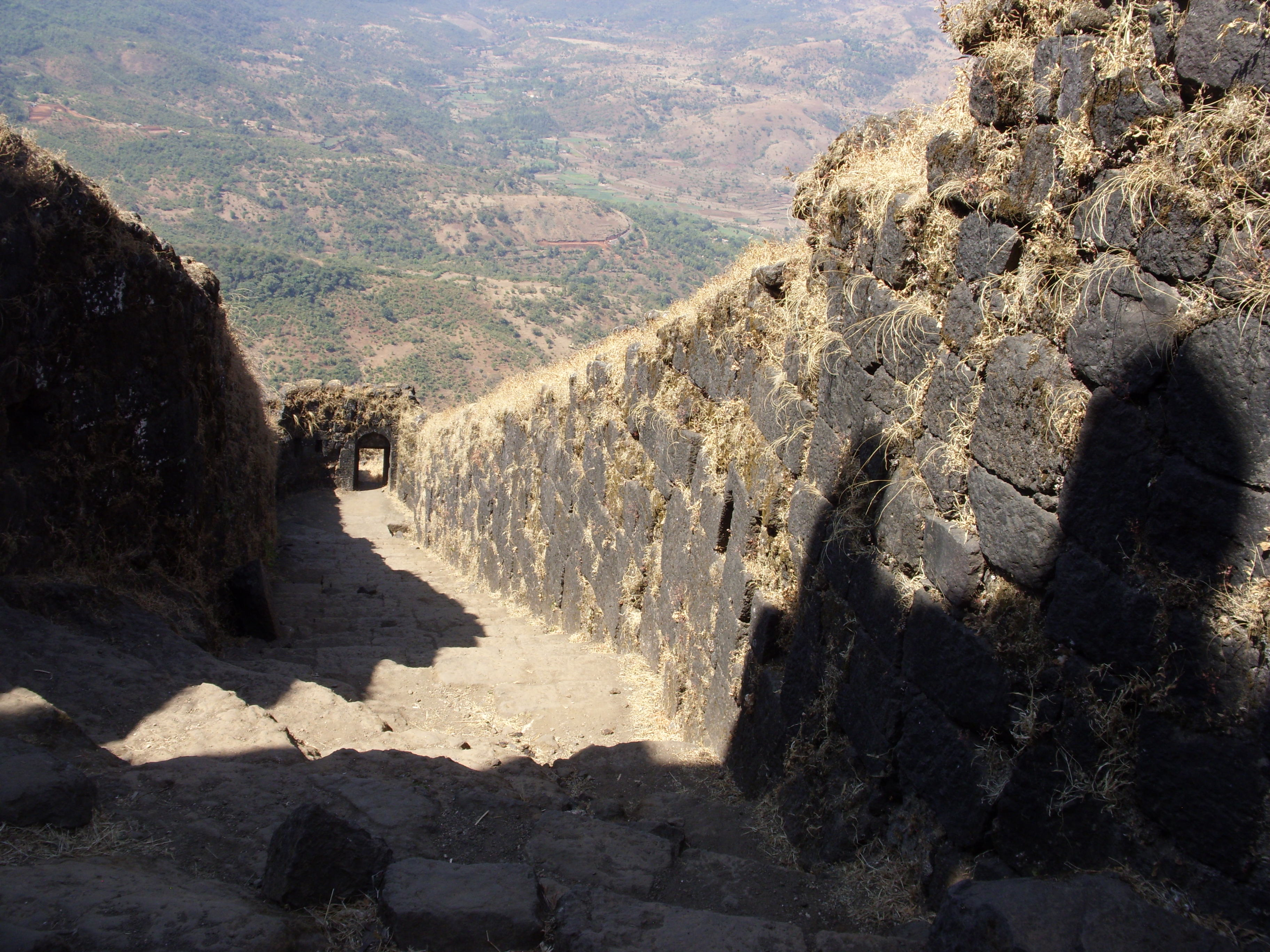
steps

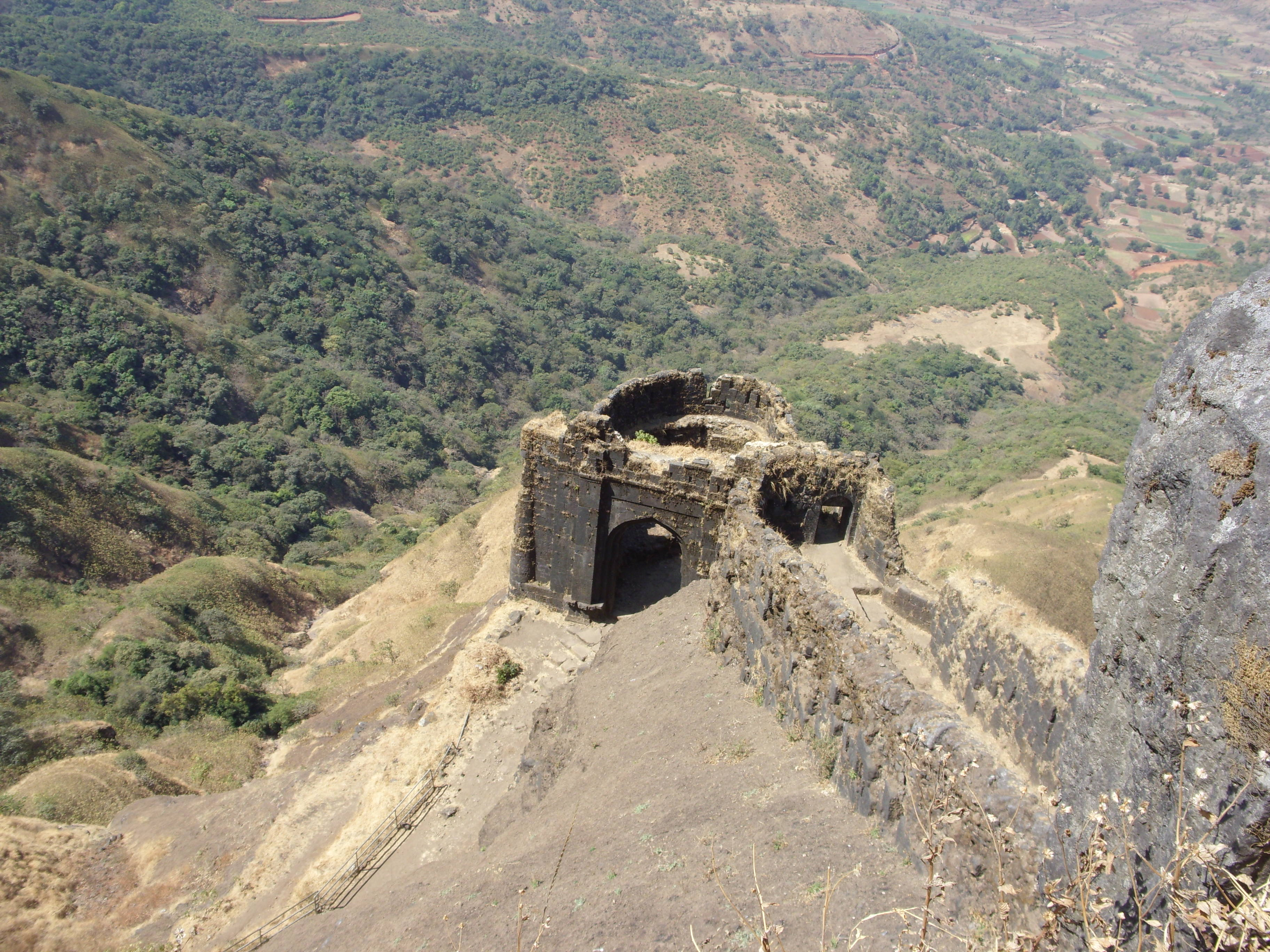
Pali darwaza

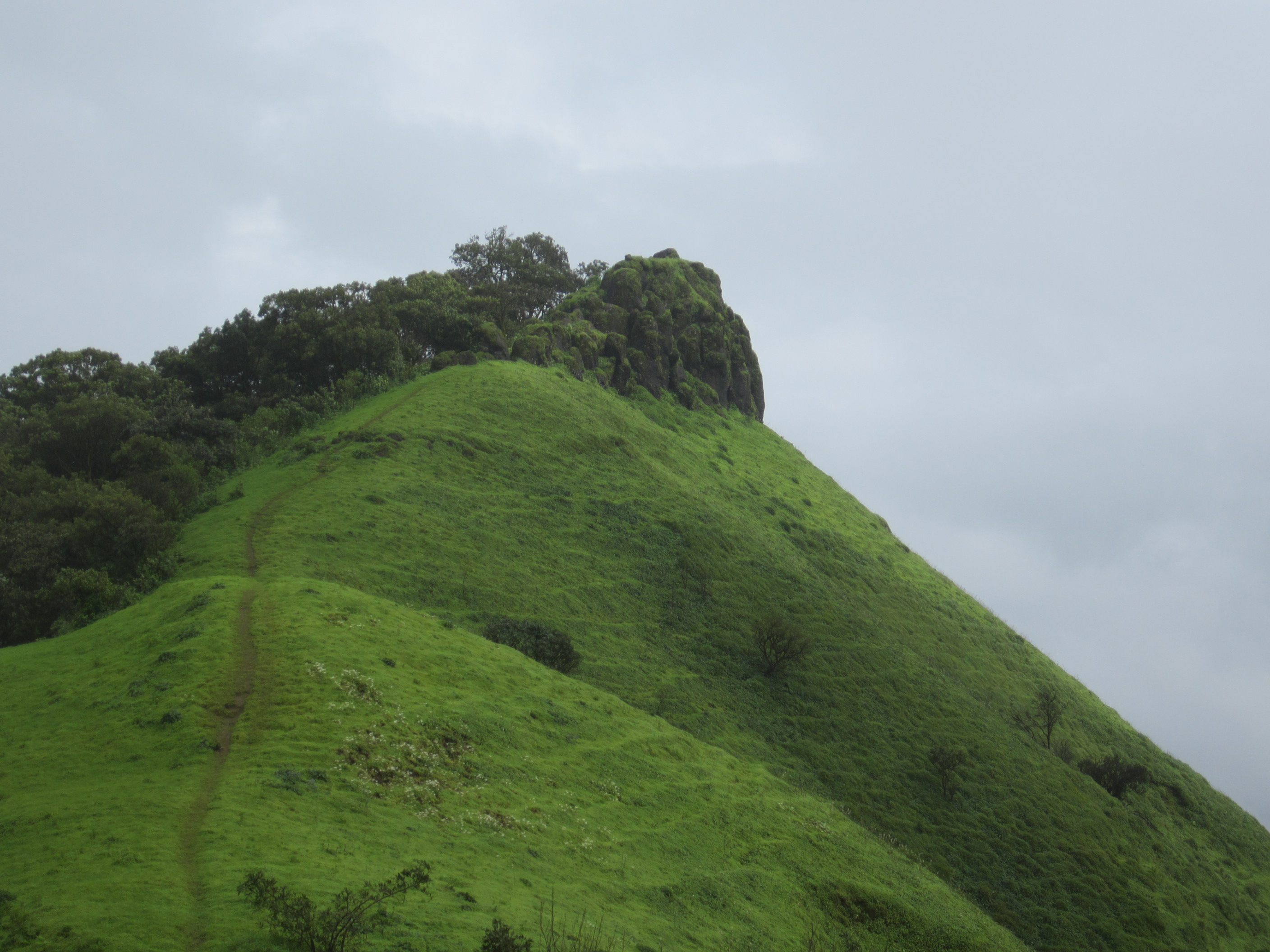
Duba

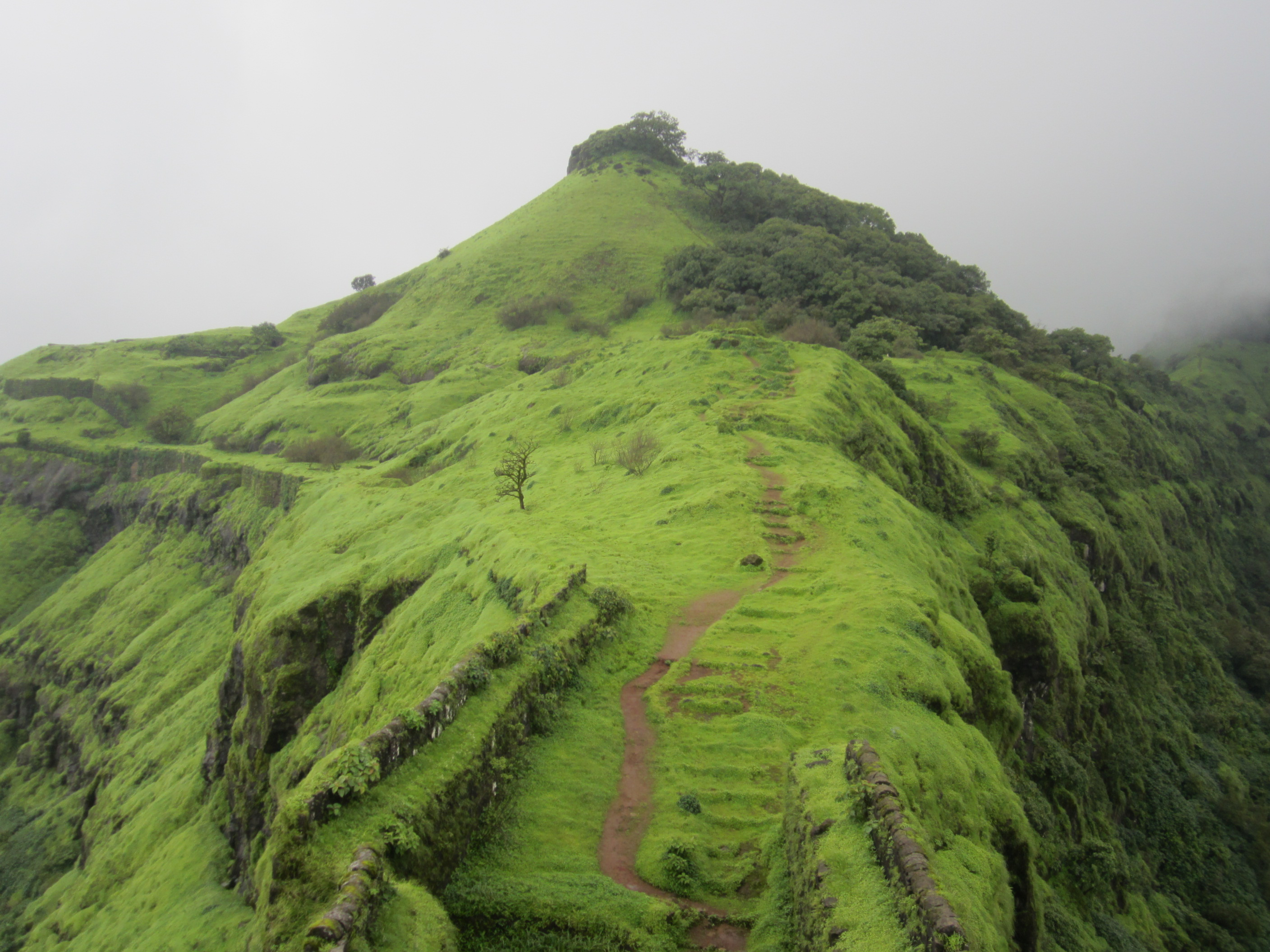
Duba view

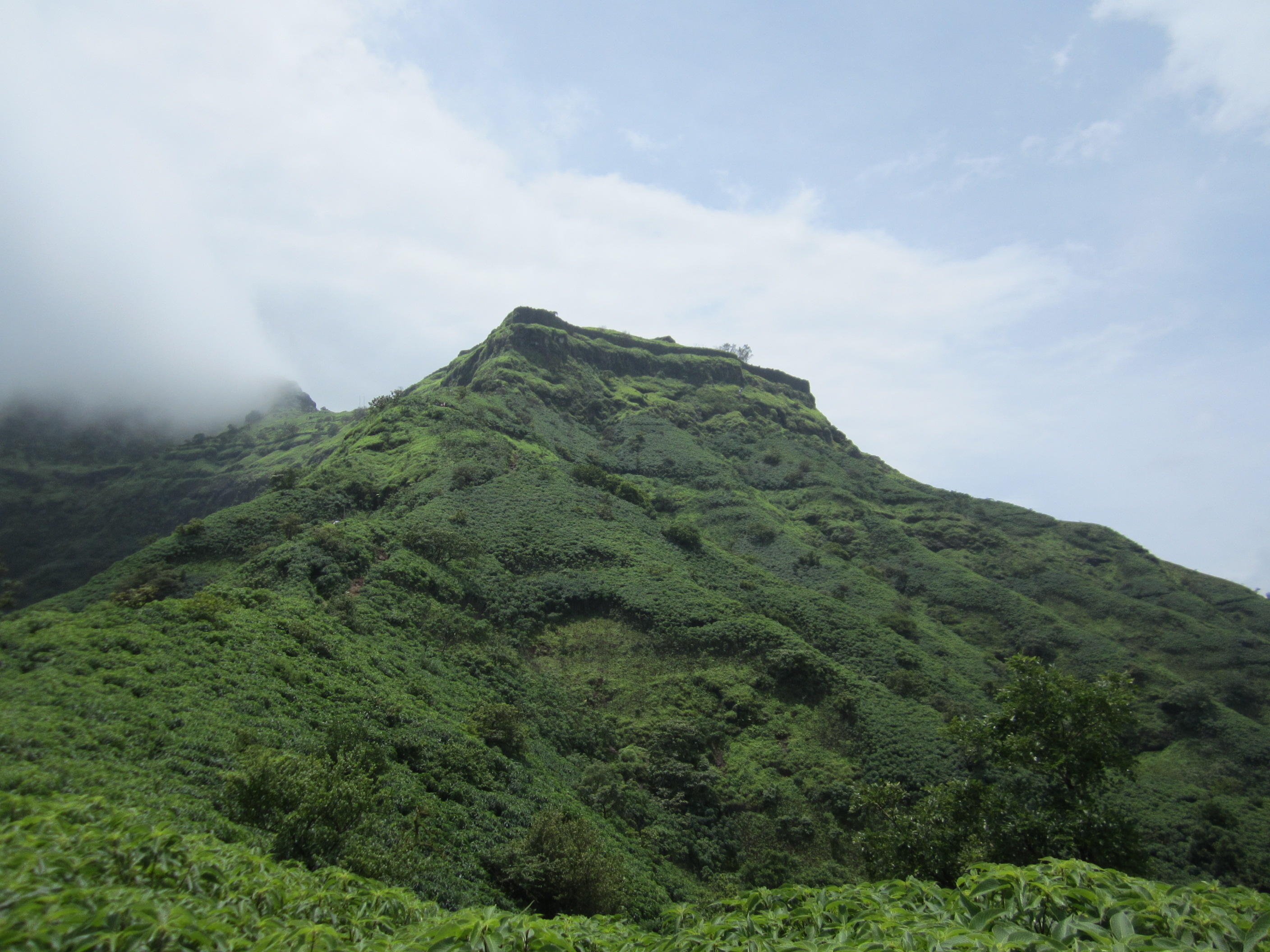
Fort mountain

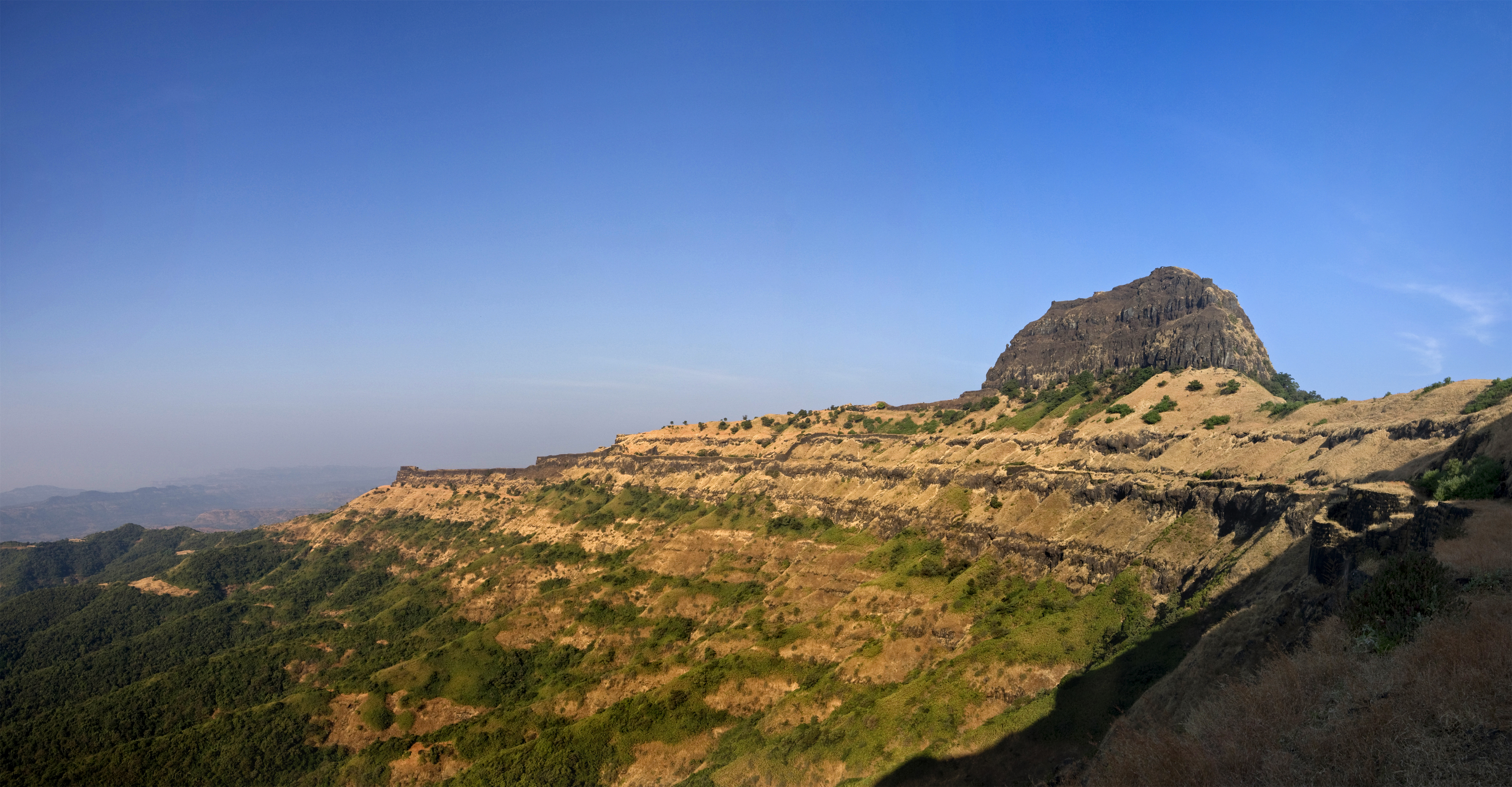
Bale Killa of Rajgad

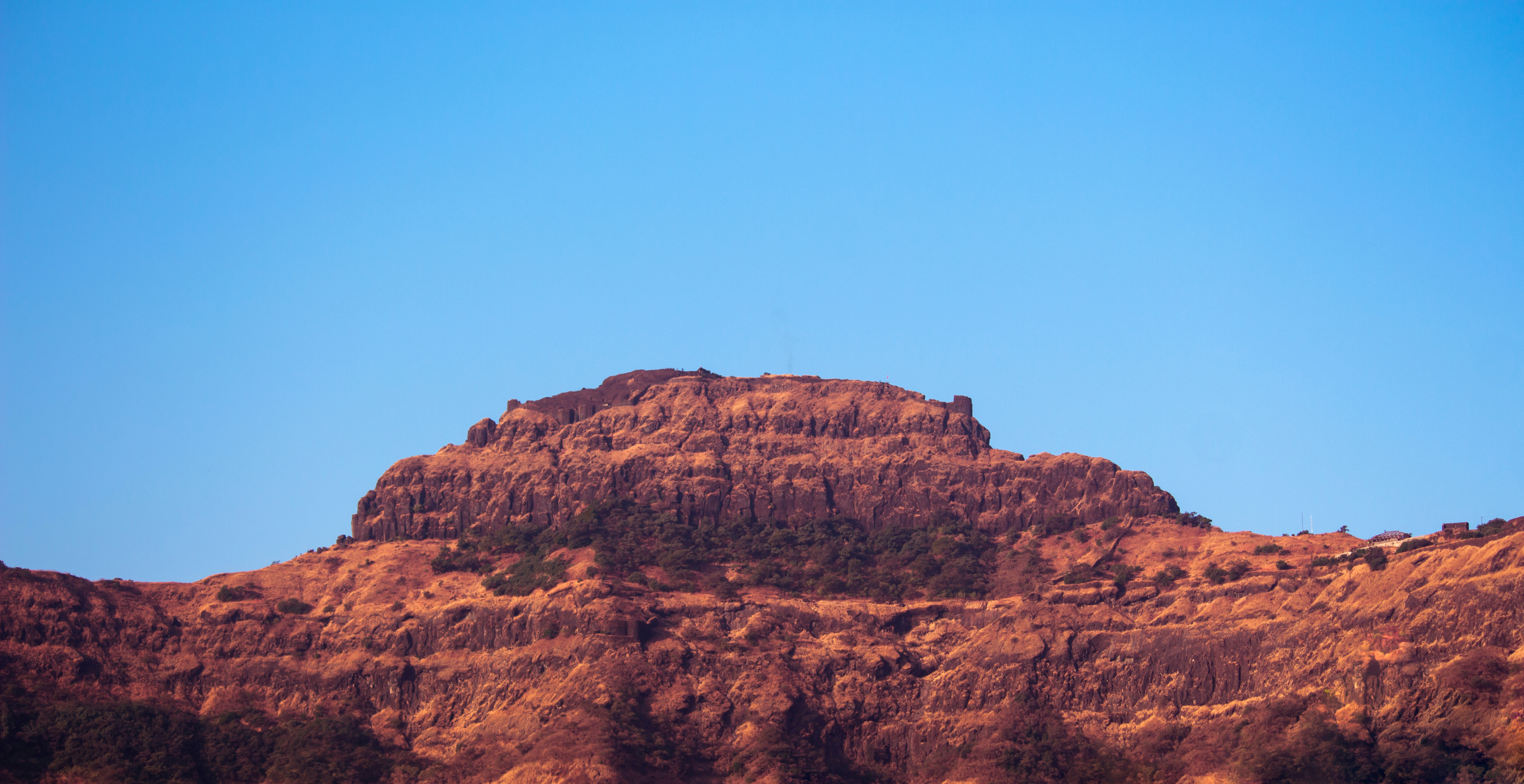
Ballekilla, Rajgad

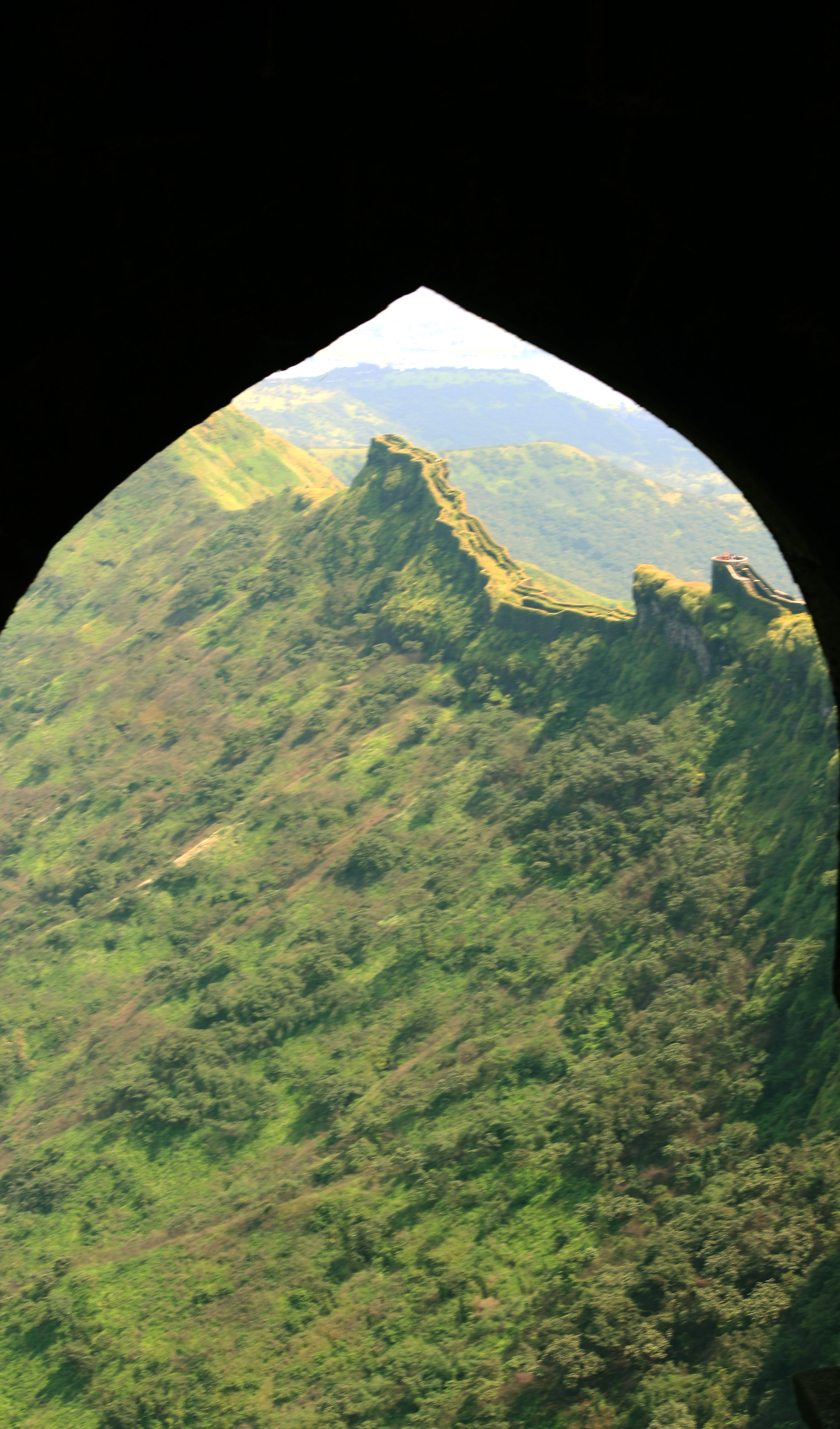
Suvela Machi view from Rajgad balekilla Mahadwar

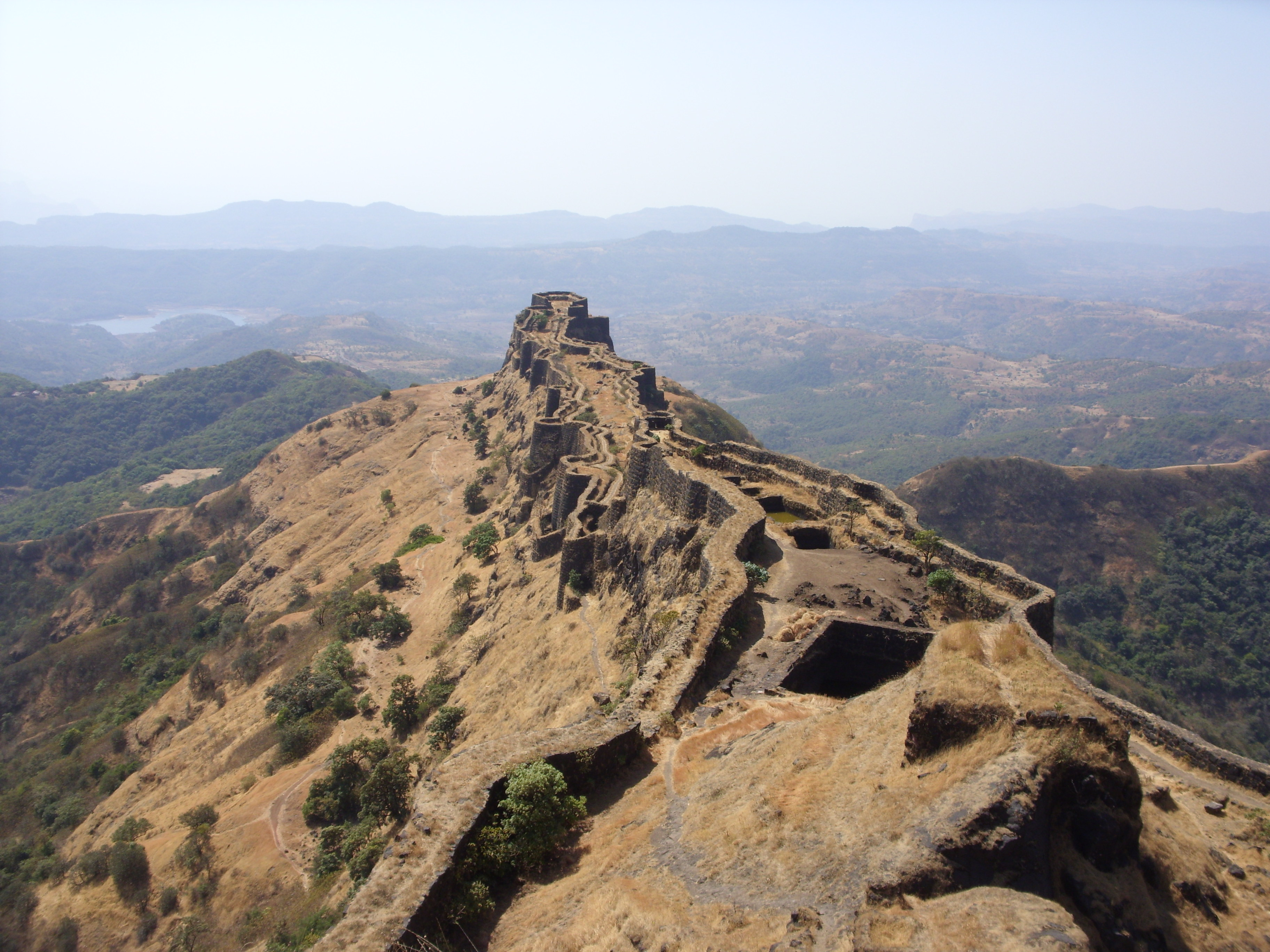
Sanjeevani machi

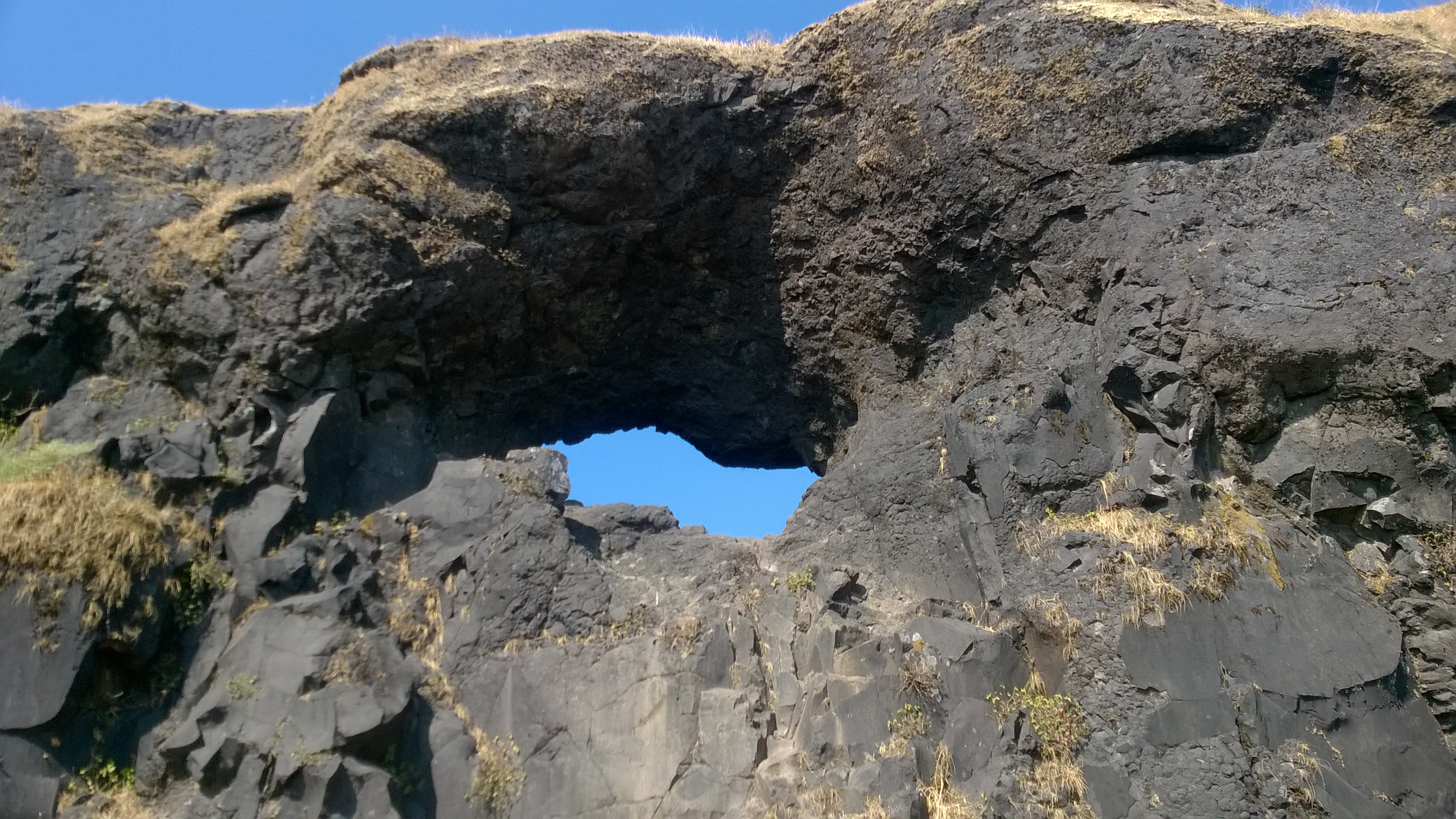
Nedha at Suvela machi

== See also ==
- List of forts in Maharashtra
