= Upalve =

Village in Maharashtra

- Village
- Interactive map of Upalve
- Coordinates: 17°51′49″N 74°22′43″E
- Country: India
- State: Maharashtra
- District: Satara
- Taluka: Phaltan

Languages
  - Official: Marathi
- Time zone: UTC+5:30 (IST)

Upalve is an village in the Satara district of the Indian state of Maharashtra. It is located to the south of the city of Phaltan and beside the Sitamai, where the River Banganga starts.
