= Girvi =

Village in Maharashtra, India

Coordinates: 17°53′22″N 74°27′14″E

Girvi is a village in Phaltan taluka of Satara district in the Indian state of Maharashtra. It is situated at the southwest of Phaltan near Mahadeo hills.

== Demography ==
Girvi has population of 5050 out of which 2618 are males while 2432 are females according to the 2011 census.
