= Sai Bhonsale =

Maharani of the Marathas from 1640 to 1659

Saibai Bhonsale
- Maharani of the Maratha Kingdom
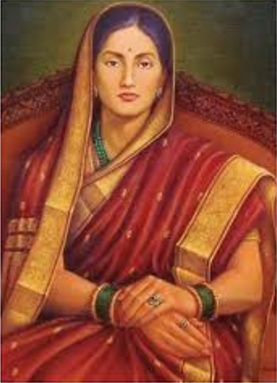
- A 2012 artist's rendition of Maharani Saibai

Chief Queen Consort of the Maratha Kingdom
- Tenure: 16 May 1640 – 5 September 1659
- Predecessor: Position established
- Successor: Soyarabai
- Born: Saibai Nimbalkar; 29 October 1633; Phaltan, Satara (present-day Maharashtra, India)
- Died: 5 September 1659 (aged 25); Rajgad Fort, Pune, Maratha Kingdom (present-day Maharastra, India)
- Spouse: Shivaji I
- Issue: Sambhaji; Sakhubai; Ranubai; Ambikabai
Names
- Saibai Shivajiraje Bhonsale
Regnal name
- Shrimant Akhand Soubhagyavati Maharani Saibai Rani Saheb Bhosale
- House: Nimbalkar (by birth); Bhosale (by marriage)
- Father: Mudhoji Rao Naik Nimbalkar
- Mother: Reubai
- Religion: Hinduism

Saibai Bhonsale (née Nimbalkar; 29 October 1633 – 5 September 1659) was the first wife of Chhatrapati Shivaji, the founder of the Maratha Kingdom. She was the mother of her husband's successor Chhatrapati Sambhaji.

== Family ==
Saibai was a member of the prominent Nimbalkar family, whose members were the rulers of Phaltan from the era of the Pawar dynasty and served the Deccan sultanates and the Mughal Empire. She was a daughter of the fifteenth Raja of Phaltan, Mudhojirao Naik Nimbalkar, and a sister of the sixteenth Raja, Bajaji Rao Naik Nimbalkar. Saibai's mother Reubai was from the Shirke family.

== Marriage ==
Rani Saibai and Shivaji Maharaj were married while still in their childhood on 16 May 1640 at Lal Mahal, Pune. The marriage was arranged by his mother, Jijabai; but was evidently not attended by his father, Shahaji nor his brothers, Sambhaji and Ekoji. Thus, Shahaji soon summoned his new daughter-in-law, son, and his mother, Jijabai, to Bangalore, where he lived with his second wife, Tukabai. Shahaji held a grand wedding ceremony at Bangalore.

Rani Saibai and Shivaji Raje shared a close relationship with each other. She is said to have been a wise woman and a loyal consort to him. By all accounts, Saibai was a beautiful, good-natured, and affectionate woman. She is described as having been a "gentle and selfless person."

All of her endearing personal qualities, however, were a sharp contrast to Shivaji's second wife, Soyarabai, who was an intriguing lady. She also had significant influence over her husband and the royal family as well. During Saibai's life time, the entire household of Shivaji bore a homogeneous atmosphere despite the fact that most of his marriages were performed due to political considerations.

After Saibai's untimely death in 1659 followed by Jijabai's death in 1674, Shivaji's private life became clouded with anxiety and unhappiness. Although Soyarabai had gained prominence in the royal household following their deaths, she was not an affectionate consort like Saibai, whom Shivaji had dearly loved.

=== Children ===
During the course of their nineteen years of marriage, Saibai and Shivaji became parents of four children: Sakavarbai (nicknamed "Sakhubai"), Ranubai, Ambikabai, and Sambhaji. Sakhubai was married to her first-cousin, Mahadji, the son of Saibai's brother, Bajaji Rao Naik Nimbalkar. Ranubai married into the Jadhav family. Ambikabai married Harji Raje Mahadik in 1668. Saibai's fourth issue was her only son, Sambhaji, who was born in 1657 and was Shivaji's eldest son and thus, his heir-apparent. The birth of Sambhaji was an occasion of great joy and significance in the royal household for many different reasons.

== Death ==
Saibai died in 1659 in Rajgad Fort while Shivaji Maharaj was making preparations for his meeting with Afzal Khan at Pratapgad. She was ill from the time she gave birth to Sambhaji and her illness became serious preceding her death. Sambhaji was taken care by her trustworthy Dhaarau. Sambhaji was two years old at the time of his mother's death and was brought up by his paternal grandmother, Jijabai. Saibai's samadhi is situated at Rajgad Fort.

== In popular culture ==
Literature

- Shivpatni Saibai, a biography of Saibai's life written by Dr. Sadashiv Shivade.

Films

- Umadevi Nadgonde, popularly known as Baby Shakuntala portrayed Saibai in the Marathi language 1955 film Chhatrapati Shivaji Maharaj.
- Smita Patil played Saibai in the 1974 film Raja Shiv Chhatrapati.
- Isha Keskar played Saibai in the 2022 film Sher Shivraj, directed by Digpal Digpal Lanjekar.
- Pallavi Vaidya played Saibai in the 2024 film Dharmarakshak Mahaveer Chhatrapati Sambhaji Maharaj.
- Genelia Deshmukh portrayed Saibai in adulthood, and Kimaya Mestry in childhood in the 2026 Marathi film, Raja Shivaji.

Television

- In Colors TV's 2012 historical drama, Veer Shivaji, Saibai was portrayed by an actress Palak Jain as a teenager and by Sonia Sharma as an adult.
- Rujuta Deshmmukh portrayed Saibai in the popular TV series, Raja Shivchhatrapati, which aired on Star Pravah.
- Poorva Gokhale portrayed Saibai in Swarajyarakshak Sambhaji, based on the life of Sambhaji.
- Samira Gujar-Joshi portrayed Saibai in adulthood, while Gargi Ranade in childhood in Swarajyajanani Jijamata, based on the life of Jijabai.
