= Sweet sorghum =

Any of the varieties of the sorghum plant with a high sugar content

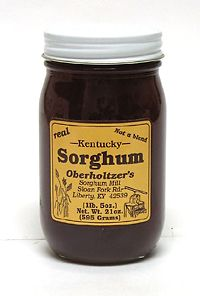
A jar of sweet sorghum syrup

Sweet sorghum, sorgo, or sorgho is any of the many varieties of the sorghum grass whose stalks have a high sugar content. Sweet sorghum thrives better under drier and warmer conditions than many other crops and is grown primarily for forage, silage, and syrup production.

Sweet sorghum syrup is known as sorghum molasses in some regions of the United States, though in most of the U.S. the term molasses refers to a sweet syrupy byproduct of sugarcane or sugar beet sugar extraction.

== Cultivation ==
Sweet sorghum has been widely cultivated in the U.S. since the 1850s for use in sweeteners, primarily in the form of sorghum syrup. In 1857 James F. C. Hyde wrote, "Few subjects are of greater importance to us, as a people, than the producing of sugar; for no country in the world consumes so much as the United States, in proportion to its population." The price of sugar was rising because of decreased production in the British West Indies and more demand for confectionery and fruit preserves, and the United States was actively searching for a sugar plant that could be produced in northern states. The "Chinese sugar-cane" as it was called was viewed as a plant that would be productive and high-yielding in that region.

In the early 1860s, the American Civil War not only disrupted both interstate and maritime commerce but also diverted commodities from civilian to military purchases; these factors rendered some food and fiber supplies, including sugar cane and the sugar and molasses made from it, unreliable and expensive. In particular, the South was under naval blockade by the Union navy, making importation of Caribbean cane sugar and molasses expensive and scarce via blockade running. Under these conditions, some farms grew sweet sorghum for syrup to substitute for cane sugar and molasses, which helped ensconce sweet sorghum in Southern food culture. At the same time, anti-slavery families boycotting sweeteners made under slavery as "blood-stained" could grow sorghum and make the syrup in the North, so it was not solely a Southern foodstuff.

By the early 1900s, the U.S. produced 20 million US gallons (76,000 m^{3}) of sweet sorghum syrup annually. Making syrup from sorghum (as from sugar cane) is heavily labor-intensive. Following World War II, with the declining availability of farm labor, sorghum syrup production fell drastically. Currently, less than 1 million US gallons (3,800 m^{3}) are produced annually in the U.S.

In Central India it was introduced in the early 1970s by Nimbkar Agricultural Research Institute for ethanol and syrup production. Sweet sorghum syrup has shown good antioxidant properties and is found to be useful in food, beverage and pharmaceutical industries. Presently it is grown on large area as a fodder crop.

Most sorghum grown for syrup production is grown in Alabama, Arkansas, Georgia, Iowa, Kentucky, Mississippi, North Carolina, Missouri, and Tennessee.

== Uses ==
Sorghum syrup and hot biscuits are a traditional breakfast in the Southern United States. Sorghum syrup is also used on pancakes, cornmeal mush, grits and other hot cereals. It can be used as a cooking ingredient with a similar sweetening effect as molasses, though blackstrap molasses still has a higher nutritional value than sorghum syrup in most regards. In India sweet sorghum syrup is promoted as a health food.

In the U.S. since the 1950s, sorghum has been raised primarily for forage and silage, with sorghum cultivation for cattle feed concentrated in the Great Plains (Texas, Kansas, and Nebraska are the leading producers), particularly in areas where insufficient rainfall and high temperature make corn production unprofitable.

Grain sorghum has also been used by the ethanol industry for quite some time because it yields about the same amount of ethanol per bushel as corn. As new-generation ethanol processes are studied and improved, sorghum's role may continue to expand. Texas A&M University ran trials to ascertain the best varieties for ethanol production from sorghum leaves and stalks in the USA.

In India and other places, sweet sorghum stalks are used for producing biofuel by squeezing the juice and then fermenting into ethanol. The crop is particularly suitable for growing in dryland conditions, as it only extracts one-seventh of the water used by sugarcane.

A 2015 study by researchers at the International Crops Research Institute for the Semi-Arid Tropics (ICRISAT) found that growing sweet sorghum instead of grain sorghum could increase farmers' incomes by US$40 per hectare per crop because it can provide food, feed, and fuel. With grain sorghum currently grown on over 11 million ha in Asia and on 23.4 million ha in Africa, a switch to sweet sorghum could have a considerable economic impact.

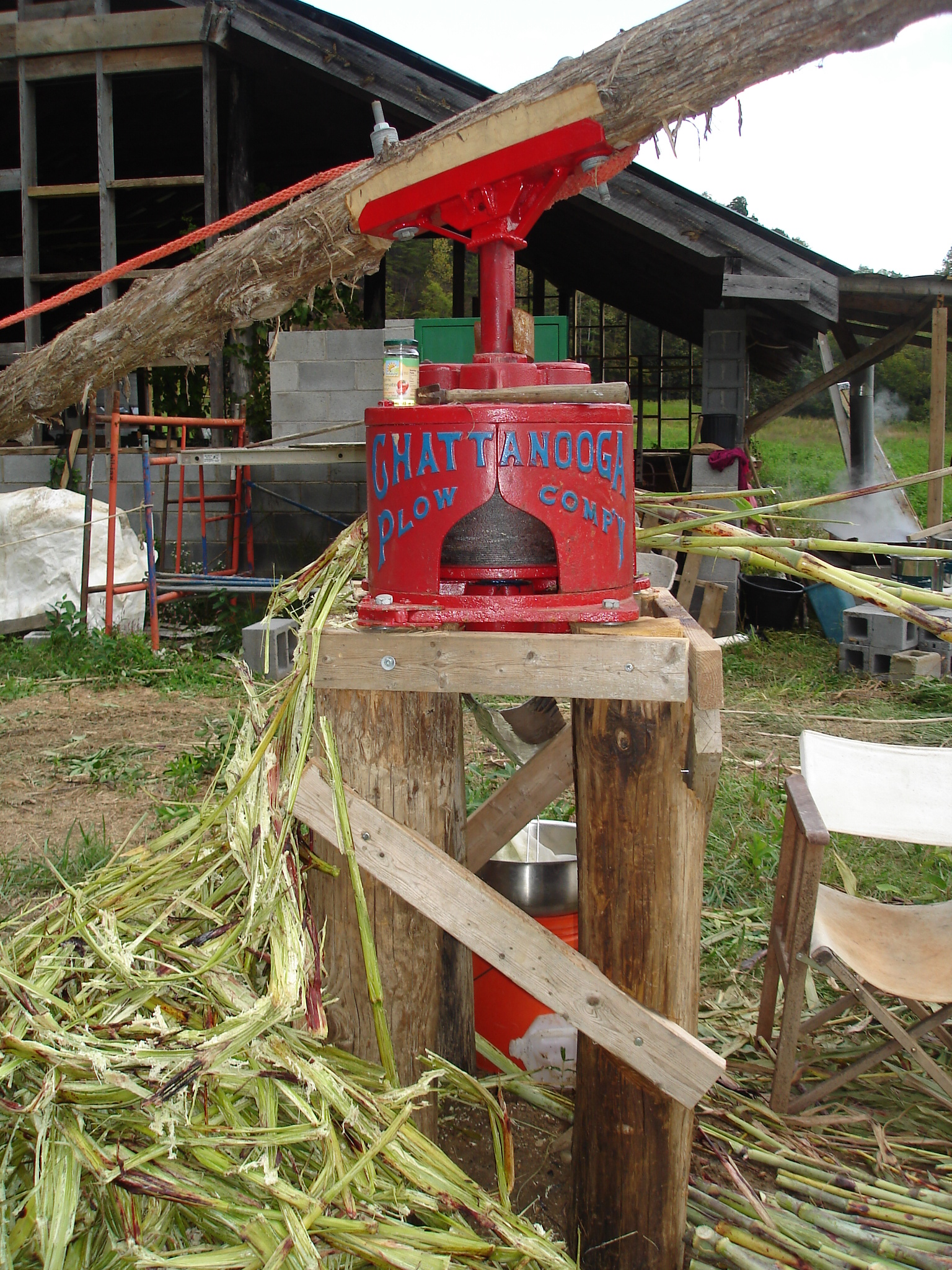
Horse-driven, antique sorghum-cane juicer being operated at an organic farm in central North Carolina, for syrup production

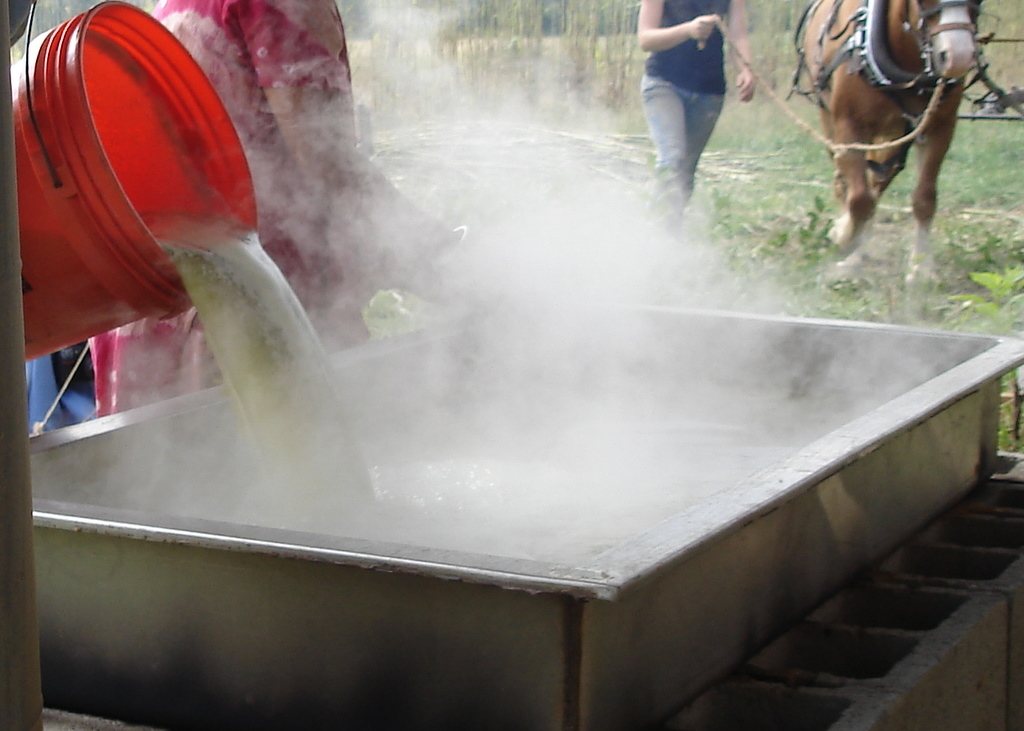
Adding freshly squeezed juice to a simmering pan of syrup on an open fire, much as it was done in the 19th century

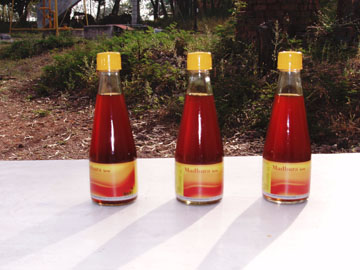
Madhura sweet sorghum syrup sold in India

== See also ==
- Camp Sorghum, historical use of sorghum molasses
- List of syrups
