= Occupational therapist =

Health care profession

Occupational therapists (OTs) are health care professionals specializing in occupational therapy and occupational science. OTs and occupational therapy assistants (OTAs) use scientific bases and a holistic perspective to promote a person's ability to fulfill their daily routines and roles. OTs have training in the physical, psychological, and social aspects of human functioning deriving from an education grounded in anatomical and physiological concepts, and psychological perspectives. They enable individuals across the lifespan by optimizing their abilities to perform activities that are meaningful to them ("occupations"). Human occupations include activities of daily living, work/vocation, play, education, leisure, rest and sleep, and social participation.

OTs work in a variety of fields, including pediatrics, orthopedics, neurology, low vision therapy, physical rehabilitation, mental health, assistive technology, oncological rehabilitation, and geriatrics. OTs are employed in healthcare settings such as hospitals, nursing homes, residential care facilities, home health agencies, outpatient rehabilitation centers, etc. OTs are also employed by school systems, and as consultants by businesses to address employee work-related safety and productivity. Many OTs are also self-employed and own independent practices. In the United States, OTs are also employed as commissioned officers in the Army, Navy and Air force branches of the military. In the US Army, OTs are part of the Army Medical Specialist Corps. OTs are also a part of the United States Public Health Service Commissioned Corps, one of eight uniformed services of the United States.

Occupational therapy interventions are aimed to restore/ improve functional abilities, and/or alleviate/ eliminate limitations or disabilities through compensatory/adaptive methods/and or drug use. OTs, thus, evaluate and address both the individual's capacities and his/ her environment (physical and psycho-social) in order to help the individual optimize their function and fulfill their occupational roles. They often recommend adaptive equipment/ assistive technology products and provide training in its use to help mitigate limitations and enhance safety.

== Preparation and qualifications ==
To practice as an occupational therapist, the individual trained in the United States:

- Has graduated from an occupational therapy program (currently at the master's or doctoral levels) accredited by the Accreditation Council for Occupational Therapy Education (ACOTE) or predecessor organizations;
- Has successfully completed a period of supervised fieldwork experience required by the recognized educational institution where the applicant met the academic requirements of an educational program for occupational therapists that is accredited by ACOTE or predecessor organizations;
- Has passed a nationally recognized registration examination for occupational therapists (OTR, for "Occupational Therapist, Registered, Licensed") administered by the National Board for Certification in Occupational Therapy (NBCOT); and
- Fulfills state requirements for licensure, certification, or registration.

== Places of work ==
Employment may include hospitals, clinics, day and community-based rehabilitation centers, home care programs, special schools, industry, and private enterprise. Many occupational therapists work in private practice and as educators and consultants. Occupational therapist practitioners (OTPs) also work in community outreach, after school programs, community centers, and anywhere meaningful life activities occur. Occupational therapists meet clients in natural settings where real life activities and routines occur.

== Role ==
Occupational therapists are trained healthcare professionals who promote health, well-being, and active participation in everyday activities. One of their primary goals is to help their patients function effectively in their roles and routines in everyday life.

Occupational therapy practitioners work with clients of all ages in diverse practice areas, some of which include rehabilitation after illness/injury, pediatrics, mental health, geriatrics, assistive technology, health and wellness, pain management, work/industry, and community accessibility.

Occupational therapists may promote client participation and independence in life by strengthening client factors and performance skills such as physical, cognitive, and perceptual abilities. OTs may also help clients achieve their desired outcomes by facilitating their use of adaptive strategies, adaptive equipment, and/or environmental modifications.

Occupational therapists focus on providing a client-centered, holistic approach to each patient, using therapeutic interventions geared toward the person, occupation, and environment. Occupational therapists bring attention to a person's unique identity, abilities, strengths, interests, and environment to provide strategies and techniques that will allow clients to live life to the fullest. Occupational therapists foster promotion of self-esteem, self-efficacy, and a sense of achievement through doing, being, and belonging in a client's choice of activities, roles, routines, contexts, and environments. Occupational therapists can also provide prevention and education regarding physical, mental, and social-emotional aspects of health and wellness within the realm of prevention, promotion, and intervention.

Occupational therapists are often involved in multidisciplinary teams that may include health care practitioners such as physicians, nurses, physiotherapists, speech and language therapists, rehabilitation psychologists, and social workers. Building effective partnerships with other professionals in the interest of quality service provision to clients are essential to valuable practice. Collaboration with members of the client's team enriches interdisciplinary communication and ensures the best outcomes for clients. The client and their family and caregivers remain the central focus and driving force of the team.

=== Work-related therapy ===
Some occupational therapists treat individuals whose ability to function in a work environment has been impaired. These practitioners arrange employment, evaluate the work environment, plan work activities, and assess the client's progress. Therapists also may collaborate with the client and the employer to modify the work environment so that the work can be successfully completed.

=== Pediatric practice ===
Pediatric occupational therapists support their communities by providing services to infants, toddlers, children, youth, and their families across a variety of settings that might include schools, clinics, and homes. They do this by implementing intervention that is driven by science and backed by evidence. A child's life is made up of "occupations". These "occupations", or daily activities, include play, learning, and socializing. The role of the pediatric occupational therapist is to support the child in any environment in which the child is not able to carry out the desired occupations. The most common areas of practice for a pediatric occupational therapist include: neonatal intensive care units (NICU), early intervention, schools, and outpatient services. Areas of emerging practice include primary care and community-based health promotion.

==== Neonatal intensive care units (NICU) ====
From the beginning of life, occupational therapists might work with infants who are medically fragile in NICU of medical centers. An occupational therapist might address areas such as feeding/nutrition, positioning, development, sensory processing and integration, and sleep.

==== Early intervention ====
An occupational therapist may work with children in early intervention, from birth to three years old. The role of the occupational therapist is to support the child's needs by collaborating with the caregivers/parents. The goal of the occupational therapist in early intervention is to support the achievement of developmental milestones. They do this by providing intervention and education in the context of play and daily living. Therapeutic intervention may include feeding/nutrition, physical development, play skill development, social/emotional development. In early intervention, a strong emphasis is placed on parent/caregiver education. The reason Occupational Therapists are vital to the NICU, is due to the vulnerability of premature infants. NICU-based therapists teach the skills the infant needs to live optimally. However, they do this while simultaneously understanding the medical interventions occurring, and how these medical needs need to be worked around during a therapy session. Infants who received more therapy displayed better neurological behaviors. Occupational Therapists mainly focus on positioning the child, including equipment and how to promote optimal development.

==== Schools ====
Once a child is over the age of three and meets eligibility for special education services, the child may receive occupational therapy services through an Individualized Education Program (IEP). In the school setting, the goal of occupational therapy is to support the implementation of the IEP. The occupational therapist might do this by providing direct or indirect services. Direct services might include individual or group services. Indirect services might include consultation with their school team, creating modifications and/or accommodations for the classroom, and/or providing training to the school team.

==== Outpatient services ====
Occupational therapists might also work with children in an outpatient clinic. When serving children in an outpatient clinic, services typically have to meet the criteria for medical necessity. Occupational therapists continue to focus on "occupations"; however, the "occupations" typically are related to medically necessary occupations such as safety and health.

==== Primary care ====
Primary care for occupational therapists is an emerging area of practice. Traditionally a primary care office included physician, physician assistant, nurse, or nurse practitioner. In this model, the physician is limited to diagnosing and medical management. The field of occupational therapy is advocating for occupational therapists to become a part of primary care teams. In regard to children, an occupational therapist could contribute by providing early parent training, developmental screenings, tips for wellness and prevention.

=== Community-based ===
Another emerging area of practice for occupational therapy is promoting health and wellness through community-based programming. Occupational therapist can do this by coaching and consulting in the community. It is implemented through not just the OTs but through the community stakeholders and those with disabilities themselves.

OTs work in community-based rehabilitation projects as trainers and educators to help teach community members while facilitating them and developing programs.

Some examples include backpack awareness, promoting physical activity in families, creating inclusive community environments such as churches and health facilities, advocacy at government levels, conducting rallies, etc.

=== Human displacement ===
This refers to forced movement of communities by environmental or social factors which causes loss of occupational activities. This is caused by a number of factors including natural disaster, famine, armed conflict or developmental and economic changes. Occupational therapists work with these displaced persons in order to help rebuild roles, routines, self-efficacy, so that occupational imbalance, injustice, or deprivation does not occur. Occupational therapists work through community-based programs that are client-centered and culturally sensitive.

=== With older people ===
Occupational therapy is very beneficial to the older population. Therapists help older people lead more productive, active, and independent lives through a variety of methods, including the use of adaptive equipment. Occupational therapists work with older people in many varied environments, such as in their homes in the community, in hospital, and in residential care facilities to name a few. In the home environment, occupational therapists may work with the individuals to assess for hazards and to identify environmental factors that contribute to falls. Occupational therapists are often instrumental in assessing for appropriate wheelchairs for older people who may need them. In addition, therapists with specialized training in driver rehabilitation assess an individual's ability to drive using both clinical and on-the-road tests. The evaluations allow the therapist to make recommendations for adaptive equipment, training to prolong driving independence, and alternative transport options.

=== Mental health ===
During World War II, occupational therapy began to play a far bigger role in the treatment of soldiers in psychiatric hospitals run by or for the British military. Therapists found that engagement in occupation (usually crafts such as woodwork, sign writing, carpentry, etc.) was an effective intervention for increasing self-regulation and mental well-being in people with physical disabilities such as loss of limb and mental illness. In the decades since, occupational therapy has continued to advance and services in mental health now aim to promote positive mental health, prevent mental health problems, and help manage mental health challenges by providing client-centered care. According to the World Federation of Occupational Therapists (2019, p. 2), occupational therapists recognize that good mental health enables people to realize their potential, cope with life's normal stresses, work productively, and contribute to their communities". Occupational therapists acknowledge the unique identities of each individual and their lived experiences and values choice and autonomy with one's recovery journey to promote participation in meaningful occupations of everyday life. Occupational therapists address the needs of clients in all phases of mental health recovery and in all settings, ranging from acute inpatient mental health settings to community mental health settings. Occupational therapists also work with clients on a large continuum of mental health challenges, including clients with substance-use disorders, mental illness, eating disorders, stress-related challenges, trauma, and adverse experiences. Skilled interventions with clients may include:

- Self-regulation and coping strategies (e.g. mindfulness, grounding)
- Emotional awareness training and emotional regulation strategies, including advocacy
- Social emotional skills and training
- Social cognitive skills
- Training in executive functioning strategies
- Quality of life measures and awareness
- Implementation of healthy habits and routines
- Motivational interviewing
- Strategies to reduce stress
- Sensory modulation-related interventions to self-regulate
- Behavioral interventions, such as cognitive behavioral therapy (CBT) or dialectical behavioral therapy (DBT)
- Trauma-informed care
- Skills training with accommodations or compensatory strategies
- Mental health literacy
- Lifestyle redesign, a preventative occupational therapy intervention to promote wellness

=== With terminally-ill patients ===
Occupational therapy (OT) practitioners help patients with terminal illnesses and conditions by assisting them with their needs related to end-of-life support. All of the areas of a patient's life including work, play and leisure are widely affected. An occupational therapist provides various treatment modalities to help such individuals to restore or maintain their deteriorating performance components by using their remaining capabilities to give them a sense of self-importance and a measure of self-confidence. The World Federation of Occupational Therapy (WFOT) recognizes the important role OT practitioners have in end-of-life care. In working with patients who have severe health conditions, disabilities and terminal illnesses, the OT clinician will help these individuals engage in meaningful, everyday occupations, as well as exercise the right to well-being and the best quality of life despite the unavoidable conclusion to their lifecycle. An OT practitioner understands the transactional relationship that exists between the individual, environment, and occupation; so that life enhancing, ongoing performance in quality of life activities are promoted. The WFOT recognizes an optimistic presence for OT in end-of-life care with an ongoing need for advocacy and support.

=== With people experiencing chronic pain ===
Occupational therapists often work within interdisciplinary or multidisciplinary teams (professionals such as physical therapists, nurses and physicians) to help individuals with chronic pain develop active self-management strategies. An area of specific concern to occupational therapists is the usage of a patient's time but it is also common for occupational therapists to help people return to work, and to return to leisure and family activities. Occupational therapists may use a variety of interventions including biofeedback, relaxation, goal setting, problem solving, planning, and can use those tools within both group and individual settings. Therapists may work within a clinic setting, or in the community including the workplace, school, home and health care centers. Occupational therapists may assess occupational performance before and after intervention, as a measure of effectiveness and reduction in disability.

=== Models ===
Occupational therapists can work from a variety of models, both broad and discrete. Top-down approaches are considered more broad and focus on the occupation itself while taking into consideration the many contextual factors (environmental, social, cultural, etc.), in comparison to bottom-up approaches which are more narrow or discrete. These models include the Person-Environment-Occupation (PEO), Person-Environment-Occupation-Performance (PEOP), Canadian Model of Occupational Performance and Engagement (CMOP-E), Model of Human Occupation (MOHO), and Ecology of Human Performance (EHP).

=== Assessment ===
In order for an individual or group to receive occupational therapy services they must first be referred by themselves, another health care provider, or through their support system (family, friends) to receive an occupational therapy evaluation. As part of the service delivery process, the evaluation consists of the initial occupational profile followed by an analysis of occupational performance. Occupational therapy evaluations and occupational therapy assessments are important in determining an individual's skill set or deficiency. Through the occupational profile, which is a structured interview of the client, an occupational therapist can identify the client's self-perceived strengths and limitations in participating in daily occupations and help create an individualized treatment plan that addresses the occupations that are meaningful and necessary to the client. As part of the occupational profile, an occupational therapist also seeks to identify physical and social supports and barriers to participation. Occupational therapists often gather additional information by communicating with the client's support system, which may include a child's parents/guardians, a student's teacher, an adult's spouse/siblings/friends, or a senior's caretaker. The analysis of occupational performance may be gathered through standardized assessments, clinical observations of the client performing a set of tasks and activities, and analysis of the physical or social environment and context in which the client performs the occupations. Occupational therapist utilize skilled observation simultaneously with evaluation of motor and process skills and the effect on the ability of an individual to perform complex or instrumental and personal activities of daily living (ADLs). Occupational therapists are trained in the administration of standardized assessments across the lifespan from infancy to old age, although some standardized assessments require an occupational therapist to gain additional certifications to administer.

Examples of the types of assessments or skill areas occupational therapy practitioners assess include:

- Sensory processing skills
- Visual perception and visual motor skills
- gross motor and fine motor skills
- Handwriting
- Upper Limb Hand dexterity
- Cognition and intelligence
- School-based evaluations
- Developmental milestones
- Daily living tasks include dressing and eating
- Pain
- Executive functioning
- Environmental assessments
- Employment-based assessments
- Ergonomic assessments

Through the initial evaluation process, occupational therapists work with the client to establish an individualized treatment plan. Data is collected and recorded throughout the treatment process to be utilized to assess progress and guide ongoing client-centered intervention. This data is also frequently utilized for reimbursement of services. At the conclusion of therapy services, an occupational therapist will complete an outcome assessment which may include a re-evaluation.

Assessment may also be more broad such as assessing the accessibility of public spaces for all individuals. Occupational therapists can provide recommendations for building design to allow for access for all. Occupational therapists are also skilled at completing home safety assessments and altering the environment or providing accommodations for ways to complete occupations in the home and for increased safety of clients and caregivers. Occupational therapists can also complete driving assessments to determine the required accommodations in the car or the ability of an individual to safely drive. Furthermore, occupational therapists can work with whole organizations to assess their workspaces to ensure that the work demands and physical set up are conducive to safe working habits to prevent workplace injuries.

== Hand therapy ==
Occupational therapy also plays a major role in the rehabilitation and recovery of patients who have hand injuries, as well as upper and lower extremity injuries. Occupational therapists play a significant role in collaborating with Hand/Orthopedic Surgeons, a patient's employers and/or case managers in providing the best client-centered rehabilitation program. Occupational therapists treat conditions ranging from soft tissue injuries such as tennis elbow to neuropathies such as carpal tunnel syndrome. An Array of Upper Limb assessments are utilized to provide a treatment care plan that is effective and appropriate for each person and their injury. Treatment modalities such as orthosis/splints, soft braces and education are examples of the common treatment tools that an occupational therapist will use during treatment. Hand therapy is a specialized field of occupational therapy and therapists that work in this area are highly skilled and knowledgeable in upper limb anatomy.

== See also ==
- Allied health professional
- Child life specialist
- Doctor of Medicine
- Doctor of Osteopathic Medicine
- Mental health counselor
- Nonviolent communication
- Occupational science
- Occupational therapy in the United Kingdom
- Occupational therapy in India
- Psychiatrist
- Rehabilitation psychology
- Psychotherapist
- Recreational therapist
- Social worker
- Speech–language pathology
