= Shivajirao Bhosale =

Shivajirao Bhosale (Marathi: शिवाजीराव भोसले; July 15, 1927 – June 29, 2010), born in Kaledhon near SATARA, was a noted orator and thinker from Maharashtra, India. He was vice-chancellor of Marathwada University from 1988 to 1991. He was the younger brother of Babasaheb Bhosale.He has a daughter named Anjali and a son named Sanjeev. Besides them he has a daughter-in-law named Ranjana. Also he has 3 grandchildren named Aditya, Siddhi and Siddhant.

After completing a master's degree in Philosophy and a bachelor's degree in Law for a short period he was a member of the Bar Council of Satara Court and started juniorship under the supervision of his elder Brother barrister Babasaheb Bhosale. He left this profession to become principal of the Mudhoji College in Phaltan. H.H. Malojiraje Saheb was starting a college in Phaltan which was first in the rural part of Maharashtra. Shivajirao Bhosale joined this college and served here for life in the capacity of Professor and Principal. His famous books are as enlisted below( All are in Marathi) :

1. Muktigatha Mahamanavachi
2. Dipstambh
3. Yakshprashna
4. Prerana
5. Katha Vaktrutwachi
6. Jagar Khand -1
7. Jagar KHand -2
8. Hitsgoshti
9. Deshodeshiche Darshnik
10. Jivan vedh
11. Swami Vivekananda Charitra Chintan

[3]
