= Occupational therapy in India =

The profession of occupational therapy was established in India in 1950. Despite its 70 years of existence in India, the profession gained momentum in the healthcare sector of India mainly in the past two decades or so.

== Beginning years ==
The first department of occupational therapy (OT) was established at the King Edward Memorial Hospital (KEM) in Mumbai, India in 1950. The founder of the ‘OT profession in India’ as well as the ‘first school of OT in India/Asia’ was Mrs. Kamala V. Nimbkar [1] [nee Elizabeth Lundy]. Mrs. Nimbhkar was a social activist who spent her early 30s at Mahatma Gandhi’s Sabarmati Ashram. She became interested in OT when she came across an article written by Ms. Helen Willard, a notable occupational therapist in the United States. Dr. Nimbkar went to the US to study OT at the Philadelphia School of OT at the age of 45. After passing the OT board exam in February 1948 she returned to India and persuaded the KEM Hospital Administration to start the OT department.

Mrs. Nimbkar was also the founder and first president of the All-India Occupational Therapists Association, which is one of the founding member organizations of the World Federation of Occupational Therapists (WFOT). Mrs. Nimbkar was also the first editor of the Indian Journal of Occupational Therapy in its beginning years. Mrs. Nimbkar retired in 1957 from the Occupational Therapy School at KEM Hospital and established the second OT school at Nagpur in 1958.

== 1960–1980s ==
Subsequent decades saw the emergence of a few OT diploma educational programs in the states of Bihar [Bihar College of Physiotherapy and Occupational Therapy - 1966], New Delhi [PDU Institute for the Physically Handicapped - 1960; College of Occupational Therapy, AIIMS - 1971], Tamil Nadu [Occupational Therapy School at Christian Medical College - 1969], and Uttar Pradesh [Occupational Therapy School at King George's Medical School - 1970; Occupational Therapy School at Institute of Engineering and Technology - 1981].

== Age of notable growth ==
Occupational therapy's stature began to grow when diploma level educational programs transitioned to baccalaureate level programs in late 1980s. The last decade of the 20th century was a golden decade for OT in India as 13 new baccalaureate level OT programs were established in India between 1990 and 2000. Many schools were established in Maharashtra and Tamil Nadu. The number of OT educational programs continued to rise in early 2000. The length of the baccalaureate degree was increased from 3.5 years to 4.5 years in the 1990s. Institutions also began to offer OT at a master's level (ranging 2–3 years) beginning the1990s. Since 2000s, doctoral level [PhD] OT degrees are also being offered in India. Post-baccalaureate OT education is available with specialization tracks in hand therapy, mental health, pediatrics, neurology, geriatrics, women's health and orthopedics among others.

The demand for OT professionals in India has gathered momentum in the past decade. Indian OT professionals work in a variety of practice settings including government and private hospitals, multi-specialty hospitals, rehabilitation centers, non-governmental organizations, special schools, outpatient clinics, and academic institutions. Many OTs in India run their own outpatient clinics. Due to the excessive demand for OT professionals all over the world, graduates of OT programs in India comprise a notable part of the Indian diaspora.

== Entry-level requirements ==
The entry to professional practice is a baccalaureate (bachelor's) degree in occupational therapy (B.O.T./ B.O.Th.) of 5 years duration including internship. Under the purview of the National Council of Allied and Health Professions (NCAHP), admission to the BOT/ BOTh programs in India is through the National Eligibility cum Entrance Test (NEET) as required for other professional medical degree programs such as MBBS and BDS. One must also fulfil other applicable regulatory requirements such as obtaining a registration certificate from the council (if one is established in the state) before starting to practice. Currently, more than 30 schools offer OT courses in India.

== Occupational therapy schools in India ==
A few well-known institutes that run BOT courses in India are as follows. The first four are National Institutes:

1. National Institute for Locomotor Disabilities, Kolkata, West Bengal
2. Swami Vivekanand National Institute of Rehabilitation Training and Research (SVNIRTAR), Cuttack, Odisha
3. Pt. Deen Dayal Upadhyay Institute for Physically Handicapped, Delhi
4. NIEPMD, Chennai, Tamil Nadu
5. Sri Ramachandra University, Chennai, Tamil Nadu
6. JKKMMRF College of Occupational therapy, Tamil Nadu
7. School of Allied Health Sciences, Manipal, Karnataka, India
8. Seth Gordhandas Sunderdas Medical College and King Edward VII Memorial Hospital, Parel East, Mumbai, Maharashtra, India
9. Topiwala National Medical College and BYL Nair Charitable Hospital, Mumbai Central, Mumbai, Maharashtra, India
10. Christian Medical College, Vellore
11. Government Medical College, Nagpur, Maharashtra, India
12. KMCH College of Occupational Therapy, Coimbatore
13. Dr. D. Y. Patil College of Occupational Therapy, Navi Mumbai, Maharashtra, India
14. Dr. D. Y. Patil College of Occupational Therapy, Kolhapur, Maharashtra, India
15. School Of Occupational Therapy, Faculty of Allied Health Science, Jamia Hamdard University, New Delhi
16. Lokmanya Tilak Municipal Medical College and Lokmanya Tilak Municipal General Hospital, Sion, Mumbai, Maharashtra, India
17. Jaipur Occupational Therapy College & Hospital, Jaipur, Rajasthan, India
18. Santosh Medical College, Ghaziabad
19. Indore Institute of Medical Sciences, Indore, Madhya Pradesh, India
20. Ahmedabad Institute of Medical Sciences, Ahmedabad, Gujarat, India
21. SRM College of Occupational Therapy, Chennai, Tamil Nadu, India
22. NIMS University, Shobha Nagar, Jaipur-303121
23. Annamalai University, Annamalai Nagar, Tamil Nadu 608 002
24. Saveetha University, Chennai, Tamil Nadu
25. Meenakshi Academy of Higher Education and Research, Chennai, Tamil Nadu
26. Smt.K. P. Patel Institute of Physiotherapy and Occupational Therapy. Anand, Gujarat
27. Allied Health Sciences, Goa Medical College, Goa, India
28. Mahatma Gandhi Institute of Allied Health and Sciences (MIAHS), Indore
29. School of Medical and Allied Health Sciences, Brainware University, Kolkata, West Bengal
30. Acharya Institute of Allied Health Sciences, RGUHS University, Bangalore, Karnataka

== Regulatory Control ==
Occupational therapy is an autonomous health profession regulated in India by the Occupational Therapy Council under the National Council of Allied and Health Professions (NCAHP) beginning 2025. The entry to professional practice is a baccalaureate (bachelor's) degree in occupational therapy of 5 years duration including internship. Under the purview of the NCAHP, admission to the BOT/ BOTh programs in India is through the National Eligibility cum Entrance Test (NEET) as required for other professional medical degree programs such as MBBS and BDS.

Qualified occupational therapists after completing the Bachelor of Occupational Therapy (BOT/ BOTh) degree are allowed the honorific prefix of "Dr." along with the suffix of "OT" (for example: Dr. John Smith, OT"). The All-India Occupational Therapists' Association offers voluntary registration through its Academic Council of Occupational Therapy Education. The State of Maharashtra and the Union Territory of Delhi legally require OT practitioners to register themselves with the respective councils (The Delhi Council for Physiotherapy and Occupational Therapy & Maharashtra State Occupational and Physiotherapy Council).
