= Phaltan =

City in India

- Town
- Location in Maharashtra, India
- Coordinates: 17.98°N 74.43°E
- Country: India
- State: Maharashtra
- Division: Pune Division
- District: Satara
- Founder: Nimbraj Parmar

Government
  - Type: Municipal corporation
  - Body: Municipal council

Area
  - Total: 10.28 km^{2} (3.97 sq mi)
- Elevation: 568 m (1,864 ft)

Population (2011)
  - Total: 52,118
  - Density: 5,070/km^{2} (13,130/sq mi)
- Demonym: Phaltankar
- Time zone: UTC+5:30 (IST)
- PIN: 415523
- Telephone code: 02166
- Vehicle registration: MH53
- Sex ratio: Male 1000 / Female 986 ♂/♀
- Website: https://www.satara.gov.in

Phaltan is a city, tehsil and municipal council in the Satara district in the Indian state of Maharashtra. The city is about 59 kilometres (37 mi) northeast of the city of Satara and about 110 km from Pune.

== History ==
Phaltan was one of the non-salute Maratha princely states of British India, under the central division of the Bombay presidency. It measured 397 square miles (1,028 km^{2}) in area. According to the 1901 census, the population decreased by 31% to 45,739; the town's population was 9,512. In 1901, the state had revenue estimated at £13,000, and paid a tribute of £640 to the British Raj.

== Geography ==
Phaltan has an average elevation of 568 meters (1,863 feet).

Phaltan's climate is an inland climate of Maharashtra. The temperature ranges from 15 to 45 °C (59 to 113 °F). Summer in Phaltan is comparatively hot and dry when compared to neighboring inland cities. Maximum temperatures exceed 40 °C (104 °F) every summer and typically range between 38–45 °C (100–113 °F). Lows during this season are around 25–28 °C (77–82 °F).

The city receives less rainfall from June to September, and it has been declared as a drought-prone place by the government. Phaltan sometimes does not get rainfall during the rainy season.

Winter starts in Phaltan from November to February. The winter temperatures are significantly higher compared to other cities in Maharashtra such as Pune and Nashik. Lowest temperatures range from 14–16 °C (57–61 °F), while highests are in the range of 29–32 °C (84–90 °F). Humidity is low in this season.

Phaltan crosses a drought-prone area; a dry area is present to the south and south-west of Phaltan, a dry area begins. Water for drinking and irrigation is provided by the Veer Dam on the Nira river.

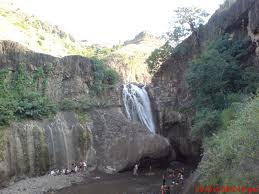
Dhumalwadi Waterfall

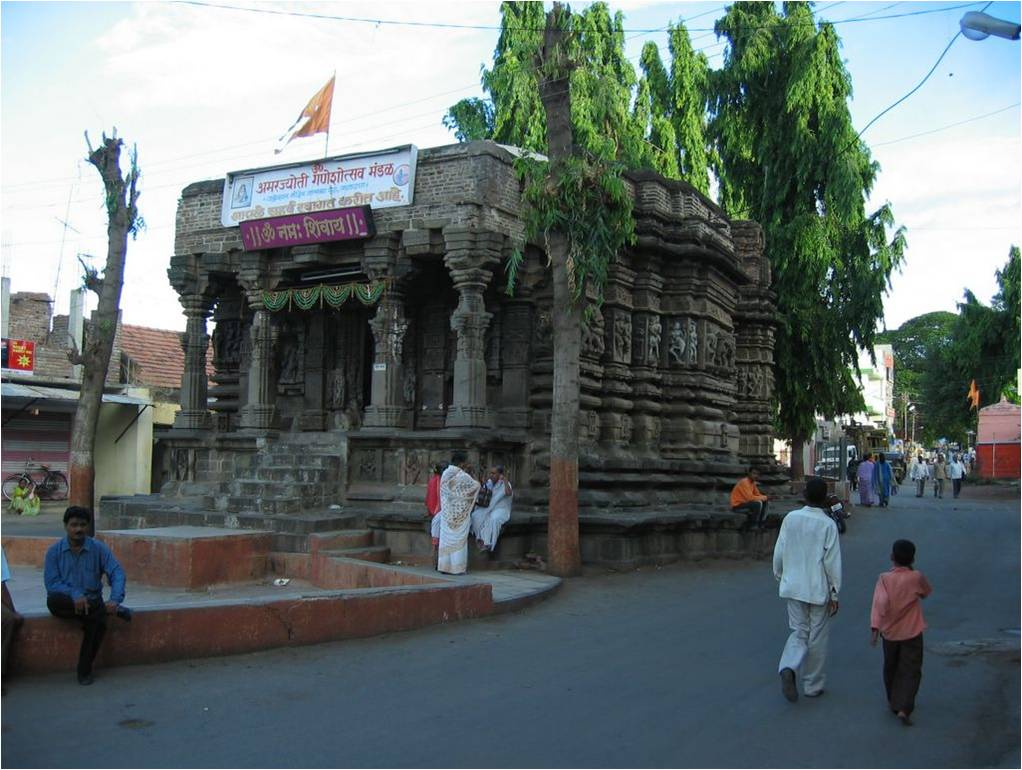
Jabareshwar Mandir

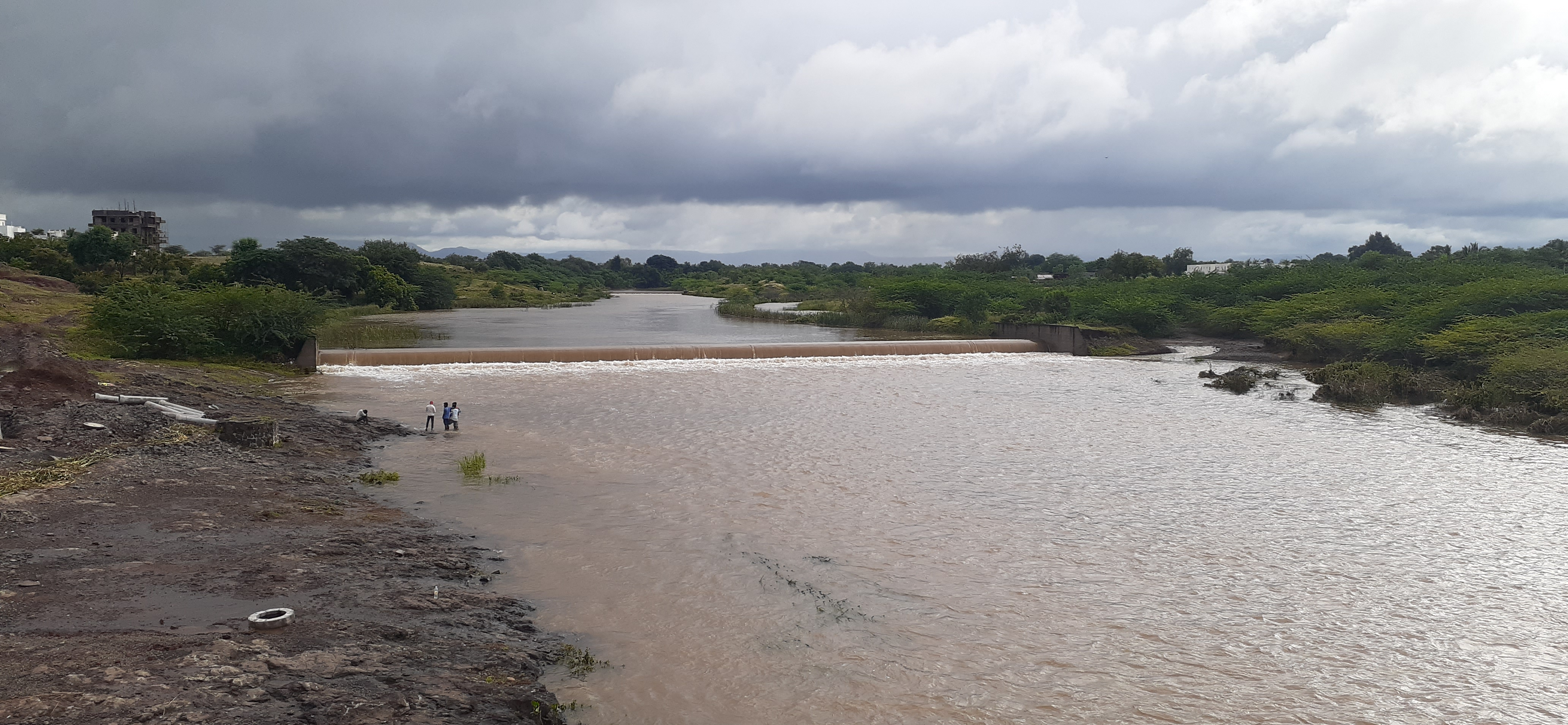
Banganga river near phaltan

== Demographics ==
According to the 2001 Census of India, Phaltan had a population of 60,172. Males constituted 51% of the population and females 49%. Phaltan has an average literacy rate of 75%, higher than the national average of 59.5%: male literacy is 80%, and female literacy is 70%. In Phaltan, 12% of the population was under six years of age.

== Culture ==
Phaltan is the birthplace of Chakrapani Prabhu, whom the followers of Mahanubhava Sampradaya consider an avatar among the 5 Krishnas.

== Villages ==
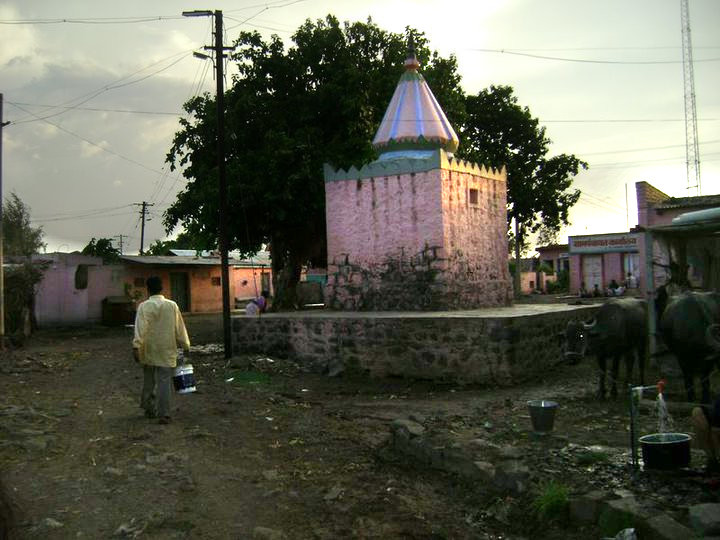
Bhilkati

Villages in the tehsil include:

- Bhilkati (18°1′10″N 74°22′26″E), where the main activity of the community is farming.
- Girvi is a village located at southeast of phaltan.It is at the base of varugad fort.

== Industry ==
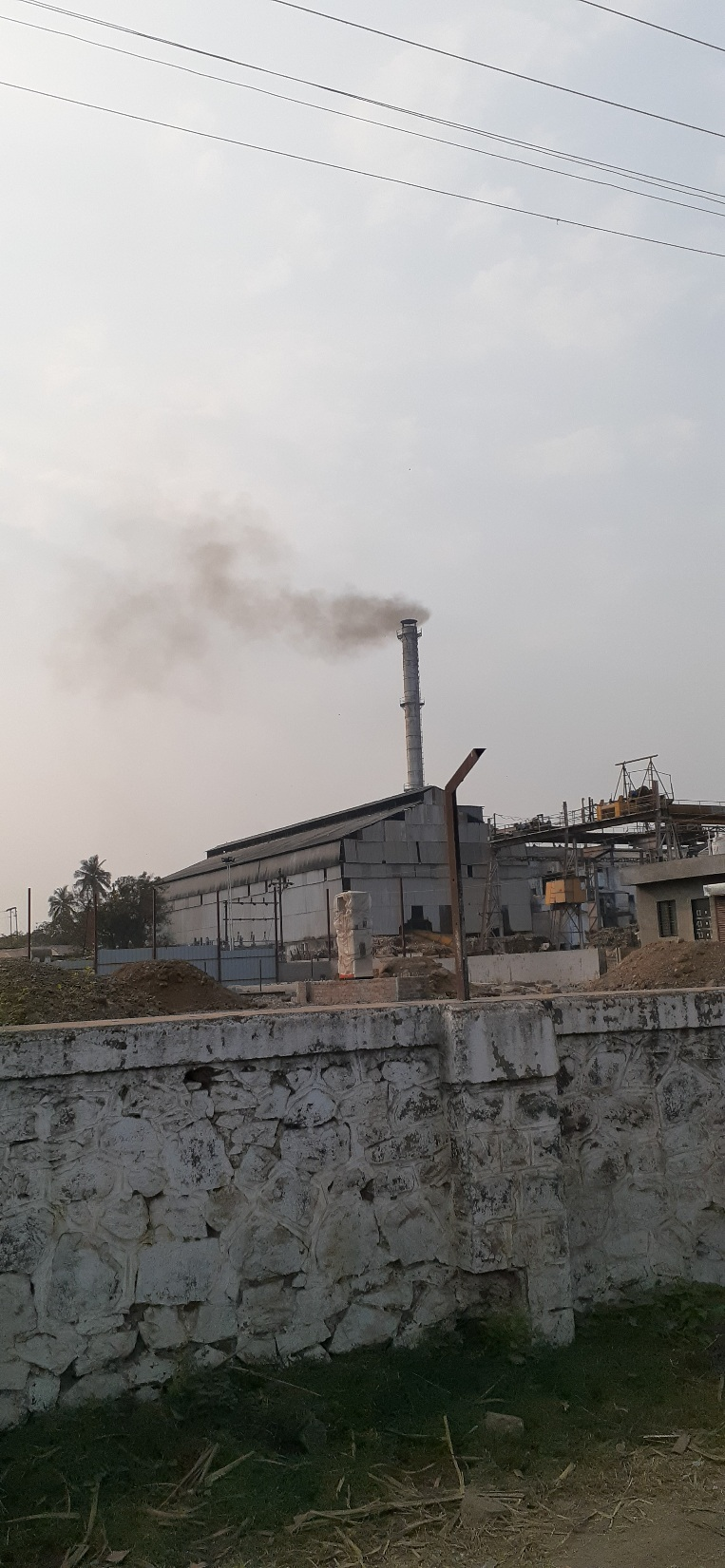
Cummins manufacturing plant

As a tehsil, Phaltan has two sugar factories: New Phaltan Sugar Works Ltd., Sakharwadi and Shri Ram Sahakari Sakhar Karkhana Pvt. Ltd., Phaltan.

Cummins India Ltd. has its 300-acre "mega-site" plant in Phaltan, which is being used to manufacture engines.

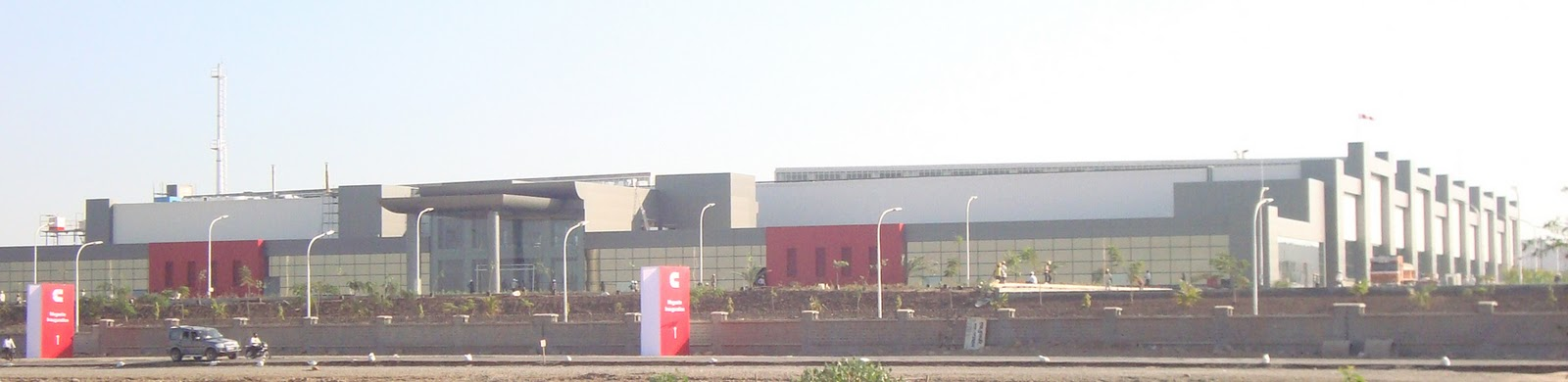
Cummins India Ltd. in Phaltan MIDC

== Education ==
The Nimbkar Agricultural Research Institute is located in Phaltan. It focuses on agriculture, renewable energy, animal husbandry and sustainable development. Its work on energy self-sufficient tehsils (which became a national policy) was based on the extensive research on biomass availability in Phaltan Taluka.

== In popular culture ==
Phaltan is best known as the geospatial basis for the contemporary storyline of the 2010 Priyadarshan film Khatta Meetha in which Akshay Kumar's character Sachin Tichkule is a local native of the town, with the Tichkule family shown to be descendants of the village's royal family.

== Notable residents ==
- Sai Bhonsale
- Shivajirao Bhosale
- B. V. Nimbkar, Padma Shri awardee 2006
- Nandini Nimbkar
- Anil K. Rajvanshi, Padma Shri awardee 2022

== See also ==
- Upalve
