= Anil K. Rajvanshi =

Indian academic

Anil Rajvanshi
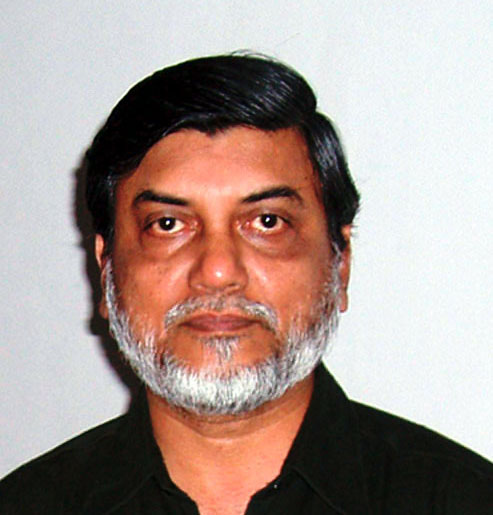
- Born: Lucknow
- Education: University of Florida; Indian Institute of Technology
- Known for: Directing NARI research in rural development
- Spouse: Nandini Nimbkar
- Awards: Jamnalal Bajaj Award (2001), Solar Hall of Fame (1998), Distinguished Alumnus Award University of Florida (2014), Distinguished Alumnus Award IIT Kanpur (2022), Padma Shri (2022)
- Scientific career
- Fields: Engineering
- Workplaces: Nimbkar Agricultural Research Institute (NARI); University of Florida
- Doctoral advisor: Erich Farber

Anil Kumar Rajvanshi (born 1 September 1950) is an Indian mechanical engineer and researcher whose work has focused on renewable energy, rural technology and sustainable development. He is associated with the Nimbkar Agricultural Research Institute (NARI), a research institution based in Phaltan, Maharashtra, where he has served as director since 1981. His research has addressed the application of engineering and renewable energy technologies to rural needs, including agricultural residue-based energy production, biofuels, cooking and lighting systems, electric mobility and water purification.

Rajvanshi's professional career has centred on the use of advanced engineering and scientific research to address practical problems in rural communities. His work at NARI has involved developing technologies suited to locally available resources, particularly agricultural residues, biomass and renewable fuels. He received the Jamnalal Bajaj Award in 2001 for the application of science and technology for rural development and the Padma Shri in 2022 in the field of science and engineering.

== Early life and education ==
Rajvanshi was born on 1 September 1950 and grew up in Lucknow, Uttar Pradesh. He studied mechanical engineering at the Indian Institute of Technology Kanpur, obtaining a bachelor's degree in 1972 and a master's degree in 1974. He subsequently moved to the United States and completed a PhD in mechanical engineering at the University of Florida in 1979, where he worked on solar energy research under the supervision of Erich Farber.

After completing his doctorate, Rajvanshi taught at the University of Florida for approximately two and a half years. He returned to India in 1981 and joined the Nimbkar Agricultural Research Institute in Phaltan, Maharashtra.

== Research and career ==
=== Rural technology and sustainable development ===
Rajvanshi's work has focused on adapting engineering research to the requirements of rural communities. At NARI, he helped develop a model of research and development in which a rural-based institution undertook scientific and technological work on energy, agriculture and other development-related problems.

His approach emphasised the use of locally available resources and the development of technologies that could be manufactured, maintained and used in rural settings. The research areas included renewable energy-based cooking and lighting, biomass gasification, agricultural waste utilisation, renewable fuel production, water purification and electric transport.

In its citation for the 2001 Jamnalal Bajaj Award, the foundation recognised Rajvanshi's work in demonstrating how scientific and technological research could be conducted in a rural institution and applied to rural development. The citation referred to technologies developed at NARI, including ethanol production from sweet sorghum, improved lanterns and electric cycle rickshaws.

=== Renewable energy and biomass ===
An important part of Rajvanshi's research has concerned the conversion of agricultural residues into useful energy. His work included the development of biomass gasification systems using materials such as sugarcane leaves and bagasse. These systems were designed to convert agricultural waste into combustible gas for thermal and electricity-generation applications.

His research on gasification was reported in scientific journals, including Biomass and Biomass and Bioenergy. A paper by R. M. Jorapur and Rajvanshi examined the development of a sugarcane-leaf gasifier for electricity generation.

Rajvanshi also worked on the production of ethanol from sweet sorghum. The research investigated the use of the crop as a renewable feedstock for fuel production and the simultaneous utilisation of its agricultural products. NARI's work included the development of processes for producing ethanol, syrup and other value-added products from sweet sorghum.

The institute's research in sweet sorghum and safflower was discussed in a 2018 report by Hindustan Times, which described the development and wider introduction of the sweet sorghum hybrid Madhura and its potential applications in ethanol production.

=== Cooking and lighting technologies ===
Rajvanshi's research at NARI also addressed the availability of affordable cooking and lighting technologies in rural areas. The institute developed improved lanterns, including the pressurised Noorie lantern, which could operate using different fuels, including kerosene and ethanol.

Research on ethanol as a cooking and lighting fuel explored the possibility of using an agricultural product as an alternative energy source in rural households. NARI subsequently developed the Lanstove, a combined cooking and lighting appliance. These technologies formed part of a wider effort to improve energy access through locally available renewable resources.

=== Electric mobility ===
In the mid-1990s, Rajvanshi and his colleagues at NARI undertook research into electrically assisted cycle rickshaws. The project explored ways of reducing the physical effort required by cycle-rickshaw operators while retaining the practical advantages of a relatively inexpensive three-wheeled vehicle.

The institute's work included a feasibility project on electric cycle rickshaws undertaken from 1995, with a technical report published in 1997. The design and subsequent development work were part of NARI's wider research into affordable electric mobility. A fairly detailed publication on e-rickshaw has been published.

=== Water and environmental technologies ===
Rajvanshi's earlier scientific research included solar distillation, desalination and the condensation of atmospheric moisture as possible sources of freshwater. His research papers on these subjects appeared in journals including Solar Energy and Desalination during the late 1970s and early 1980s.

His subsequent work at NARI also included the development of water purification and other technologies intended for rural applications. These activities reflected the institute's broader interest in applying renewable energy and engineering to problems of rural infrastructure and environmental sustainability.

== Philosophy of technology and development ==
Alongside his engineering research, Rajvanshi has written about the relationship between technology, spirituality and human well-being. His writings advocate combining technological development with ethical and philosophical considerations, drawing in part on Indian philosophical traditions.

He has described his approach through the formulation "Spirituality + Technology = Sustainability + Happiness". His books on these subjects include Nature of Human Thought, Exploring the Mind of God and Deep Science in Ancient Indian Philosophical Thought.

These writings address questions concerning consciousness, human thought, ancient philosophical ideas and their possible relationships with modern scientific concepts. They represent a separate intellectual interest alongside his engineering and rural development work.

== Awards and recognition ==
Rajvanshi has received several awards and institutional recognitions for his work in renewable energy and rural development, including:

Rajvanshi has been inducted into the Solar Hall of Fame (1998). He has received the Jamnalal Bajaj Award in 2001, the Federation of Indian Chamber of Commerce and Industry (FICCI) award in 2002 and an Energy Globe Award in the AIR category in 2004. In 2009 he received the Globe Award for Sustainability Research. In 2014, he became the first Indian to receive the Distinguished Alumnus Award from the University of Florida. He has been given the Distinguished Alumnus Award, 2022 by Indian Institute of Technology Kanpur. In 2022 he was given one of the highest civilian award of India Padma Shri.

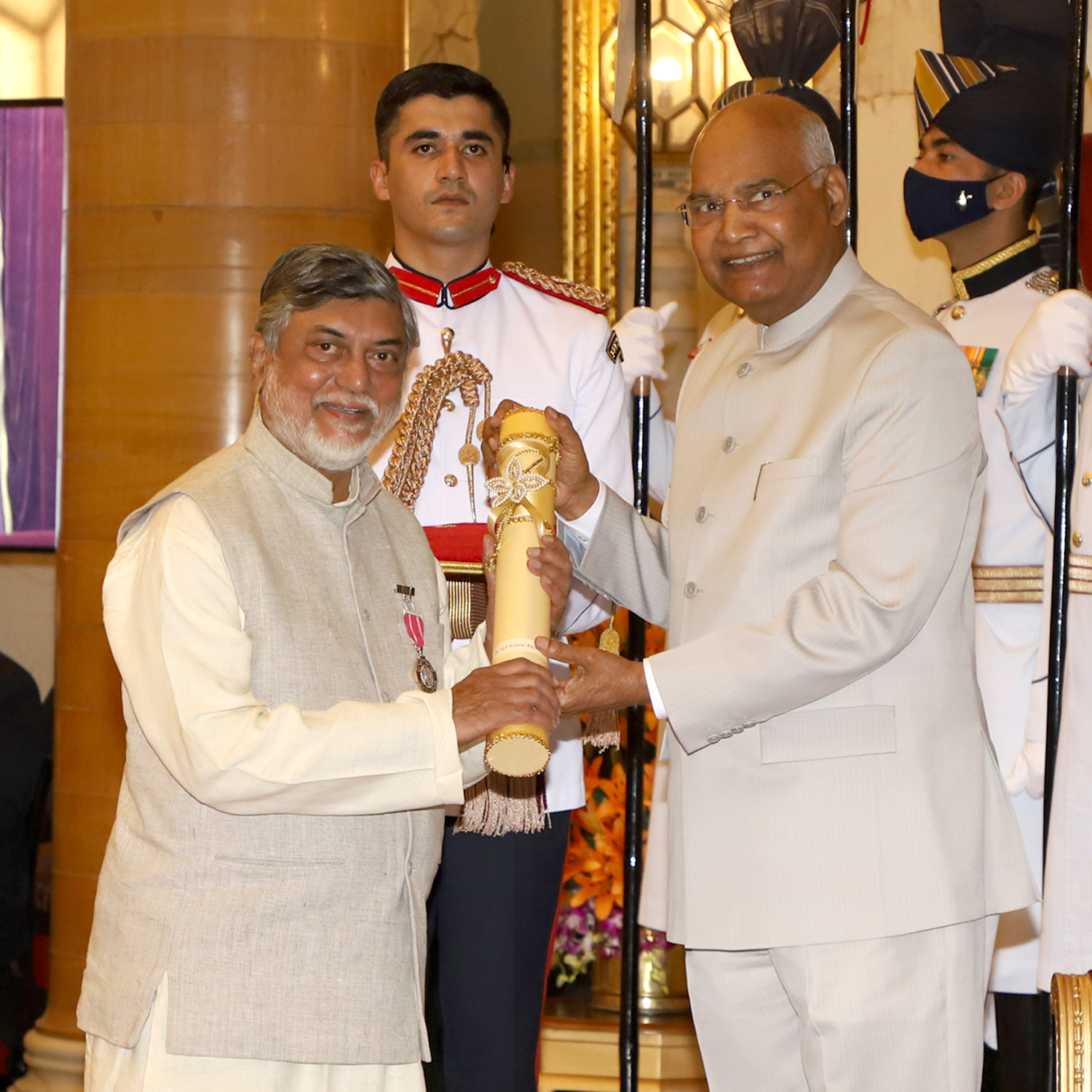
Padma Shri to Anil Rajvanshi

== Selected books and writings ==
- 1970s America - an Indian Student's Journey
- Nature of Human Thought
- Romance of Innovation - A human interest story of doing R&D in rural setting
- A Life of an ordinary Indian - An exercise in self-importance
- Exploring the Mind of God
- Exploring Deep Science in Patanjali Yoga Sutras
- What is Thought?-Neurobiological and Physical Basis of Its Production, Transmission and Interaction with Matter
- Deep Science in Ancient Indian Philosophical Thought

Rajvanshi is a regular blogger for Times of India (Speaking Tree), Huffington Post, Thrive Global and South Asia Monitor. He is also a regular podcaster. Rajvanshi has published books and essays on engineering, rural development, technology and spirituality. His works include:

== See also ==
- List of Indian writers
