= Nimbkar Agricultural Research Institute =

Research and Development institute in Maharashtra, India

Nimbkar Agricultural Research Institute (NARI) is an Indian non-governmental organization and non-profit research and development institute in Phaltan, Maharashtra. NARI undertakes research and development in the fields of agriculture, renewable energy, animal husbandry and sustainable development. B. V. Nimbkar founded the institute in 1968 and remained its president until 1990. Currently, Dr. Nandini Nimbkar is the president and Dr. Anil K. Rajvanshi is the director of the institute.

== President ==
Nandini Nimbkar started at NARI as a researcher. She became director and then replaced her father in 1990 as president of the institute. B.V. Nimbkar founded NARI in 1968 and remained its president until 1990. Nandini Nimkbar has 37 years of experience in agriculture research and was also a member of the senate and academic council of Shivaji University. She has overseen the setup of a large sweet sorghum breeding program at NARI. Dr. Nimbkar has been recently nominated by Ministry of Agriculture (India), Government of India, as a member of the Research Advisory Committee to National Institute of Abiotic Stress Management (NIASM), Baramati, India.

=== Education ===
- Bachelor's degree from the University of Pune in 1974.
- Master's degree in agronomy from the University of Florida in 1977.
- Doctorate in Agronomy from the University of Florida in 1981.
- Honored as one of the 47 most distinguished alumnae of University of Florida in 1997.

== Agriculture ==
NARI has developed various safflower varieties and hybrids for both high oil content and petals. NARI is one of the research centers included in the All India Coordinated Research Project on Oilseeds for irrigated safflower under the aegis of the Indian Council of Agricultural Research (ICAR, New Delhi). The institute has developed high-yield varieties and hybrids of cotton, sunflower, safflower, and sweet sorghum (named Madhura), as well as technology for producing ethanol, jaggery and syrup from sweet sorghum.

The Animal Husbandry Division (AHD) of Nimbkar Agricultural Research Institute (NARI) was established in 1990. The chief aim of the AHD is to genetically improve local goats and sheep, and to improve the management of these animals on which the livelihoods of many rural people are dependent.

== Renewable energy ==
NARI's Work in this field has been done mostly in solar and biomass energy and recently in sustainable and environmental friendly transport systems, ethanol lighting/cooking and handicapped rickshaws.

- NARI has developed an efficient multifuel lantern called Noorie for rural areas.
- A complete technology for producing ethanol from sweet sorghum has been developed at the institute. A number of high ethanol yielding varieties have also been produced.
- NARI has developed a stove running on 50% (w/w) and more ethanol/water concentration.
- The gasification technology for thermal applications has been developed at NARI, including technology for the gasification of loose leafy biomass fuels like sugarcane leaves and bagasse, sweet sorghum stalks and bagasse.
- Technology to increase the survival of tree seedlings in arid regions has been developed. Solar energy is used to collect water from the soil, which is then fed to the seedlings.
- In the late 1990s NARI pioneered the development of electric cycle rickshaws in India.
- NARI has developed a lantern cum stove running on ethanol for rural areas.
- Recently NARI has extended the ethanol Lanstove concept to that running on kerosene.
- NARI has recently developed a very low-cost water purification system using solar energy.

== Awards ==
- B. V. Nimbkar was awarded the Padma Shri in 2006.
- NARI was given the 2007 CSIR award for S&T for rural development for its sheep breeding work
- NARI was awarded the Globe Award for its work in ethanol lantern cum stove (2009)
- Dr. Anil K. Rajvanshi was awarded the Padma Shri in 2022
