= Umabai Dabhade =

Indian noblewoman

- Born: Unknown; Abhona, Nashik, India
- Died: 28 November 1753; Pune, Maharashtra, Maratha Empire, India
- Spouse: Khande Rao Dabhade
- Issue: Trimbak Rao Dabhade
- Clan: Dabhade
- Father: Devrao Thoke Deshmukh

Umabai Dabhade (died 1753) was a prominent member of the Maratha Dabhade clan. The members of her family held the hereditary title senapati (commander-in-chief), and controlled several territories in Gujarat. After the deaths of her husband Khande Rao and her son Trimbak Rao, she exercised executive powers while her minor son Yashwant Rao remained the titular senapati. Her unsuccessful rebellion against Peshwa Balaji Baji Rao resulted in the downfall of the Dabhade family.

== Early life ==
Umabai Dabhade was the daughter of Abhonkar Devrao Thoke Deshmukh. She married Khanderao Dabhade, and was the youngest of his three wives. The couple had three sons (Trimbakrao, Yashwantrao, and Sawai Baburao) and three daughters (Shahbai, Durgabai, and Anandibai). In 1710, Umabai built 470 steps on the hill to reach the temple of the goddess Saptashringi near Nashik.

== Rise as the Dabhade matriarch ==
Umabai's husband Khande Rao was the Maratha senapati (commander-in-chief) under Chhattrapati Shahu. After his death in 1729, their son Trimbak Rao Dabhade became the senapati. The Dabhades had the rights to collect taxes (chauth and sardeshmukhi) from Gujarat province and it was an important source of revenue for them. When Shahu's Peshwa (prime-minister) Bajirao I decided to take over tax collection from Gujarat, the Dabhades rebelled against the Chhattrapati and the Peshwa. Bajirao defeated and killed Trimbak Rao at the Battle of Dabhoi in 1731.

After the death of her husband and her son, Umabai became the matriarch of the Dabhade family. Chhatrapati Shahu granted all of Trimbak Rao's assets and titles (including senapati) to her minor son Yashwant Rao. The Peshwa allowed them to retain control of Gujarat, on the condition that they would remit half of the revenues to his treasury. As he grew up, Yashwant Rao became addicted to alcohol and opium, and the Dabhades' lieutenant Damaji Rao Gaekwad increased his power.

== Rebellion against the Peshwa ==
Umabai pretended reconciliation with Peshwa Bajirao, but always maintained a grudge against him for killing her son. Under her, the Dabhades never actually remitted half of the revenues to Shahu's treasury, but Shahu did not want to take any extreme measures against a grieving widow and a mother who had lost her son. Peshwa Bajirao I died in 1740, and Chhattrapati Shahu in 1749. The new Chhattrapati Rajaram II and his Peshwa Balaji Baji Rao faced a severe financial crunch. As a result, Peshwa Balaji decided to subdue the Dabhades and force them to remit money to the Chhattrapati's treasury. Umabai unsuccessfully petitioned to the Peshwa, requesting him to release the Dabhades from the covenant that required them to share revenues with the Chhattrapati.

Tarabai, the former Maratha Queen, also held a grudge against the Peswha. She approached Umabai to forge an alliance against the Peshwa. The two women met in 1750, and Umabai promised to support her if the Peshwa refused to release the Dabhades from the covenant. On 1 October 1750, Tarabai and Umabai met again at the temple of Shambhu Mahadev, where Tarabai may have instigated her to rebel against the Peshwa. On 20 October 1750, Umabai asked her agent Yado Mahadev Nirgude to make a final appeal to the Peshwa, to release the Dabhades from the revenue-sharing covenant. Peshwa Balaji rejected the appeal and declared that he wanted the Dabhades to remit money to the Chhatrapati's treasury immediately. Umabai was still unwilling to rebel, and sought a personal meeting with the Peshwa. The two met at Alandi on 22 November. At this meeting Umabai argued that the covenant had been unfairly imposed by force, and was therefore, not binding. The Peshwa refused to accept this as a valid argument, and demanded half of the revenues collected from Gujarat.

When Balaji Baji Rao left for the Mughal frontier, Tarabai imprisoned Chhatrapati Rajaram II on 24 November 1750. In Tarabai's support, Umabai dispatched a force of Marathi and Gujarati soldiers led by her lieutenant Damaji Gaekwad to help Tarabai. After initial successes against the Peshwa loyalists in March 1751, Gaekwad was trapped in a gorge in the Krishna River valley. As his soldiers deserted him, he was forced to seek a peace agreement with the Peshwa. The Peshwa demanded half of Gujarat's territories in addition to a war indemnity of ₹ 25,00,000. Damaji refused to sign an agreement, stating that he was only a subordinate, and asked Peshwa to consult Umabai. On 30 April, the Peshwa launched a surprise evening attack on Gaekwad's camp, which surrendered without resistance.

In May 1751, the Peshwa arrested Damaji Gaekwad and his relatives, and sent them to Pune. Shortly after, Umabai, Yashwant Rao, and other members of the Dabhade family were also arrested. They were deprived of their jagirs as well as their hereditary title senapati. In March 1752, Gaekwad agreed to abandon Dabhades in favour of the Peshwa, who made him the Maratha chief of Gujarat. Gaekwad agreed to provide the Dabhade family an annual maintenance expense.

== Death ==
After their arrest and Gaekwad's subsequent alliance with the Peshwa, the Dabhades lost their power and much of their wealth. Umabai died on 28 November 1753 at Nadgemodi in Pune. Her samadhi (tomb) is situated at the "Shrimant Sarsenapati Dabhade Shri Baneshwar Mandir" in Talegaon Dabhade.

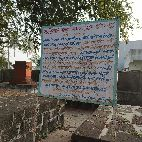
Umabai Tomb
