= Chimaji Appa =

Indian mililtary commander

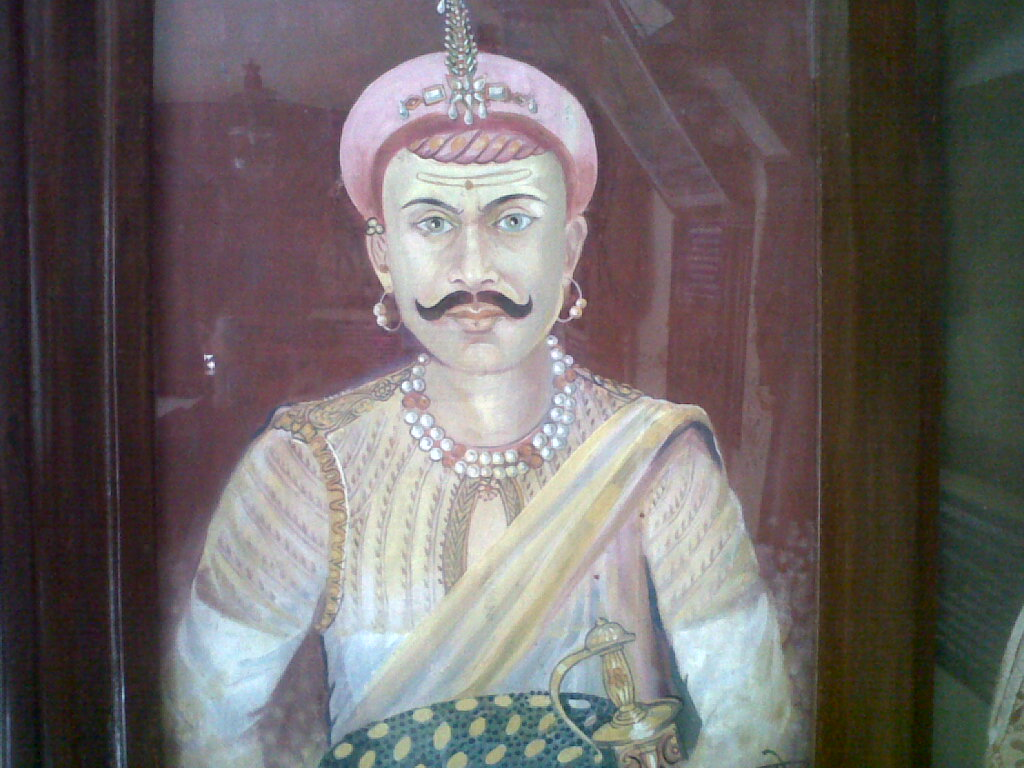
- Painting of Chimaji Ballal Peshwa near Parvati temple, part of the Peshwa Memorial atop Parvati in Pune
- Born: c. 1707; Pune, Maratha Empire (modern day Maharashtra, India)
- Died: 17 December 1740 (aged 32–33); Pune, Maratha Confederacy (modern day Maharashtra, India)
- Occupations: Commander of Maratha forces (in some missions), Deputy Peshwa (unofficial), Chief Strategic Advisor, Jagirdar (nominal), Panditrao and Health Minister
- Spouse: Rakhmabai Pethe
- Children: Sadashivrao Bhau
- Father: Balaji Vishwanath
- Relatives: Baji Rao I (brother); Balaji Baji Rao (nephew); Raghunathrao (nephew); Shamsher Bahadur I (nephew)
- Military career
- Allegiance: Maratha Empire
- Branch: Maratha Army
- Rank: Sardar
- Conflicts: Battle of Jaitpur; Battle of Dabhoi; Battle of Vasai; Battle of Bhopal; Battle of Mandsaur; Battle of Amjhera; Capture of Belapur castle; Siege of Aurangabad; Capture of Thane; Capture of Goa; Bajirao's Konkan Campaign; Siege of Thane

Chimaji Balaji Bhat (c. 1707 – 17 December 1740), born as Antaji and popularly known as Chimaji Appa, was an Indian statesman and military commander of the Maratha Empire. He was the younger brother of Baji Rao I and the second son of Balaji Vishwanath, the first hereditary Peshwa of the Maratha Empire. Known for his strategic skill, disciplined leadership, and administrative foresight, Chimaji played a key role in consolidating Maratha authority in western and central India during the early 18th century.

Chimaji Appa took part in several significant military campaigns, including the Peshwa’s expeditions in Gujarat, Malwa, and Bundelkhand. He distinguished himself in the Battle of Dabhoi (1731) and the Battle of Bundelkhand (1732), contributing to the expansion of Maratha influence northward. His most celebrated achievement, however, was the campaign against the Portuguese in the Konkan region, culminating in the decisive capture of the Vasai Fort on 16 May 1739. The victory at Vasai ended more than two centuries of Portuguese dominance north of Goa and marked a turning point in Maratha control of the western coast of India.

Following the successful conclusion of the Vasai campaign, Chimaji Appa’s health deteriorated, and he died on 17 December 1740 at the age of about 33. He is remembered as one of the most capable and principled commanders of the Maratha Empire, a loyal ally of his brother Baji Rao I, and a key figure in the rise of Maratha power during the empire’s expansionist phase.

== Gujarat campaign ==
When Trimbak Rao Dabhade, the son of Khanderao Dabhade, refused to share with the Peshwa the rights of collecting chauth and sardeshmukhi tributes due to Chhatrapati Shahu I, it led to open rivalry between the Peshwa and the Dabhade clan, who held hereditary control over Maratha interests in Gujarat. In 1730, Peshwa Baji Rao I dispatched Chimaji Appa to Gujarat to compel the Mughal governor of Surat, Sarbuland Khan, to recognize Shahu’s right to levy the chauth. Acting under Baji Rao’s orders, Chimaji successfully imposed the tax, claiming half of the revenues from the Gujarat Subah as the Maratha share.

The conflict between the Peshwa and the Dabhades eventually culminated in the Battle of Dabhoi in 1731. Chimaji Appa served as one of the principal commanders in Baji Rao’s army during the engagement. The battle ended with the defeat and death of Trimbak Rao Dabhade, consolidating Baji Rao’s authority as Peshwa and reaffirming the supremacy of Shahu I over the Maratha nobility. The victory at Dabhoi not only secured the Peshwa’s position within the Maratha hierarchy but also marked Chimaji Appa’s emergence as a capable field commander within his brother’s administration.

== Campaign against the Portuguese ==
Chimaji Appa's letter to the Peshwa

Chimaji Appa thereafter concentrated his military efforts in the Western Ghats against the Portuguese colonial strongholds along the Konkan coast. Vasai (then known as Bassein) was the ultimate objective of the campaign, as it served as the capital of the northern province of Portuguese India and the center of their political and commercial power north of Goa.

Capture of Belapur Fort

In 1733, the Marathas, led by Chimaji Appa and assisted by Sardar Shankarbuwa Shinde, captured the Belapur Fort from the Portuguese. The assault on the fort was initiated by Sardar Janojirao Shinde, the grandfather of Ranojirao Shinde and the younger brother of Dattaji Shinde I. Before the attack, Janojirao vowed that if the Marathas succeeded in recapturing the Belapur fort, he would offer a garland made of beli (Bael) leaves to the nearby Amruthaishwar Temple as a mark of gratitude. After the successful victory, the vow was fulfilled, and the fort became known as Belapur Fort in honor of the offering.

Capture of Vasai

After careful planning, Chimaji Appa led the Maratha armies into Portuguese-occupied territories along the Konkan coast in 1737. His strategy was to capture weaker forts first, progressively isolating and weakening the Portuguese before attacking their main stronghold at Bassein.

On 28 March 1737, Maratha forces under Ranojirao Shinde and Shankarbuwa Shinde captured the strategic island fortress of Arnala, cutting off a crucial supply and relief line to Vasai. Later that year, the Marathas liberated Thane and Salsette Island from Portuguese control.

In November 1738, Chimaji Appa captured Dahanu Fort, followed by the capitulation of Mahim on 20 January 1739. The forts of Kelva (Mahim), Sirgao, Tarapur, and Asserim soon fell to the Marathas, captured respectively by Chengojirao Shinde, Ranojirao Shinde, Janojirao Shinde, and Chimaji Appa himself. On 28 March 1739, the fortress of Karanja Island was also taken by Raolojirao Shinde, further tightening the Maratha control around Vasai.

To coordinate the siege operations, Chimaji established his headquarters at Bhavangad Fort, which he had commissioned in 1737 to serve as a strategic base for operations against Bassein Fort. Many of the campaign’s logistical and intelligence activities were directed from there.

In February 1739, Chimaji launched the final assault on Bassein Fort. He first occupied Versova Fort and Dharavi, effectively blockading the Bassein Creek to cut off Portuguese reinforcements. Maratha engineers laid mines under key sections of the fort walls, detonating them to breach the defenses. Fierce fighting followed as the Marathas, including Ranojirao and Janojirao Shinde, stormed the fort against strong Portuguese resistance, who employed superior firearms and artillery. After intense combat, the remaining defenders surrendered on 16 May 1739. The Portuguese commander, Captain Caetano de Souza Pereira, signed the surrender document as the garrison was heavily outnumbered.

Chimaji Appa granted the Portuguese safe passage from Vasai, allowing them eight days to remove their possessions. By 23 May 1739, all Portuguese personnel had withdrawn from the city. Portuguese records noted the loss of nearly all their northern possessions — including eight cities, four major ports, twenty forts, two fortified hills, and over 340 villages — effectively ending Portuguese rule north of Goa.

In gratitude for the victory, Chimaji Appa dedicated the victory ornaments of Vasai’s churches to the Saptashrungi and Bhavani temples, symbolizing the restoration of Hindu rule in the region. The campaign is widely regarded as one of the most brilliant and decisive military operations in Maratha history.

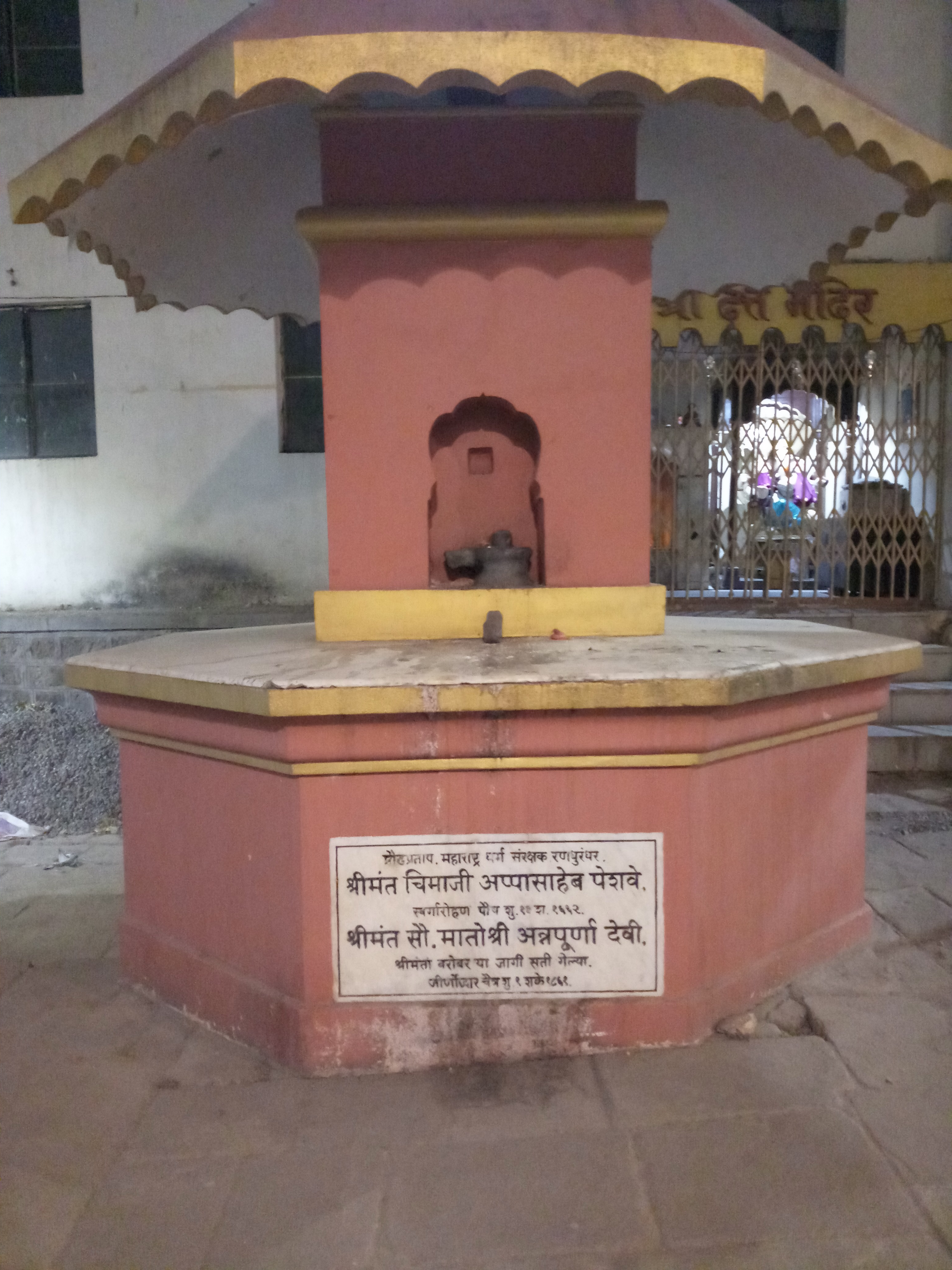
Samadhi (memorial) of Chimaji Appa and his wife Annapurnadevi, who committed sati after his death

== Death ==
Chimaji Appa died on 17 December 1740, at the age of about 33, at Pune (present-day Maharashtra). His death occurred barely six months after that of his elder brother, Peshwa Baji Rao I, in April 1740.

The exact cause of Chimaji Appa’s death remains unclear. Contemporary sources and later chroniclers describe his demise as sudden and unexpected. Some accounts attribute it to ill health and exhaustion following years of intensive military campaigning, while local traditions suggest it may have been due to a lingering illness he contracted after the Vasai campaign.

Chimaji Appa was cremated on the banks of the Bhima River, and a samadhi (memorial shrine) was erected in his honor near Vajreshwari Temple—the same temple he had commissioned after his victory over the Portuguese. His wife, Annapurnadevi, is said to have committed sati upon his funeral pyre, following the custom practiced by some women of the nobility at that time.

== Legacy ==
Chimaji Appa is considered as one of the most capable and principled military commanders of the Maratha Empire. His leadership in the campaign against the Portuguese and the capture of the Vasai Fort are widely regarded as among the most decisive victories in Maratha military history. The victory effectively ended over two centuries of Portuguese dominance north of Goa and established Maratha control over the entire northern Konkan coast, securing key ports, trade routes, and territories that would sustain the empire’s maritime and economic expansion.

To commemorate his triumph, Chimaji Appa fulfilled a vow to the Hindu deity Vajreshwari constructing the Vajreshwari Temple near Vasai. The temple remains an important religious and historical site in the region and continues to attract devotees. He also offered large bronze church bells seized from Portuguese churches as war trophies to temples across Maharashtra, including the Bhimashankar, Menavali near Wai, Omkareshwar and Banshankar Temple in Pune, and the Ramalinga Temple at Shirur. These bells, many of which still hang in temples today, stand as physical symbols of the Maratha victory over the Portuguese.

He also played a major role in the reconstruction and administrative reorganization of the Vasai-Virar region after the Portuguese defeat. Several towns and villages — including Vasai, Bhayandar, Virar, Navghar, Rai, Gorai, and Dongri — are traditionally associated with his governance and post-war restoration policies. Among local Konkani and Agri communities, his victory is still commemorated annually on Gudi Padwa, the Maharashtrian New Year, through traditional Powada ballads celebrating his courage and piety.

Presently, a large public ground in Vasai, a suburb of present-day Mumbai, is named Chimaji Appa Kridangan (“Chimaji Appa Sports Ground”) in his memory, serving as a venue for cultural and sporting events. A memorial complex was also constructed near the Vasai Fort, featuring a statue of Chimaji Appa, landscaped gardens, and commemorative plaques detailing his life and achievements.

== In popular culture ==
- In the 2015 drama film Bajirao Mastani directed by Sanjay Leela Bhansali, Chimaji Appa was portrayed by Vaibhav Tatwawadi.
- In the popular historical drama Peshwa Bajirao, telecasted on Sony TV from 23 January 2017, the character of young Chimaji was portrayed by the young child artist Ayaan Zubair Rehmani, and the elder Chimaji was played by actor Saurabh Gokhale.
