= Amboli =

Amboli may refer to:

- Amboli, Mumbai, Maharashtra
- Amboli, Pune, Maharashtra
- Amboli, Sindhudurg, Maharashtra (Amboli hill station)
- Amboli, Belgaum, Karnataka
- Amboli, Dharwad, Karnataka
