= Battle of Dabhoi =

1731 battle in Gujarat, India

- Part of Maratha campaigns in Gujarat
Date	28 April 1731
Location	Dabhoi (in present-day Gujarat, India) 22.1376000°N 73.4161719°E
Result	Bajirao I's victory: Peshwa's dominance in Gujarat.; The dominance of the Senapati Dabhade over Gujarat ended

Belligerents
Trimbakrao's Maratha faction Supported by: Nizam of Hyderabad	Bajirao's Maratha faction

Commanders and leaders
Trimbak Rao Dabhade †; Udaji Pawar; Maloji Pawar †; Anandrao Pawar; Pilaji Gaekwad; Janoji Kolkhar; Nimboji Thorat	Peshwa Bajirao I Chimaji Appa; Pilaji Jadhavrao; Ranoji Shinde; Narayanji Dhamdhere †

Strength
Sinha: Total 50,000 men Sardesai: 30,000 Infantry; 10,000 Cavalry; 40 Musketeers Total 40,000 men	Sinha: Total 15,000 men Sardesai: 25,000 Cavalry; 2000 Infantry; 160 Musketeers Total 25,000 men

The Battle of Dabhoi was fought on 28 April 1731, and it was a major confrontation between the Trimbak Rao Dabhade and Baji Rao I due to political interference of Peshwas in Gujarat Province. It was fought due to rights of Chauth (Tax Collection) of Gujarat. The rights of collecting Chauth of Gujarat was held by Dabhade clan from the time of Khanderao Dabhade. Baji Rao I asked Trimbak Rao Dabhade to share the rights of Chauth of Gujarat to him. But Trimbak Rao refused because of which Baji Rao attacked the army camp of Dabhades in April 1731. The Pawar brothers of Dhar were also upset with Baji Rao I due his policy in Malwa so they also joined Trimbak Rao's side. Some other sources say that Trimbak Rao joined Nizam of Hyderabad due to which Bajirao I attacked him.

== Background ==
In the year 1731, Peshwa Bajirao I asked Trimbak Rao Dabhade to share the rights of Chauth of Gujarat with him. But Trimbak Rao refused to share the rights of Chauth and due to this the battle was fought. The Pawar brothers of Dhar were also upset with Baji Rao I due his policy so they also joined Trimbak Rao's side.

== Battle ==
Chimaji Appa led a large army to intercept Trimbak Rao Dabhade during the Battle of Dabhoi. During the battle Trimbak Rao, who was seated on an elephant, was shot by a musketeer. Because of this, the morale of his troops started decreasing. Trimbak Rao's father-in-law; Maloji Pawar of Waghale was also killed in this battle. Many commanders of Peshwas died in this battle. After the death of Trimbak Rao in battlefield Chimaji Appa retreated his force and moved towards Satara.

== Aftermath ==
The matter was settled by Shahu: Yashwant Rao Dabhade was given the title of Sar-senapati. Pilaji Gaekwad was appointed as chief of Gujarat Province. The Chauth rights in Malwa were given to Pawar brothers.
