= Dhanaji Jadhav =

Senapati of the Maratha Empire from 1696 to 1708

Dhanaji Jadhav Rao
- Senapati
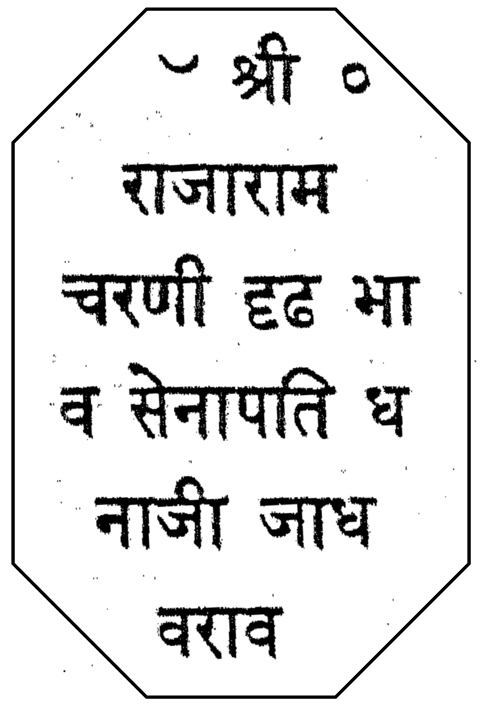
- Seal of Dhanaji Jadhav Rao

8th Senapati of the Maratha Empire
- Reign: 1696 – July 1708
- Predecessor: Santaji Ghorpade
- Successor: Chandrasen Jadhav
- Born: 1650
- Died: July 1708; Vadgaon, Maratha Empire (present-day Kolhapur District, Maharashtra, India)
- Spouse: Gopikabai
- Issue: Santaji; Chandrasen; Shambhu Singh II
- House: Jadhav
- Father: Shambhu Singh I
- Religion: Hinduism

Dhanaji Jadhav (1650 – July 1708) also known as Dhanaji Jadhav Rao, was a prominent Maratha general and served as the Senapati of the Maratha Empire during the reigns of Rajaram I, Tarabai, and Shahu I. Alongside Santaji Ghorpade, he conducted highly successful campaigns against the Mughals from 1689 to 1696, contributing significantly to the Maratha cause. Furthermore, he played a pivotal role in the initial expansion of the Gujarat Subah while consistently defeating Mughal forces.

== Background ==
Dhanaji was a member of the Jadhav clan of Sindkhed Raja. He was the descendant of Lakhuji Jadhav. Dhanaji was raised by Shivaji's mother, Jijabai, following the assassination of Dhanaji's great-grandfather, Achloji, who was Jijabai's brother. Achloji's son, Santaji, perished in the Battle of Kanakagiri. Santaji's son and Dhanaji's father, Shambhu Singh, was also nurtured by Jijabai. Shambhu Singh met his demise at the Battle of Pavan Khind.

== Early military career ==
At a young age, Dhanaji joined the Maratha Army under the leadership of Shivaji's commander-in-chief, Prataprao Gujar. During the battles at Umbrani and Nesari, Dhanaji's exceptional performance drew the attention of Shivaji for the first time. He was subsequently appointed by Shivaji, even on his deathbed, as one of the six pillars of the Maratha Empire who would safeguard the kingdom during challenging times. Their unwavering struggle and continued resistance against the Army of the Mughal Empire played a crucial role in ensuring the survival and success of the Marathas in the 27-Year war between the forces of Aurangzeb and the Marathas.

== Mughal-Maratha wars ==
Dhanaji and his fellow general , Santaji Ghorpade, are acknowledged for their pivotal role in combating the Mughal forces during the reign of Rajaram I. Their dedicated service to the Maratha cause effectively thwarted the advances of Aurangzeb's Army of the Mughal Empire for a quarter of a century. With the demise of Aurangzeb, Mughal influence in Maharashtra ultimately waned, never to regain prominence.

During the conflict, the Marathas utilized both infantry and cavalry to effectively engage and disrupt the Mughal forces. Following the fall of Bijapur and Golconda, a significant number of horsemen found themselves unemployed. As a result, they sought employment with the Maratha forces under the leadership of Santaji Ghorpade and Dhanaji Jadhav. In the absence of central authority, these two commanders acted on their own initiative and swiftly developed expertise in coordinating cavalry movements over extended distances.

Queen Tarabai praised Dhanaji and his colleague Santaji, for their daring attack on Aurangzeb's camp. A marathi drama 'Bhangale Swapn Maharashtra' written by Bashir Momin Kavathekar depicts the thrill and adventures raid on Aurangzeb's camp at Tulapur and also brings out how stringently the guidelines laid down by Shivaji Maharaj were being followed by Maratha soldiers (which spared Aurangzeb's life because he was offering religious prayers).

In November 1703, Aurangzeb initiated negotiations with Dhanaji through his son, Muhammad Kam Bakhsh, with the intention of transferring Shahu I to him. However, these talks proved unsuccessful due to what were perceived as exorbitant demands made by Dhanaji on behalf of the Maratha king.

== Gujarat campaign ==
In 1705, a Maratha Army, consisting of approximately 40,000 soldiers led by Dhanaji, launched a successful assault on Surat, defeating the Mughal forces across the entire region of Gujarat, extending up to Bharuch, and subsequently imposing the Chauth tribute on them. Dhanaji also achieved victory over the Mughal army commanded by Nazar Ali, the Nawab of Baroda.

== Later years and death ==
In 1708, through the mediation of his assistant Balaji Vishwanath, who would later assume the position of Peshwa in 1713, Dhanaji disassociated himself from Tarabai and aligned with Shahu I at Battle of Khed. Unfortunately, shortly thereafter, he died due to a leg injury at Vadgaon, Kolhapur. Subsequently, his post was assumed by his son, Chandrasen Jadhavrao.

== In popular culture ==
=== Films and television ===
- He was portrayed by Sanjay Batra in the 2017 Hindi Peshwa Bajirao (TV series).
- He was portrayed by Shubhankar Ekbote in the 2025 Hindi film Chhaava.
