= Maratha army =

Land-based armed forces of the Maratha Confederacy

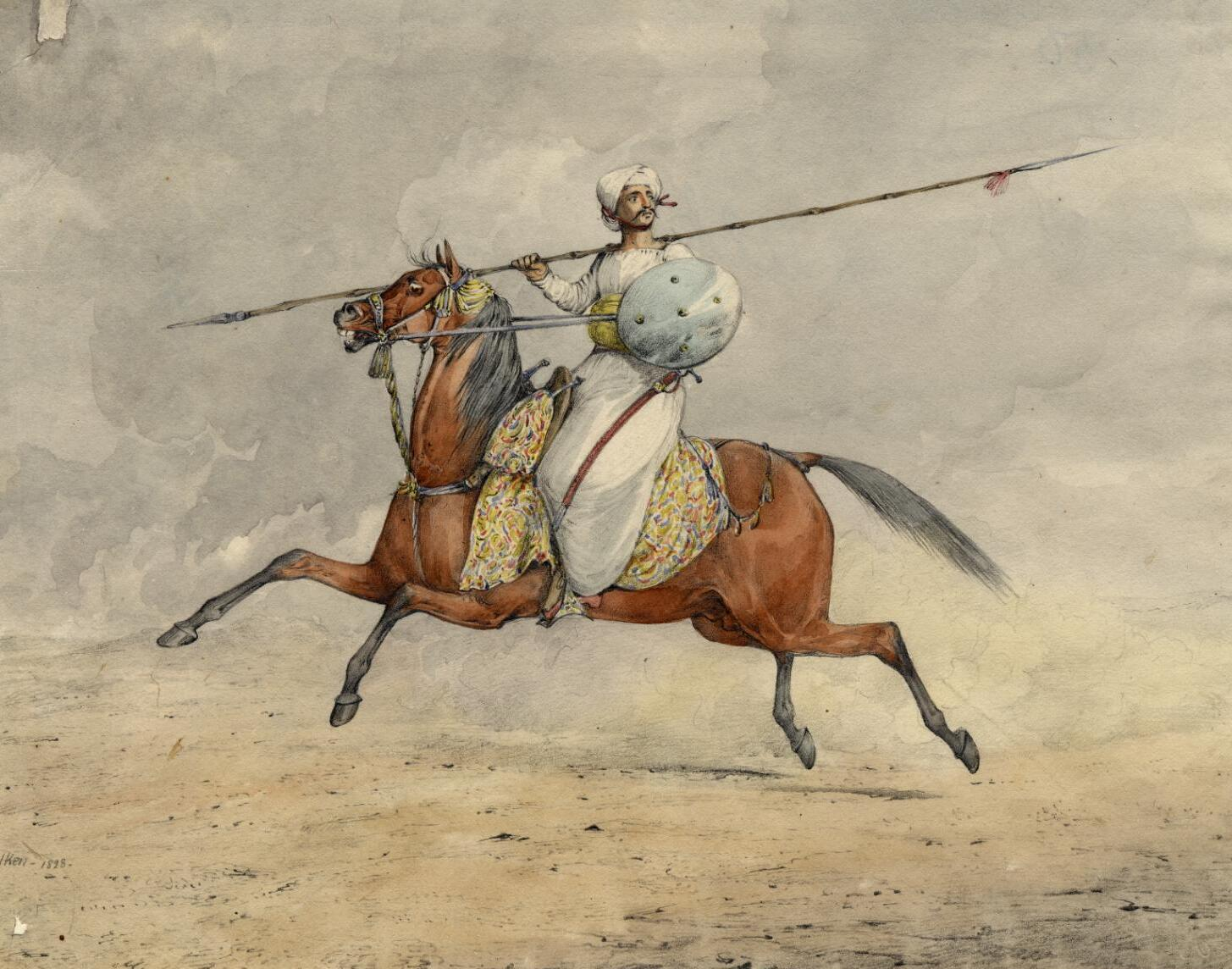
- Painting depicting a Maratha light cavalryman
- Active: c. 1650–1818
- Country: Maratha Empire
- Type: Land-based army

Commanders
- Senapati: Mankoji Dahatonde; Netaji Palkar; Prataprao Gujar; Anandrao; Hambirrao Mohite; Mhaloji Ghorpade; Santaji Ghorpade; Dhanaji Jadhav; Yasajirao Kank; Trimbak Rao Dabhade; Khanderao Dabhade; Bajirao I Chimaji Appa; Sadashivrao Bhau; Ranoji Shinde; Malharrao Holkar; Raghoji I Bhosale; Haibatrao Shilimkar

The Maratha army was the land-based armed forces of the Maratha Empire, which existed from the late 17th to the early 19th centuries in the Indian subcontinent.

== 17th century ==
Shivaji, the founder of the Maratha Kingdom, raised a small yet effective land army. For better administration, Shivaji abolished the land-grants or jagir for military officers and instituted a system of salary or cash payment for their services known as the saranjam. During the 17th century the Maratha army was small in terms of numbers when compared to the Mughal Army, numbering some 100,000. Shivaji gave more emphasis to infantry compared to cavalry, considering the rugged mountainous terrain he operated in. Furthermore, Shivaji did not have access to the North Indian Mughal dominated horse markets. During this era, the armies of the Marathas were known for their agility due to the light equipment of both infantry and cavalry. Artillery was mostly confined to the Maratha fortresses, which were located on hilltops, since it gave a strategic advantage and furthermore, these fortresses had the ability to withstand sieges (such as being equipped with sufficient water supply). The Marathas used weapons like muskets, matchlocks, firangi swords, clubs, bows, spears, daggers, etc. The cavalry rode the Bhimthadi horse, which was developed by crossing Arabian and local horse breeds.

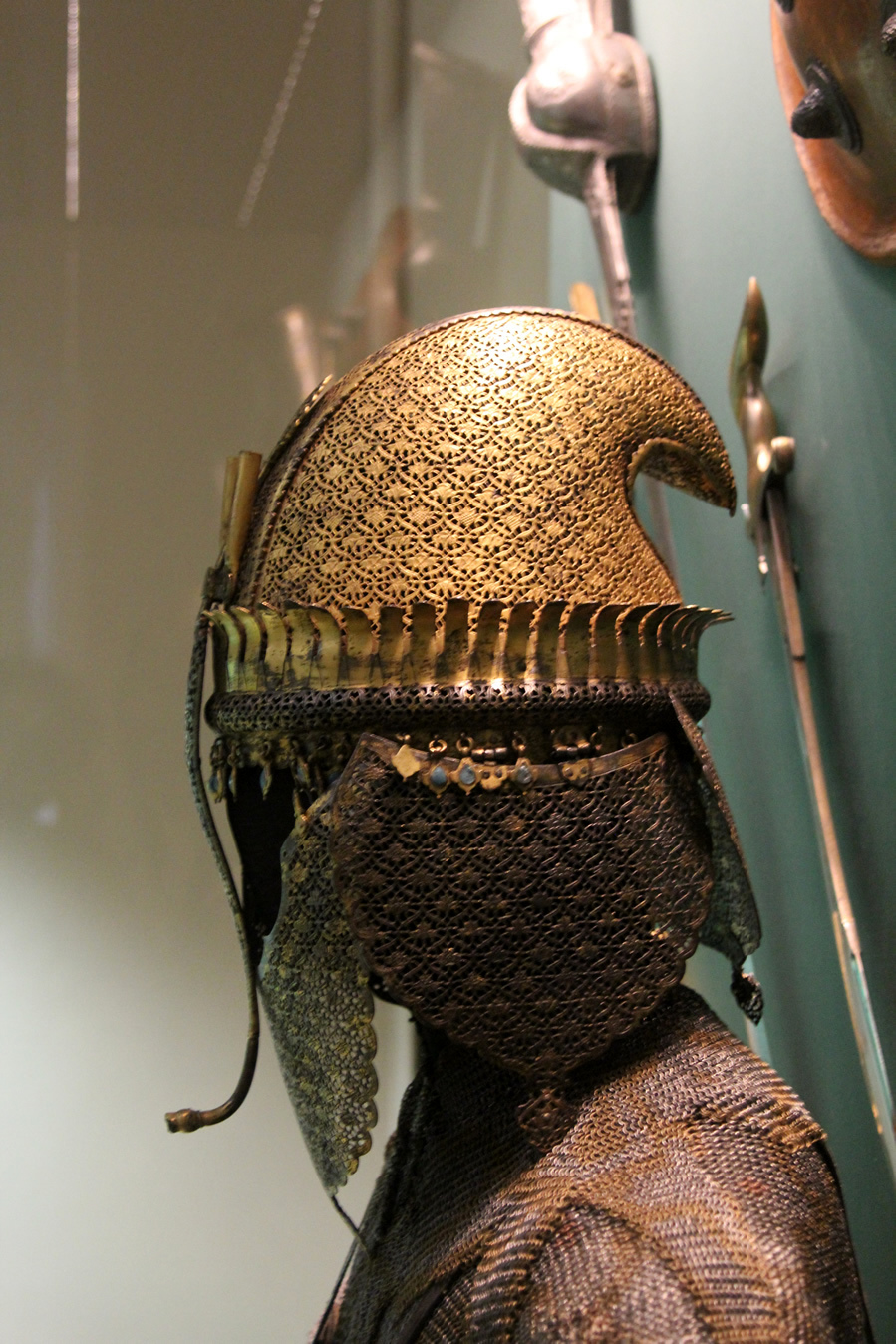
A Maratha helmet and armour from Hermitage Museum, St Petersburg, Russia

The Maratha army, during Shivaji's era was systematic and disciplined. A case in point here is that the Marathas achieved success in the systematic elimination of all forts which came their way during the Battle of Surat circa 1664. When it came to the artillery, Shivaji hired foreign (mainly Portuguese) mercenaries for assistance to manufacture weapons. The hiring of foreign mercenaries was not new to the Maratha military culture. Shivaji hired seasoned cannon-casting Portuguese technicians from Goa. The Marathas attached importance to hiring of experts, which can be corroborated by the fact that important posts in the army were offered to the officers in charge of the manufacture of guns.

The Army deployed musketeers as well - both regular soldiers and mercenaries. During the late 17th century, there is a mention of the Marathas using "well-armed musketeers" during their attack on Goa (during the reign of Sambhaji). Furthermore, during the same period there is also a mention of Marathas using Karnataki musketeers renowned for marksmanship

=== Structure and rank ===
Below was the structure and ranks of armies of the great Maratha at a high level during the reign of Shivaji: Cavalry was divided into two at a high level:

- Shiledar: A shiledar brought his own horse and equipment. Although organized different, even shiledar converged into the Sarnobat (chief of army)
- Bargir: One of the lowest rank (rank and file) cavalryman of the Marathas who was provided with horse and equipment from the state's stock

The infantry consisted of the below:

- Hetkari musketeers: Konkani musketeers recruited typically from the Konkan region, who possessed matchlocks and noted for their marksmanship
- Mavales: Foot soldier recruited typically from Western Maharashtra

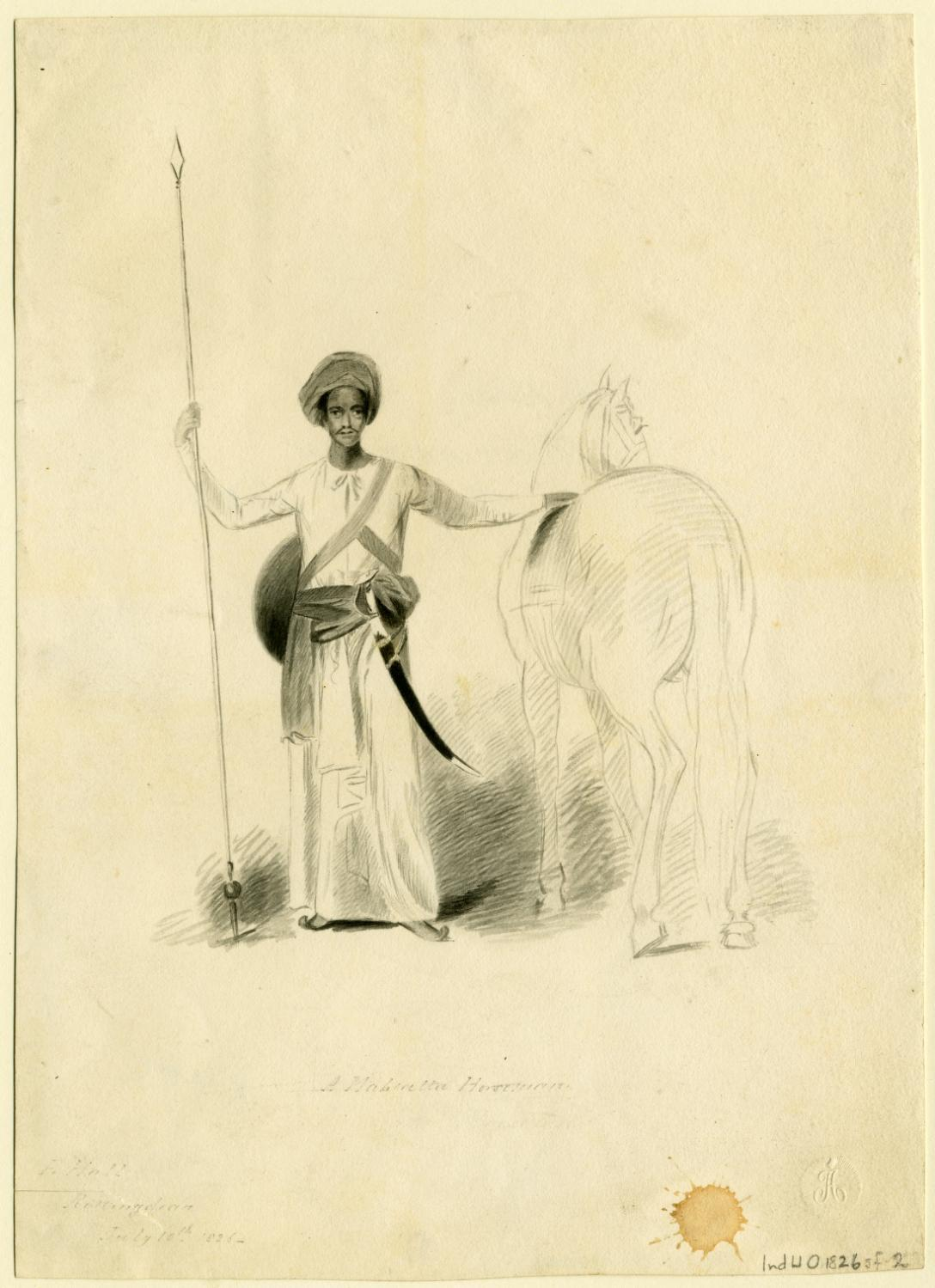
A Mahratta horseman – original pencil sketch by the artist H. Hall; standing figure in military uniform with spear, left hand resting on horse

Ranks and salary of the cavalry are as below. The infantry had a similar structure

- Senapati or Sarnobat (chief of army) (part of the Ashta Pradhan): 4000 to 5000 hons per year
- Panch Hazari: 2000 hons per year
- Hazari: 1000 hons per year
- Jumledar: 500 hons per year
- Havaldar: 125 hons per year
- Bargir: 9 hons per year

Infantry ranks (starting with senior-most rank):

- Sarnobat (chief of Army)
- Saat (Seven) Hazari
- Hazari
- Jamdar
- Havaldar
- Nayak (or Naik)
- Paek

=== During the War of 27 Years ===
During the Deccan Wars (1680–1707), the Maratha State's regular army dispersed, and the theater of war expanded to encompass the entire Deccan region. During this period, the Maratha forces adopted guerrilla warfare tactics. In addition to the regular army, bands of irregular soldiers joined the fight, transforming the conflict into a people's war. A distinct army was raised, with principal leaders including Powar Vishwas Rao, Thorat Dinkar Rao, and Atowlay Samsher Bahadur. Raiding the enemy's rear positions and attacking isolated posts and supply lines became common strategies. Throughout this period, ordinary men and women from virtually every town and village offered shelter and support to the Maratha forces, led by the valiant generals Santaji Ghorpade and Dhanaji Jadhav. These collective efforts significantly contributed to the success of the Marathas in their struggle against the Mughal Empire.

Jadunath Sarkar, the noted historian, writes in his famous book, the military history of India about Santaji Ghorpade, a brilliant strategist who fought against the Mughals in the 27-year war.

He was a perfect master of this art, which can be more correctly described as Parthian warfare than as guerrilla tactics, because he could not only make night marches and surprises, but also cover long distances quickly and combine the movements of large bodied over wide areas with an accuracy and punctuality which were incredible in any Asiatic army other than those of Chengiz Khan and Tamurlane.

== 18th century ==
=== Pre-1761 ===
During the 18th century the Maratha army continued its emphasis on its light cavalry, which proved better against the heavy cavalry of the Mughals. Post 1720, the armies of the Maratha Confederacy, in the reign of Shahu I made their presence felt in Northern India (the bastion of the Mughals) and scored numerous military victories, primarily due to the skills of Bajirao I as a great cavalry commander and military strategist. Bajirao Peshwa made excellent use of small and heavy ammunition (using it in excellent coordination) and used smothering tactics. The Marathas led by Bajirao I would use their artillery to create a blanket of projectiles to smother the enemy.

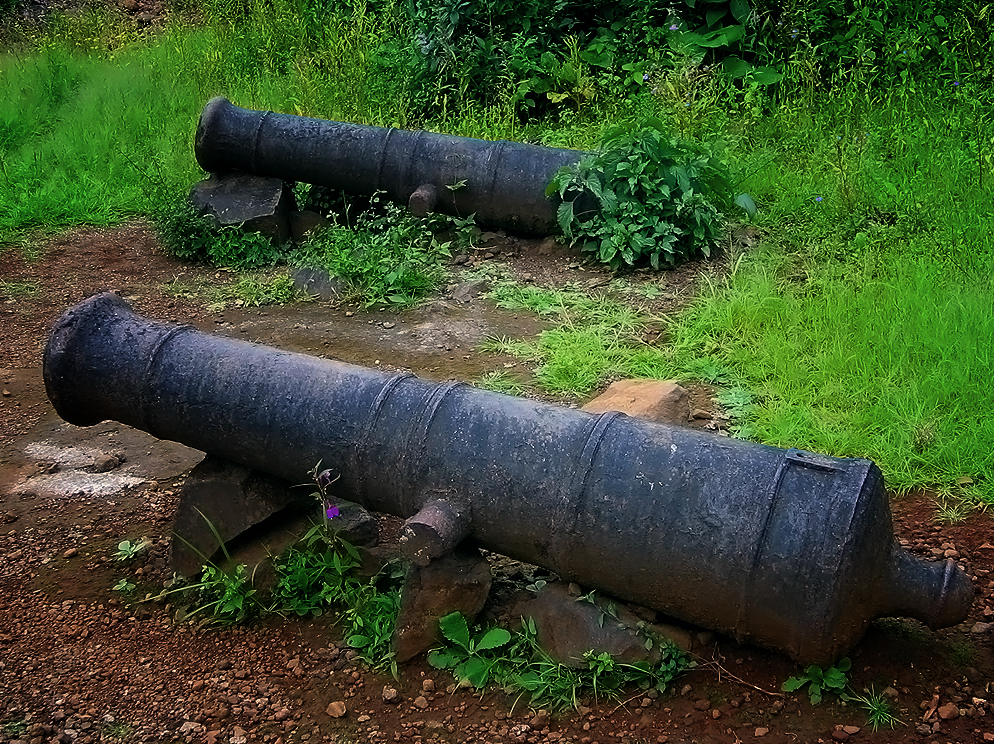
A Maratha cannon (Artillery battery), as seen at Raigad Hillfort

A hallmark of Bajirao I contingents was that of long-distance cavalry attacks, typically light and agile cavalry. During the reign of Shahu I, the cavalry strength was some 100,000. His own cavalry was called as the Huzurat Cavalry, which was an elite cavalry division. Furthermore, Bajirao used massed ranks of infantry consisting of flintlock-armed regulars under South Asian officers.

=== Modernization pre-1761 ===
When the Marathas confronted the French (allies of the Nizam of Hyderabad) on the battlefield in the 1750s, they realized the importance of western-style disciplined infantry. Hence the process of modernization began even before the Third Battle of Panipat (1761). Sadashivrao Bhau admired Western-style disciplined infantry. Circa 1750s, the Marathas endeavored to hire the services of the French General Marquis de Bussy-Castelnau (who served in the Nizam's Army) for training purposes, but when they failed in their efforts, they managed to hire Ibrahim Khan Gardi. Ibrahim Khan was an artillery expert trained under the leadership of Bussy. The word gardi is a corruption of the French word garde (guard) and this gardi formed the backbone of Maratha infantry. Ibrahim Khan played a major role in re-configuring the Maratha artillery. He served the Marathas in the infamous Third Battle of Panipat. During the battle, out of the approximate 40,000 Maratha army soldiers, some 8000 or 9000 were artillery (Gardi Infantry). They possessed 200 cannons (consisting of heavy field-pieces as well as light camel or elephant-mounted zambaruks (camel-mounted swivel guns) and also possessed handguns.

During this era, sources state that the Marathas made use of both flintlocks and matchlocks and that their matchlocks had a technological advantage having superior range and velocity. However at Third Battle of Panipat, they possessed mainly just swords and spears whilst Abdali possessed a larger force with flintlock muskets.

=== Modernization post-1761 ===
From the 17th century till the mid-18th century the artillery of the Marathas was more dependent on foreign gunners rather than their own.

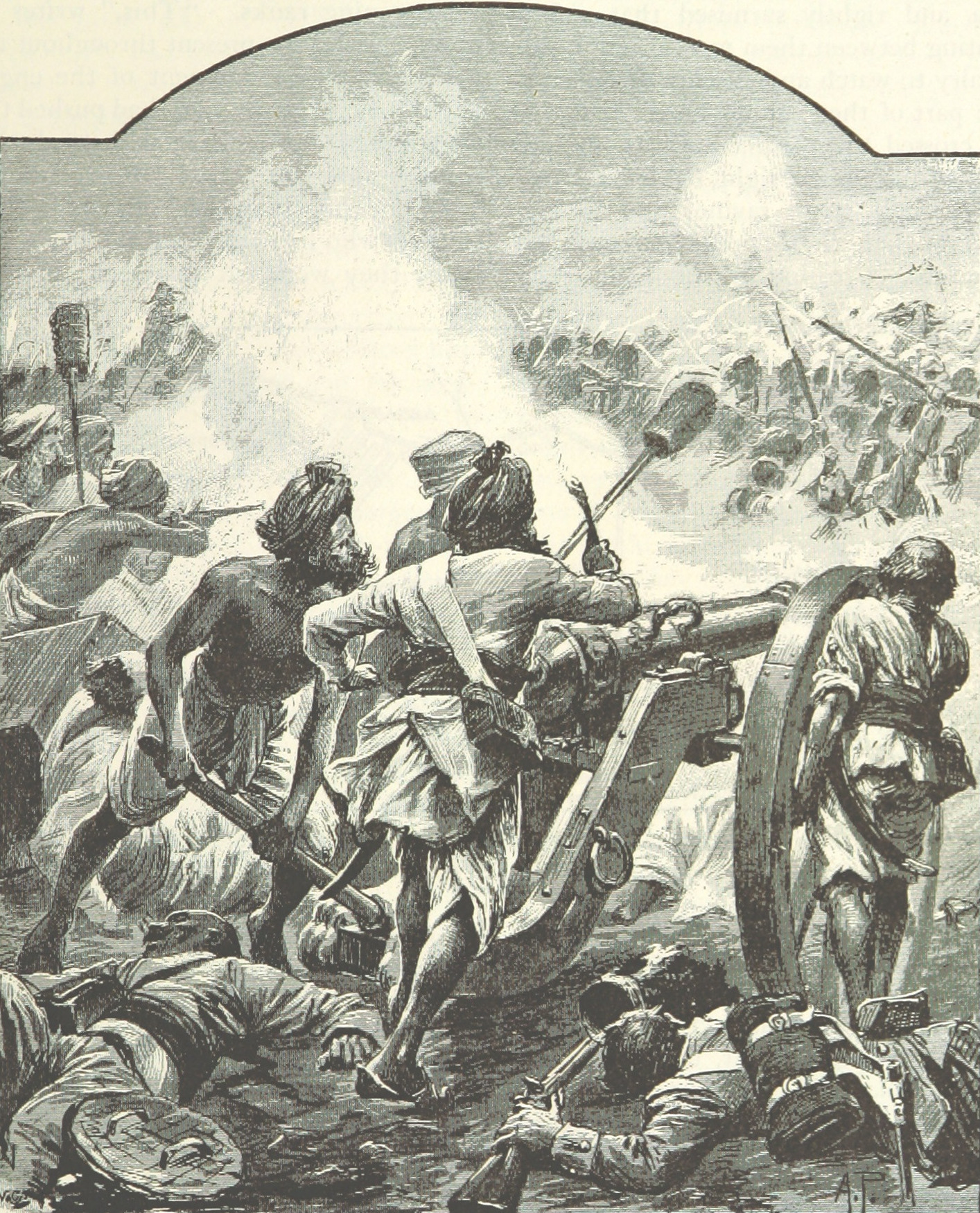
Maratha infantry and gunners at the Battle of Assaye

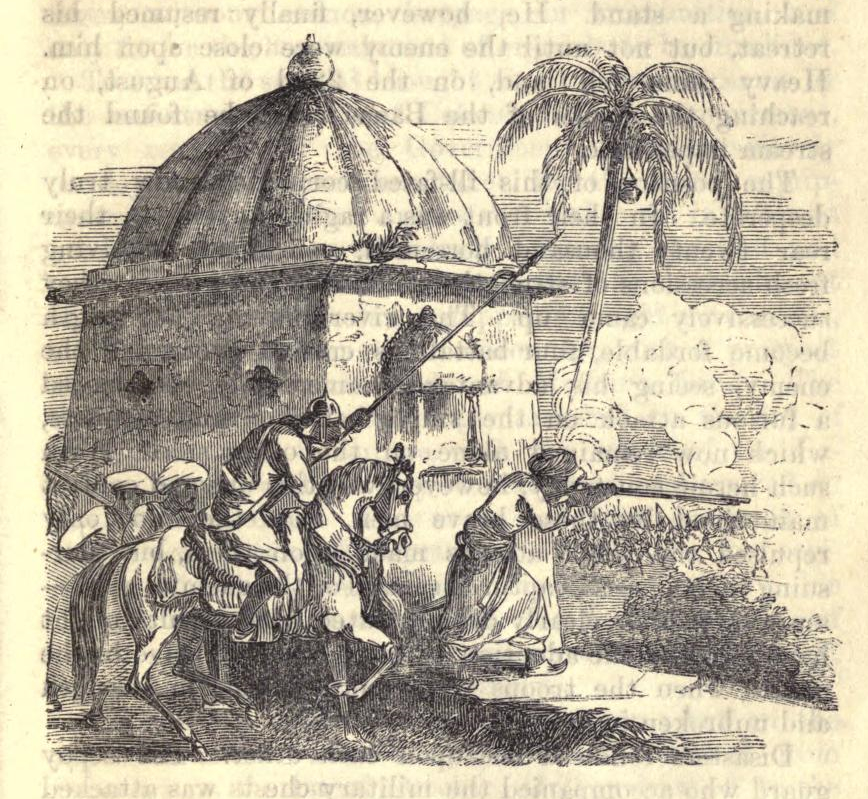
Holkar troops harassing Monson's retreating troops

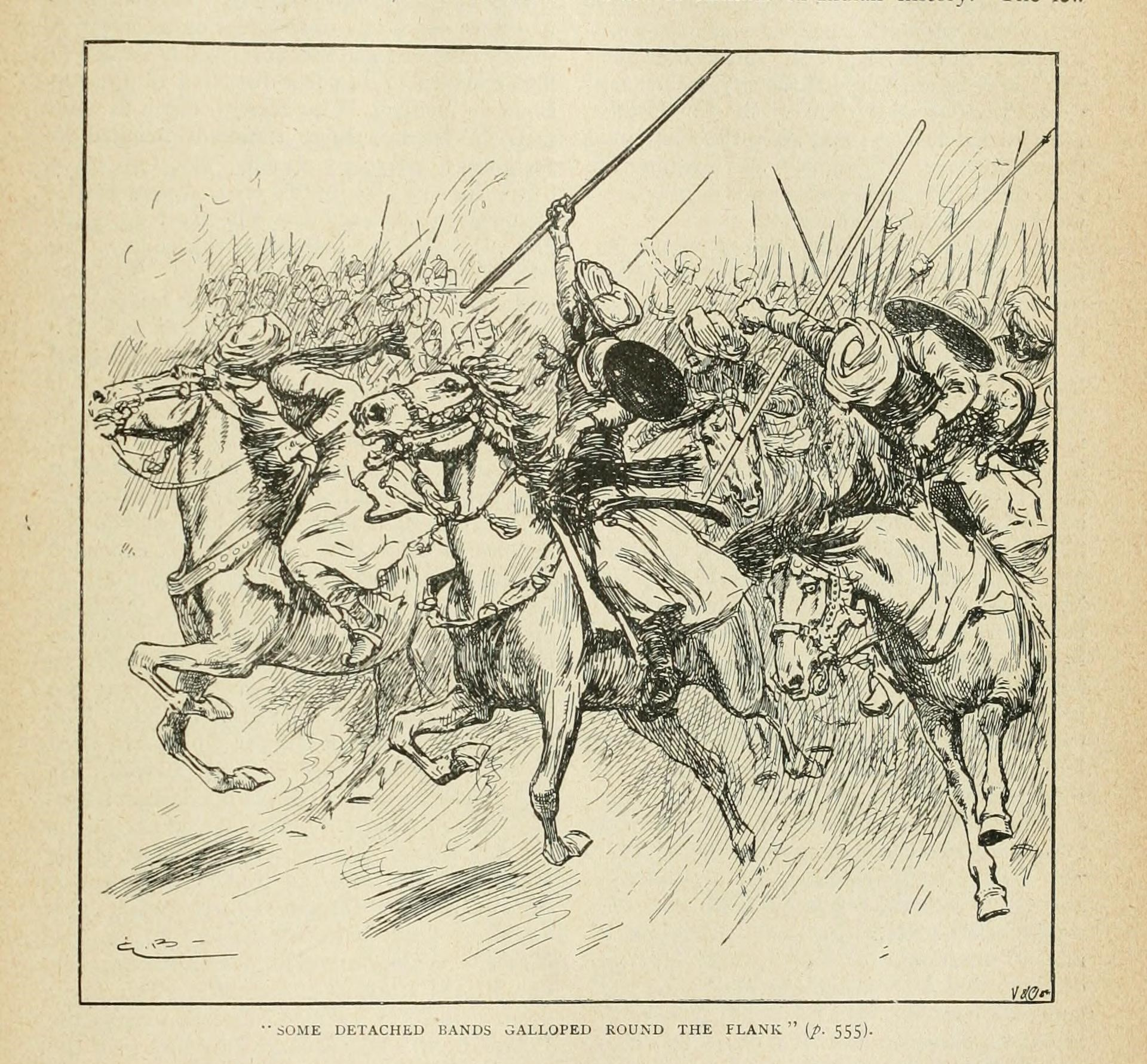
Maratha Cavalry at Kirkee, 1817

After 1761, Mahadaji Shinde, a distinguished Maratha general, focused his attention on European artillery and secured the services of the noted Frenchman Benoît de Boigne who had received training from the best of the European military schools. Following suit, the other Maratha chiefs such as the Peshwas, the Holkars, the Bhosales, also raised French-trained artillery battalions. The army of Baji Rao II included the Pinto brothers Jose Antonio and Fransisco from the famous Goan noble family who had escaped Goa after trying to overthrow the government in the Conspiracy of the Pintos.

- Peshwa's Cavalry: Peshwa's own cavalry, the elite Huzurat were equipped with matchlocks instead of long spears.
- Scindia's infantry organization and weapons under De Boigne: De Boigne organized his infantry under campoos. One campoo had 10 infantry battalions, which consisted of 4000 infantrymen equipped with flintlocks and bayonets. Each battalion had 5 guns (1 howitzer and 4 field guns) and every battalion was commanded by a European gunner. Each campoo had 30 siege guns (16 and 24-pounder guns), apart from mortars, howitzers, and camel-mounted blunderbusses. Five campoos were raised between 1790 and 1803. The artillery had 50 bronze cannons (half of which were big caliber guns).
- Bhonsle of Nagpur raised two infantry brigades with modern military training, however without any European officers.
- Training: Further there was emphasis on training and infantrymen were trained on handling firearms, gunnery practice, and military manoeuvres.
- Innovations: Under De Boigne a new weapon was invented having six musket barrels joined together.
- Ambulance Corps: Another novelty was the ambulance corps in charge of providing aid to wounded soldiers (including enemy soldiers).
- Composition: Under Mahadji Scindia, Rajput and Muslim infantrymen were recruited in the Maratha army. Further, his cavalrymen had a different uniform - long trousers as opposed to the shorter Deccani ones
- Military-Industrial Complex: Furthermore in 1784, Mahadaji Shinde established a military-industrial complex for the armies of the Marathas near Agra. The ordnance factories of the Marathas made use of sophisticated indigenous technologies with more of adaptation as against innovation. Mahadaji Shinde created one of finest armies in India, with the help of the French and Portuguese and it also included a brigade known as Deccan Invincibles, which numbered some 27,000.
- There is a mention of induction of 6 pound field guns under the command of Pierre Perron, Maratha General of Scindia dominions (the successor of De Boigne). These 6 pound guns were inducted after phasing out the earlier light 3 pound ones.
- In a bid to Westernize the artillery, circa 1777, there is a mention of a Portuguese officer named Naronha heading the Peshwa's artillery and further he had a number of European artillery men working under him. Circa 1790, the Peshwa's forces employed a Portuguese officer for casting 40-pounder guns.

"However a point to be noted here is that it is untrue to conclude that armies of the Maratha got disciplined only post 1761. The Marathas were well aware of the importance of discipline and disciplined and drilled infantry in Maharashtra existed even in the Hindu classical era. The Mahrattas were aware of the Portuguese infantry models having concepts like 'Spanish square' since sixteenth century."

In the late 18th and early 19th century, with French-trained artillery and infantry, the Marathas managed to regain their lost ground in North India, however they could not match the superior artillery of the British East India Company, which in due course of time, among other reasons, led to the defeat of the Marathas at the Third Anglo-Maratha War and decline of their Confederacy itself.

=== Employment of the Pindaris ===
Pindaris were irregular horsemen and their primary role was to plunder in return of payment. Pindaris composed of both Muslims and Hindus. They had implicit support from Maratha chiefs (Maharajas) such as Scindias of Gwalior, Holkars of Indore, and Bhosales of Nagpur. This band of freebooters accompanied Maratha forces during their campaigns and helped win wars in return for plunder and pay. They were a part of the Maratha army during the Third Battle of Panipat and almost all Anglo-Maratha Wars.

=== Employment of Bargis ===
The Nagpur Bhosales employed thousands of units called bargi to invade the Bengal Subah. The invasions lasted annually for ten years until finally the Nawab of Bengal, European merchants and locals built the Maratha Ditch to safeguard themselves from war.

=== Commemorations ===
In 2025, the Maratha Military Landscapes of India, a group of 12 forts, were enlisted as a cultural World Heritage Site by UNESCO.

== See also ==
- Maratha Confederacy
- Maratha Navy
- History of India
- Military History of India
- Pindari
- Bargi
