= Vajreshwari Temple =

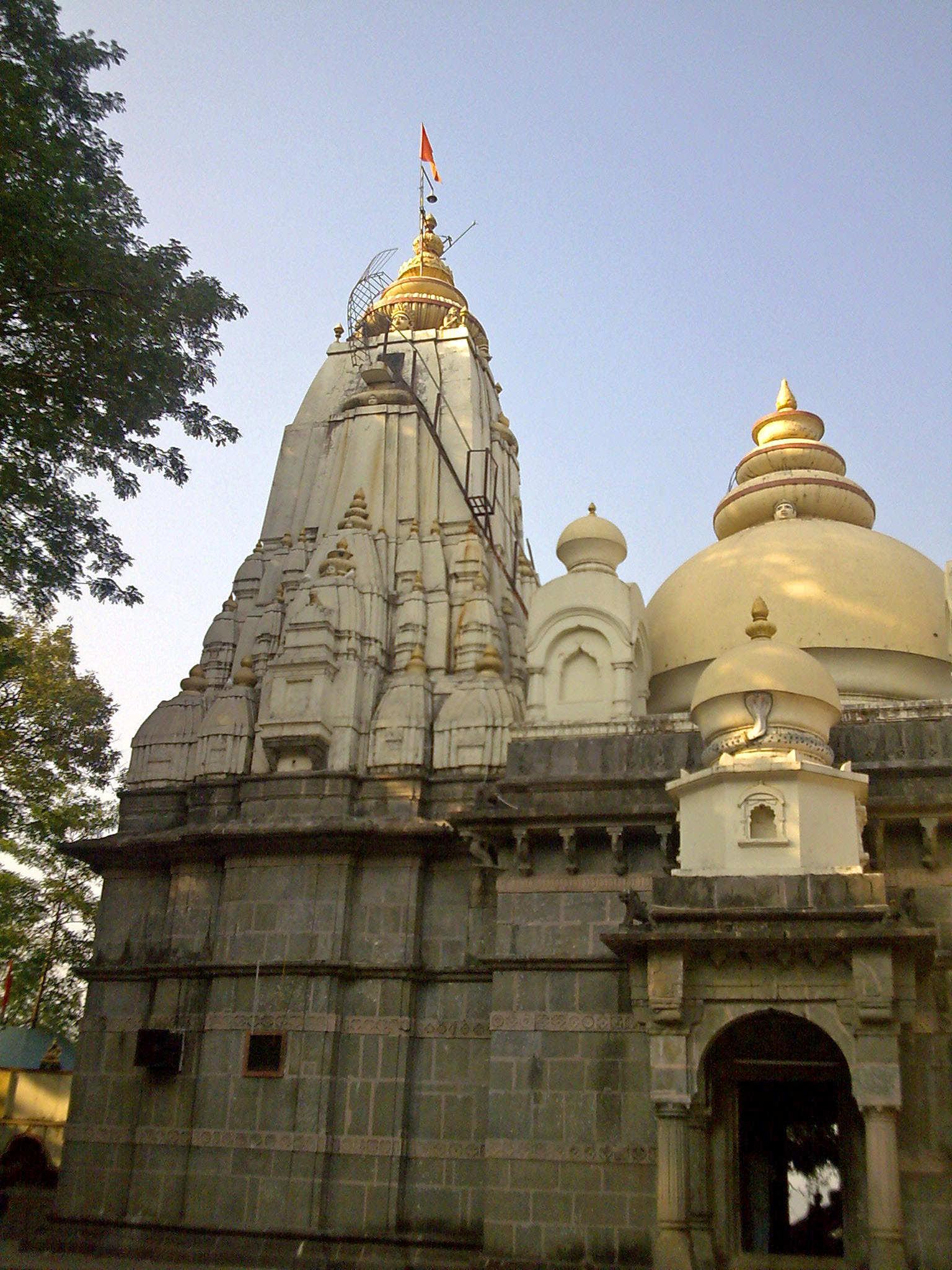

- Location in Maharashtra

Religion
- Affiliation: Hinduism
- District: Thane
- Deity: Vajreshwari

Location
- Location: Vajreshwari (town)
- State: Maharashtra
- Country: India
- Coordinates: 19°29′12″N 73°1′33″E

Architecture
- Creator: Chimaji Appa
- Completed: 1739
- Temple: 2

The Vajreshwari Yogini Devi Mandir is a temple to the Hindu goddess Vajreshwari, in the town of Vajreshwari, 75 km from Mumbai.
