= Battle of Khed =

1707 battle in Maharashtra, India

- Part of Maratha Civil Wars
Date	12 October 1707
Location	Khed, Maharashtra, India 18°52′N 73°54′E
Result	Shahu's victory: Most Maratha generals joined Shahu

Belligerents
Forces of Shahu I	Forces of Tarabai

Commanders and leaders
Shahu I Parsoji Bhonsle; Malharraje Korde; Chimnaji Damodar	Dhanaji Jadhav (AWOL); Parshuram Pant Pratinidhi; Balaji Vishwanath (AWOL)
- Location within present-day Maharastra Location within India

The Battle of Khed took place on 12 October 1707, between Shahu I and the forces of Tarabai led by Dhanaji Jadhav. The battle occurred at Khed, situated near the Bhima river to the north of Pune.
