= Vajreshwari =

- Village
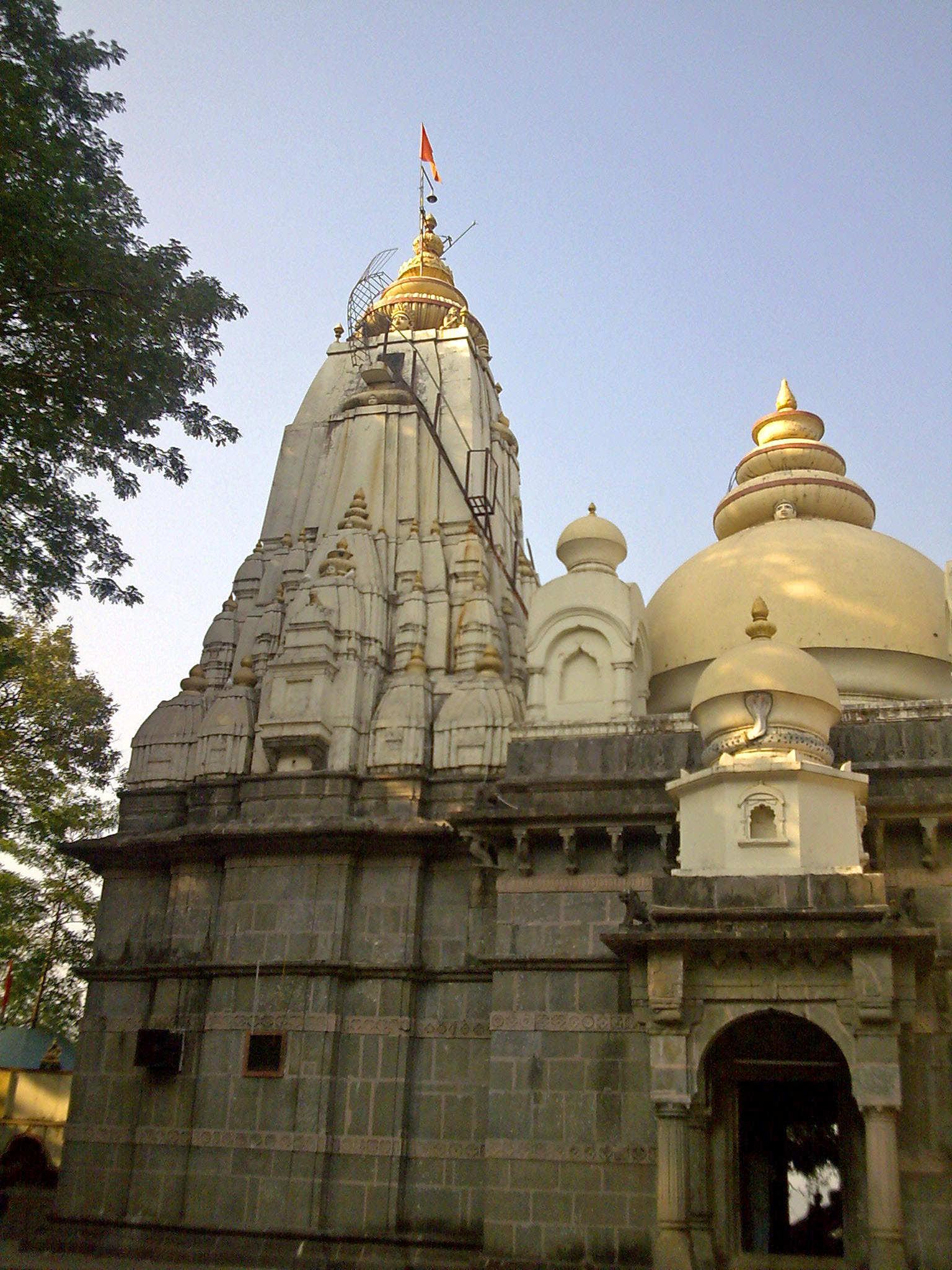
- Vajreshwari temple
- Interactive map of Vajreshwari
- Coordinates: 19.487753°N 73.02809°E
- Country: India
- State: Maharashtra
- District: Thane district

Government
  - Body: Gram panchayat

Languages
  - Official: Marathi
- Time zone: UTC+5:30 (IST)
- PIN: 401204
- Telephone code: 02522
- Nearest city: Mumbai
- Website: maharashtra.gov.in

Vajreshwari (also known as Vajrabai) is a village situated near the Tansa River in the Bhiwandi taluk of Thane district, Maharashtra, India. It is famous for the Vajreshwari Temple and hot water springs.
