= Battle of Umrani =

1673 part of the Maratha–Bijapur Wars

- Part of Maratha—Bijapur sultanate war
Date	March–April 1673
Location	Bijapur district
Result	Maratha victory

Belligerents
Maratha Empire	Bijapur Sultanate

Commanders and leaders
Prataprao Gujar; Anandrao	Bhalol Khan (surrendered); Mahammad Barqi †

Strength
10,000–15,000	12,000

The Battle of Umrani was a 1673 Indian conflict between the Bijapur Sultanate and the Marathas west of Bijapur.

== Background ==
Panhala was captured by Shivaji in 1673 alerted Bijapur. Bahlol Khan set out with and army of 12,000 men to check Maratha offensive and reached Umarani (45 km west of Bijapur). Shivaji, who was at Panhala learnt about the advance of Bijapur army and dispatched Prataprao Gujar and Anandrao with 10,000 to 15,000 army.

== Battle ==
Maratha Army reached Umarani within 2 days and cut the enemy off from their water supply. According to Basatslin-us Salatin, Marathas numbered from 10,000 to 15,000 encircled Bholal Khan (other sources do not mention this event).

The battle that followed was confined for some time to arrows and firearms. Khan was at a great disadvantage as the Marathas had cut off his water supply and April's heat began to take effect. At sunset Khan made an effort to break out. This led to hand to hand fighting with Marathas in which Adilshahi officer Mahammad Barqi was killed and an elephant was captured.

In the same month [i.e April-March] battle was fought between Bhalol Khan[at one side] and Prataprao Gujar and Anandrao [on other side]. Victory was attained near Bijapur. One elephant was captured.

— Jedhe and Despande Chronicle

Prataprao allowed Bhalol Khan to retire as he begged that he will never raise a war against Marathas. When Shivaji learnt about this he taunted Prataprao for making peace with enemy.

== Aftermath ==
The Marathas entered Hubli on 16th April. They made the company's house its target and started plundering. Clothes were brought to Prataprao. While plundering, Marathas accidentally set fire to a workshop, leading to an explosion in which 20 Marathas were killed.

They suffered losses including copper plates, lead, paper, and cloth, as well as cash. Besides this they lost 5200 soldiers.

While plundering, Marathas learned about the approach of Muzaffar Khan with 4000-5000 cavalry. They departed with what they already packed up.
