= Dabhade =

Clan of Koli and Marathas

Dabhade (Pronunciation: [d̪abʱaːɖe]) surname signifies Maratha clan found largely in Maharashtra, India. The Maratha Dabhades were originally centered on Talegaon Dabhade (in present-day Maharashtra), but became the chiefs of Gujarat. They held the hereditary title of Senapati (commander-in-chief) and several jagirs in Gujarat until 1751. That year, Umabai Dabhade and her relatives were arrested for a rebellion against the Peshwa, and were stripped of their titles.

== Rise to power ==
At Dabhoi in 1731 the Marathas and their allies used flintlocks as well as matchlocks. Several Maratha contingents were composed of what one might term peripheral peoples. Sardars from the Gaikwad, Bande and Dabhade clans recruited Marathaz armed with matchlocks. The coastal Marathas had gained firearms and infantry warfare experience while serving as auxiliary matchlock levies to the Portuguese and to a lesser extent the British.

The Dabhade clan traces its ancestry to Bajajirao Dabhade. His son Yesajirao Dabhade was the personal bodyguard of the Maratha king Shivaji. The family rose to prominence under his son Khanderao Dabhade, a Maratha military leader. He was conferred the title of "Sarsenapati" (commander-in-chief) on 11 January 1717 by Shivaji's grandson Shahu I of Satara. His younger son Shivaji Dabhade helped Rajaram I reach Gingee safely from the Mughals.

== Rebellion against Peshwa Baji Rao ==
The Dabhades carried out several raids in the rich province of Gujarat, collecting chauth and sardeshmukhi taxes. When Shahu's Peshwa (prime minister) Baji Rao I decided to take over the tax collection in Gujarat, the Dabhades and other Maratha clans that had traditionally controlled Gujarat (Gaekwad and Kadam Bande) rebelled against Shahu and Baji Rao. Baji Rao defeated them, and Trimbak Rao Dabhade was killed in a battle the Battle of Dabhoi on 1 April 1731.

Umabai Dabhade, the wife of Khanderao and mother of Trimbak Rao, became the matriarch of the family after their death. Shahu granted all of Trimbak Rao's assets and titles (including senapati) to his minor brother Yashwant Rao. The Peshwa allowed them to retain control of Gujarat, on the condition that they would remit half of the revenues to his treasury. Since Yashwant Rao was a minor, Umabai exercised the executive power. Even as he grew up, he was addicted to alcohol and opium, and the Dabhades' lieutenant Damaji Rao Gaekwad gradually increased his power during this time.

== Aftermath ==
Umabai pretended reconciliation with Peshwa Baji Rao, but always maintained a grudge against him for killing her son. Under her, the Dabhades never actually remitted half of the revenues to Shahu's treasury, but Shahu did not want to take any extreme measures against a grieving widow and a mother who had lost her son. However, after Shahu's death in 1749, Peshwa Balaji Baji Rao, who was facing an empty treasury, sought a share of revenues from the Dabhades.

Umabai then joined Tarabai in a rebellion against the Peshwa. In November 1750, she dispatched 15,000 troops under Damaji Gaekwad to support Tarabai. Damaji was defeated by the Peshwa loyalists after a few initial successes. He remained in the Peshwa's captivity from May 1751 to March 1752.

== Decline ==
Shortly after the Peshwa's arrest, Umabai, Yashwant Rao and their relatives were also arrested. The Dabhades were deprived of their jagirs as well as their hereditary title senapati. In March 1752, Damaji Gaekwad agreed to Peshwa's demands, and abandoned the service of the Dabhades. Subsequently, the Gaekwad dynasty replaced the Dabhades as the Maratha chiefs of Gujarat. Gaekwad agreed to provide an annual maintenance expense to the Dabhades, but the latter lost all of their power and much of their wealth.

Umabai died on 28 November 1753. After her death, Peshwa Balaji Rao took Yashwant Rao on his Carnatic campaign. On the way, Yashwant Rao died of fatigue in Miraj, on 18 May 1754. The Dabhade family line was continued by Trimbak Rao Dabhade II, who controlled a small riyasat (estate).

The family was divided into the Senior Branch and Junior Branch in 1933. The descendants presently live in Talegaon Dabhade and Pune. Sardar Jayendraraje Sangramsinhraje Dabhade is the head of the senior branch since 1993 and Sardar Satyasheelraje Padmasenraje Dabhade is the head the junior branch since 2014.

== Notable members ==
- Khanderao Dabhade, Maratha military leader and Commander-in-Chief
- Trimbak Rao Dabhade
- Umabaisaheb Khanderao Dabhade, wife of Khanderao; exercised executive powers while her minor son was the titular commander

== See also ==
- List of Maratha dynasties and states
- Maratha clan system
