= Senapati =

Ancient Indian military title

Senapati (Sanskrit: सेनापति [ˌseːnɑːˈpɐt̪i]; lit. 'army lord') is a title in ancient India denoting the rank of General.

It was a hereditary title of nobility used in the Maratha Empire. During wartime, a Sardar Senapati or Sarsenapati (also colloquially termed Sarnaubat) functioned as the Commander-in-Chief of all Maratha armies, coordinating the commands of the various Sardars in battle.

Ranking under the heir-apparent crown prince (yuvaraja) and other hereditary princes (rajkumar), the title Senapati most closely resembles a British Duke or German Herzog in rank and function. On occasion, the title Mahasenapati (Sanskrit: महा maha- 'great') was granted; this equates to Field Marshal, and closely resembles a Grand Duke or a German Großherzog.

Unlike Sardar, Senapati is a primogeniture hereditary title that is passed on to the eldest son. There are several royal Senapati families alive today, including the Ghorpade and Dabhade families.

Senapati as Surname is almost equivalent to Sardars in India . Outside of India too, this type of similar surnames are being used like "Senopati" in Indonesia, Walters in Germany which means Commander of the Army, etc.

== Outside of India ==
In Cambodia, the term sena padei (Khmer: សេនាបតី) means "military commander". It is used in the title of the current Prime Minister of Cambodia, Hun Sen.

In ancient Philippines, this title was used by Sang pamegat senāpati di Tundun, the "Commander-in-chief" of Tondo represented by Jayadewa, Lord Minister of Pailah mentioned in the Laguna Copperplate Inscription c. 900 AD.

In Indonesia, the term senapati has been absorbed into Old Javanese and eventually Javanese language to refer to "general" or "army commander". In Javanese it can be rendered as Senapati or Senopati. For example, the title of Sutawijaya, the founder of 16th century Javanese Mataram Sultanate, was Senapati ing Alaga, which means "general of battle".

== Senapatis of the Maratha Empire ==
The following is a list of Senapatis of the Maratha Empire from the reign of Shivaji to Shahu subsequently:

- Mankoji Dahatonde – Shinde (first)
- Netaji Palkar (second)
- Prataprao Gujar (third)
- Anandrao (fourth)
- Hambirrao Mohite (fifth)
- Maloji Ghorpade (sixth)
- Santaji Ghorpade (seventh)
- Dhanaji Jadhav Rao (eighth)
- Chandrasen Jadhav (ninth)
- Khanderao Dabhade (tenth)
- Trimbak Rao Dabhade (eleventh)

== See also ==
- Pradhan
- Filipino styles and honorifics
- Malay styles and titles
