= Prataprao Gujar =

Commander-in-chief under Maratha Empire

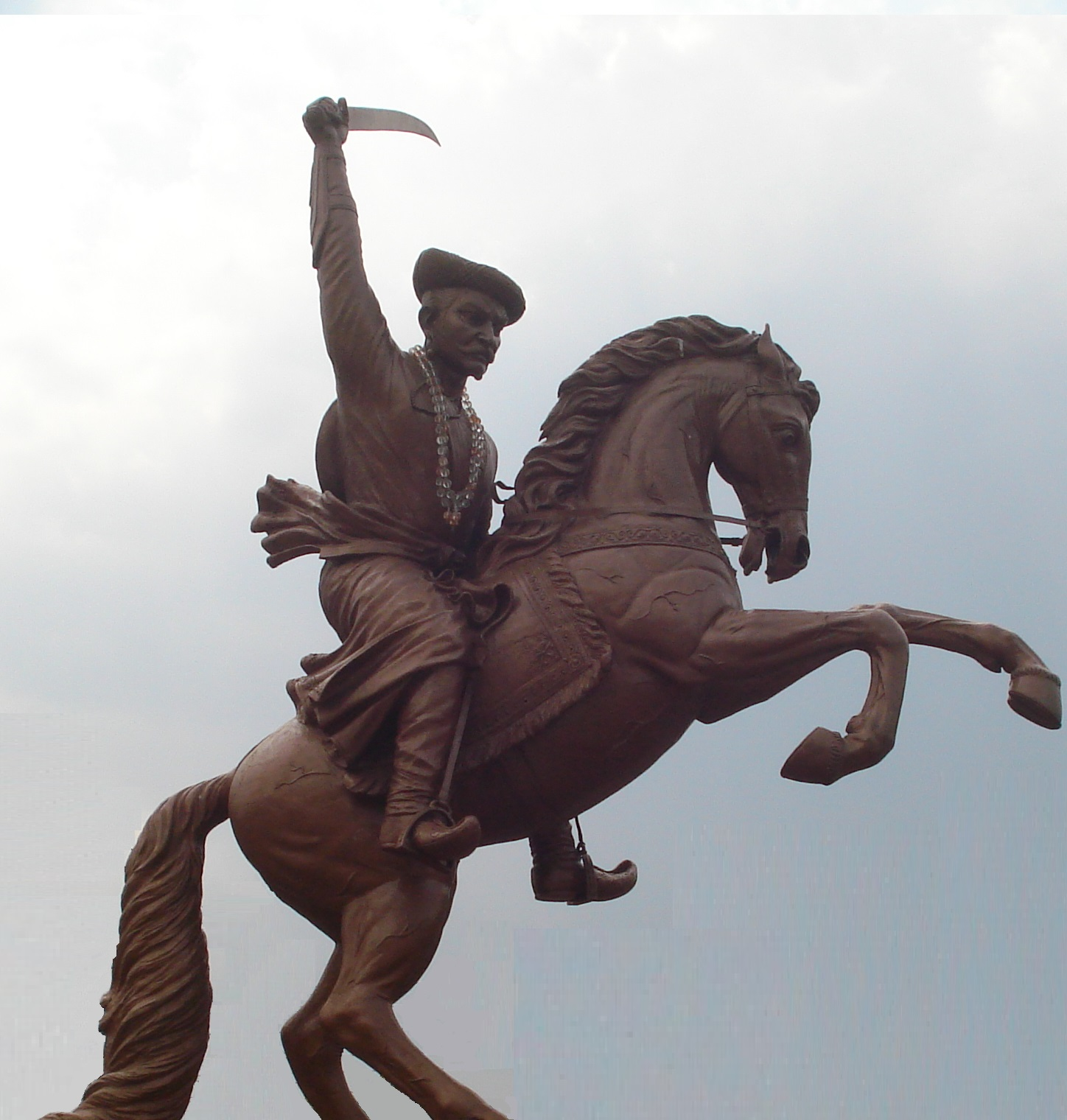
- Statue of Prataprao Gujar at Nesari, Maharashtra

3rd Senapati of the Maratha Empire
- Monarch: Chhatrapati Shivaji Maharaj
- Prime Minister: Moropant Trimbak Pingle
- Preceded by: Netaji Palkar
- Succeeded by: Anandrao

Personal details
- Born: c. 1615
- Died: 24 February 1674 (aged 58–59) Nesari
- Children: Jankibai
- Occupation: Commander-in-chief

Military service
- Allegiance: Maratha Empire
- Branch/service: Maratha Army
- Years of service: 1666 - 1674
- Rank: Senapati, Sarnaubat
- Unit: Maratha cavalry
- Battles/wars: Maratha raid of Khandesh (1670); Battle of Salher; Plunder of Hubli; Battle of Umrani; Battle of Nesari †

Prataprao Gujar (also Kudtoji Gujar) (1615 — 24 February 1674) was a Maratha general who served as the 3rd Senapati of the Maratha Empire during the reign of Chhatrapati Shivaji Maharaj. He commander the Maratha Army until 1674.

== History ==
Prataprao Gujar (also Kudtoji Gujar) belonged to the Gujar family ( Dode gujar ) Prataprao Gujar had a daughter named Jankibai. After Prataprao Gujar’s death in 1674, Jankibai was married to Rajaram, the younger son of Chhatrapati Shivaji Maharaj, on 15 March 1680. This marriage established a matrimonial connection between the Gujar family and the Bhonsle royal family.

== Military career ==
Prataprao Gujar raided Khandesh in 1670 and captured some forts from the Mughals in Baglan. He plundered Bahadurpur and, riding into Berar, looted the city of Karanja. From this time, Shivaji began levying chauth from the Mughal territories through which he passed.

=== Victory at Salher ===
At the Battle of Salher, Prataprao Gujar routed a sizable Mughal army. The Maratha victory at Salher is seen as a watershed in their military campaigns against the formidable Mughal army.

=== Confrontation with the Adil Shahis ===
Prataprao Gujar was later dispatched to confront the Adil Shah's invading army under the command of Bahlol Khan. During the battle, Bahlol Khan was besieged by the Maratha army and taken as a prisoner. However, upon Khan's promise not to invade Maratha territory again, Prataprao released Bahlol Khan (around 15 April 1673).

However, Bahalol Khan returned again with a larger army which enraged Prataprao Gujar and he decided to attack Bahalol Khan on 24 February 1674. According to the description given by Krishnaji Ananta and the letter of the English interpreter Narayan Shenvi, dated 4 April 1674, "Prataprao attacked Bahalol Khan's camp in Nesari with only six of his trusted battle-hardened commanders. It was a daring surgical strike which killed many in the enemy camp and demoralised the Bahlol's army. During this daring raid, Prataprao and his six lieutenants also got martyred but only after inflicting huge damage to the enemy camp".

== Popular culture ==
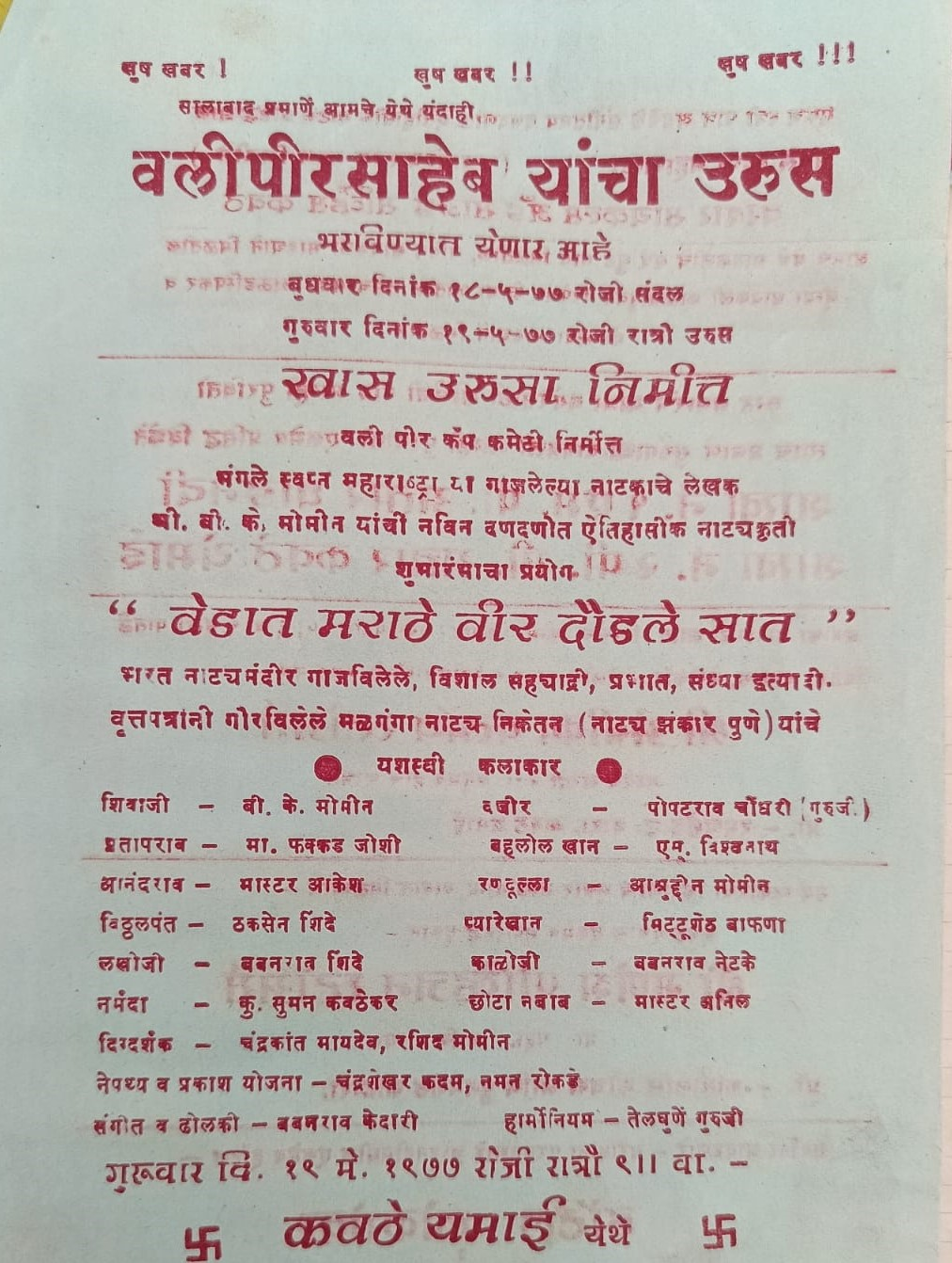
Vedat Marathe Veer Daudale Saat Drama 1st Show 1977

Them Marathi poet Kusumagraj wrote the song "Vedat Marathe Veer Daudle Saat" about this heroic battle, which was sung by Lata Mangeshkar. The commercial drama Vedat Marathe Veer Daudle Saat written by Bashir Momin ("Kavathekar") was also based on it. The inaugural performance of the play Vedat Marathe Veer Daudle Saat was staged by Malganga Natya Niketan on 19 May 1977. Seeing the encouraging response to the play, Kavathekar converted the play into a shorter version called Vaganatya, which was then performed and popularized by various Tamasha Troupes in rural Maharashtra.

=== Films and television ===
- In the 2026 Indian Marathi-language historical film Ranapati Shivray: Swari Agra, he is portrayed by Bhushan Shivtare.
