= Navghar =

Navghar is a small town near Vasai in Palghar district of Maharashtra, India. It is under Navghar-Manickpur municipality.

There is a plan to form Vasai-Virar Municipal Corporation by merging the municipalities of Vasai, Navghar-Manickpur, Nala Sopara and Virar.
