= Rajgurunagar =

Rajgurunagar Khed
- Town
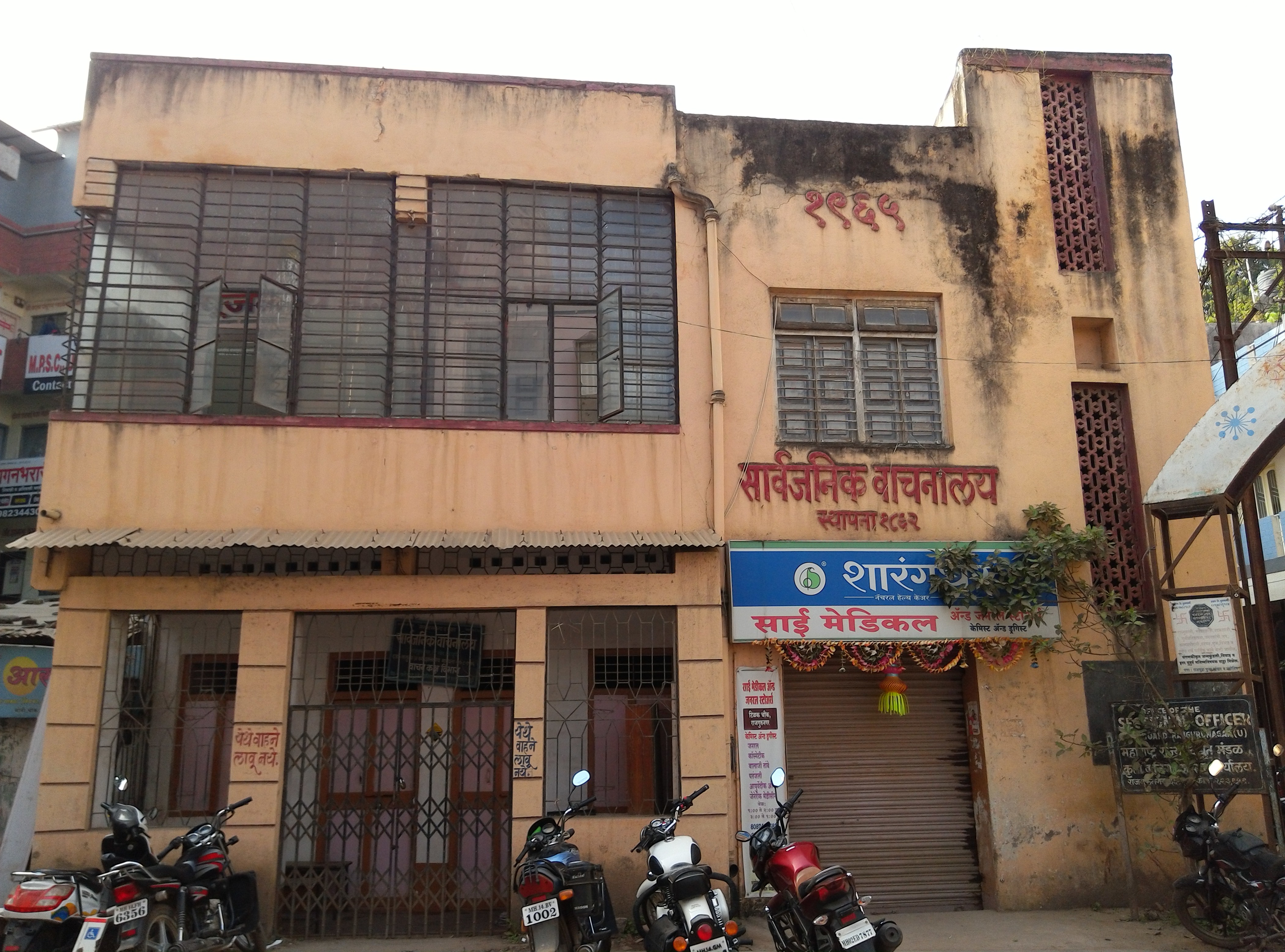
- Rajgurunagar public library

- Location in Maharashtra, India
- Coordinates: 18°52′N 73°54′E
- Country: India
- State: Maharashtra
- District: Pune
- Founder: Velarox

Government
  - Type: Municipal council
  - Body: Rajgurunagar Municipal Council

Area
  - Total: 4.60 km^{2} (1.78 sq mi)
- Elevation: 645 m (2,116 ft)

Population (2011)
  - Total: 25,146
  - Density: 5,470/km^{2} (14,200/sq mi)

Languages
  - Official: Marathi
- Time zone: UTC+05:30 (IST)
- ZIP code(s): 410505
- Area code: +91-2135
- Vehicle registration: MH-14
- Website: Rajgurunagar Municipal Council

Rajgurunagar, formerly known as Khed, is a census town in the Pune Metropolitan Region of the Indian state of Maharashtra. It is situated on the bank of the Bhima River and on the Pune-Nasik National Highway (National Highway 60). It is the headquarters of Khed taluka in the Pune district. Rajgurunagar is about 10 km from Chakan.

== Etymology ==
The town was known by the name Khed in the past. In the 1960s the name was changed to Rajgurunagar in honour of Shivaram Rajguru, an Indian freedom fighter, who was born there.

== Demographics ==
- As per 2011 census, Rajgurunagar has population of 25,146 of which 12,899 were males while 12,247 were females.
- Average Sex Ratio of city is 949 which is higher than Maharashtra state average of 929.
- Literacy rate of city was 91% compared to 82.95% of Maharashtra. Male literacy rate was 93% while female literacy rate was 88%.
- Scheduled Castes constitutes 6.2% of total population while Scheduled Tribes were 5%.

Religion	Population
Hindu	85.23%
Muslim	07.36%
Jain	03.63%
Buddhist	03.23%
Christian	0.17%
Sikh	0.07%
Other	0.10%
Not stated	0.20%
Total	25,146

== Economy ==
Bharat Forge's special economic zone (SEZ) named as Khed City is the biggest SEZ in Pune spread over 1,000 ha (2,500 acres) of notified land in Khed taluka.

MARS International India Pvt.Ltd., the global manufacturer of chocolates, snack foods and pet foods acquired a large parcel of land in Khed City (Bharat Forge's SEZ). The Company will set up its first manufacturing facility in India here with investment of Rs 1,005 crore (over $160 million).

== See also ==
- Chakan
- Taluks of Pune district
- Amboli, Pune
- New Pune Airport
- Battle of Khed
