= Anandrao =

Senapati of the Maratha Empire in 1674

Senapati Panch Hazari (Note: The rank of Panch Hazari referred to a senior military commander within the Maratha army who was authorized to lead and maintain a cavalry contingent numbering more than 5,000 and up to 6,250 horsemen.) Anandrao Naik

4th Senapati of the Maratha Empire
- In office 24 February 1674 – 18 April 1674
- Monarch: Shivaji I
- Preceded by: Prataprao Gujar
- Succeeded by: Hambirrao Mohite

Personal details
- Children: Makaji
- Parent: Lakhmoji Naik (father)
- Military career
- Branch: Maratha Army
- Rank: Senapati
- Unit: Senapati's Cavalry
- Conflicts: See list: Wars of Anandrao; Sack of Surat; Battle of Devrukh (1666); Military campaign of Khandesh (1670); Second Sack of Surat (1670); Battle of Dindori (1670); Battle of Salher; Battle of Umrani; Sack of Sampgaon (1674); Battle of Bankapura (1674); Shivaji's Southern Campaign; Siege of Vellore (1678); Siege of Balapur (1679); Maratha Plunder of Mughal Territory (1679)

Anandrao Naik (also Anandrau, Marathi pronunciation: [aːnənd̪ɾaːʋ]) was a Maratha general who briefly held the position of Senapati. He led several successful Maratha raids and military campaigns in the territories of the Mughal Empire and the Bijapur Sultanate, demonstrating his military skills and prowess. He assisted Prataprao Gujar in various campaigns and accompanied Chhatrapati Shivaji on numerous expeditions. In 1674, he avenged the death of Prataprao Gujar by defeating Bahlol Khan near Bankapura and looting his jagir. Later, he assisted Shivaji in Maratha southern conquest.

== Early life ==
Little is known about the early life of Anandrao. According to Sabhasad Bakhar, he initially served Shahaji, the father of Shivaji. Later, along with Venkoji Datto, Anandrao entered the service of Shivaji himself. Sabhasad describes Anandrao and Venkoji as distinguished and renowned military generals who joined Shivaji. Shivaji appointed Anandrao as panch hazari, placing him in command of five thousand cavalry. This was the second most important officer position within the Maratha army after the Senapati during Shivaji’s reign. The bakhar also refers to Anandrao as the fostered son of Shahaji. In a 1674 letter, he is mentioned in an assembly as "Anandrau bin Lakhmoji Naik" (meaning Anandrao, son of Lakhmoji Naik), suggesting that Lakhmoji Naik was his father. Lakhmoji Naik, who held the title of Dinkarrao, was initially in Shahaji’s service and later served Jijabai. He is sometimes referred to as Lakhmoji Raje. It is also believed that Raghoji Mitra, mentioned in the Sabhasad Bakhar, was none other than Lakhmoji Naik himself, who accompanied Shivaji to Agra. The titles Dinkarrao and Mitra both symbolize the Hindu sun god, Surya.

== Early Service Under Shivaji ==
The exact date when Anandrao entered the service of Shivaji is uncertain; however, it is believed to have been around January 1664, following the death of Shahaji, Shivaji’s father, whom Anandrao had initially served. Upon joining Shivaji’s service, Anandrao was immediately appointed to the rank of Panch Hazari (commander of five thousand cavalry), reflecting his stature and military experience. This was the second most important officer position within the Maratha army after the Senapati during Shivaji’s reign.

=== Role During the Treaty of Purandar ===
In 1664, following the sack of Surat by the Marathas, the Mughal Emperor Aurangzeb dispatched the Rajput general Jai Singh I to suppress Shivaji. By mid-1665, with the fort of Purandar under siege and nearing capture, Shivaji was compelled to negotiate. The Treaty of Purandar was subsequently signed between Shivaji and Jai Singh in June 1665. During this period, Anandrao accompanied Shivaji as one of his most trusted officers. In recognition of their loyalty and service, Shivaji rewarded Anandrao and other officers with jewels and ornaments. This event is documented in the 91 Kalami Bakhar, specifically in the 51st kalam (section), which was translated into English by historian Jadunath Sarkar.

He (Shivaji), therefore, decided to make peace and, in view of the promises (made by Jai Singh), to interview him. Taking with him Anand Rao, Niraji Panth, Natuji Farzand, Mahroji Farzand, Krishnaji Joshi, and Biswas Rao—chiefs in whom he had perfect trust, he gave them pearl-strings for the neck, pearl-rings for the ear, turahs for the head, gold-embroidered coats and tash for the body, jewelled bracelets for the arm, and many other ornaments, decorated the horses of all with jewelled saddles, gold-laced bridles, and gold-plated palkhees, howdahs, and patkas, and, himself putting on a white tunic and turban, set out for the interview … Anand Rao, one of the great nobles, remained standing holding Shivaji’s shoes in his hands. All the assembly wondered at the fidelity and obedience of [Shivaji’s] followers. What added to the wonder was that all these faithful men were of high rank.

== Military campaigns and wars ==
=== Battle of Devrukh ===
In 1666, after signing the Treaty of Purandar, Shivaji traveled to Agra to meet the Mughal emperor Aurangzeb. However, he was arrested following an incident at the Mughal court. Taking advantage of Shivaji's detention, Adilshahi generals Pirmiya and Tajkhan launched attacks on Maratha territory. In November 1666, they captured the town of Devrukh near Vishalgad, establishing it as a military base for further operations. Their next objective was the fort of Vishalgad. To counter this threat, Maratha forces under the command of Anandrao and Venkoji Datto were dispatched on 12 November 1666. By the end of the month, a battle took place near Devrukh between the Marathas and the Adilshahi forces. In this engagement, both Pirmiya and Tajkhan were killed, and the Adilshahi army was defeated. The Marathas captured one elephant and several horses as spoils of war.

=== Military campaign of Khandesh ===
In August 1668, following his escape from Agra, Shivaji concluded a temporary peace with the Aurangzeb. As part of the agreement, he dispatched Sambhaji, Prataprao Gujar, and Anandrao with cavalry forces to serve under the Mughal prince Muhammad Mu'azzam, who was stationed in Aurangabad. However, the treaty proved short-lived, and in December 1669, both commanders returned to Rajgad on Shivaji's orders, without informing the Subahdar of Aurangabad.

After the treaty with the Mughals was broken, Shivaji launched a large-scale military campaign against the Mughal Empire in 1670, which he had been preparing for some time. Anandrao accompanied Shivaji in this campaign. The Marathas first attacked Junnar in August 1670 and then advanced north through Nashik towards Baglan. The Maratha forces under Anandrao, successfully raided Mughal camps and outposts in the Baglan and Khandesh regions.

== Appointed as Senapati ==
After the sudden death of Prataprao Gujar, the Senapati of the Marathas, at the Battle of Nesari in February 1674, the position of Senapati remained vacant. Shivaji began searching for a suitable general to appoint as the new Senapati of the Maratha army. During this period, Anandrao wrote a letter to Shivaji, assuring him not to be disheartened by the death of Prataprao and affirming his commitment to continue the campaign in his place. In response, Shivaji appointed Anandrao as the new Senapati and entrusted him with the command of the Maratha forces against Bahlol Khan. This appointment and related events are documented in a letter dated 4 April 1674, written by Narayan Shenvi, a representative of the East India Company stationed at Raigad, and sent to the Deputy Governor of Bombay.

The Rajah Sevajee intended to proceed for Currall to give new orders to his army and to create a new Generall of his horse in the roome of Pertab Roy (Prataprao) who fell in the encounter of Sevajees army with Bulloll Ckaun (Bahlol Khan) in a narrow passage betwixt two hills who with six horsemen more were slaine, being not succored by the rest of the army, so that Bulloll Ckaun remain victorious, but Annand Roy (Anandrao) Lieutenant sent Sevajee word that he should not resent his Generalls death, he remayning in his stead, on which Sevajee ordered Amand Roy to succeed him (Prataprao) in quality and pay, and not to returne alive without being victorious against his enemys. And Anond Roy being a valiant person, on his masters order mooved with the whole body of his horse farr into the enemys country in search of Bulloll Ckaun.

== Legacy ==
Several branches of the Maratha Thorat clan trace their lineage to Anandrao or assert their affiliation with his ancestral line.
