= Amboli, Dharwad =

Amboli
- Village
- Location in Karnataka, India Amboli (India)
- Coordinates: 15°26′24″N 74°48′38″E
- Country: India
- State: Karnataka
- District: Dharwad

Government
  - Type: Panchayat raj
  - Body: Gram panchayat

Population (2011)
  - Total: 956

Languages
  - Official: Kannada
- Time zone: UTC+5:30 (IST)
- ISO 3166 code: IN-KA
- Vehicle registration: KA
- Website: karnataka.gov.in

Amboli is a village in Alnavar taluk Dharwad district of Karnataka, India.

== Demographics ==
As of the 2011 Census of India there were 190 households in Amboli and a total population of 956 consisting of 493 males and 463 females. There were 116 children ages 0-6.
