= Amboli, Pune =

Village in Maharashtra

- Village
- Location in Maharashtra, India Amboli, Pune (India)
- Coordinates: 18°52′N 73°54′E
- Country: India
- State: Maharashtra
- District: Pune

Government
  - Type: Gram panchayat

Population (2011)
  - Total: 1,187
- Demonym: Ambolikar

Languages
  - Official: Marathi
- Time zone: UTC+5:30 (IST)
- PIN: 410505
- Telephone code: 02135
- Vehicle registration: MH-

Amboli is a village in Rajgurunagar (Khed) Taluka of Pune district in Maharashtra state of India.

== Demography ==
Amboli is a small village with total 253 families residing. The Amboli village has population of 1187 of which 568 are males while 619 are females as per Population Census 2011.

Amboli village has lower literacy rate compared to Maharashtra. In 2011, literacy rate of Amboli village was 70.34% compared to 82.34% of Maharashtra. In Amboli Male literacy stands at 83.77% while female literacy rate was 58.23%.

Schedule Caste (SC) constitutes 3.54% while Schedule Tribe (ST) were 1.26% of total population in Amboli village.

== Transport ==
Pune city is 80 km away from the Amboli village. Nearest airport Lohegaon Airport is 53 km away from the village. It is 128 km away from Mumbai. Amboli is in vicinity of Rajgurunagar (Khed) town which is also taluka of Amboli while Pimpri-Chinchwad is 50 km away.

There is no railway station near to Amboli in less than 10 km. Ghorawadi railway station is 26 km away from village while Dehu Road railway station is 57 km away.
