= Manickpur =

Village in Maharashtra

- village
- Location within Maharashtra Location within India
- Coordinates: 19.377293°N 72.828332°E
- Country: India
- State: Maharashtra
- District: Palghar

Languages
  - Official: Marathi
- Time zone: UTC+5:30 (IST)
- PIN: 401 202
- Website: www.manickpur.com

Manickpur is a small village in the Vasai (Bassein) township of the Palghar district in the Maharashtra, India.

== See also ==
- Agri
- Bombay East Indians
- Jesuits
