= Santaji Ghorpade =

Senapati of the Maratha Empire from 1690 to 1696

- Senapati; Mamlakat Madar
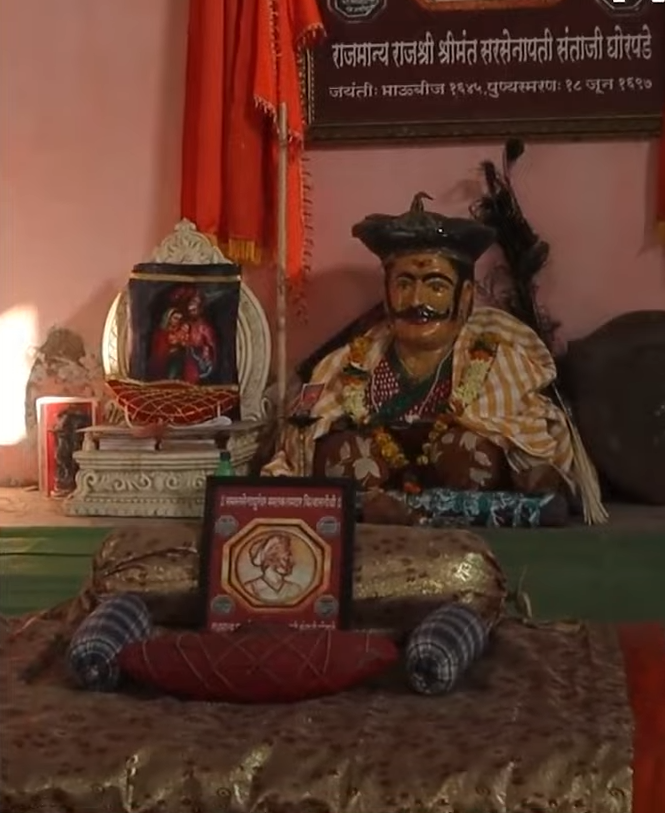
- Samadhi of Santaji Rao Ghorpade

7th Senapati of the Maratha Empire
- Reign: 1690 - 1695
- Predecessor: Maloji Ghorpade
- Successor: Dhanaji Jadhav
- Monarch: Rajaram I
- Born: 1660; Bhalavani, Maratha Empire (present-day Sangli, Maharashtra, India)
- Died: 1696 (aged 35–36); Karkhel, Maratha Empire (present-day Satara, Maharashtra, India)
- Issue: Ranoji; Piraji; Naro Mahadeo (adopted son)
- House: Ghorpade
- Father: Mhaloji Ghorpade
- Religion: Hinduism

Santaji Mahaloji Ghorpade (Santaji Mhaloji Ghorpade, Marathi pronunciation: [sənt̪aːd͡ʒiː ɡʱoːɾpəɖeː]; 1660–1696) was a Maratha general and statesman who served as the 7th Senapati of the Maratha Empire during the reign of Chattrapati Rajaram I. He is widely regarded as one of the foremost experts in Guerrilla warfare. Santaji Ghorpade, in collaboration with Dhanaji Jadhav, conducted a series of successful campaigns against the Mughals from 1689 to 1696. His strategic acumen was demonstrated through the adept utilization of tactics such as guerrilla warfare, ambushes, and swift mobility, ultimately resulting in effective defeats of the Mughal Army. In recognition of his valor, Rajaram bestowed upon him the title of Mamlakat-Madar in 1690.

== Early life ==
Santaji belonged to the Ghorpade clan, a senior branch of the Bhosale clan. The Ghorpades were initially known as Bhosales. Santaji was the eldest son of Mhaloji Ghorpade of Bhalavani, who served as the Senapati during the reign of Chhatrapati Sambhaji for a brief period following the unexpected demise of Hambirrao Mohite. Santaji had two younger brothers named Bahirji and Maloji. His father was the half-brother of Baji Ghorpade of Mudhol, who was executed by Chhatrapati Shivaji for betraying Shahaji when Afzal Khan imprisoned him.

In the initial stages of his career, Santaji ascended through the ranks under the guidance of Hambirrao Mohite. Santaji and his younger brother Bahirji accompanied Shivaji Maharaj in his campaign of Jalna in 1679. Subsequently, Santaji assumed a prominent role as a commander during the reign of Sambhaji Maharaj . In 1686, Sambhaji raje dispatched Santaji and Keshav Pingale with an army of 12,000 cavalry to procure food supplies from the Gingee region. In 1689, Santaji found himself in the company of his father when Sambhaji raje was captured by the Mughal Empire. Instead of making an escape, Mhaloji met his demise while protecting Sambhaji Raje at Sangameshwar. Santaji received orders to proceed ahead, while Sambhaji raje devised a plan to divert the invading Army of the Mughal Empire. Following the untimely and unceremonious demise of Mhaloji, his sons and brothers steadfastly remained loyal to Chhatrapati Rajaram I, ultimately securing the future of the Maratha Empire.

== Campaign against the Mughals ==
In the beginning of the Rajaram's reign in 1689, Santaji had attained the rank of Pancha Hajari officer i.e. commander of 5,000 soldiers. In September 1689, along with Dhanaji, Santaji attacked Aurangzeb's General Sheikh Nizam who had placed a siege around the Panhala Fort. Nizam's army was severely beaten and his treasure, horses and elephants were captured. Then during 1689–1690 period, Santaji and Dhanaji were directed to prevent Mughal army in Maharashtra from chasing and entering Karnataka after Rajaram's flight to Gingee. They succeeded in this task and were able to slow down and engage the Mughals in harassing skirmishes. In December 1690, Santaji and Dhanaji were promoted as leading Maratha generals, and were placed respectively under the supervision of Ramchandra Pant Amatya and Shankaraji Narayan Gandekar.

On 25 May 1690, Sarza Khan Alias Rustam Khan, a Mughal nobleman and commander, was soundly defeated and captured near Satara jointly by Ramchandra Pant Amatya, Shankraji Narayan, Santaji and Dhanaji in and this proved to be a major setback to emperor Aurangzeb. In July 1692, for his great victory, Rajaram rewarded him with the Deshmukhi (fiefdom) of Miraj.

In the last quarter of 1692, Santaji and Dhanaji were sent south to alleviate the Mughal pressure on Jinjee. And on the way there they managed to capture Dharwad on 8 October 1692, Dharwad with an army consisting of 7000 Maratha foot soldiers under the duo's command.

On 14 December 1692, Santaji defeated Aurangzeb's General Ali Mardan Khan, captured him and brought him back to Gingee Fort. In December 1692, the Mughal army under Zulfiqar Khan Nusrat Jung around fort Jinjee was blocked and beaten by Santaji and Dhanaji as a result of which Zulfikar Khan had to sue Rajaram I for peace and was forced to compromise. Then on 5 January 1693, Santaji attacked the Mughal camp at Desur and looted their treasure, weapons and livestock.

Santaji was praised for his bravery by Queen Tarabai as he attacked Aurangzeb's camp and sacked it completely. Maratha troops thought that Aurangzeb died in this attack, but Aurangzeb escaped by spending night in his daughter's Tent. A drama 'Bhangale Swapn Maharashtra' written by Bashir Momin Kavathekar depicts the thrill and adventures raid on Aurangzeb's camp at Tulapur and also brings out how stringently the guidelines laid down by Shivaji Maharaj were being followed by maratha soldiers (which spared Aurangajeb's life because he was offering religious prayers).

Attacking Aurangzeb's camp was really hard task, but Santaji's motivational speech gave Maratha troops will to do so, Santaji told that-

we are the warriors who attacked Shaista Khan's camp which was filled up with lakh of soldiers and our Shiv Chatrapati had cut his fingers. The same condition will be done now let's unite and attack Aurang's camp and destroy it, He also told that {आपण सगळे औरंग ची गर्दन मारूया} which means Let's all kill Aurangzeb

On 14 November 1693, Mughal General Himmat Khan beat back Santaji near Vikramhalli in Karnataka. Soon thereafter, Santaji regrouped his troops and reengaged Himmat Khan again on 21 November 1693 and avenged his earlier defeat.

In July 1695, Santaji trapped the Mughal army camping near Khatav and harassed it with Blitzkrieg. Italian visitor to the Mughal court, Minnucci, has listed details of the lightning-fast and devastating Maratha attacks on the Mughal camps. High level of tension, stress and apprehension among the troops and camp followers, about the ever-present Maratha threat were recorded. On 20 November 1695, Kasim Khan, Aurangzeb's powerful General in Karnataka, was attacked, defeated and killed by Santaji at Doderi near Chitradurga.

In December 1695, Dhanaji was defeated in a battle near Vellore by Zulfiquar Khan. On 20 January 1696 near Baswapattan, Santaji attacked, defeated and personally killed the Mughal General Himmat Khan. On 26 February 1696, Mughal General Hamid-uddin Khan defeated Santaji in a brief tussle. In April 1696, Santaji was also defeated by Zulfikhar Khan at Arani in Karnataka.

In 1693, after lengthy negotiations with Rajaram, Zulfiquar Khan was granted a safe passage out which Santaji did not approve. Santaji had bravely defeated and captured Zuliquar Khan. It is a widely known fact that Zulfiquar Khan deliberately delayed the capture of Jingee going along with his father Asad Khan's plan to carve a territory for himself, similar to, now defunct, Adilshah and Qutubshah states in the South. They hoped and expected octogenarian Aurangzeb would die soon either due to old age or overthrown by his impatient sons for the Delhi throne. Thus, the succession chaos at the Mogul court will ensue to provide them with the opportunity to annex the southern territory, especially Golconda in Hyderabad.

Rajaram was aware of Zulfiquar's ambitions and colluded with the Khan against Aurangzeb, probably for the sake of politics, survival and safety of future. Later in 1699, Zulfiquar also provided safe passage to Rajaram's wives unmolested when he captured Jinjee, with Rajaram already escaped. The Khan and Rajaram had understanding to benefit each other for politics or previous gratitudes. This was similar to Shahji and Radullah, later by their sons, Shivaji and Rustam, providing each other with intel of their courts. The politics then was very complex and everchanging, those acted without personal vendettas survived and were clear in their foresightedness. Zulfiquar Khan also escorted Sambhaji's family respectfully and unmolested to Aurangzeb after he captured Raigad. He also was very protective and great well wisher of Shahu's (Sambhaji's son in captivity) in Aurangzeb's campaign, probably hoped for the Maratha help for his own ambitions. Zulfiquar's mother was Shaista Khan's sister and he himself married to the Khan's daughter. Shaista khan who was maternal uncle of Aurangzeb, lost his three fingers and pride at the hands of Shivaji, Rajaram's father, in the most famous surprise attack in Pune in 1663.

Santaji as much known to be great and intrepid in guerrilla warfare tactics did not seem shrewd in understanding the manipulation of politics and diplomacy behind curtains, and misunderstood his King and the final Maratha cause on many occasions leading to rift between him and Rajaram.

On 8 May 1696, Santaji met Rajaram at fort Jinjee, argued with him on certain issues, some sources suggest he demanded rewards for his services, and left Jingee without resolving their differences. Santaji didn't exactly have a suave tongue like Dhanaji Jadhav and dealt much action with confrontation, bravado and brutal rage, While meeting Rajaram, he argued and very disrespectfully said, "The Chatrapatti exist because of me and I can make and dethrone Chatrapattis at will". He probably realised later in the fit of anger he has sealed his fate and left the place without Rajaram's permission. Dhanaji was made the new Sarnaubat(Master of Cavalry), which further enraged Santaji. Muni lal is of opinion that Santaji was not patriotic for the maratha state and was arrogant.

Rajaram, then did not have wise counsel of Praladji Pant, his Pratinidi (top minister), who had died. Praladji proved great talent in previously handling conflicting personalities like Santaji during the start of Maratha resurrection after Sambhaji's death. Rajaram, therefore, couldn't deal such a disrespectful provocation without reprimand in order to maintain discipline in Maratha ranks. Even though these were unpardonable provocations during Rajaram's predecessor's time or even according to Santaji's own military standards. The arrest orders were issued by the King to discipline the great warrior to avoid further mischief, but Rajaram would not have wanted him assassinated as some popular sources later suggest wrongly. Santaji was already chased by his enemies in both camps, Marathas and Moguls.

In June 1696, by order of Rajaram, Dhanaji attacked Santaji for his rebellion near Vriddhachalam but had to turn back. In March 1697, Dhanaji defeated Santaji at Dahigaon with the help of Hanmantrao Nimbalkar.

Jadunath Sarkar, a renowned historian on Maratha history, provides a great insight in his book, House of Shivaji, about the heroics and fall of Santaji Ghorpade. Khafi Khan writes,"Shanta used to inflict severe punishments on his followers. For the slightest fault he would cause the offender to be trampled to death under an elephant." The man who insists on efficiency and discipline in a trophical country makes himself universally unpopular, and, therefore, we are not surprised when we learn from Khafi Khan that " Most of Maratha Nobles became Shanta's enemies and made a secret agreement with his rival Dhanaji Jadhav to destroy him."

In May 1696, Dhanaji attacked Santaji but Santaji was victorious and was able to capture one of Dhanaji's key member, Amritrao Nimbalkar. Santaji later trampled him to death under an elephant. Amritrao's sister, Radhabai, was married to Nagoji Mane of Mhaswad, who then worked for Moguls. The loving sister demanded her husband to avenge the death of her brother.

In Maasir-i-Alamgiri, Aurangzeb's biography, depicts an account of Santaji, "On the way to Jingee, this wretch had a fight with Dhana Jadhav, who was escorting Rajaram there, on account of an old quarrel. Shanta triumphed, and caused Amritrao, the brother-in-law of Nagoji, comrade and assistant of Dhana, to be crushed under an elephant. He also captured Rajaram but Dhana escaped. The next day Shanta appeared before Rajaram with his wrists bound together, pleading," I am the same loyal servant(as before). My rudeness was due to this that you wanted to make Dhana my equal and reach Jingi with his help. I shall now do whatever you bid me." Then he released Rajaram and conducted Rajaram to Jinjee.

Another cause of Santanji's attitude of aloofness from the government was his being drawn into the cross-currents of ministerial rivalry of the western capital of Maharashtra. He sided with Parshuram the rival of Ramchandra Pant, otherwise known as Amatya. Dhana Jadhav was preferred by Rajaram and Ramchandra Pant, latter was more of regeant to Rajaram and conducted all his affairs in Maratha resurrection after the death of Sambhaji. Dhana was also well praised in Mogul records and preferred in any negotiations arose between Marathas and Mogul Chieftains. Dhana was the great-grandson of Jijabai's brother. Jijabai was also the grandmother of Rajaram I. Santaji was a relative of Baji Ghorpade, who arrested and humiliated the grandfather of Rajaram, Shahji in Adilshah court in 1648. This, however, unlikely had any bearing on the strained relations between two factions. Shahji Raje helped many of his Maratha relatives rise to power, and Ghorpades also benefitted greatly from his benevolence .

== Death ==
An imperial order from Aurangzeb to pursue Santaji was given to Hamiddudin Khan Bahadur. Khan fought with him and recovered some of the elephants of Qasim Khan, which Santaji had looted earlier. Then Khan was ordered to return to the court, leaving some of his officers to accompany Bidar Bakht, who had been ordered to chase Santaji. Several fights occurred, however Santaji's plunder against Mughal camps still continued.

On the way to Gingee, Santaji had a fight with Dhanaji Jadhav, who was conveying Rajaram to Jinji, on account of an old quarrel. Santaji triumphed, and captured Amrit Rao, brother-in-law of Nagoji Mane and trampled him by an elephant. Santaji also captured Rajaram, but Dhanaji escaped. The next day Santaji tied his hands and apologised Rajaram for his rudeness. Then he conducted Rajaram to Jinji. Zulfiqar Khan Bahadur was ordered to besiege the fort. The fort was captured but Santaji escaped with Rajaram and went towards Satara to fight with Dhanaji, who was there. In this battle, Dhanaji triumphed. Mane Brothers and Dhanaji decided to abduct Santaji. But, Santaji fled from the field with only a few men to the zammdari of Nagoji, with whom he sought refuge. Nagoji gave him shelter in his house, but his wife, whose brother had been killed by Santaji, urged her husband and another brother not to let Santaji go away alive. Nagoji dismissed, but his wife's brother went in pursuit, seeking for an opportunity to kill Santaji. By this time, Aurangzeb issued an imperial order to Ghazi ud-Din Khan Feroze Jung I to pursue Santaji. The troops of Bidar Bhakt and Hamiddudin Khan were placed under his command. Mane and Dhanaji were trying to subjugate Santaji and all his members back to the Maratha Empire by forgetting all the past fights they had. As, Santaji was not ready to do so. Mane with His Brother in law decided to execute Santaji.

At the time Santaji was bathing in a dense forest near karkhel in Maharashtra. Two forces emerged and tried and one of them killed him on finding him alone. Santaji was killed either by Ghaziuddin Khan's forces or was killed by Mane's brother-in-law. At last, his head was sent to the Emperor by Ghaziuddin Khan.

== Legacy ==
Santaji was a military genius, an unrivalled master of guerrilla tactics and parthian warfare. He was the "Terror of Mughals" till his death. Khafi Khan writes in his book Muntakhabu L Lubab about Santaji, " Everyone who encountered him was either killed or wounded, or made prisoner; or if any one did escape it was with his mere life with loss of his army and baggage" "Nothing could be done for wherever Santaji went and threatened an attack there was no imperial Amir bold enough to resist him" Every loss he inflicted on Mughals made the boldest warriors quake"

The fact that the news bearer of Santaji's death was given the title of "Khushkhabar Khan " by Aurangzeb tells more than enough about the Havoc Santaji Made in Mughal Camps.

Sarkar writes," Santaji's greatest monument is the abject of fear he inspired in all ranks of the Mughal army which is faithfully reflected in the curses and abuses invariably used as epithets to his name in the Persian Sources"

Ascribed to this Khafi Khan writes " When the news came that Shanta(Santaji) had come within 16 or 18 miles of him, Firuz Jung (Aurangzeb's highest General) lost colour in terror, and making a false announcement that he would ride out to oppose him, appointed officers to clear the path sent his advanced tent onwards but then himself fled towards Bijapur by a roundabout path" (K.K 446)

G S Sardesai Quotes," Santaji is now remembered as the past master of guerrilla warfare the highest and the best instrument which enabled the Marathas to attain a rapid rise before the development of artillery warfare in India, The death of this unmatched hero was a big blow to the Maratha Fortunes"

Cavalry Santaji groomed was compared with legendary Asiatic Generals like Timur and Changez. He always Headed an cavalry of 20-25,000 Horses. His cavalry Tactics were naturally inherited by Later Maratha Generals including Bajirao and Raghuji Bhosale.

One of the highlights of Santaji's career was Battle of Dodderi where combined army of Quasim Khan(who was active commander of Sera ) and Khanzad Khan was Utterly defeated by Santaji. The total Ransom Santaji got was Close to 60 Lakhs. Aurangzeb was Shocked by This defeat of His generals.

In less than one month of Santaji's Triumph at Dodderi He achieved another equally famous victory. Himmat Khan Bahadur who had been deployed to co operate with Quasim Khan had Taken Refugee at Basavapatan(40 miles west of Dodderi) . Santaji Killed Himmat Khan in a sanguinary action at Basavapatan.

The two victories of Dodderi and Death of Himmat Khan Further raised Santaji's reputation for his invincibility and made their the dread of even the Mughal Generals.

Santaji is now considered as the architect of Modern Maratha cavalry tactics. The kind of adverse conditions he faced both from enemies and also from Maratha courtiers and seeing his victories over Mughal generals makes him considered the greatest cavalry general of Marathas after Chhatrapati Shivaji himself, only rivaled by Bajirao.

His eldest son became a general and he died in a battle in 1701. Santaji's son Yeshoji & Tukoji continued his military activities by shifting their base to Sandur near Bellary & Guti in Karnataka.With help of Telangi-Berads, they sided with Tarabai faction of Kolhapur during Maratha war of succession fought between Shahu & Tarabai. After the Peshwa of Pune obtained additional powers in 1749, Ghorpades concentrated their activities in Karnataka.

Murarrao Ghorpade, a grandnephew of Santaji, made an alliance with Muhammad Ali and helped him to defeat Chanda Sahib in famous Battle of Arcot fought in 1751. This battle is known in history of British East India Company as part of the Carnatic Wars fought between Robert Clive led forces of British East India Company and Dupleix led French East India Company between 1751 and 1758, also known as 7 years war. English historians tend to highlight & threat from Nizam of Hyderabad-Hyder Ali-Tipu Sultan kept them engrossed in Karnataka-Tamil Nadu away from politics of Pune Darbars. Ghorpades maintained working relationship with British East India Company in their Karnataka-Tamil Nadu operations maturing from the cordial relationship established with Robert Clive during siege of Arcot in 1751. Descendants of Santaji still live in (Sidhojirao Bahirjee branch) Sandur & Guti, Karnataka. His descendants are also part of the families of Mudhol, Bedag Thane, Madhabhavi Thane, Khemlapur Thane, of state Datwadd, Bahadurwadi, Satave, Bhadale, Ashta, Khanapur, Nandgao in Satara, Kolhapur and Sangli districts of Maharashtra. One branch of descendants of Rajeghorpade continued to serve under Kolhapur Princely State of Bhosale. Ramchandra Babaji Ghorpade of this branch held feudal estate near Satave of Panhala. Later after independence of India his grandson Nivruti Vithoji Ghorpade co-founded Warana Sugar and allied industries. He remained Vice-chairman/ Director of Warana industries for 35 years.

Jadunath Sarkar the noted historian writes in his famous book namely military history of India about Santaji:

He was a perfect master of this art, which can be more correctly described as Parthian warfare than as guerrilla tactics, because he could not only make night marches and surprises, but also cover long distances quickly and combine the movements of large bodieds over wide areas with an accuracy and punctuality which were incredible in any Asiatic army other than those of Chengiz Khan and Tamurlane. Santaji had an inborn genius of handling large bodies of troops spread through long distances changing his tactics so as to take prompt advantage of every change in enemy's plans and conditions, and organising combined movement without the risk of failure.

== In popular culture ==
=== Films and television ===
- He was portrayed by Vishal Phale in 2024 Indian Marathi-language film Dharmarakshak Mahaveer Chhatrapati Sambhaji Maharaj.
- He was portrayed by Ankit Anil Sharma in the 2025 Hindi film Chhaava.
