= Trimbak Rao Dabhade =

Marathi general (died 1731)

11th Senapati of the Maratha Empire
- Reign: 27 September 1729 – 28 April 1731
- Predecessor: Khanderao Dabhade
- Successor: Yashwant Rao Dabhade
- Died: 28 April 1731; Dabhoi, Maratha Empire (in present-day Gujarat, India)
- Father: Khanderao Dabhade

Trimbak Rao Dabhade (died 28 April 1731) was a Senapati of Maratha Empire during 1729–1731. He was the son of Khande Rao Dabhade and Umabai Dabhade.

The Dabhade clan had carried out several raids in the rich Mughal province of Gujarat, collecting chauth and sardeshmukhi taxes. After the death of his father Khande Rao in 1729, Trimbak Rao became the Senapati. When the Maratha Chhatrapati Shahu I's Peshwa (prime minister) Bajirao I tried to take over the tax collection in Gujarat, the Dabhades rebelled against this decision. Trimbak Rao was assisted by Nizam of Hyderabad and other Maratha clans that had traditionally controlled Gujarat (Gaekwad and Kadam Bande) and also Shahu's Pratinidhi and Samant. On 28 April 1731, after the grueling Battle of Dabhoi, he was killed by a musket shot fired by his maternal uncle Bhausingh Thoke. Even after killing him, Shahu and Bajirao avoided a rivalry with the powerful Dabhade clan: Trimbak's brother Yashwant Rao was made the new Senapati of Shahu. The Dabhade family was allowed to continue collecting chauth from Gujarat on the condition that they would deposit half the collections in the Satara treasury.
