= Khanderao Dabhade =

Maratha general and 10th Senapati

- Senapati

10th Senapati of the Maratha Empire
- Reign: 11 January 1717 – 27 September 1729
- Predecessor: Chandrasen Jadhav
- Successor: Trimbak Rao
- Born: c. 1665; Talegaon Dabhade, Maratha Kingdom (present-day Pune, Maharashtra, India)
- Died: 27 September 1729; Talegaon Dabhade, Maratha Empire (present-day Pune, Maharashtra, India)
- Spouse: Udabai; Parvatibai; Umabai
- Issue: Trimbak Rao; Yashwantrao; Sawai Baburao; Durgabai; Anandibai; Shahbai
- House: Dabhade
- Father: Yesaji
- Mother: Valahibai
- Religion: Hinduism

Khanderao Dabhade, also known as Khandoji Dabhade (c. 1665 – 27 September 1729) was a Maratha general who served as the Senapati (commander-in-chief) of the Maratha Empire under Chhatrapati Shahu I. He is known for his military achievements and is especially credited with leading the Maratha expansion in Gujarat by defeating the Mughals. In 1718, he led the Maratha forces dispatched to Delhi at the request of the Sayyid Brothers to depose Mughal Emperor Farrukhsiyar.

== Family Background and Early Life ==
The Dabhade family rose to prominence under Yesaji Dabhade, a Patil of Talegaon who served in the household establishment of Chhatrapati Shivaji. His sons, Khanderao (Khandoji) and Shivaji Dabhade, later accompanied Chhatrapati Rajaram during his retreat to Jinji in 1689. They played a vital role in securing the ruler's escape when the fortress was besieged by Mughal general Zulfiqar Khan in 1698. Following their return to Maharashtra in 1699, Rajaram recognized the family's service by granting them the command of a paga (state cavalry unit) and the dignity of Senakhaskhel.

Khanderao gained significant military experience fighting under Dhanaji Jadhav, distinguishing himself during the Maratha victories against Mughal forces in Gujarat at the Battle of Ratanpur and the action at the Baba Piarah ford in 1706. Following the Battle of Khed in 1707, he allied with Chhatrapati Shahu I on the advice of Dhanaji Jadhav, consolidating his position by establishing a series of fortified posts along the Burhanpur–Surat trade highway.

== Campaigns in Baglan and Elevation to Senapati ==
Between 1712 and 1716, Dabhade dominated the strategic Baglan region, systematically intercepting Mughal trade caravans and exacting Chauth. In 1712, his forces plundered a major imperial treasure caravan escorted by Muhammad Tebrezee, effectively rendering the highway impassable without tribute.

To clear the Burhanpur–Surat axis, the Mughal Viceroy of the Deccan, Sayyid Husain Ali Khan, dispatched an expeditionary force under his Bakhshi, Zulfiqar Beg. Dabhade executed a tactical retreat, drawing the Mughal vanguard into the rugged defiles of Baglan, where the Marathas launched a decisive ambush. Zulfiqar Beg and a large portion of his contingent were killed, and their entire baggage train was captured. A subsequent retaliatory force led by Muhkam Singh failed to dislodge Dabhade's garrisons.

In recognition of these decisive successes, Chhatrapati Shahu appointed Khanderao Dabhade as the Senapati (Commander-in-Chief) of the Maratha Empire on 11 January 1717, while his previous title of Senakhaskhel was transferred to his son, Trimbakrao Dabhade. Immediately following his elevation, Dabhade beat back the Sayyid's army to relieve the Maratha capital in December 1716, and later led an expedition into Mughal territory to plunder Ahmednagar in August 1717.

== The Delhi Expedition (1718–1719) ==
In June 1718, Dabhade arrived at Aurangabad with a force of 15,000 cavalry to fulfill the diplomatic terms negotiated between the Maratha court and Viceroy Sayyid Husain Ali Khan. He served as a principal commander alongside Peshwa Balaji Vishwanath during the subsequent Maratha march on Delhi. During the political crisis in February 1719 that resulted in the deposition of Emperor Farrukhsiyar, Dabhade coordinated a multi-pronged siege deployment securing key approaches to the capital, including the Lahore and Ajmeri gates. The success of this expedition directly resulted in the ratification of the three imperial Sanads granting Swarajya, Chauth, and Sardeshmukhi rights to Chhatrapati Shahu. His contingent further distinguished itself in August 1720 at the Battle of Balapur, fighting against the Nizam as allies of the Sayyid brothers.

== Expansion into Gujarat and Later Years ==
Baglan and Gujarat were recognized as the dedicated sphere of operations for the Dabhade family within the territorial demarcation of the Maratha Empire. Dabhade's lieutenant, Pilaji Gaikwad, established a base at Songarh using Kolis and Bhils as auxiliaries, successfully expanding Maratha fiscal collection over Gujarat. The family chronicle notes that Malwa was allocated to the Peshwa while Gujarat was assigned exclusively to the Senapati.

In his later years, advanced age and chronic kidney ailments impaired Dabhade's ability to campaign actively in the field. While he was nominally present during the Karnataka expedition (1726–1727) and the Battle of Palkhed (1728), operational leadership had largely transitioned away from him. Chhatrapati Shahu spent much of 1727 attempting to mediate the escalating revenue dispute between the Dabhade family and Peshwa Bajirao regarding Gujarat collection rights, though a permanent settlement eluded the court.

== Death and Legacy ==
Khanderao Dabhade died on 27 September 1729 at Talegaon Dabhade. Following his demise, his son Trimbakrao Dabhade was formally invested as the Senapati on 8 January 1730. The unresolved fiscal friction between the Peshwa and the Dabhades culminated in the Battle of Dabhoi on 1 April 1731, where Trimbakrao was killed. Although the Dabhade administrative presence in Gujarat eventually declined, the family's legacy persisted through their line of soldiers and their commanders, the Gaikwads, who later assumed control of the region under the title of Senakhaskhel.
