= Chauth =

Regulated tax imposed by the Maratha Empire in the Indian subcontinent

Chauth (from Sanskrit: चतुर्थ, romanized: caturtha, lit. 'one fourth') was a regular tax or tribute imposed from the early 18th century by the Maratha Empire in the Indian subcontinent. It was an annual tax nominally levied at 25% on revenue or produce, hence the name, on lands that were under nominal Mughal rule. The sardeshmukhi was an additional 10% levy on top of the chauth. A tribute paid to the king, it was started by Koli Maharaja Som Shah of Ramnagar.

Opinions on the function of the chauth vary. According to M G Ranade, the chauth was charged to provide armed security for a state by the Marathas and is thus comparable to the system of subsidiary alliances that was used by Lord Wellesley to bring Indian states under British control.

The historian Jadunath Sarkar has argued that the chauth was essentially a tax paid by those states that did not want the Marathas to enter into their realm. The chauth thus served as protection money against Maratha invasions of the chauth paying state. The tax was levied at the rate of one fourth the annual revenues of the state and was levied at the cost of the revenue paid by the state to the Mughals or the Deccan kingdoms.

In 1719, the Mughal emperor Rafi ud-Darajat granted Chhatrapati Shahu Raje Bhonsale the chauth and sardeshmukhi rights over the six Deccan provinces in exchange for his maintaining a contingent of 15,000 troops for the emperor. The revenues from chauth were in turn divided into four parts that went to various functionaries of the Maratha empire.

One fourth of the levy, called babti, went to the Chhatrapati and he also had discretionary grant making authority over the nadgaunda, proceeds which amounted to 3% of the total collection. Also, 6% of the chauth collections was granted to the pant sachiv, the officer in charge of the royal secretariat and was called the sahotra grant. Two thirds of the collections, however, remained with the Maratha sardars, who collected the taxes and used them for maintaining their troops for the chhatrapati. That part of the levy was called mokasa. The chauth, along with sardeshmukhi levies, ensured a steady and large stream of income for the Marathas and helped them expand their beyond the swarajya territories of Shivaji.

== See also ==
- Sack of Surat
- Mahratta Sackings of Goa and Bombay-Bassein
- Mahratta Invasions of Bengal
- Rakhi system
