= Gujrat =

Gujrati may refer to:

== India ==
- Gujarat, a state in western India
- Gujarat Subah, a former Mughal imperial province
- Gujarat Sultanate, a historical sultanate
- Gujarat Titans, a T20 cricket team in the Indian Premier League (IPL); based in Ahmedabad, Gujarat, India
- Gujarat Lions, a defunct IPL T20 cricket team based in Rajkot, Gujarat, India (2016–17)

== Pakistan ==
- Gujrat, Mianwali, a town in Punjab
- Gujrat, Pakistan, a city in Punjab
  - Gujrat Division, an administrative division in Punjab
  - Gujrat District, an administrative district in Punjab
  - Gujrat Tehsil, an administrative division in Punjab
  - Gujrat-I, Gujrat-II, Gujrat-III, and Gujrat-IV, parliamentary constituencies
  - Qasba Gujrat, a town in Punjab

== See also ==
- "Jai Jai Garavi Gujarat", state song of Gujarat, India
- Gujratan, a village in Punjab, India
- Gujarat Giants (disambiguation)
- Gujarat Lion (disambiguation)
- Gujarat riots (disambiguation)
- Gujarati (disambiguation), a language spoken in Gujarat, India
- Guzerat (disambiguation)
- Gurjara (disambiguation)
