= Gujar =

Gujar may refer to:

- Gurjar, Gujjar or Gujar, an ethnic group mainly in Afghanistan, India and Pakistan
- Gujari language, a language spoken by the Gujjar people of Afghanistan, Pakistan and India
- Prataprao Gujar commander in chief of Maratha Empire
- Gujar, Nepal, a town in Nepal
- Gujar Khan, nephew of Ataga Khan who fought against Akbar's army at the Battle of Tukaroi
- Gujar Kurashvili (born 1951), Georgian general

== See also ==
- Gurjara (disambiguation)
- Gujrat (disambiguation)
- Gujranwala (disambiguation)
- Gowjar (disambiguation)
- Gujar Khan, a city in Pakistan
- Gujjari, a rāga of Odissi music
- Gujari language, an Indo-Aryan language of Rajasthan, India
- Gujari Mahal Archaeological Museum, Gwalior, India
