= Virji Vora =

Rich merchant of Mughal Empire

- Born: c. 1590
- Died: c. 1670s Surat, Gujarat Subah, Mughal Empire (modern-day Gujarat, India)
- Occupations: Wholesale trading and money-lending
- Years active: 1619-1670
- Known for: credit supplier and customer of the British East India Company and the Dutch East India Company

Virji Vora (Note: Alternative Roman script transcriptions of his name found in various historical records include: "Virgee Vora," "Virjee Vorah," "Vorge Vora," "Baharji Bohra," and "Baharji Bohrah." A 1655 letter from him to the Company is signed in Gujarati as "Virji Vohora Kendua.") (c. 1590–c. 1670s) was an Indian merchant from Surat during the Mughal era. The East India Company Factory Records describe him as the richest merchant in the world at the time. According to English records, his personal worth is estimated to be worth 8 million rupees, a substantial amount of money at the time. He has been variously described as a "merchant prince," and a "plutocrat."

The business activities of Virji Vora included wholesale trading, money lending, and banking. He established a monopoly over certain imports in Surat, and dealt with a wide range of commodities including spices, bullion, coral, ivory, lead, and opium. He was a major credit supplier and customer of the British East India Company and the Dutch East India Company.

== Early life ==
The records of the East India Company frequently mention the business activities of Virji Vora, but little is known about his origins or family background. He has been variously described as a Hindu, Jain or a Muslim. In 1968, Prof. K. H. Kamdar wrote a paper on him based on material from the Bombay Archives and Jain documents in Surat and Baroda. According to this research, Virji was a Sthanakvasi Jain of the Lonkagacchiya group. He may have been a member of the Srimali Oswal Porwal caste group. He was deeply involved in religious affairs, and held the title of Samghapati/Sanghavi, which is given to a lay leader who makes a major contribution, such as building a temple or organizing a mass pilgrimage. John F. Richards, writing in 1996, mentions him as "Baharji Bohra," and describes him as a Muslim Ismaili merchant belonging to the Bohra community.

The earliest mention of Virji appears in an East India Company record dated 22 March 1619, which recommends that his servant, "Hacka Parrache" (probably Hak Parekh) should be given "courteous usage" of all English ships at the Swally (Suvali) harbour of Surat. This meant that Virji's agent was given a permit authorizing him to visit English ships for making commercial transactions, indicating that he was already a well-established merchant by 1619.

== Business ==
=== Expanse ===
The business house of Virji Vora had branches at several places in India, as well as the port cities of the Persian Gulf, the Red Sea, and South-East Asia. Virji had agents at most important commercial centers of India, including

- Agra, the imperial capital and the center of the indigo trade;
- Burhanpur, the major transportation and textile center on the Agra-Surat route;
- Golconda in Deccan, where his agents bought spices (especially pepper and cardamom);
- Goa, where his agents bought spices used by the Malabar frigates for coastal trade;
- Calicut in Malabar, center of trade for assorted spices;
- Bihar;

Within Gujarat, his agents were spread across various towns including Ahmedabad, Vadodara, and Bharuch.

=== Business activities ===
A wholesale trader, Virji Vora dealt in a wide range of commodities. Some of his deals mentioned in historical records include

1625
Virji bought the entire pepper stock brought by the Dutch to Surat. The English factory at Surat decided to purchase pepper worth £10,000 from Virji at the rate of 16 mahmudis per maund. (Note: Mahmudi was a contemporary currency unit (1 rupee was equal to 2 3/4 mahmudis in 1625). Maund is a traditional unit of mass, equivalent to around 33 lbs in this context.) Virji, who owned the entire pepper stock in the city, demanded 16.25 per maund, and also asked them to sell to him 25 chests of coral at a price lower than the market price. When the merchants from South India arrived at Surat with a fresh stock of pepper, Virji bought all the pepper from them. The English then sent an agent to the Deccan to buy pepper, but Virji asked his agents to buy the pepper stock at a price slightly higher than the English were prepared to give. Ultimately, the English were forced to purchase pepper from Virji.

1629
Bought coral from the English at a discount after they found it difficult to sell.

1629
Sold 20,000 mahmudis worth of pepper to the English.

1633
Traded 12,000 tolas of gold with the English.

1641
Sold turmeric and cardamoms to the English.

1648
Bought cloves from the Dutch at a cheaper rate than the English thanks to his enormous liquid capital. He purchased the cloves at Rs. 45 per maund and sold them at Rs. 62-65 per maund.

1649
Bought all the available quantities of mace and nutmeg in Surat.

1650
Bought 20 maunds of tea from the Dutch.

1650
Bought silver ingots from the English at the previous year's rates after the local shroffs (buillion traders) of Surat refused to take them.

1650
Bought all the goods brought by the Dutch to Surat in alliance with the Mohandas Parekh (the broker for the Dutch).

1651
Bought ivory from the English and coral from the Dutch.

1668
Virji Vora and Haji Zahid (another merchant of Surat) stored thousands of maunds of vermilion and quicksilver, "sufficient to supply the whole country for many years."

Virji Vora also bought opium and cotton from the local merchants and exchanged them for pepper in South India or in the Spice islands.

He would often purchase the entire quantity of a particular commodity and then dictate terms to the other merchants, including Indians and foreigners. According to W. H. Moreland, the syndicates dominated by Virji bought the entire cargoes valued from 5 to 10 lakh of rupees. An English factory record dated 18 July 1643 mentions him as "the sole monopolist of all European commodities." It further states that the deals between the Europeans and the smaller local merchants were restrained by him, and the "time and price" of the deals were decided at "his will and at his own disposure."

== Relations with the Europeans ==
Virji Vora competed with the British East India Company (EIC) at times, but he was also their biggest creditor and customer in Surat. The two often sent gifts and letters to each other.

- 1635: Virji gave nine pieces of white cloth to the Company.
- 1643: The EIC gave a German Iron Chest (manufactured at Nuremberg) to Virji.
- 1654: Virji asked the Company directors to arbitrate on his disputes with their employees in India. The decision was not favorable to Vora, but the Company gave him several pieces of broad cloth and satin, two large looking-glasses, and a piece of double glided plate engraved with the Company's Coat of Arms.
- 1661: Virji gave the company calicoes.

The English often complained about the high interest rates charged by Virji Vora (1-1.5% per month). One English record states that, "the town [Surat] is very empty of moneys; Virji Vora is the only master of it" and, "none but Virgee Vorah hath moneye [sic] to lend or will lend." Some of his credits to the English include

- 1619: A record dated 25 August 1619, which states that Virji lent 25,000 mahmudis to the English.
- 1630: Lent Rs. 50,000 to the English at Agra.
- 1635: Lent Rs. 20,000 to the English.
- 1636: Lent Rs. 30,000 to the English.
- 1636: Lent Rs. 2 lakhs to the English.
- 1642: A letter dated 27 January 1642 mentions him as the "greatest creditor" of the East India Company, and mentions that he offered a loan of Rs. 100,000 in "necessitous and calamitous times."
- 1647: Financed the East India Company's voyage to Pegu, Burma by providing 10,000 pagodas (about 6000 £), at an interest of 1.17% per month, in Golconda.
- 1650: Offered Rs. 100,000 to Merry, the President at English Factory at Surat.
- 1669: The English borrowed Rs. 400,000 from a group of creditors, of which Virji was an important member.

Most of the capital lent to the Dutch East India Company (VOC) in India also came from Virji Vora and his close associate, Shantidas Jhaveri. Virji also lent money to individual Englishmen to finance their own private trade - a practice denounced by the Company's London office.

The Dutch and the English often used his facilities for transmitting large amounts of money from Surat to Agra through hundis (similar to demand drafts or traveler's cheques).

== Relations with the Mughal Authorities ==
Virji Vora's relationships with the Mughal Subahdars (Governors) of Surat were mostly cordial. By 1623, Virji had become influential with Ishaq Beg, the Mughal Subahdar of Surat. He was an important figure in the civic affairs of Surat, and was part of the committees formed to discuss important public issues. In July 1624, he was a member of the committee formed to grant certain trading and religious rights to the English. Other members of the committee included Saif Khan (Subahdar of Surat), Thomas Rastell (President of English factory), Jam Quli Beg (Commander of the Surat castle), Mahmud Kasim (Chief Qazi), and Hari Vaishya. In 1636, he was on a committee set by the Subahdar to settle the claims of the merchants who had lost their goods to English pirates.

Mir Musa (also known by his title Muiz-Ul-Mulk), the Subahdar of Surat in the 1630s, himself traded with the English. In order to maintain good relations with him, Virji did not deal with the English in the commodities in which Mir Musa traded. Later in 1642, Mir Musa helped Virji corner to coral stock. Virji later used his friendship with Mir Musa to monopolize coral, pepper, and other commodities in 1643.

Hakim Sadra (Masih-Uz-Zaman), who briefly replaced Mir Musa as the Subahdar in 1635, seized all available supplies of pepper in Surat in 1638. He extorted money from the mercantile communities of Surat, and consequently ran into a conflict with Virji Vora. In the early months of 1638, he put Virji in a jail at Surat. He charged Virji with as many as 50 offences, and sent a list of these offences to the Mughal Emperor, Shah Jahan. Virji denied all the charges, and was summoned by the emperor. The emperor set him free and removed Hakim from office.

He is noted as sending the Mughal emperor Shah Jahan four Arab horses, and prince Murad Bakhsh as presenting the emperor with 18 of the famous Gujarat bullocks in c. 1657.

== Last days ==
Virji Vora suffered a major setback when the Maratha chief Shivaji raided Surat in 1664. On 7 January 1664, Maratha soldiers demolished his residence and warehouses, and looted a large amount of money, along with pearls, rubies, emeralds, and diamonds. Volquard Iverson, a Dutch eye-witness, states that Shivaji got, "six barrels of gold, money, pearls, gems and other precious wares" from Virji. The French traveler Jean de Thévenot, who visited Surat in the 1660s and developed a friendship with Virji, also wrote about the huge monetary loss suffered by him during the Shivaji's raid. William Foster estimates this loot to be worth £50,000.

Even after the Maratha raid, Virji was not completely ruined, as his assets were distributed across a number of centers outside Surat. The Subahdar of Surat sent Virji and Haji Zahid Beg to the Mughal Court at Agra to convince the authorities to fortify the town. An English letter dated 27 November 1664 states: "Haji Zahid Beg and Virji Vora, the two greatest merchants of this town, hold up their heads still and are for great bargains; so that it seems Shivaji hath not carried away all, but left them a competency to carry on their trade."

The last references to Virji occur in the English records of 1670, which talk about an Armenian merchant called Khwaja Minaz buying broad cloth on behalf of Virji Vora, and Virji's grandson Nanchand purchasing tin and copper. Virji had grown old by 1670, and suffered another setback during Shivaji's second raid of Surat in 1670. The English and Dutch records of Surat's merchants and brokers do not mention him after 1670.

François Martin, who served as the head of the French operations in Surat during 1681-1686, wrote about a set of banker-cum-merchants whom he always referred to as "the brothers Boras." Lotika Varadarajan, writing in 1976, said: "In sifting through the material it appears more than probable that one of the two brothers was Virji Vora". However, Makrand Mehta (1991) believes that the English records would have certainly mentioned Virji if he had lived beyond 1670. He therefore speculates that Virji likely died in 1670. B. G. Gokhale assumes that Virji might have retired from the business after his grandson Nanchand took over the business, and might have died in 1675. Paul Dundas also believes that Virji died in 1675.

== See also ==
- Shantidas Jhaveri
- Banarsidas
- Kasi Viranna
- Beri Thimanna
