= Sack of Surat =

1664 battle in India

Coordinates: 21°10′N 72°50′E

Battle of Surat
- Part of Maratha campaigns in Gujarat
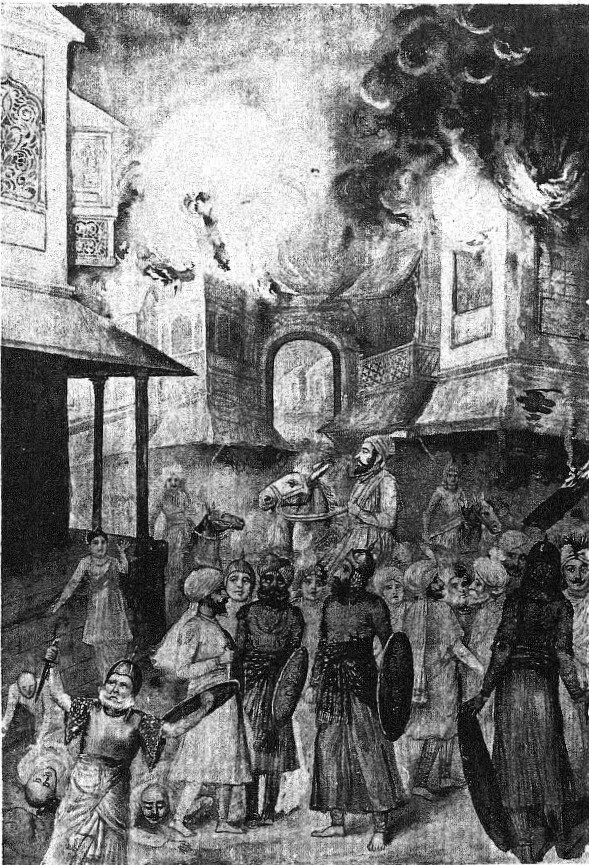
- Early 20th century depiction of the Sack of Surat by Shivaji.
Date	5–13 January 1664
Location	Surat, Gujarat Subah, Mughal Empire (Now Gujarat, India)
Result	Maratha victory: The Maratha sacks the city for five or six days

Belligerents
Maratha Kingdom	Mughal Empire

Commanders and leaders
Shivaji (WIA)	Inayat Khan

Strength
4,000 cavalry	5,000 garrisons

Casualties and losses
- Shivaji ordered the beheading of four Imperialist prisoners and the amputation of the hands of twenty-four others.

The Battle of Surat, also known as the Sack of Surat, was a land battle that took place on 5 January 1664 and ended on 13 January 1664 , near the city of Surat, in present-day Gujarat, India, between Shivaji, leader of the fledgling Maratha State and Inayat Khan, a Mughal commander. The Marathas defeated the Mughal military unit posted at Surat.

Surat was a wealthy port city used by the Mughals for maritime trade in the Arabian Sea. The city was populated mostly by Hindus, but there were Muslims and others as well, including the officials of the Mughal administration at the city. According to historian James Grant Duff, Surat was attacked by Shivaji on 5 January 1664; the attack was so sudden that the population had no chance to flee, the violent plunder of the Maratha forces continued for six days and two-thirds of the city was burnt down. The loot was then transferred to Rajgad hidden in the Western Ghats near Poona.

== Background ==
Shaista Khan, the Mughal nawab, was in the Deccan for more than three years fighting the Marathas, and their financial condition was dire. So to improve his finances, Shivaji planned to attack Surat, a key Mughal administrative center and a wealthy port town that generated a million rupees in taxes. His aim was to capture and loot the wealthy port city and bring all the loot to his Raigad Fort. In the rainy season of 1663, he focused on targeting Surat, Shivaji's spies and agents meticulously observed the northern Mughal territories between Pune and Burhanpur, seeking out the weakest point for a new assault as open war between them had commenced. With accurate intelligence in hand, Shivaji planned to strike Surat, intending to tarnish the Emperor's reputation by raising a significant disturbance. While Surat had a castle on the river Tapti, the city as a whole had poor defenses.

== Battle ==
=== Movement and clash of forces ===
Despite the distance of over two hundred miles and the lack of good roads, Shivaji was undeterred. He strategically positioned military camps in the vicinity of Danda Rajpuri, Pen, and Nashik, with troops totaling about four thousand. Under the guise of suppressing the Siddi and the Portuguese, these troops mobilized from their stations towards Surat in early January 1664. Shivaji himself departed from Nashik and led his forces through a circuitous route, uniting all detachments near Gandevi, about 28 miles south of Surat.

The news of Shivaji's approach struck Surat with fear and anxiety, prompting many to flee the town. Surat's Governor, Inayat Khan, failed to take adequate measures to protect the town, leaving it vulnerable to Shivaji's impending arrival. Shivaji, through special agents, conveyed his intention to the Governor and local merchants, emphasizing his need for funds due to his conflict with the Emperor. He demanded a substantial amount from Surat's wealthy merchants, warning of dire consequences for refusal. However, Inayat Khan, his nobles, and elite citizens fled to the Surat castle and ordinary townsfolk fled the city. George Oxenden, the president of the English factory at Surat, decided to defend his position and fortified the factory with artillery to protect goods worth £80,000 that the East India Company owned.

Upon Shivaji's arrival outside Surat, he sent a message to the governor Inayat Khan to come to the Maratha camp and bring with him the three most prominent merchants of the city: Haji Zahid Beg, Virji Vora, and Haji Qasim. If the governor failed to present himself and the merchants, Shivaji threatened to burn Surat, which commenced on the former's noncompliance.After two days of nervous deliberation, the Mughal Governor Inayat Khan sent a young officer to assassinate Shivaji. Pretending to negotiate the surrender of the fort, the officer entered Shivaji's tent for a meeting. Shivaji, recalling past taunts, playfully mocked the Governor's cowardice. Angered by Shivaji's banter, the officer attacked with a dagger, but a Maratha guardsman intervened, severing the officer's hand. Despite the skirmish, a rumor spread that Shivaji had been killed, prompting calls for revenge in the Maratha camp. To quell the uproar, Shivaji ordered the execution of four Mughal prisoners by beheading and the amputation of the hands of twenty-four others. Shivaji ordered a general sack of the town instead of massacre, leading to widespread plunder and devastation over the next few days.

Surat was under attack for nearly three days, during this time the Maratha Army looted all the wealth from the traders of the Mughal Gujarat Subah and others such as the Portuguese trading centers. The Maratha soldiers took away cash, gold, silver, pearls, rubies, diamonds & emeralds from the houses of rich merchants such as Virji Vora, Haji Zahid Beg, Haji Kasim and others. The business of Mohandas Parekh, the deceased broker of the Dutch East India Company, was spared as he was reputed as a charitable man. Similarly, Shivaji did not plunder the houses of the foreign missionaries. Shivaji and the Marathas resorted to torture and mutilation to extract ransoms and confessions from their prisoners. Those who did not produce adequate tributes had one or sometimes two hands chopped off.

On the first day of the sack, an Englishman of the factory named Anthony Smith was travelling alone from Surwali to Surat, where he was captured by Maratha forces and taken to Shivaji. He was initially threatened with death, and then made prisoner. Shivaji demanded ransom for his release, and eventually let the Englishman go for 300 rupees. However the English factors refused to readmit him, and sent him back to Shivaji as his servant. Shivaji sent messages to the English factory that they should escape ruin by paying him tribute with their goods, but his requests were denied. The English factory and the house of Haji Zaid Beg (whose house was plundered on the first day of the sack) were divided by a single wall. The Marathas sought to burn the ward where the English factory was located to induce them to surrender, but in a small skirmish led by Gerald Aungier the Marathas were driven back, and Shivaji decided to not further molest the English. The Dutch factory was nearly burnt down in the general burning of the city but was spared by chance.

== Aftermath ==
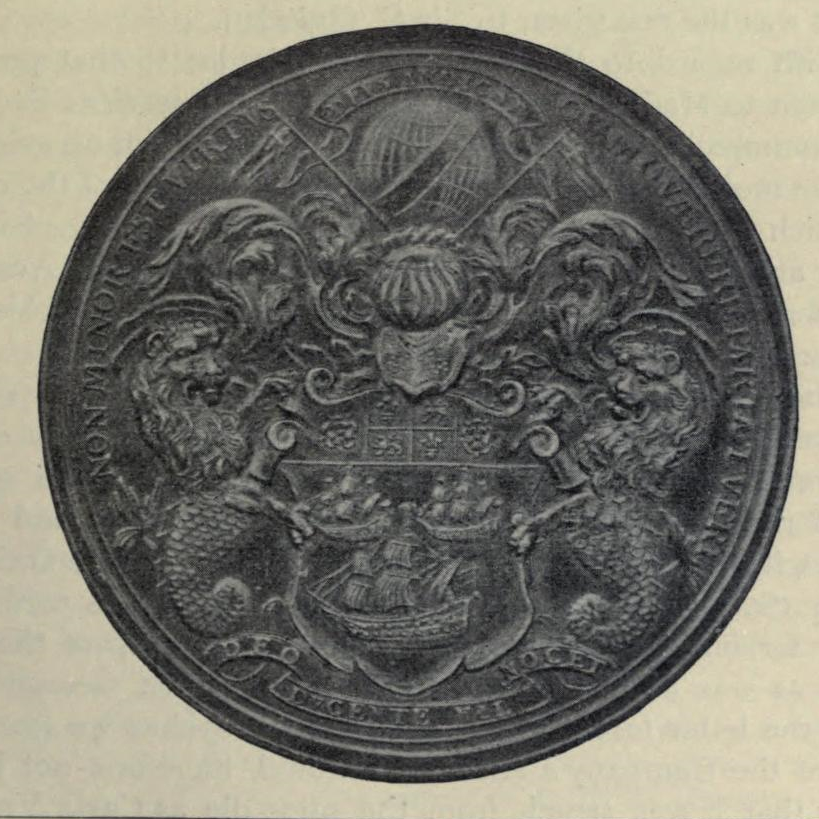
Defense of Surat Factory Medal presented to George Oxenden, 1668.

The Marathas ransacked houses and chests, accumulating a vast amount of loot, primarily gold, silver, pearls, and diamonds. Shivaji swiftly departed Surat upon learning of an approaching Mughal force, leaving behind heaps of clothing and household articles for the town's residents. The value of the plunder carried away was estimated to be substantial, possibly exceeding a crore of rupees. The plunder was utilized to fortify Raigad, Shivaji's capital, and construct the formidable water fortress of Sindhudurg at Malwan. Subsequently, Mughal forces arrived at Surat, only to find the town defaced and looted by Shivaji's forces.

The viceroy of Gujarat, Mahabat Khan marched with an army to face Shivaji at Surat, but once Shivaji learnt of the army's movement his forces left the city, and Mahabat Khan turned back at Bharuch. The English factory was praised by the local townsfolk, Mahabat Khan's officers, and the Mughal emperor for their defense of their local ward. When Inayat Khan eventually emerged from Surat Castle, he was derided by an angry mob of citizens who hurled dirt at him. Inayat Khan's son decided to take revenge and shot a Baniya boy with an arrow.

In recognition of the losses faced by the Surat merchants, Aurangzeb waived the custom duty on imports and exports for a year for native and foreign merchants of the city. The English and Dutch in particular were granted a reduction in their custom duty from 2.5% to 2%. This reduction for the European merchants would be later taken away by Aurangzeb fifteen years later. Oxenden and his subordinates were given sizable bonuses by the East India Company for their defense of the factory.

Shivaji would continue to threaten the town with plunder unless Aurangzeb granted him chauth, or 40% of the annual revenues, of Surat district. This eventually led to the second Sack of Surat in 1670.

== See also ==
- Battle of Sinhagad
- Battle of Purandar
- Sacking of Burhanpur (1681)

== Sources ==
- Sardesai, Govind Sakharam (1946). New History Of The Marathas Vol.1. Karnatak Printing Press, Phoenix Publications. pp. 151–155.
- Mehendale, Gajanan Bhaskar (2011). Shivaji His Life and Times. pp. 500–512.
- Kincaid, Dennis (1937). The Grand Rebel: An Impression of Shivaji, founder of the Maratha Empire. London: Collins. p. 171.
- Commissariat, M.S. (1980). History of Gujarat. Vol. III, The Maratha Period: 1785 A.D. to 1818 A.D. Ahmedabad: Gujarat Vidya Sabha.
