= Qazi Abdul Wahhab =

17th-century chief justice of the Mughal Empire

- Painting depicting Qazi Abdul Wahhab from a work of Niccolao Manucci, c. 1678–1686, Bibliothèque nationale de France

Qazi-ul-quzzat of the Mughal Empire
- In office 1659–1675
- Monarch: Aurangzeb
- Succeeded by: Shaikh al-Islam

Personal details
- Born: Patan, Gujarat Subah
- Died: 1675 Delhi
- Relations: Muhammad Tahir Patani (grandfather); Abu Sa'id (son-in-law)
- Children: Shaikh al-Islam; Abdul Haq; Nur ul-Haq; Muhiuddin

Qazi Abdul Wahhab (died 1675), also written Abd al-Wahhab, was a Sunni Bohra qazi (judge) active in the 17th-century Mughal Empire, during the reigns of Mughal emperors Shah Jahan and Aurangzeb. He rose to prominence during the reign of the latter, serving as the qazi-ul-quzzat (chief justice) of the empire for sixteen years. He engaged in commercial activities in the Mughal province of Gujarat.

== Origins ==
Abdul Wahhab hailed from a landed family of Sunni Bohra Muslims based in Patan, a city in the northern part of Mughal Gujarat. His grandfather was Muhammad Tahir Patani (died 1578) an Islamic jurist active in the same city who lived through emperor Akbar's invasion of Gujarat in 1572. He led the Sunni orthodox faction of the Islamic clergy in northern Gujarat and actively campaigned against members of the Mahdavi movement as well as Shias in order to enforce Sunni orthodoxy. He was an opponent of Akbar, who indulged the beliefs of Tahir's rivals. Abdul Wahhab authored a eulogistic biography of his grandfather titled Risala-i Manaqib.

== Career ==
During the reign of Mughal emperor Shah Jahan, Abdul Wahhab served as the qazi of Patan. He met Aurangzeb as a prince when the latter was a regional governor, though the date and circumstances are unclear. When Aurangzeb was in the Deccan, Abdul Wahhab joined his service as mufti (legal expert) of his princely army. According to the chronicle Mirat-i-Ahmadi, when Aurangzeb was victorious in the war of succession and organized his second coronation at the Red Fort, he approached the chief qazi of the empire to have his name recited in the khutba (Friday sermon), a Mughal tradition symbolizing sovereignty. The qazi refused on the grounds that Aurangzeb's father was still alive, having been imprisoned in the Agra Fort, and so Aurangzeb did not have a legitimate claim to the throne. Abdul Wahhab refuted these claims by arguing that Shah Jahan was no longer fit to rule, having lost control of his empire, and cited various theological arguments. Aurangzeb gave him permission to read the khutba in his name. Following the coronation, Abdul Wahhab was awarded the post of qazi al-quzzat (chief justice) of the empire.

As chief qazi, Abdul Wahhab was a close advisor to the emperor. He had a reputation for enforcing the emperor's Islamic orthodoxy and opposing ideas he and the emperor considered heretic, such as Shi'ism and millenarianism. He officiated the marriages of different Mughal princes such as Muhammad Mu'azzam. Contemporary chronicles record that Abdul Wahhab enjoyed great influence on economic and political matters but little record exists of what his actions or functions were during his tenure. A noble of Aurangzeb's reign, Mahabat Khan Lahrasp, was an outspoken critic of the increased power of the qadi and theologians in the era and held a grudge against Abdul Wahhab, confiscating his commercial goods on one occasion.

Abdul Wahhab had commercial interests in Gujarat, having founded a neighborhood in Ahmedabad named Wahhabganj to sell imported aromatics from Surat. In 1665, Aurangzeb had customs duty in the empire fixed at 2.5 percent, and 5 percent for non-Muslims; in 1667 Muslims became exempt from customs duty. Some scholars have suggested that Abdul Wahhab's business interests in Gujarat may have contributed to these decisions.

Abdul Wahhab had a reputation for being a corrupt official according to anecdotes from contemporary chronicles, allegedly taking large bribes and charging commissions. The chronicle Maasir al-Umara relates that he left a large inheritance to his sons of one lakh of ashrafis, five lakhs of rupees, and jewels. However, this fortune may also have come from his commercial enterprise. Niccolao Manucci in Storia do Mogor wrote that Abdul Wahhab secretly drank alcohol supplied by the former without the emperor's knowledge.

Abdul Wahhab fell ill in 1675 around Lahore. He subsequently travelled to Delhi and died there on 18 Ramadan 1086 AH (late 1675), (Note: Bilgrami and Saran agree on the Hijri date of his death, which falls in the Gregorian year 1675, but disagree on the specific Gregorian date. Saran provides 26th November, while Bilgrami provides 20 December.) having served as chief qazi for sixteen years.

== Family ==
Abdul Wahhab's family enjoyed privileged offices during Aurangzeb's reign. He had four sons; Shaikh al-Islam, Abdul Haq, Nur ul-Haq, and Muhiuddin. The eldest, Shaikh al-Islam, was appointed chief qazi after Abdul Wahhab's passing. He left the post in 1683 when he refused to sanction Aurangzeb's conquests of the Bijapur and Golconda Sultanates, but still held favour with the emperor. Abdul Wahhab's son-in-law Abu Sa'id was made chief qazi after Shaikh al-Islam, serving until his resignation in 1685. Abdul Wahhab's other sons all held varying judicial roles in Gujarat.
