= Gujarati =

Gujarati may refer to:

- something of, from, or related to Gujarat, a state of India
- Gujarati people, the major ethnic group of Gujarat
- Gujarati language, the Indo-Aryan language spoken by them
- Gujarati languages, the Western Indo-Aryan sub-family which includes Gujarati
- Gujarati script
  - Gujarati (Unicode block), a block of Gujarati characters in Unicode
- Gujarati, a style of sari draping
- Gujarati (magazine), a magazine published from 1880 to 1929
- Vidit Gujrathi (born 1994), Indian chess grandmaster

== See also ==
- Gujarati cuisine
- Gujarati culture
- Gujari language, an Indo-Aryan language
- Gujrat (disambiguation)
