= Gurjara =

Gurjara may refer to:

- Gurjars or Gujjars, an ethnic group of India, Pakistan and Afghanistan
- Gurjar Kshatriya Kadias, or Gurjar Kadias, a Hindu community of Gujarat, India
- Kutch Gurjar Kshatriya, another Hindu community of Gujarat, India
- Gurjaradesa, a historical region of India in Rajasthan and Gujarat
  - Gurjaras of Lata (500–738 CE), a dynasty of Bharuch, Gujarat, India
  - Gurjara-Pratihara dynasty (800–1150 CE), or Pratiharas of Kannauj, a north Indian dynasty based in Kannauj
    - Maru-Gurjara architecture, a style of north Indian temple architecture
  - Gurjara Apabhramsa, an Apabhramsa (Middle Indo-Aryan) language of western India

== See also ==
- Gujar (disambiguation)
- Gujrat (disambiguation)
- Gurjar Veer, 1932 Indian silent film
- Gujari language, a Rajasthani (Western Indo-Aryan) language spoken by the Gurjars in India, Pakistan and Afghanistan
- Gurjari (raga), raga in Indian classical music
