= Mahabat Khan Mosque =

Mughal-era mosque in Peshawar, Khyber Pakhtunkhwa, Pakistan

- مہابت خان مسجد
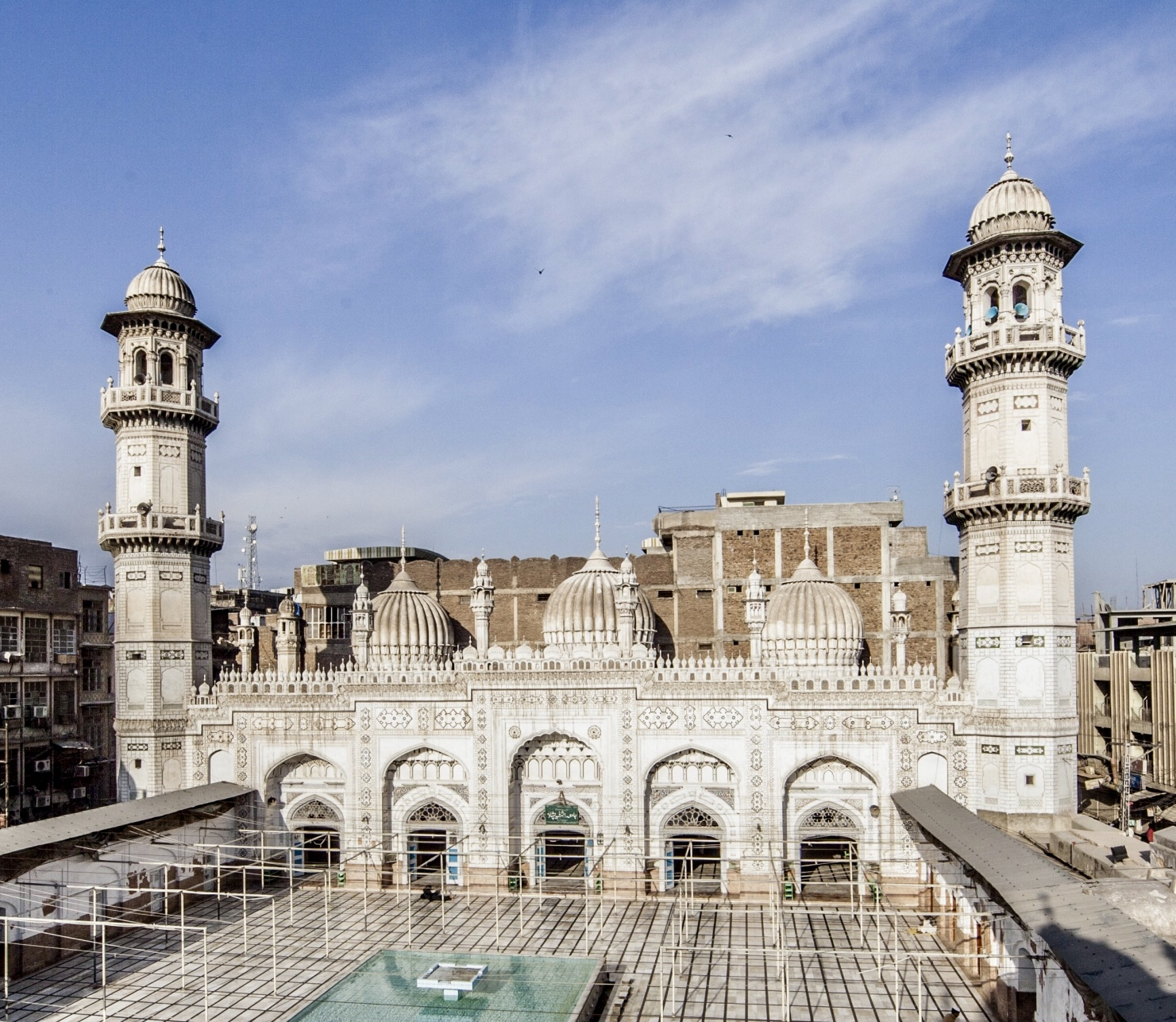
- The white marble façade of the mosque is one of the most iconic sights in Peshawar

Religion
- Affiliation: Islam
- Leadership: Muhammad Tayyab Qureshi (Khateeb)

Location
- Location: Peshawar, Pakistan
- Interactive map of Mahabat Khan Mosque
- Coordinates: 34.01065°N 71.57318°E

Architecture
- Type: Mosque
- Founder: Mahabat Khan II
- Completed: 1670
- Minarets: 2 functional, 8 decorative

The Mahabat Khan Mosque (Hindko and Urdu: مہابت خان مسجد; Pashto: مهابت خان جومات), sometimes spelt Mohabbat Khan Mosque, is a 17th-century Mughal-era mosque in Peshawar, Khyber Pakhtunkhwa, Pakistan. The mosque was built in 1630, and named after a Mughal governor of Peshawar, Mahabat Khān. The mosque's white marble façade is considered to be one of Peshawar's most iconic sights.

== History ==
The mosque was built between 1660 and 1670 by the Mughals, on what was the highest point in the old city. While the construction of this mosque is not mentioned in any Mughal records, verbal traditions associate the construction of the mosque with a Mughal governor named Mahabat Khan; some scholars have identified this figure as Mahabat Khan Luhrasp, a prominent noble of Shah Jahan and Aurangzeb's reign, based on his extended tenure governing the province.

The minarets of the Mohabbat Khan Mosque were frequently used in Sikh times for hanging prisoners. Five people per day were hanged from the minarets because they banned 5 times Azan for prayer, as a substitute for the gallows. Following the Soviet invasion of Afghanistan, refugee tribal elders would congregate in the mosque in order to forge unity amongst Afghans against the Soviets.

== Layout ==
The mosque is 30,155 square feet in size. Its open courtyard has a centrally located ablution pool and a single row of rooms lining the exterior walls.

== Architecture ==
The prayer hall occupies the west side. The hall is flanked by two tall minarets, which are divided into three sections. The façade of the prayer hall is also capped by 6 smaller decorative minarets that flank the mosque's 5 arched entryways, with an additional 2 minarets flanking the set of 6. The prayer hall is capped by 3 fluted domes. The roofline rises from the outer edges, towards the centre by a series of four small incremental height increases. The roofline is embellished with numerous merlons. The top of the mosque's white marble façade is capped by cavettos, or concave moulding.

5 arched portals offer entry into the main prayer hall. The central arch is the tallest, and features cusped arches typical of the Mughal style. The central arch is flanked by two slightly shorter un-cusped arches, that are designed in the Persian and Central Asian style. These arches are flanked by a smaller arch decorated in a similar style, and a row of 7 small arched portals is found above the tip of each arch. The three central arched portals are embellished with muqarnas above the row of 7 mini-arched portals, while the outermost arches are instead decorated with ghalib kari, or a network of ribs made of stucco and plaster that are applied to curved surfaces in the archways for decorative purposes. Archways into the mosque are also flanked by vegetal motifs along their upper curves, which unlike the green motifs at Badshahi Mosque, are multi-coloured.

Both the interior and exterior feature panels embellished with floral motifs and Quranic calligraphy. The interior of the prayer hall is sheltered beneath the three low fluted domes and is eloquently painted with floral and geometric designs.

== Gallery ==
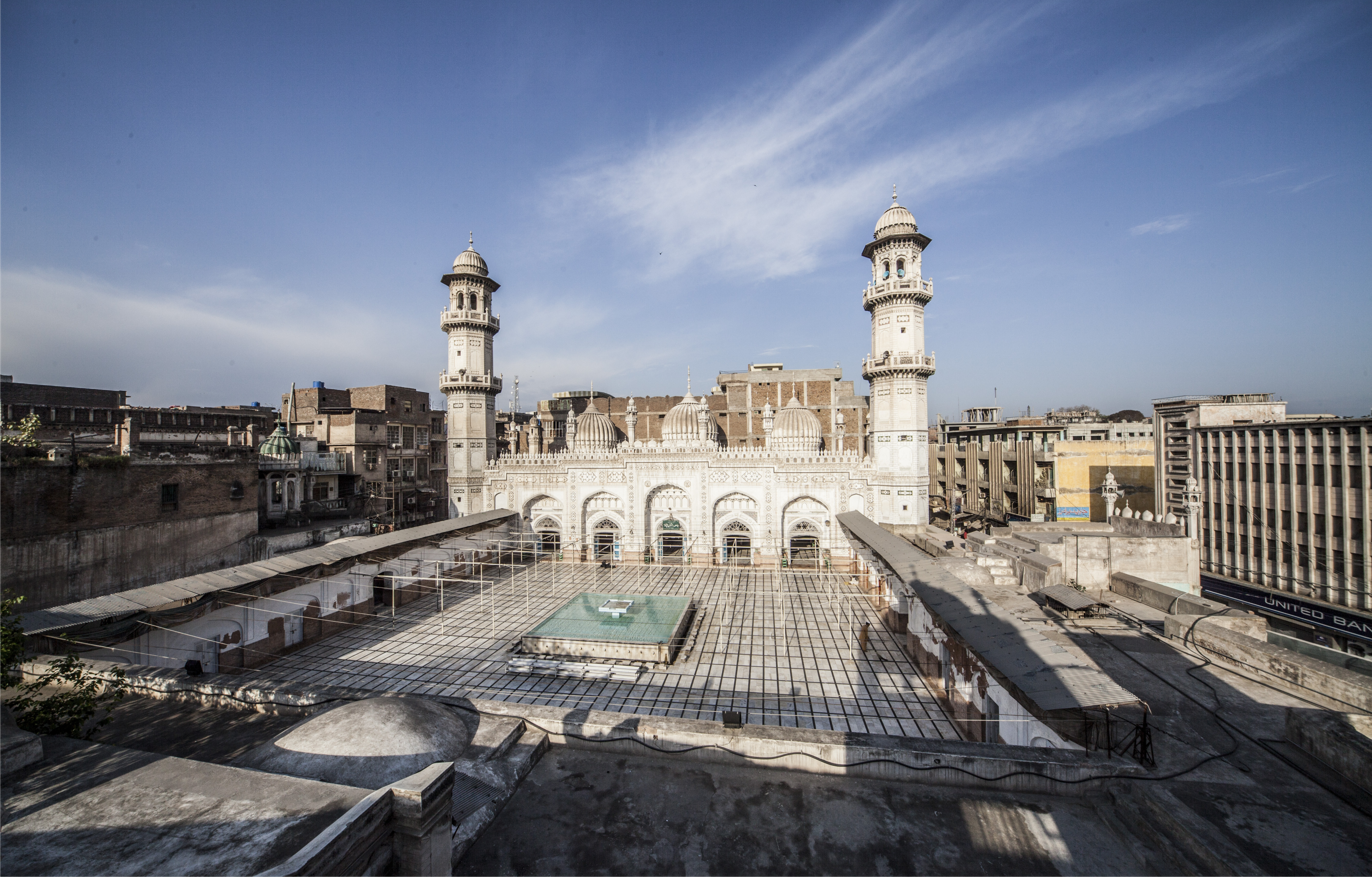

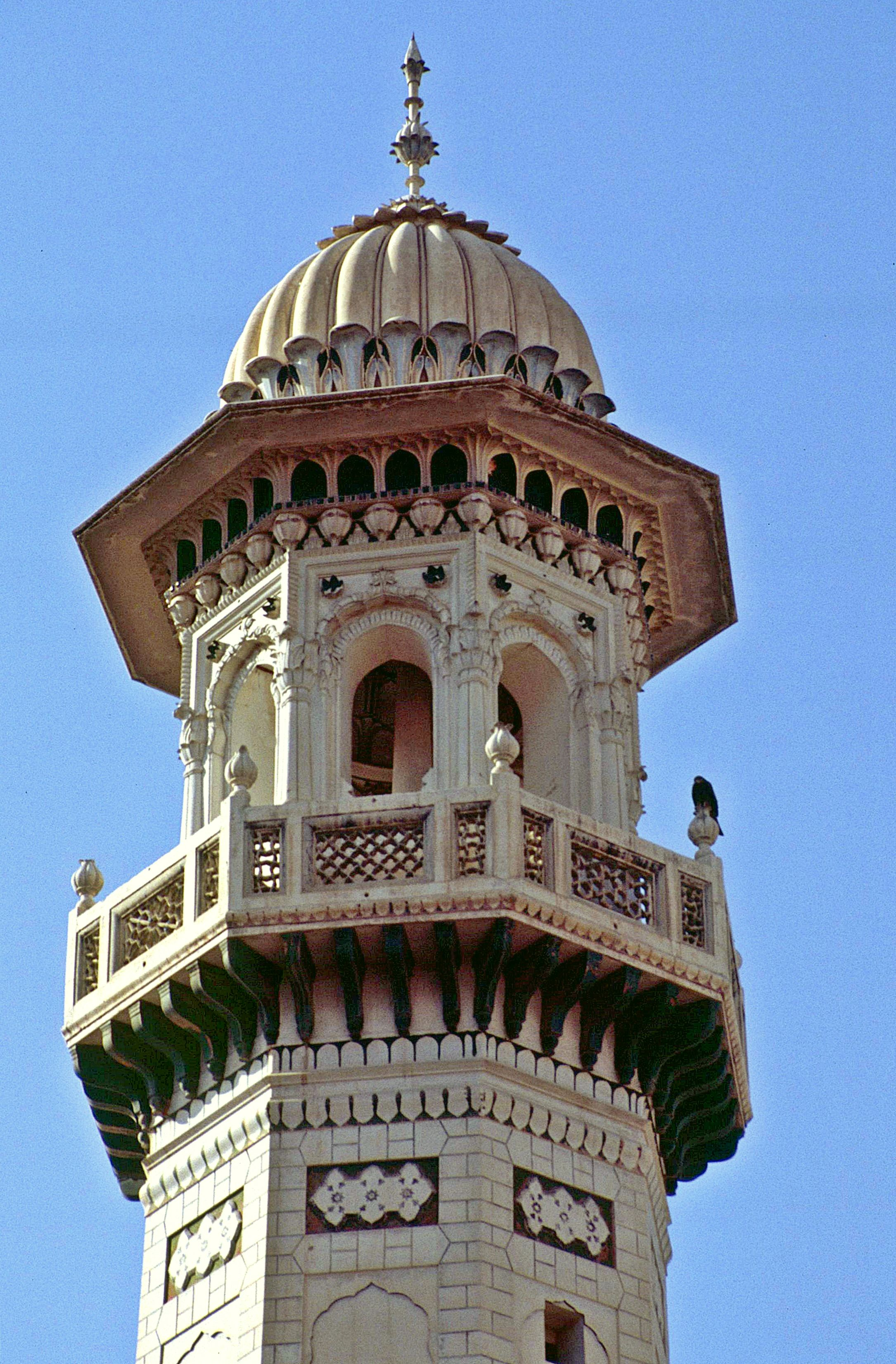
The minarets of the mosque feature cupolas and overhanging eaves

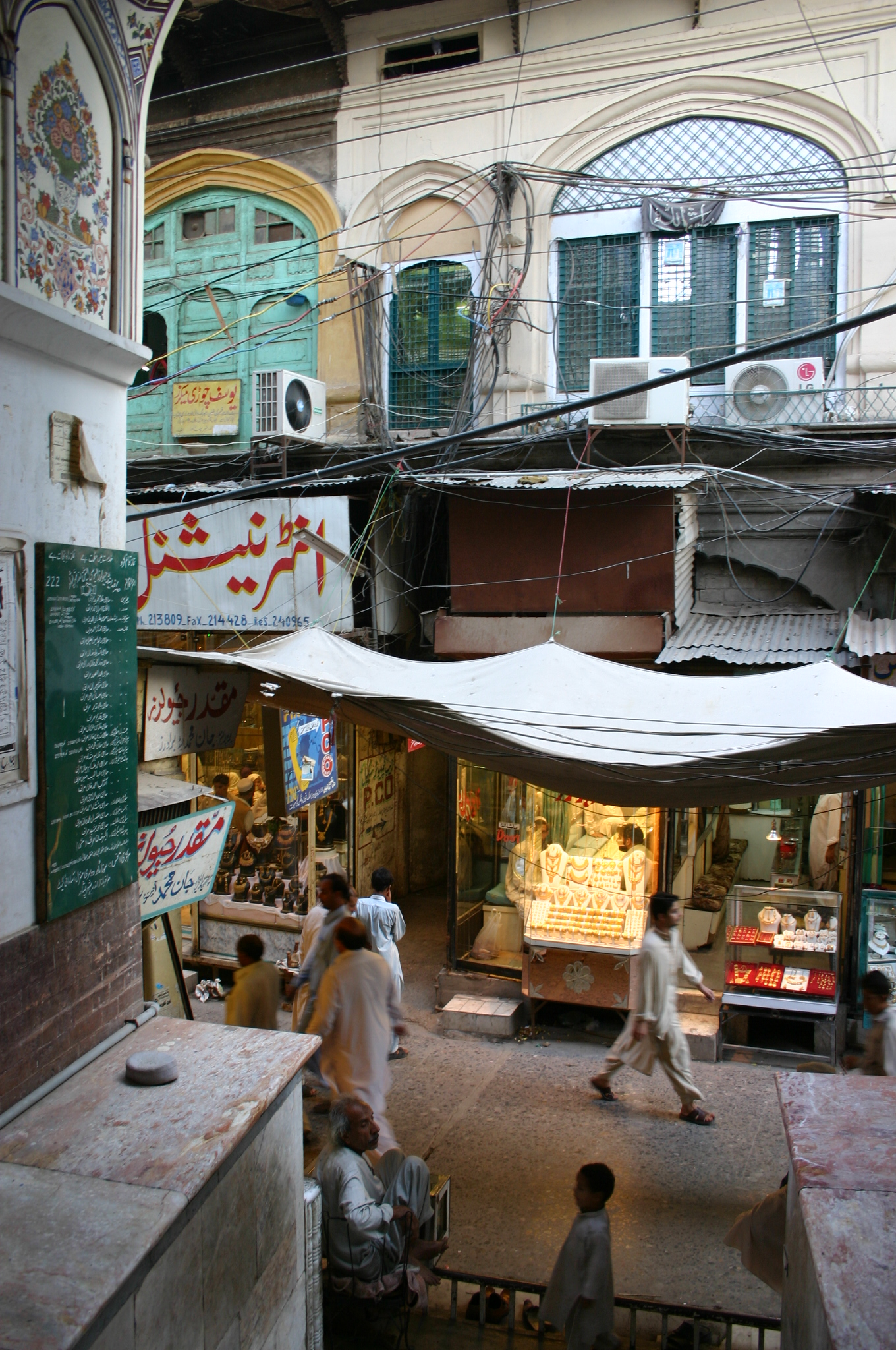
Peshawar's Jeweler's Bazaar is located next to the mosque.

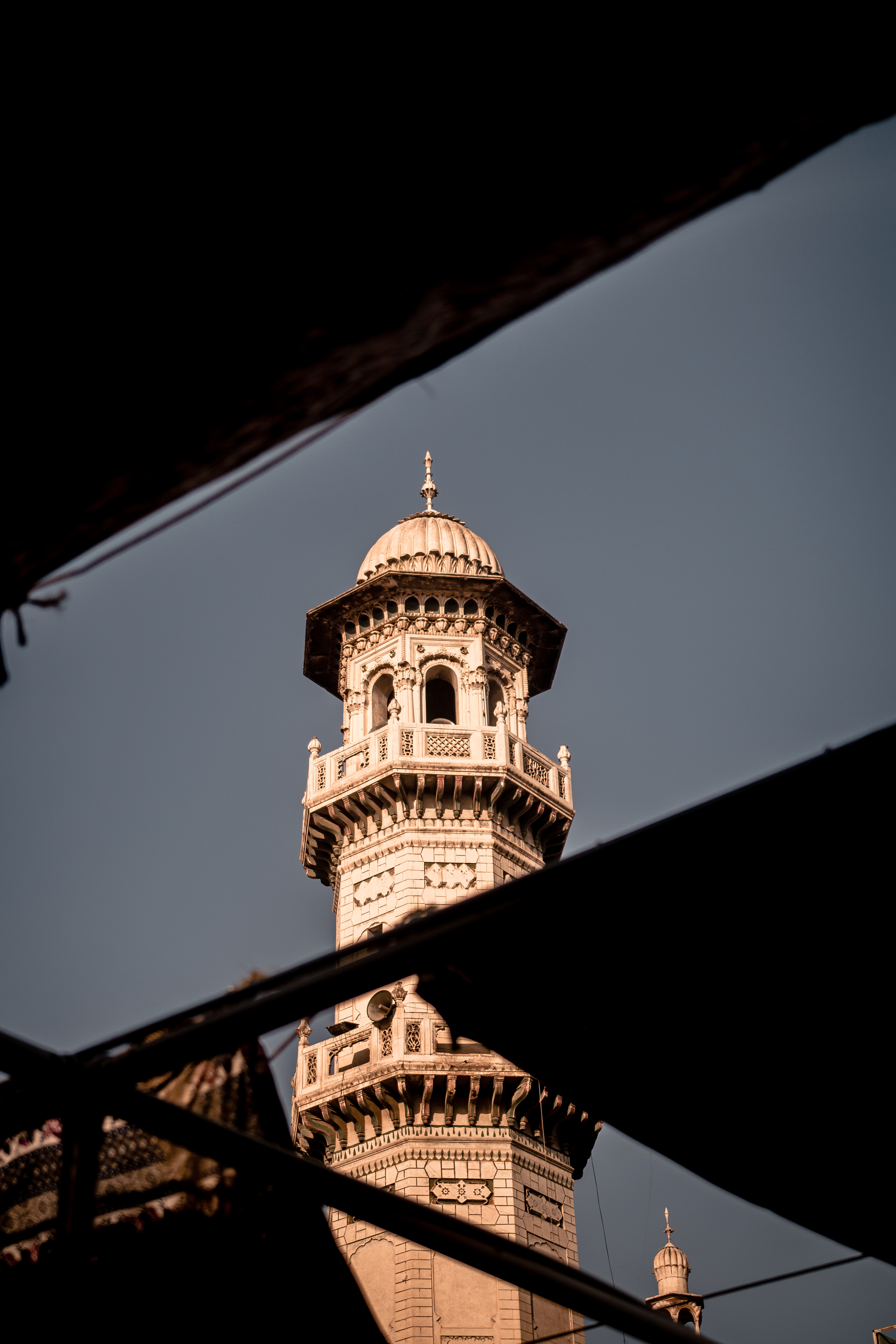
A minaret of the mosque

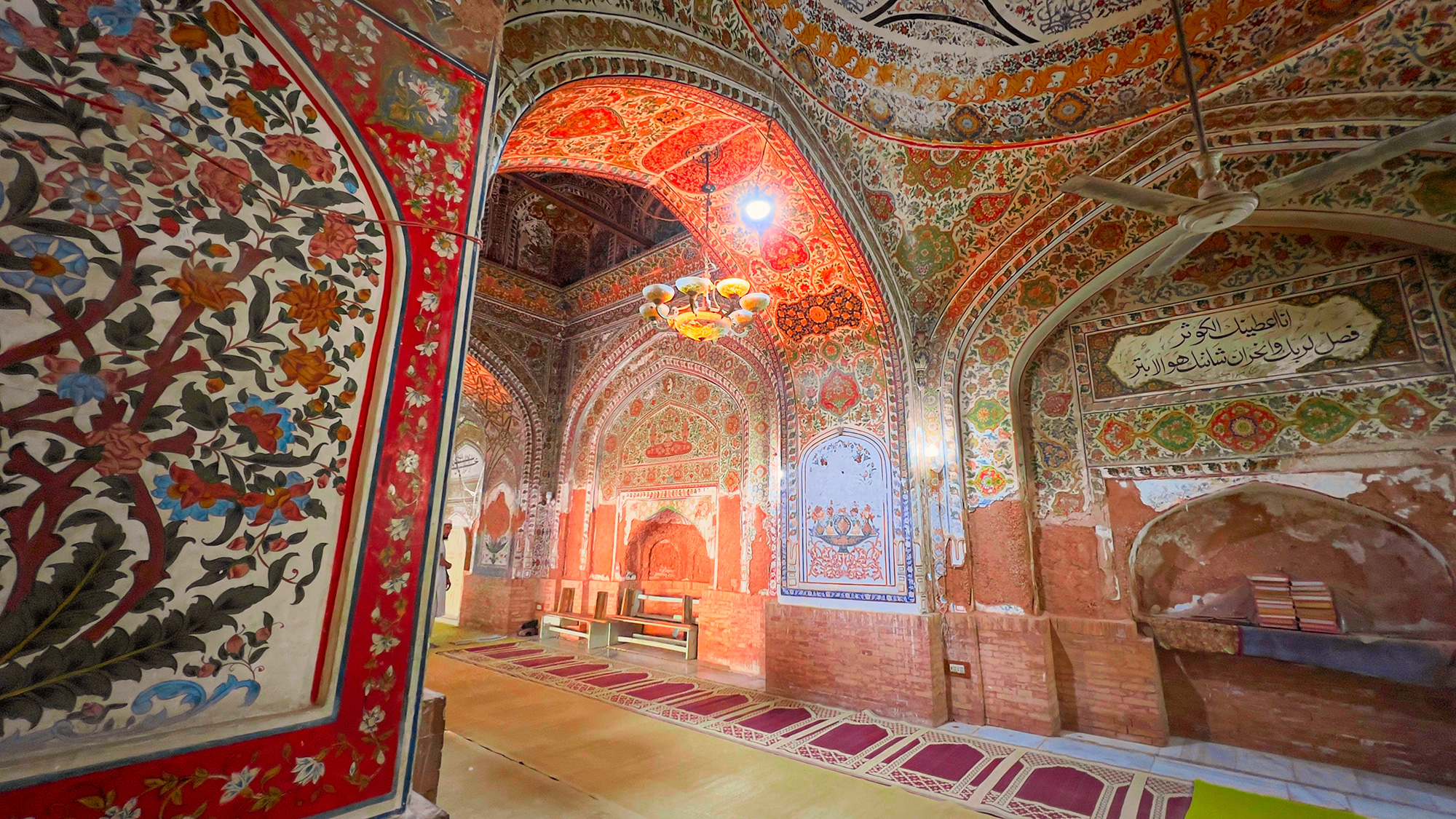
Interior of Mahabat Khan Mosque

== See also ==
- Badshahi Mosque
- Wazir Khan Mosque
- Shah Jahan Mosque
- List of mosques in Pakistan
- Islamic architecture
- Timeline of Islamic history
