= Guzerat =

Guzerat can refer to:

- An alternate spelling for Gujarat, a state in India
- Guzerat cattle
  - Guzerá of Brazil, cross-bred from Indian Kankrej cattle
  - Kankrej cattle of Gujarat

== See also ==
- Gujarat (disambiguation)
