= Gujrat, Mianwali =

Coordinates: 32°21′2″N 71°17′27″E

Gujrat کچا گجرات
- Town and union council
- Interactive map of Gujrat
- Country: Pakistan
- Province: Punjab
- District: Mianwali
- Tehsil: Piplan
- Time zone: UTC+5 (PST)

Gujrat (Urdu: گجرات) is a town and union council of Mianwali District in the Punjab province of Pakistan. It is part of Piplan Tehsil, located at 32°21'2N 71°17'27E at an altitude of 186 m (613 ft).
