= Gujratan =

- Village
- Location in Punjab, India Gujratan (India)
- Coordinates: 31.366352°N 75.796011°E
- Country: India
- State: Punjab
- District: Kapurthala

Government
  - Type: Panchayati raj (India)
  - Body: Gram panchayat

Population (2011)
  - Total: 288
- Sex ratio 146/142♂/♀

Languages
  - Official: Punjabi
  - Other spoken: Hindi
- Time zone: UTC+5:30 (IST)
- PIN: 144626
- Telephone code: 01822
- ISO 3166 code: IN-PB
- Vehicle registration: PB-09
- Website: kapurthala.gov.in

Gujratan is a village in Phagwara Tehsil in Kapurthala district of Punjab State, India. It is located 40 kilometres (25 mi) from Kapurthala, 17 kilometres (11 mi) from Phagwara. The village is administrated by a Sarpanch, who is an elected representative.

== Demography ==
According to the report published by Census India in 2011, Gujratan has 68 houses with the total population of 288 persons of which 146 are male and 142 females. Literacy rate of Gujratan is 79.62%, higher than the state average of 75.84%. The population of children in the age group 0–6 years is 23 which is 7.99% of the total population. Child sex ratio is approximately 1091, higher than the state average of 846.

== Population data ==
Particulars	Total	Male	Female
Total No. of Houses	68	-	-
Population	288	146	142
Child (0-6)	23	11	12
Schedule Caste	188	100	88
Schedule Tribe	0	0	0
Literacy	79.62 %	86.67 %	72.31 %
Total Workers	113	97	16
Main Worker	103	0	0
Marginal Worker	10	6	4

As per census 2011, 113 people were engaged in work activities out of the total population of Gujratan village which includes 97 males and 16 females. According to census survey report 2011, 91.15% workers (Employment or Earning more than 6 Months) describe their work as main work and 8.85% workers are involved in Marginal activity providing livelihood for less than 6 months.

== Caste ==
The village has schedule caste (SC) constitutes 65.28% of total population of the village and it doesn't have any Schedule Tribe (ST) population.
