= Mahabat Khan II =

17th-century Mughal Empire noble

- Painting depicting Luhrasp Khan from the Amber Album, c. 1655-1665, Saint Louis Art Museum

Mir Bakhshi of the Mughal Empire
- In office February 1651 – ?
- Monarch: Shah Jahan

Subahdar of Kabul
- Monarchs: Shah Jahan, Aurangzeb

Subahdar of Gujarat
- In office 1662–1668
- Monarch: Aurangzeb
- Preceded by: Jaswant Singh of Marwar
- Succeeded by: Bahadur Khan

Personal details
- Born: Mirza Luhrasp
- Died: 2 January 1675 Punjab
- Relations: Khan Zaman (brother)
- Parent: Mahabat Khan (father)

Military service
- Battles/wars: Siege of Daulatabad (1633); Mughal Central Asia campaign (1646); Mughal sieges of Kandahar (1649–1653)

Mahabat Khan II (d. 2 January 1675), born Mirza Luhrasp and also known as Luhrasp Khan, was a high-ranking noble of the Mughal Empire during the reigns of emperors Shah Jahan and Aurangzeb. He was a son of the leading Iranian noble Mahabat Khan. During the reign of Shah Jahan, he held the position of mir bakhshi (head of military administration), and participated in several military campaigns across the empire. Under both Shah Jahan and Aurangzeb, he governed the province of Kabul several times. He also governed the province of Gujarat. He had a reputation for being outspoken and was a known critic of the growing political power accorded to the Islamic clergy under Aurangzeb's rule. Scholars have attributed the construction of Peshawar's Mahabat Khan Mosque to him.

== Origins ==
Mirza Luhrasp was the second son of Zamana Beg, titled Mahabat Khan, a high ranking Iranian noble in the Mughal Empire and military general of emperor Jahangir's reign, who is known for staging a coup and keeping Jahangir hostage. He went on to lead several military campaigns under Shah Jahan, and died in 1634. Mirza Luhrasp's older brother was Amanallah Husayni, entitled Khan Zaman, a military general.

== Career ==
=== Reign of Shah Jahan ===
Mirza Luhrasp began his career in the Mughal service during the early reign of emperor Shah Jahan, participating in the Siege of Daulatabad (1633), a military campaign led by his father. In 1637 he was bestowed the honorific Khan, thenceforth known as Luhrasp Khan. In 1642 he defended Kandahar from Persians alongside prince Dara Shikoh and Raja Jai Singh. He participated in the Mughal incursions in Balkh in 1646 alongside Asalat Khan. In February 1651 he was appointed as the empire's mir bakhshi (head of military administration), making him the second-most powerful official of the empire. In 1652 he inherited his father's title of 'Mahabat Khan'.

Mahabat Khan acted as interim governor of Kabul Subah in 1650 on behalf of a noble named Said Khan as the latter had not yet reached Kabul. In 1651 he became its official governor alongside Dara Shikoh, serving through 1655. After the Mughals lost Kandahar to the Safavid Empire, Mahabat Khan participated in the second and third unsuccessful sieges to retrieve the city. Mahabat Khan served alongside Jai Singh in the second siege. The third siege took place in 1653 under Dara Shikoh; Mahabat Khan contributed 30 lakh rupees towards the military campaign. He was appointed to the governorship of Kabul once again in the latter part of the 1650s. In 1657 he fought in Mughal campaigns against the Bijapur Sultanate.

=== Reign of Aurangzeb ===
During Aurangzeb's reign, Mahabat Khan was appointed as governor of Gujarat in 1662, succeeding Jaswant Singh. He served for six years until he was succeeded by Bahadur Khan in 1668. He was also assigned to the governorship of Kabul multiple times. Mahabat Khan had a diplomatic relationship with Khushal Khan Khattak, and had been his patron since the reign of Shah Jahan. Mahabat Khan's assignment to Kabul in 1669 was to combat growing Pashtun rebellion, but he was replaced by Muhammad Amin Khan in August 1670. He was briefly sent to lead military campaigns in the Deccan, but was recalled after being suspected of collusion with Maratha chief Shivaji and assigned back to Kabul to deal with rebels in the Mughal-Afghan war. Mahabat Khan's diplomacy with Khushal Khan Khattak was largely ineffective and later Aurangzeb personally came to Hasan Abdal to resolve unrest at the empire's frontier.

Mahabat Khan was known to be outspoken on Aurangzeb's political decisions. In a letter to the emperor, he was critical of the increased power that the Islamic judges (qazi) enjoyed under Aurangzeb, and expressed disapproval on the importance given to Islamic theologians' opinions on political matters. He may have held a personal grudge against Aurangzeb's chief qazi, Abdul Wahhab.

Scholars have attributed the construction of the Mahabat Khan Mosque in Peshawar to Mahabat Khan Luhrasp, on account of verbal traditions and his continued presence in the region as governor of Kabul. The date of construction is unclear.

Mahabat Khan died on 2 January 1675, in the Punjab.
