= Gujranwala (disambiguation) =

Gujranwala is a city in the Punjab province of Pakistan.

Gujranwala may also refer to:

- Gujranwala Division, a third-tier administrative subdivision in Punjab, Pakistan
- Gujranwala District, a district in Punjab, Pakistan encompassing the city of Gujranwala and surrounding areas
- Gujranwala Cantonment, a military cantonment in Gujranwala
- Gujranwala cricket team
