= Gujarat Subah =

Subdivision of the Mughal Empire between 1573–1756

Gujarat Subah Gujarāta subā (Gujarati)
- 1573–1756
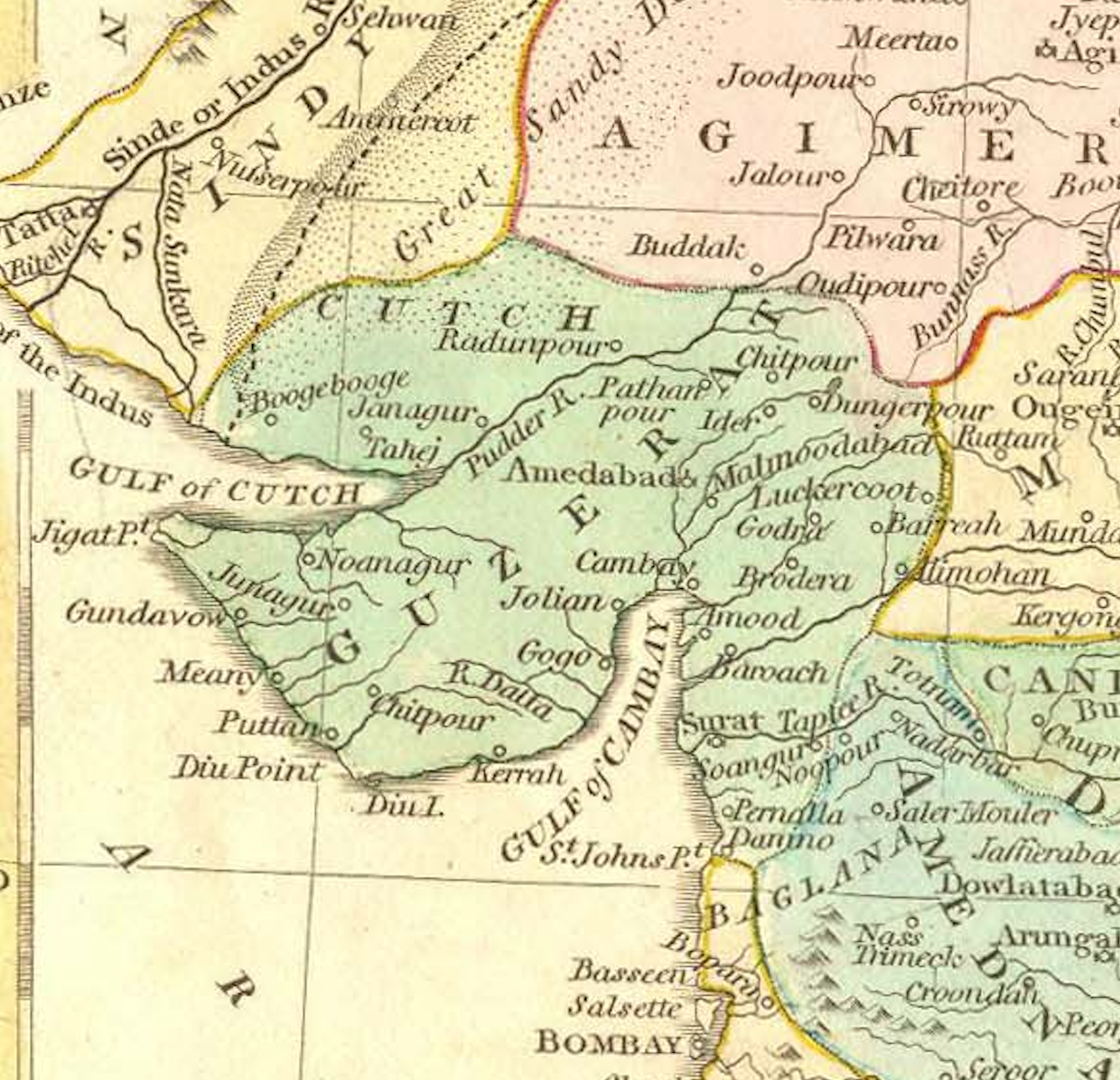
- Gujarat Subah depicted in map of Mughal Empire by Robert Wilkinson (1805)
- Capital: Ahmedabad
- Government: Viceroyalty
- Historical era: Early modern period
  - Established: 1573
  - Disestablished: 1756

Area
  - 1601: 77,879 sq mi (201,710 km^{2})
Preceded by	Succeeded by
Gujarat Sultanate	Maratha Confederacy
- Today part of: India

The Gujarat Subah (Persian: صوبه گجرات) was a province (subah) of the Mughal Empire, encompassing the Gujarat region. The region first fell under Mughal control in 1573, when the Mughal emperor Akbar (r. 1556–1605) defeated the Gujarat Sultanate under Muzaffar Shah III.

Muzaffar tried to regain the Sultanate in 1584 but failed. Gujarat remained the Mughal province governed by the viceroys and officers appointed by the Mughal emperors from Delhi. Akbar's foster brother Mirza Aziz Kokaltash was appointed as the subahdar (viceroy) who strengthened Mughal hold over the region. The nobles of former Sultanate continued to resist and rebel during the reign of the next emperor Jahangir (1605–1627) but Kokaltash and his successor subahdars subdued them. Jehangir also permitted the British East India Company to establish factories in Surat and elsewhere in Gujarat. The next emperor Shah Jahan (1627–1658) expanded his territories in south and his subahdars made hold over Kathiawar peninsula including Nawanagar. Shah Jahan had also appointed his prince Aurangzeb, who was involved in religious disputes, prince Dara Shikoh and later prince Murad Bakhsh as subahdars. Following battle of succession, Aurangzeb (1658–1707) came to the Mughal throne and his policies resulted in revolts and discontent. During his reign, the Maratha Kingdom under Shivaji raided Surat (1666) and their incursions in Gujarat started. Till then Gujarat prospered due to political stability, peace and growing international trade.

During the next three emperors (1707–1719) who had brief reigns, the nobles became more and more powerful due to instability in the Delhi. The royals of Marwar were appointed viceroys frequently. During the reign of the emperor Muhammad Shah (1719–1748), the struggle between the Mughal and Maratha nobles were heightened with frequent battles and incursions. The south Gujarat was lost to the Marathas and the towns in north and central Gujarat was attacked on several occasions with frequent demand of tributes. The Marathas continued to grow their hold and the frequent change of viceroys did not reverse the trend. The competing houses of Marathas, Gaekwads and Peshwas engaged between themselves which slow down their progress for a while. They later made peace between themselves. During the reign of the next emperor Ahmad Shah Bahadur (1748–1754), there was nominal control over the nobles who acted on their own. There were frequent fights between themselves and with Marathas. Ahmedabad, the capital of province, finally fell to the Marathas in 1752. It was regained by noble Momin Khan for a short time but again lost to the Marathas in 1756 after a long siege. Finding opportunity, the British captured Surat in 1759. After a setback at Panipat in 1761, the Marathas strengthened their hold on Gujarat. During this fifty years, the power struggle between the Mughal nobles and Marathas caused disorder and the decline in prosperity.

== History ==
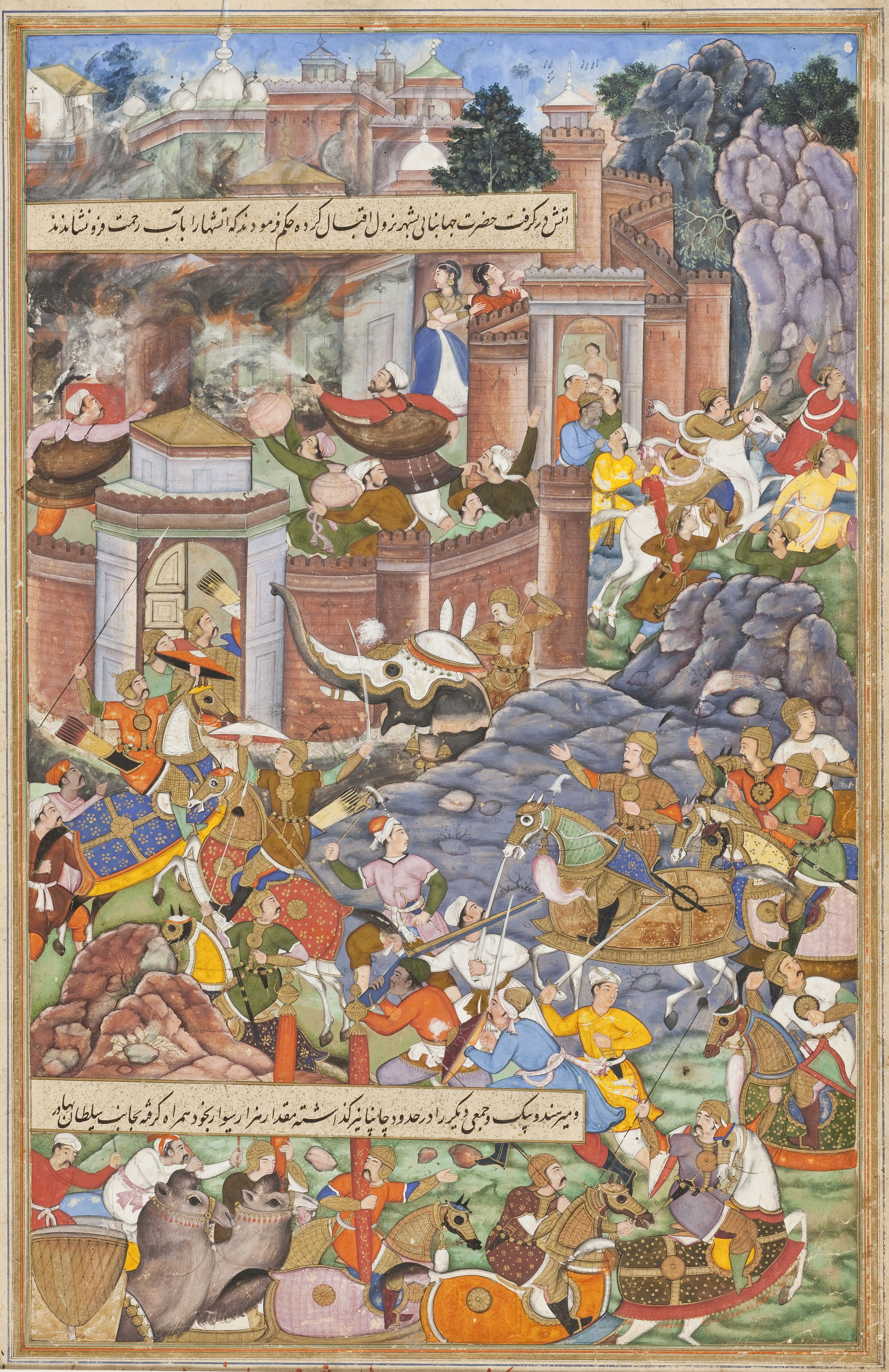
Humayun fights Bahadur Shah of Gujarat, in the year 1535.

=== Under Humayun (1535–1536) ===
In 1532–1533, Gujarat Sultan Bahadur Shah provoked a war with Humayun, the Mughal Emperor of Delhi. The immediate cause of the hostility is understood to be Bahadur Shah's protection of Muhammad Zaman Mirza, a Timurid prince and brother-in-law of Humayun, who had previous plotted against Humayun and his government and had subsequently been held in confinement. This antagonism was furthered by Bahadur Shah's favorable reception of the Afghan princes of the Lodi dynasty (rules of the Delhi Sultanate) who had offended the Mughal Empire. As Bahadur Shah failed to extradite Muhammad Zaman Mirza, Humayun marched from Agra towards Chittor; he waited idly by Gwalior while Bahadur Shah laid siege to Chittor.

Bahadur Shah listened to the advice of Rumi Khan—who was considered to have secretly allied with Humayun after Bahadur Shah refused to uphold the promise of putting him in command of Chittor—over that of Taj Khan and Sadr Khan and established a fortified camp near Mandasor. While Bahadur Shah had significant artillery, Humayun took Rumi Khan's advice and cut Bahadur Shah's supplies. The highly effective blockade and the realization of Rumi Khan's betrayal forced Bahadur Shah to flee from the camp in April 1535. After fleeing Mandasor, Bahadur Shah took refuge in the hill-fortress of Mandu, which was summarily stormed by Humayun's troops. As a result, Malwa was annexed under the Mughal Empire and Bahadur Shah escaped first to Champaner via Songarh, next to Khambhat, and finally to Diu.

Humayun kept pursuit of Bahadur Shah until he found out that the latter had successfully retreated to Diu. Having abandoned his pursuit, Humayun encamped at Khambhat where an old aboriginal woman warned him of an upcoming night attack by 5,000–6,000 members of the Koli and Gowar tribes. Humayun was able to route the attack on account of the warning; however, given the perceived insult, he ordered the town of Khambhat to be set on fire and plundered. After being convinced to postpone the attack on Diu, Humayun returned to successfully lay siege to Champaner in August 1535.

In settling the government of Gujarat, Humayun nominated Mirza Askari, his brother, as the viceroy. Before he could resume his pursuit of Bahadur Shah, he received news that the eastern provinces of the Mughal Empire were revolting under Sher Khan Afghan and that the imperial garrisons in Malwa were being challenged by the local chieftains. No sooner had Humayun turned to attend to these matters, a counter was launched with Bahadur Shah's officers reclaiming the towns of Surat, Bharuch, and Khambhat. Bahadur Shah marched towards Ahmedabad while amassing an army but Mirza Askari and his army retreated without engaging in battle. Bahadur Shah continued to pursue the retreating forces defeating them in battle at Kanij near Mahemdavad. Under instruction from Humayun, Tardi Beg is said to have abandoned Champaner finally marking the end of the Mughal occupation of Gujarat under Humayun.

Having to deal with Humayun's march on the one side and the Portuguese attack at Diu on the other side, Bahadur Shah entered into the Treaty of Bassein in December 1534. The treaty granted the Portuguese Empire control of the town of Bassein (Vasai), required vessels bound for the Red Sea to call at Bassein to procure passes and pay customary dues on their return trip, and prohibited the building of warships at any of the Gujarat ports. At a later time, following his retreat to Diu, Bahadur Shah turned to the Portuguese Empire for assistance and entered into a second treaty with them in October 1535 granting them permission to build a fort at Diu in exchange for military assistance.

=== Under Akbar (1573–1605) ===
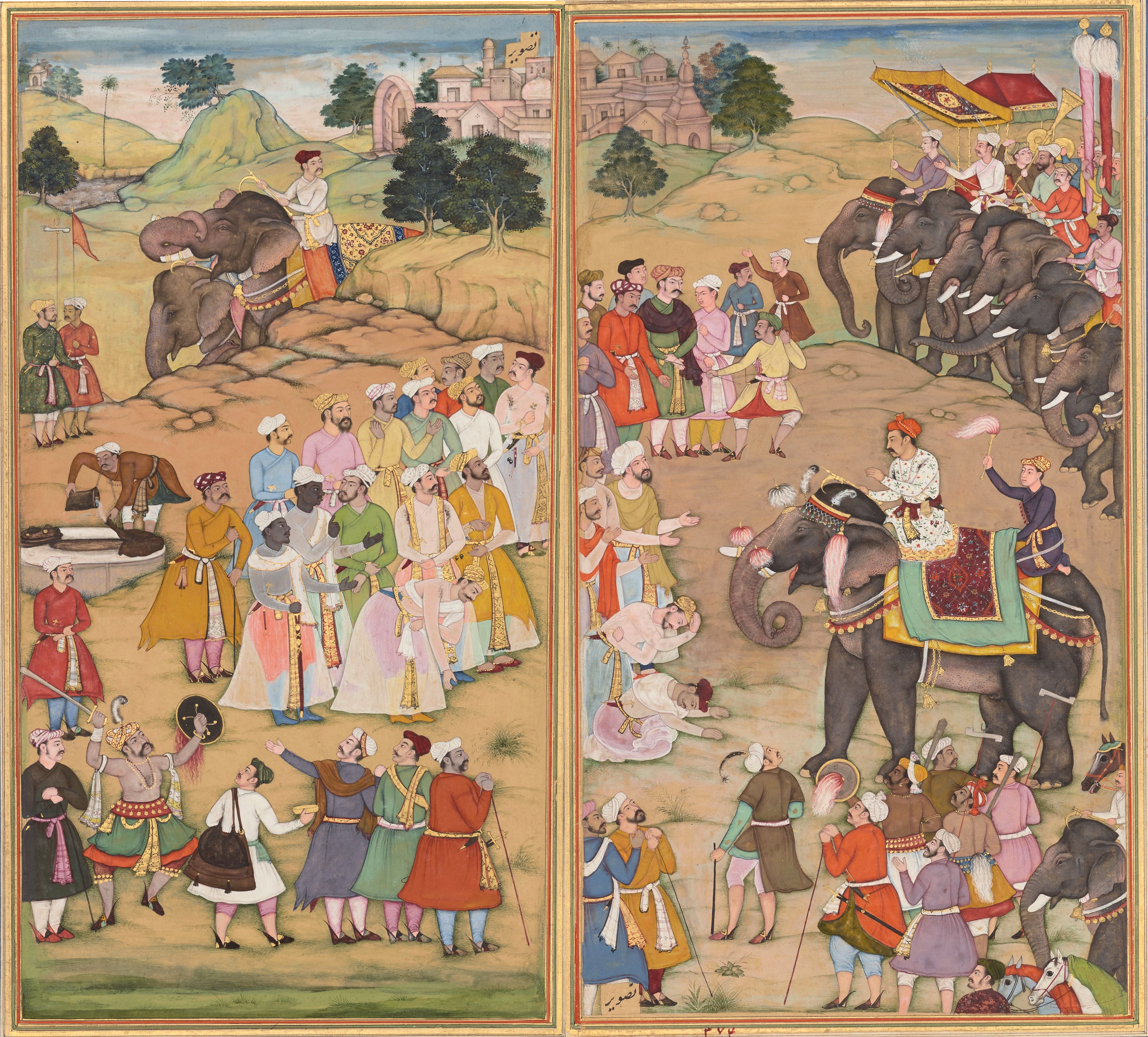
Akbar receives homage from Itimad Khan and the nobles of Gujarat in 1572.

In 1572–1573, Mughal Emperor Akbar conquered Gujarat Sultanate (now Gujarat, India) taking advantage of the puppet-ruler Sultan Muzaffar Shah III and his quarreling nobles. Muzaffar was held captive at Agra. Akbar appointed his foster brother Mirza Aziz Koka, the Khan-i-Azam, as the first viceroy who faced an insurrection by the rebel nobles of the former Sultanate. Akbar quickly came to aid, arrested the Gujarati nobles, and ended the insurrection. Raja Todar Mal was tasked to survey the land and fix the assessment in order to settle the land revenues. The viceroy Shihab-ud-din Ahmad Khan strengthened the cavalry and decreased crime. Sultan Muzaffar III escaped in 1578, returned with dissident troops that previously worked for ex-viceroy Shihab-ud-dín Ahmad Khan in 1583, and led an attack on Ahmedabad and recaptured it when the then viceroy Itimad Khan mistakenly left the city. Upon hearing of the events in Gujarat, Akbar reappointed Mirza Abdurrahim Khan (commonly known as Mirza Khan) as the viceroy who defeated Muzaffar III in the battle of Fateh Bagh in January 1584. Mirza Aziz Koka was appointed as the viceroy for a second time and defeated the combined forces of Sultan Muzaffar III, Jam of Navanagar, Daulat Khan Ghori of Junagadh, and the Kathi Loma Khuman in the battle of Bhuchar Mori. Muzaffar III was captured in Bhuj but he committed suicide, putting an end to the Gujarat Sultanate. Mirza Aziz Koka conquered Junagadh and established Mughal authority over Saurashtra in 1592 before leaving for Mecca on pilgrimage in 1593. Subsequently, Prince Murad Bakhsh was appointed as the viceroy on whose death, Mirza Aziz Koka returned a third time as the viceroy serving through his sons . Akbar was succeeded by Jahangir.

=== Under Jahangir (1605–1627) ===
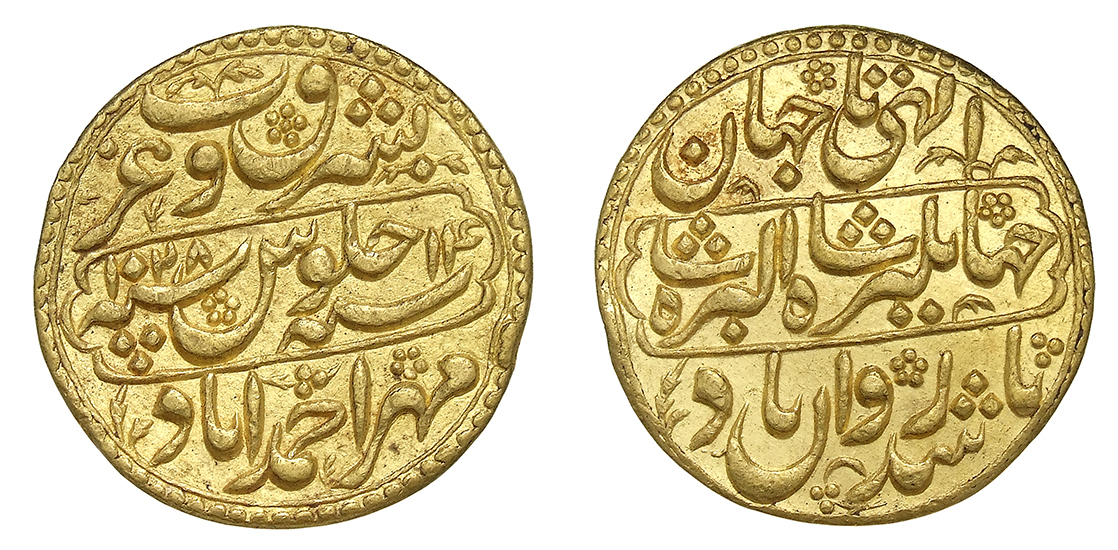
Gold mohur minted in Jahangir's name in Ahmedabad

Jahangir appointed Qulij Khan was as the viceroy of Gujarat in the first year of his reign. However, on account of Qulij Khan being called to Punjab and Sultan Muzaffar Shah III's son, Prince Bahadur, leading an insurrection around Ahmedabad, Jahangir sent Raja Vikramajit to Gujarat as his next viceroy. He was succeeded by Shaikh Farid-i-Bukhari (honored with the title of Murtaza Khan), a scholar and a military commander, who was responsible for constructing the fort of Kadi, a town in the Mehsana district. Mirza Aziz Koka was appointed as the viceroy for a fourth time but was asked to rule through his son Jahangir Quli Khan as his deputy; they subdued the rebellions and protests of the nobles of the former Sultanate and of the Hindu chiefs and successfully averted an invasion by Malik Ambar from Daulatabad in the south. The next viceroy Abdulla Khan Bahadur Firuz Jang undertook expeditions against the Nizam Shahi kingdom of Ahmednagar. Under Jahangir, the British East India Company was permitted to establish factories in Surat in 1612. During reign of the next viceroy Muqarrab Khan, Jahangir arrived at Ahmedabad for an extended visit to Gujarat. In January 1618, he appointed his son Prince Shah Jahan as the next viceroy. Shah Jahan rebelled against his father, Jahangir, in 1622–1623 and he was replaced by Prince Dawar Bakhsh (also known as Sultan Bulaqi) whose imperial forces recovered Bharuch and Surat. Upon the death of Dawar Bakhsh's guardian (Mirza Aziz Koka), Khan Jahan was briefly appointed as the viceroy. Subsequently, Saif Khan served as the viceroy of Gujarat until the end of Jahangir's reign and Shah Jahan's ascension in 1627.

Following his appointment as viceroy in 1618, Prince Shah Jahan governed through his deputies Rustam Khan and Raja Vikramjit until the start of his rebellion against Jahangir in 1622. During this time, land was acquired in the suburb of Maqsudpur on the banks of the Sabarmati River for a royal garden, which later came to be known as Shahi Bagh.

=== Under Shah Jahan (1627–1658) ===
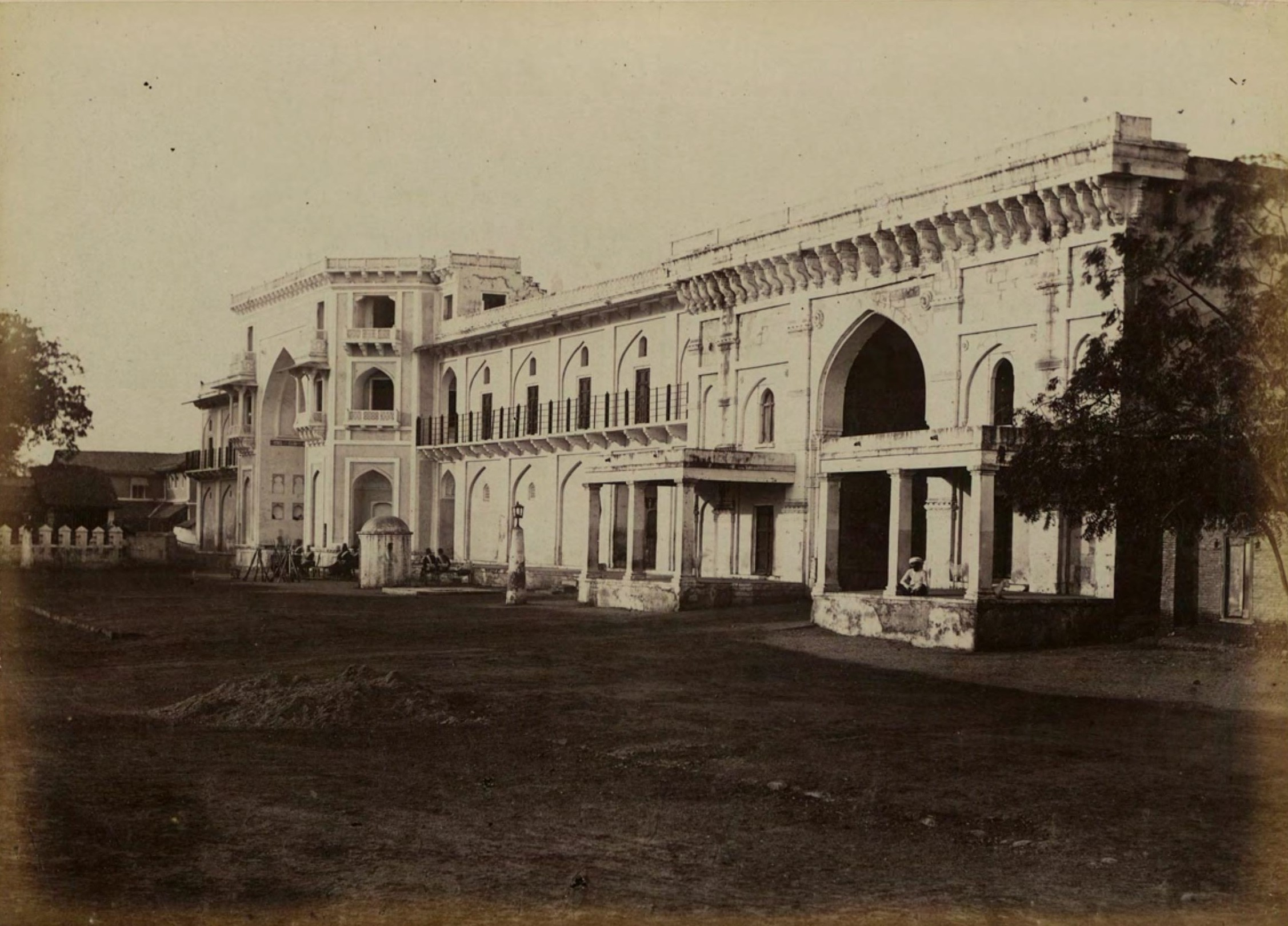
Sarai built by Azam Khan adjoining the Bhadra Fort, Ahmedabad

On the death of Jahangir in 1627, his son Shah Jahan formally ascended to the throne in February 1628. Under Shah Jahan, Sher Khan Tur (Nahir Khan) was first appointed viceroy in 1628. This marked the start of expansion efforts south with attacks on the districts of Nasik, Sangamner, and Baglan, including the capture of the fort of Chandor. After Sher Khan Tur and until 1635, three nobles—Islam Khan, Baqir Khan, Sipahdar Khan—were appointed as viceroys because they sent expensive gifts to the emperor. Thereafter, Saif Khan, who previously served as the effective viceroy in the last years of Jahangir, was appointed as viceroy; he was then replaced by Azam Khan who served as viceroy until 1642. Azam Khan is said to have brought order to the province by subduing the Chunvalis Kolis in the northeast and the Kathi tribes near Dhandhuka terrorizing them by the destruction of their crops and their plantations. Through the Jam Lakhaji of Nawanagar, he set an example with regards to the collection of tribute from the Rajput chiefs of Saurashtra, who defied imperial authority and disobeyed the viceroys. Mirza Isa Tarkhan, who was appointed the next viceroy, carried out financial reforms by introducing bhagvatai or the "share system of levying revenue in kind."

After being appointed as the viceroy of Gujarat in 1645, Prince Aurangzeb was in involved in religious dispute with both Hindus and Muslims. He ordered the conversion of the Jain temple of Chintamani at Saraspur—built by a jeweler named Shantidas in 1625—into a mosque named 'Quvvat-ul-Islam'. Aurangzeb also issued an injunction against the dilution of indigo with dust and white sand. Aurangzeb was recalled in 1646 to assist with the conquest of Balkh and Badakhshan and was replaced by Shaistah Khan. Shaishtah Khan failed to subdue the Chunvalis Kolis and attempted to monopolize indigo and other goods by buying them from tradesmen at his own rates. Thereafter, Prince Dara Shukoh was appointed viceroy of Gujarat whose deputy Ghairat Khan (Baqir Beg) brought along an imperial decree that partially restored the Jain temple of Chintamani back to Shantidas. Shaistah Khan was then appointed viceroy of Gujarat for a second time and undertook campaigns against the Chunvalis Kolis and carried out repairs for the city-walls of Ahmedabad. In 1654, Prince Murad Bakhsh was appointed the viceroy of Gujarat. In 1657, hearing news of Shah Jahan's severe illness, Murad Bakhsh claimed the Mughal throne, annexed Surat to collect resources for his campaign, and formed an alliance with Aurangzeb with an informal arrangement for the division of the Mughal Empire.

Shah Jahan appointed the Maharaja of Marwar, Jaswant Singh of Jodhpur and Qasim Khan as the viceroys of Malwa and Gujarat, respectively; Murad Bakhsh was instructed to proceed to Berar and the newly appointed viceroys were ordered to engage with Murad Bakhsh if he failed to comply with the commands. The combined forces of Murad Bakhsh and Aurangzeb defeated the imperial generals at the battle of Dharmat. They subsequently faced and defeated the army of Prince Dara Shikoh at the Battle of Samugarh, eight miles from Agra Fort. Soon after, Aurangzeb imprisoned Murad Bakhsh (for killing his Diwan, Ali Naqi, in Ahmedabad in 1657), confined Shah Jahan, and declared himself the emperor in 1658.

Gujarat experienced a severe famine in 1630–1631 resulting in significant deaths of men, women, and cattle.

=== Under Aurangzeb (1658–1707) ===
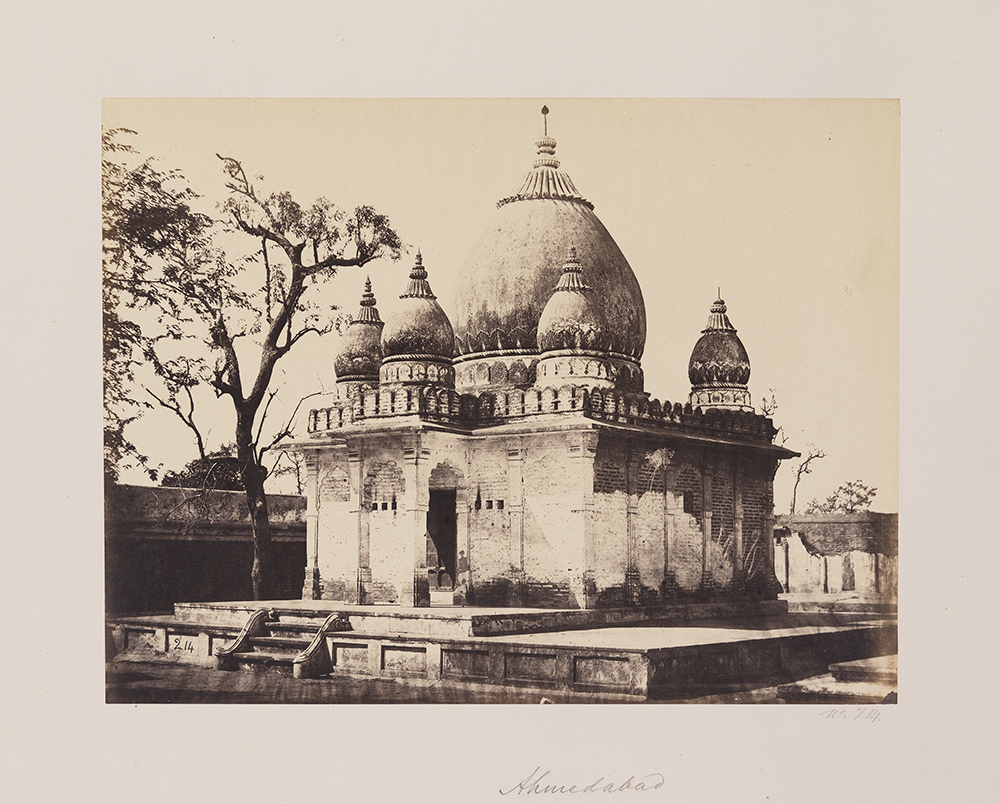
Roza of Sardar Khan, who served as fauzdar of Bharuch and Sorath during the reign of Aurangzeb

After the imprisonment of Prince Murad Bakhsh and the desertion of Prince Dara Shikoh, Aurangzeb went through his first coronation in July 1658. As reward for deserting Dara Shikoh before the battle of Deorai, Aurangzeb appointed Raja Jaswant Singh of Jodhpur as viceroy of Gujarat and restored to him the title of "Maharaja". Qutb-ud-din Khan served as acting viceroy after Maharaja Jaswant Singh and temporarily annexed Navanagar (renamed to Islamnagar) into the Mughal Empire. He was succeeded by Mahabat Khan as the next viceroy of Gujarat.

Edicts issued by Aurangzeb include a ban of the cultivation of the poppy plant and the appointment of a censor of public morals to enforce the laws of Islam and a prohibition of intoxicants (distilled spirits, bhang, etc.). Aurangzeb's farman of 1665 prohibited a large number of illegal and burdensome taxes levied by the imperial officials of Gujarat. In the same farman, Aurangzeb required Hindu merchants to keep their shops open on the auspicious days of pancham, amvas, and the ekadashi. Moreover, he ordered his officers to prevent Hindus from lighting Diwali lamps in bazaars, to stop the theft of sticks for use in Holi fires, banned the use of obscene language on Diwali and Holi, and ordered potters to not make statues of animate beings on the festivals of 'Id, Shab-i-Barat and days of ‘Urs. He enacted excise duties on the sale of commodities valued over Rs. 52 with Muslims paying 2.5% Hindus paying 5.0%. Within two years, the duty on Muslims was remitted but kept for Hindus, and officials were ordered to ensure Hindus did not mix their goods with those of Muslims to avoid the tax.

In January 1664, Maratha leader Shivaji plundered Surat and emptied its riches. Under the next viceroy Bahadur Khan (Khan Jahan Koka), on account of Shivaji's attacks against the state and island-fortress of Janjira, an alliance was struck the Sidi ruler of Janjira and the Mughal Empire. Maharaja Jaswant Singh was appointed the viceroy for a second time and Navanagar was partially restored to its ruler. The next viceroy, Muhammad Amin Khan, took office in 1672 and, unusually, held it for a long period of 10 years. During this time, Muhammad Amin Khan dealt with the revolt of Rao Gopinath, the ruler of Idar, a number of edicts from Aurangzeb highlighting the theocratic of his rule, and the jaziya (capitation tax) on all non-Muslims throughout the Mughal Empire (poor paid 12 dirhams per head, middle class paid 24 dirhams per head, and the rich paid 48 dirhams per head).

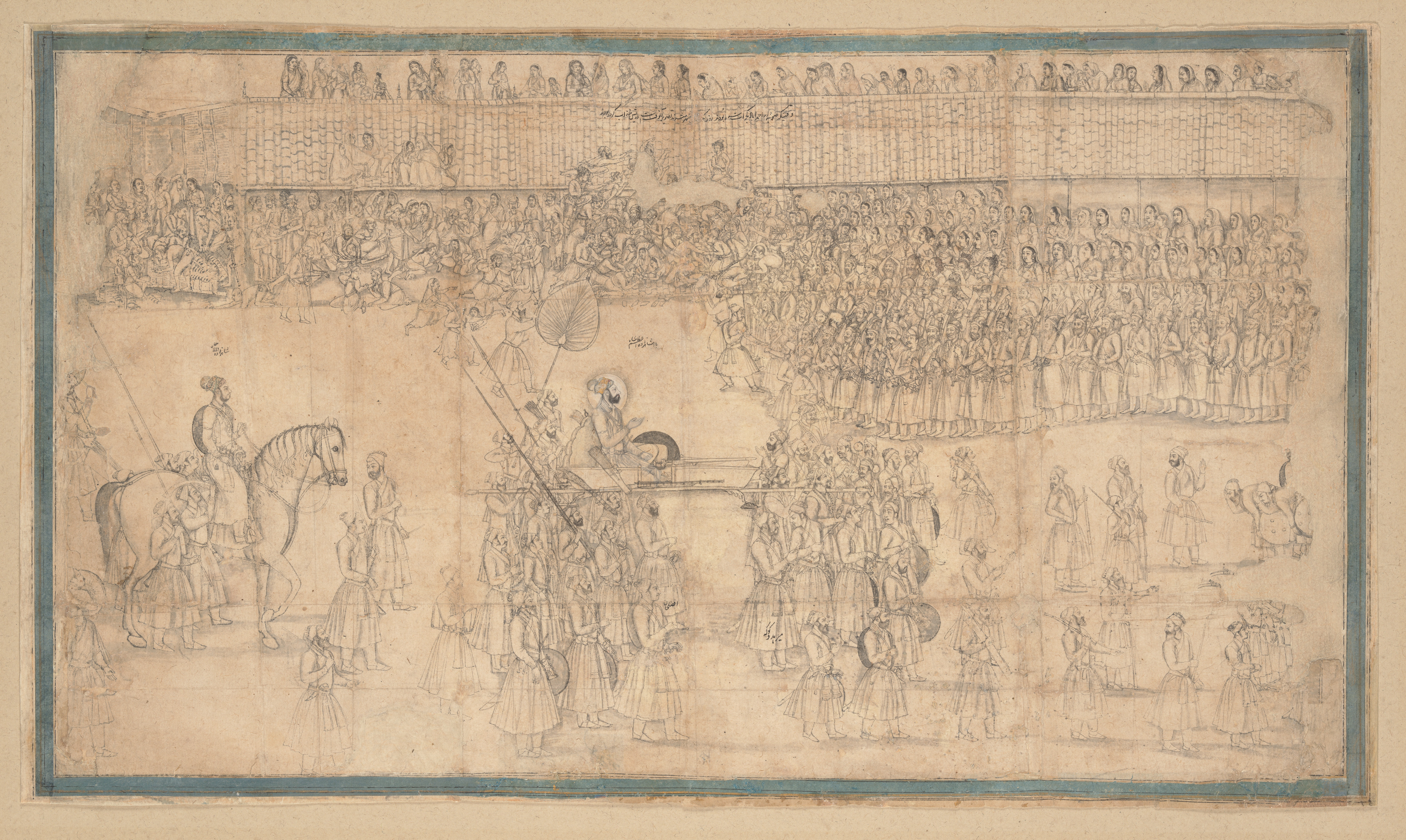
Prince Azam Shah enters Ahmedabad, by Chitarman II (Kalyan Das) c. 1701.

Under Aurangzeb's reign, measures were undertaken for the conservation of public monuments and for repairs to fortifications including the fort of Azamabad, the fort of Junagadh, the city-walls of Ahmedabad, and the royal palaces in the Bhadra citadel. Under the next viceroy, Mukhtar Khan, Ahmedabad faced a flood and a famine. Shujaat Khan (Kartalab Khan) held office as the next viceroy for sixteen years ending his tenure with broad popularity among the citizens of Gujarat. He contained a revolt of Shia Muslims (Momnas and Matias who were members of the Imam Shahi sect) in 1691 and undertook a campaign against the Khachars and other Kathi tribes wherein he attacked the fort of Than and destroyed the ancient temple of the Sun. In 1694, Shujaat Khan received orders from Aurangzeb to demolish the temple at Vadnagar. He was initially entrusted the command of the war against the Rathors of Marwar and later negotiated peace arrangements with Durgadas Rathod of Marwar. Following Shujaat Khan's death, Prince Muhammad Azam Shah was appointed as the viceroy. Upon Aurangzeb's orders, Prince Muhammad Azam ordered Durgadas to attend court in Ahmedabad in the hopes of imprisoning or killing him with the help of Safdar Khan Babi; however, Durgadas grew suspicious and escaped. After a brief period of conflict, Durgadas appealed for and agreed to a second truce in 1705.

In 1706, the Marathas, under the command of Dhanaji Jadhav, invaded Gujarat reaching as far as Bharuch and defeating the imperial forces at Ratanpur and at Baba Piara ghat. Upon hearing that Aurangzeb had appointed Prince Bidar Bakht as the next viceroy until the arrival of Ibrahim Khan, the Marathas left Gujarat. Ibrahim Khan took over the office of the viceroy in February 1707 just a few days before the passing of Aurangzeb. Taking advantage of Aurangzeb's death, the Marathas launched a second invasion under Balaji Vishvanath and reached as far as Ahmedabad. Fearing heavy plunder, Ibrahim Khan negotiated and paid a heavy tribute of 210,000 rupees to withdraw. Aurangzeb's death led to another civil war (Battle of Jajau), which resulted in the victory of Prince Muhammad Muazzam who ascended to the Mughal throne as Bahadur Shah I.

Gujarat experienced a drought and a famine in 1685 and 1686, respectively, which led to a shortage of grain and significant inflation in food prices.

=== Under successive emperors ===
==== Under Bahadur Shah I (1707–1712) ====
Ghazi-ud-Din Khan Bahadur Firuz Jang became the first viceroy of Gujarat under Bahadur Shah I arriving at Ahmedabad in September 1708. Bahadur Shah, considered to have followed Shia tenets, sparked a religious controversy by ordering the public prayer (khutba) in Gujarat to add the title of successor (wali) to Ali, the fourth caliph and the first Shia Imam; the preacher (khatib) at Ahmedabad that insisted on following the orders was killed. Following Ghazi-ud-Din Khan's death in 1710, Amanat Khan, the governor of Surat now titled Shahamat Khan, was given charge of affairs until the arrival of the next viceroy. Shahamat Khan requested and received an allowance of one lakh rupees per month to amass and maintain military forces and artillery to mitigate the danger of Maratha raids of the province. Emperor Bahadur Shah died at Lahore in February 1712.

==== Under Jahandar Shah (1712–1713) ====
In 1712, Emperor Bahadur Shah I was succeeded by his son Jahandar Shah, who appointed Asad Khan as the viceroy of Gujarat. Asad Khan remained in Delhi and governed through his deputies Muhammad Beg Khan and Sarbuland Khan whereas Shahamat Khan was appointed as the viceroy of Malwa. On 11 February 1713, Emperor Jahandar Shah was deposed and slain by his nephew Farrukhsiyar, who ascended to the throne on 11 January 1713.

==== Under Farrukhsiyar (1713–1719) ====
Emperor Farrukhsiyar ascended to the throne with the help of the Saiyid brothers Abdullah Khan and Husain Ali Khan, who were subsequently appointed as the prime minister (vazir) and the head of the Deccan provinces, respectively. Shahamat Khan was appointed the viceroy of Gujarat and arrived at Ahmedabad in June 1713. Subsequently, Daud Khan Panni was appointed the viceroy of Gujarat in October 1713 overseeing the province at the time of the communal riots that broke out during the Holi festival in 1714. Daud Khan Panni was later succeeded by Maharaja Ajit Singh in 1715, who, in turn, was succeeded by Khan Dauran. Emperor Farrukhsiyar was imprisoned and killed by the Saiyid brothers in 1719.

==== Under Muhammad Shah (1719–1748) ====
Emperor Farrukhsiyar was succeeded by the short reigns of Rafi ud-Darajat and Shah Jahan II. Following their deaths, Prince Roshan Akhtar came to the throne under the title of Muhammad Shah in September 1719. In the same year, Pilaji Gaekwad emerged as the most active and aggressive Maratha leader after making the hill fort of Songadh his headquarters. Gaekwad and the Marathas conducted attacks against and exacted tribute from south Gujarat.

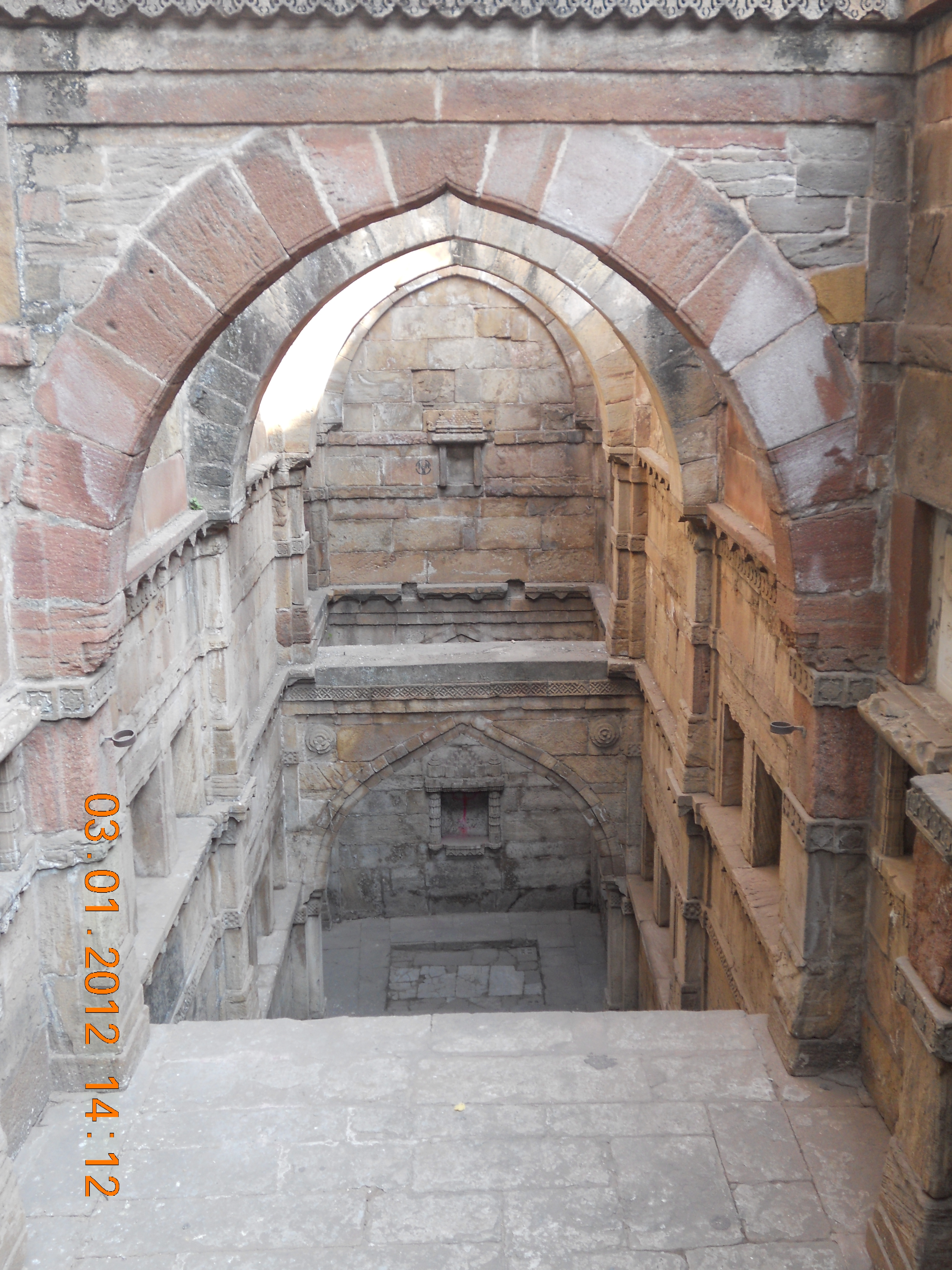
Amritvarshini Vav, Ahmedabad built by Raja Raghunathdas, diwan of Haidar Quli Khan

As a reward for his assistance in overthrowing the Saiyid brothers, Haidar Quli Khan was appointed as the viceroy of Gujarat in 1721. Since he was rebuffed for the position of prime minister (vazir), Haidar Quli Khan considered establishing himself as an independent ruler in Gujarat. As a result, he was recalled and Nizam-ul-mulk was appointed as the viceroy of Gujarat; Nizam-ul-mulk administered his role through Hamid Khan as his deputy. Nizam-ul-mulk, unable to conduct administrative reform or curtail corruption at the court, departed from Delhi and was succeeded by Sarbuland Khan Bahadur, who appointed Shujaat Khan as his deputy.

The transition of viceroyship from Hamid Khan to Shujaat Khan was contentious given the former's desire to hold on to power, which ultimately plunged Gujarat into a civil war between 1724 and 1725. Hamid Khan recruited the help of Maratha leaders and killed Shujaat Khan and his brothers, Ibrahim Quli Khan and Rustam Ali Khan. Further conflict at the Battle of Adas on the Mahi river in 1725 only saw the relative weakening of Mughal power as the Maratha forces of Kanthaji Kadam Bande (sided with Hamid Khan) and Pilaji Gaekwad (initially sided with Rustam Ali Khan and later with Hamid Khan) observed from the sidelines. Ultimately, Hamid Khan was driven out of power by Sarbuland Khan, the next viceroy of Gujarat, with the assistance of imperial troops who won skirmishes at Sojitra in Petland and at Kapadvanj in early 1726. Despite the backing of a significant imperial force, Sarbuland Khan entered into a treaty with Kanthaji in 1726 that granted the Marathas the right to collect taxes (chauth) in the districts north of the Mahi river, with the exception of Ahmedabad and the home district. While this period saw significant in-fighting between Kanthaji and Pilaji on one hand and the agents of Peshwa Baji Rao I on the other hand, the Mughal power diminished with the loss of Vadnagar, Dabhoi, and Baroda. Ultimately, Sarbuland Singh had no choice but to enter into a treaty with the Peshwa in which he agreed to turn over 10% of all land and customs revenues with the exception of Surat and its district, the regular tax (chauth) from all such districts, and 5% of all revenues from the city of Ahmedabad.

Given the oppressive rule and failure to contain the Maratha power, Sarbuland Khan was removed as the viceroy and was replaced by Maharaja Abhaysingh of Marwar in 1730. Despite considerable efforts, a failed alliance with Peshwa Baji Rao I, and a successful assassination of Pilaji Gaekwad, Abhaysingh was unable to suppress the Maratha invasions and influence. Abhaysingh left Ahmedabad for Delhi in 1733 after assigning Ratansingh as his deputy viceroy, who faced conflicts with Sohrab Khan (the son of Rustam Ali Khan) and with Rangoji. He engaged in tyrannical rule, imposed illegal taxes, and refused to transfer power to Momin Khan as the next viceroy. Emblematic of the political anarchy and the waning power of the Mughal Empire, Momin Khan forged an alliance with Rangoji and Damaji Gaekwad agreeing to highly punitive terms to drive out Ratansingh.

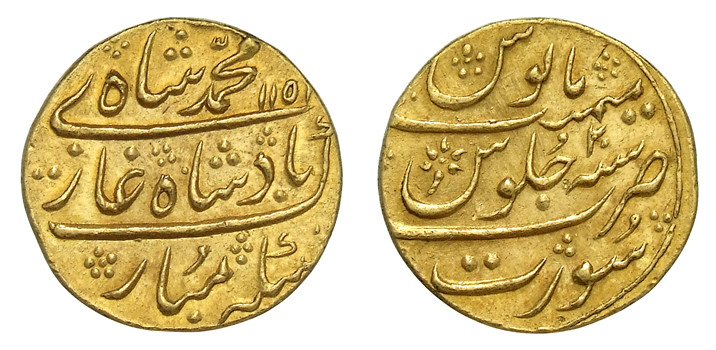
Gold coin minted during Muhammad Shah's reign in Surat

Following the death of Momin Khan, Mughal authority was administered jointly by his cousin, Fida-ud-din Khan, and his son, Muftakhir Khan. After Rangoji's failed attempt to capture Ahmedabad, Jawan Mard Khan Babi emerged a powerful figure in Gujarat. He established himself as the deputy viceroy under Abdul Aziz Khan on the basis of forged documents and successfully challenged Fakhr-ud-daulah, the imperial-appointed viceroy. Despite the in-fighting between Khanderao Gaekwad and Rangoji, this period undoubtedly marked the beginning of the collapse of the Mughal rule in Gujarat. Emperor Muhammad Shah died in 1748 and was succeeded by his son Ahmad Shah Bahadur.

==== Under Ahmad Shah Bahadur (1748–1754) ====
Emperor Ahmad Shah Bahadur appointed Vakhatsingh, brother of Maharaja Abhaysingh, as the next viceroy of Gujarat in May 1748 but he never officially took the position given the precarious political situation of the province. This dysfunction translated to increased robberies, kidnappings, and highway looting. The treaty between Damaji Gaekwad and Peshwa Baji Rao I in 1752 consolidated the Maratha power under the Peshwa, which, in turn, bolstered the Maratha power over Gujarat and resulted in the siege and capture of Ahmedabad in March 1753. Emperor Ahmad Shah Bahadur was deposed on account of political unrest in Delhi in 1754 and was succeeded by Aziz-ud-daulat under the name of Emperor Alamgir II.

==== Under Alamgir II (1754–1756) ====
Momin Khan II, who had established himself as the Nawab of Khambhat, represented the vestigial remnants of the Mughal Empire in Gujarat. On the heels of successful pillaging excursions to Gogha and Jambusar, Momin Khan II recaptured Ahmedabad from the Marathas in October 1756. In retaliation, the Marathas attacked Ahmedabad under the combined armies of Sadashiv Ramchandra, Damaji Gaekwad, and Jawan Mard Khan until Momin Khan II surrendered in February 1758.

== Economy and trade ==
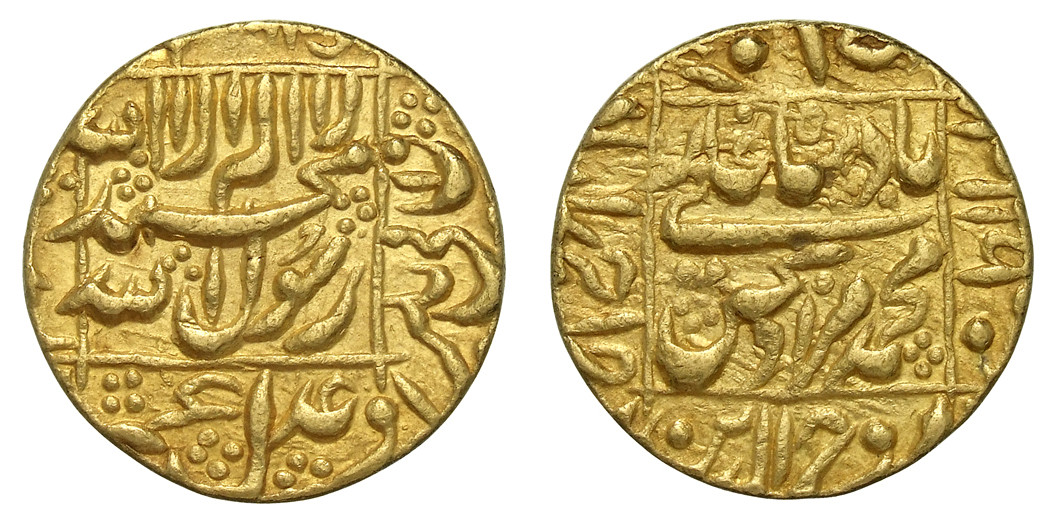
Gold coin minted by imperial claimant Murad Baksh, Ahmadabad mint

=== Oceanic trade ===
In the early 16th century, Gujarati merchants took advantage of the withdrawal of Chinese merchants from the Southeast Asian trade and established a presence in Malacca, Malaysia. They would provide Indian textiles and procure spices, Chinese porcelain and silk, and tin from Malaysia.

Oceanic merchants of several nations used the port of Khambhat in Gujarat as a stopover since all parts of the Indian Ocean could be reached within one monsoon season. Gujarati merchants developed a triangular trade network supplying Indian textiles to Aceh, Indonesia, pepper to the Red Sea (Aden, Yemen), and bullion back to Gujarat. However, in the 17th century, the Mughal port of Surat replaced the port of Khambhat in importance, which further facilitated the consolidation of the Gujarati oceanic trade. Wealthy, high-status entrepreneurs emerged in Surat, such as Vrij Vora, who, in the 1630s, was the leading merchant in a cartel that monopolized Dutch supplies of cloves and other spices.

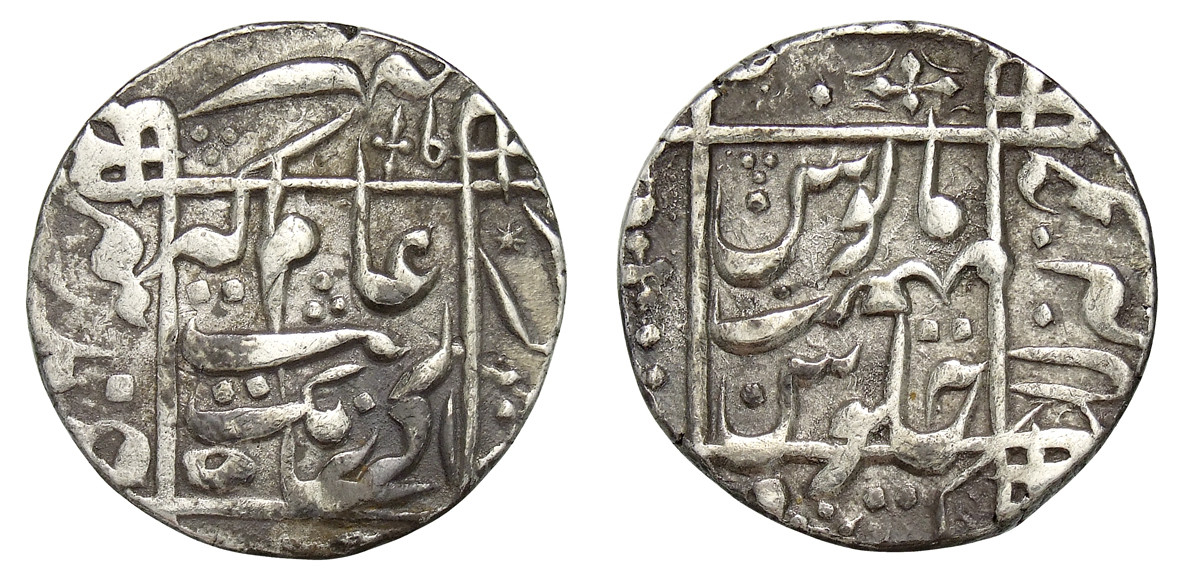
Coin minted under Aurangzeb, Junagarh mint

Gujarati oceanic trade expanded into the China Sea in the back-half of the 16th century owing to the liberal attitude of the Manchu-led Qing dynasty. In the 1690s, a small number of Gujarati ships also appeared at Manila, Philippines. The 18th century saw the fall of Gujarati oceanic trade and the shrinking importance of the port of Surat on account of the decline of the Mughal empire, Maratha incursions, the growing importance of the port of Mumbai, and increasing competition from English traders.

=== Silk and cotton handicrafts ===
Following the procurement of bales of silk from Bengal, the weaving of silk was localized in Ahmedabad and Surat. Velvet embroidered with gold or silver was manufactured at the royal factories in Ahmedabad and was used to construct pavilions that were sent to the royal court at Agra. Silk was also used to produce carpets, satins, and taffetas.

Cotton textiles—specifically, calicoes—were produced at Bharuch, Navsari, and Vadodara and became one of the two principal commodities that were exported by the British East India Company until the end of the reign of Shah Jahan.

=== Indigo ===
In Gujarat, indigo was primarily produced in Sarkhej in the 17th century. While this variety was not as pure (due to the mixture of sand) as the variety from Biana near Agra, it was similarly priced due to the savings from transporting it to the coast. The indigo trade decreased after 1650 as Europe turned to the West Indies as its source of supply.

=== Saltpeter ===
Saltpeter, an important ingredient in gunpowder, was largely supplied from Malpur, a small town in the Sabarkantha district, and was purchased by the British in Gujarat. The saltpeter trade with the British and the Dutch was relatively modest, consisting of between 200 and 300 tons per year, initially but was later expanded with the discovery of resources in Bihar.

As the viceroy of Gujarat, Aurangzeb embargoed the sale of saltpeter in 1645 on the religious reason that it may be used against other Muslims.

== Art and architecture ==
Art and architecture were emphasized under the reigns of Akbar, Jahangir, and Shah Jahan. Akbar favored the illustration of historical events and religious epics, Jahangir had an inclination towards wildlife paintings, and Shah Jahan was more interested in architecture.

=== Architecture ===
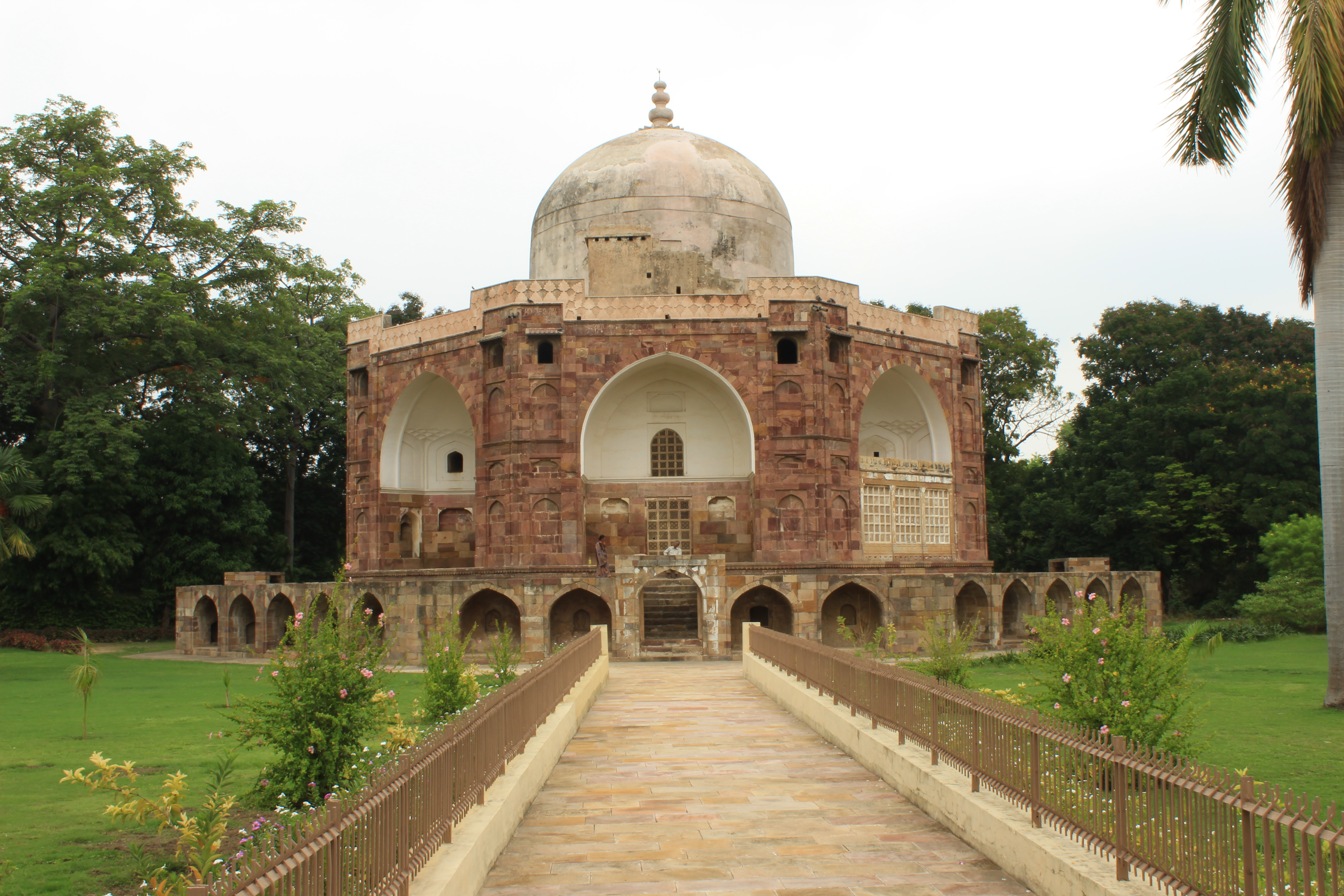
Hazira Maqbara or Qutbuddin Mahmad Khan's Tomb

Mughals introduced the charbagh (four gardens) concept, in which a square or rectangular garden is divided into four parts, with the intersection serving as a focal point for a monument. The red sandstone mausoleum of Qutb-ud-din Muhammad in Vadodara—which blends local traditions of perforated screens (jalis) and lattice windows—serves as one such example.

Construction of the Chintamani temple began in 1621 under the leadership of Shantidas Jhaveri; it serves as an archetype of Jain architecture in Gujarat from the Mughal period.

=== Gardens ===
Gardens in Gujarat under the Mughal Empire consisted of the imperial gardens, those built by nobles or Indian merchants, and gardens built by the Dutch and English. Usually situated on riverbanks to facilitate irrigation and fountains, these gardens often required significant expenditure for upkeep. They supported social activities and hosted feasts, music, and other entertainments.

Imperial gardens included the Fateh Bagh—laid out by Abdur Rahim Khan-i-Khanan and accessible to the public—which featured trees bearing oranges, lemons, apples, and pomegranates. Other notable sites included the Shahi Bagh, constructed by Shah Jahan on the banks of the Sabarmati River and featuring a rose garden, and the Rustam Bagh,laid out by Prince Murad.

Gardens laid out by the Dutch and English near Surat were also influenced by Mughal gardens, featuring four walkways intersecting at a central pavilion (chhatri).

== Administration ==
The Gujarat subah covered an area of 302 kos (966.4 kilometres) between Burhanpur in the east and Jagat (Dwarka) in the west and 70 kos (224 kilometres) between Jalore in the north and Daman in the south. The twenty-five sarkars (administrative units) of Gujarat Sultanate were reorganised in 16 sarkars and the others areas were transferred back to its older provinces. Of this 16 sarkars; nine were under direct control of the Mughal Empire; Ahmadabad, Baroda, Bharuch, Champaner, Godhra, Nadaut, Patan, Sorath, and Surat. They were known as sarkarat-i kharaji where the Mughal fiscal system of revenue collection was applied. The other seven sarkars were under administration and fiscal jurisdictions of the local chiefs; Bansballa (Banswara), Dungarpur, Kutch, Nawanagar, Ramnagar, Sirohi and Sant. They were known as sarkarat-i peshkashi where annual tribute (peshkash) was collected by the Mughals. This local chiefs, zamindars, acknowledged the Mughal suzerainty and occasionally provided military support.

Throughout the Mughal Empire, the single trimetallic currency was established but Gujarat continued to use a local silver coin known as Mahmudi alongside the Mughal currency.

== List of Mughal Viceroys of Gujarat (1573–1754) ==
=== Under Akbar (1573–1605) ===
The following are the Mughal viceroys of Gujarat under Akbar:

- Mirza Aziz Koka, Khan-i-Azam, 1573–1575
- Mirza Abdurrahim Khan (through Vazir Khan), 1575–1578
- Shihab-ud-din Ahmad Khan, 1578–1583
- Itimad Khan Gujarati, 1583
- Mírza Abdurrahim Khan (second time), 1584–1589
- Mírza Aziz Koka (second time), 1590–1593
- Prince Murad Baksh, 1593–1594
- Mirza Aziz Koka (third time, through his sons), 1600–1605

=== Under Jahangir (1605–1627) ===
The following are the Mughal viceroys of Gujarat under Jahangir:

- Qulij Khan and Raja Vikramjit, 1605–1606
- Shaikh Farid-i-Bukhari (Murtaza Khan), 1606–1609
- Mírza Aziz Koka (fourth time, through Jahangir Quli Khan as deputy), 1609–1611
- Abdulla Khan Fíruz Jang, 1611–1616
- Muqarrab Khan, 1616–1618
- Prince Shah Jahan (through Rustam Khan and Sundardas, Raja Vikramjit), 1618–1623
- Prince Dawar Baksh, 1623–1624
- Khan Jahan Lodi (through Saif Khan), 1624–1627

=== Under Shah Jahan (1627–1658) ===
The following are the Mughal viceroys of Gujarat under Shah Jahan:

- Sher Khan Tur, 1628–1631
- Islam Khan, Baqir Khan, and Sipahdar Khan, 1631–1635
- Saif Khan, 1635–1636
- Azam Khan, 1636–1642
- Mirza Isa Tarkhan, 1642–1645
- Prince Aurangzeb, 1645–1646
- Shaistah Khan, 1646–1648
- Prince Dara Shukoh, 1648–1652
- Shaistah Khan (second time), 1652–1654
- Prince Murad Bakhsh, 1654–1658

=== Under Aurangzeb (1658–1707) ===
The following are the Mughal viceroys of Gujarat under Aurangzeb:

- Shah Nawaz Khan Safavi, 1658–1659
- Maharaja Jaswant Singh, 1659–1662
- Mahabat Khan, 1662–1668
- Bahadur Khan, 1668–1670
- Maharaj Jaswant Singh (second time), 1670–1672
- Muhammad Amin Khan, 1672–1682
- Mukhtar Khan, 1682–1684
- Shujaat Khan (Kartalab Khan), 1685–1701
- Prince Muhammad Azam Shah, 1701–1705
- Prince Muhammad Bidar Bakht, 1706–1707
- Ibrahim Khan,1707–1708

=== Under successive emperors (1708–1730) ===
The following are the Mughal viceroys of Gujarat under successive emperors after Aurangzeb:

- Ghazi-ud-din Khan Bahadur Firuz Jang, 1708–1710
- Asaf ud-Daulah Asad Khan (through deputies), 1712
- Shahamat Khan (Amanat Khan), 1713
- Daud Khan Panni, 1713–1715
- Maharaja Ajit Singh of Jodhpur, 1715–1717
- Khan Dauran (through Haidar Quli Khan as deputy), 1717–1719
- Maharaja Ajit Singh (second time, through Anupsingh as deputy), 1719–1721
- Haidar Quli Khan (Muiz-ud-daulah), 1721–1722
- Nizam-ul-Mulk (through Hamid Khan as deputy), 1723–1724
- Sarbuland Khan (through Maasum Quli Khan as deputy), 1725–1730
- Maharaja Abhaysingh (later, through Ratansingh as deputy), 1730–1737
- Momin Khan I, 1737–1743
- Fida-ud-din and Muftakhir Khan, 1743
- Jawad Mard Khan Babi (de facto), 1743–1753
